= Grade II* listed buildings in Mid Suffolk =

There are over 20,000 Grade II* listed buildings in England. This page is a list of these buildings in the district of Mid Suffolk in Suffolk.

== Mid Suffolk ==
Name	Location	Type	Completed (Note: The date given is the date used by Historic England as significant for the initial building or that of an important part in the structure's description.)	Date designated	Grid ref. (Note: The grid reference is based on the British national grid reference system, sometimes known as OSGB36, used by the Ordnance Survey.) Geo-coordinates	Entry number (Note: The "List Entry Number" is a unique number assigned to each listed building and scheduled monument by Historic England.)	Image
Church of St Mary	Akenham, Mid Suffolk	Church	Norman	9 December 1955	TM1479048834; 52°05′46″N 1°08′04″E	1352028	Church of St Mary More images
Ashbocking Hall	Ashbocking	House	c. 1630	9 December 1955	TM1701154570; 52°08′48″N 1°10′13″E	1033081	Upload Photo
Aspall Hall	Aspall	Hall	Late 16th century	29 July 1955	TM1720365353; 52°14′37″N 1°10′48″E	1032403	Aspall Hall More images
Church of St Mary of Grace	Aspall	Parish Church	Medieval	29 July 1955	TM1672364930; 52°14′24″N 1°10′22″E	1213437	Church of St Mary of Grace More images
Church of St Peter	Athelington	Parish Church	Medieval	29 July 1955	TM2103070982; 52°17′33″N 1°14′23″E	1032562	Church of St Peter More images
Fords Green	Bacton	House	18th century	29 July 1955	TM0615666144; 52°15′17″N 1°01′08″E	1032724	Upload Photo
Manor House Christian Rest Home	Bacton	Farmhouse	19th century	29 July 1955	TM0499067153; 52°15′52″N 1°00′09″E	1032752	Manor House Christian Rest Home More images
Badley Hall	Badley	Farmhouse	16th century or Early 17th century	9 December 1955	TM0602855840; 52°09′45″N 1°00′39″E	1231083	Badley Hall More images
Barn 100 Metres South East of Badley Hall	Badley	Barn	17th century	9 December 1955	TM0608655809; 52°09′43″N 1°00′42″E	1231085	Upload Photo
Dovecote 60 Metres East of Badley Hall	Badley	Dovecote	16th century	9 December 1955	TM0609655840; 52°09′44″N 1°00′43″E	1231084	Upload Photo
Badwell Ash Hall	Badwell Ash	Farmhouse	Early 16th century	15 November 1954	TM0054269074; 52°17′00″N 0°56′19″E	1032204	Upload Photo
The Wurlie	Badwell Ash	House	16th century	15 November 1954	TL9907969175; 52°17′05″N 0°55′02″E	1181813	Upload Photo
Shrubland Hall, including attached Screen Walling on East Side, and Terraces and Balustrading on South and West Sides	Shrubland Park, Barham	Country House	1770-1772	9 December 1955	TM1263152505; 52°07′48″N 1°06′19″E	1033252	Shrubland Hall, including attached Screen Walling on East Side, and Terraces and Balustrading on South and West Sides More images
Grand Stairs and Grotto, 50 Metres West of Shrubland Hall	Shrubland Park, Barham	Grotto	c. 1850	9 December 1955	TM1256152523; 52°07′48″N 1°06′15″E	1279509	Grand Stairs and Grotto, 50 Metres West of Shrubland Hall
Terrace known as the Balcony Garden, Including Balustrading and Pavilion, Shrubland Hall	Shrubland Park, Barham	Balustrade	1849-1850	9 December 1955	TM1258652560; 52°07′50″N 1°06′16″E	1352051	Upload Photo
Upper Gun Terrace, 10 Metres West of Shrubland Hall	Shrubland Park, Barham	Wall	1849-1850	9 December 1955	TM1259752514; 52°07′48″N 1°06′17″E	1207906	Upload Photo
Baylham Hall	Baylham	Hall	Early 17th century	9 December 1955	TM0917351664; 52°07′25″N 1°03′15″E	1293336	Upload Photo
Stable Range, 30 Metres South East of Baylham Hall	Baylham	Granary	C20	9 December 1955	TM0922951646; 52°07′25″N 1°03′18″E	1208099	Upload Photo
Baylham Watermill and Mill House	Baylham	Mill House	Mid 19th century	9 December 1955	TM1124252709; 52°07′56″N 1°05′06″E	1033260	Baylham Watermill and Mill House More images
Church of St Peter	Baylham	Tower	Late 14th century	9 December 1955	TM1022851547; 52°07′20″N 1°04′10″E	1033258	Church of St Peter More images
Bedfield Hall	Bedfield	House	19th century	29 July 1955	TM2275966442; 52°15′04″N 1°15′43″E	1198745	Bedfield Hall More images
Bedingfield Hall	Bedingfield	Aisled House	Early 14th century	29 July 1955	TM1990267756; 52°15′50″N 1°13′16″E	1213518	Bedingfield Hall More images
Fleming's Hall	Bedingfield	House	C20	29 July 1955	TM1924967788; 52°15′52″N 1°12′42″E	1032413	Fleming's Hall More images
Church of All Saints	Beyton	Parish Church	Medieval	15 November 1954	TL9339562776; 52°13′45″N 0°49′49″E	1032500	Church of All Saints More images
Chapel of St Botolph	Crown Hill, Botesdale	Grammar School/Chapel of Ease	1576	29 July 1955	TM0487775890; 52°20′34″N 1°00′22″E	1352340	Chapel of St Botolph More images
St Catherines	Botesdale	House	Early-Mid 17th century	16 March 1988	TM0471275754; 52°20′30″N 1°00′13″E	1277591	Upload Photo
Street Farmhouse with Attached Outbuilding	Botesdale	Farmhouse	Early 15th century	16 March 1988	TM0491475943; 52°20′36″N 1°00′24″E	1352339	Upload Photo
The Priory with attached Outbuildings and Garden Walls	Botesdale	House	Early 17th century	29 July 1955	TM0489175918; 52°20′35″N 1°00′23″E	1032608	Upload Photo
Former Church of St Mary	Braiseworth	Parish Church (ruin)	12th century	29 July 1955	TM1379271322; 52°17′54″N 1°08′02″E	1032276	Former Church of St Mary More images
Bramford House	Bramford	House	c. 1693	9 December 1955	TM1266846413; 52°04′31″N 1°06′07″E	1250919	Upload Photo
Church of St Mary	Brome, Brome and Oakley	Parish Church	Medieval	29 July 1955	TM1450976464; 52°20′39″N 1°08′52″E	1352379	Church of St Mary More images
Church of St Nicholas	Oakley, Brome and Oakley	Parish Church	Medieval	29 July 1955	TM1571977366; 52°21′07″N 1°09′58″E	1181612	Church of St Nicholas More images
Park Farmhouse	Brome and Oakley	Farmhouse	Mid 16th century	14 April 1988	TM1418476556; 52°20′43″N 1°08′35″E	1032524	Upload Photo
Poplar Farmhouse	Lower Oakley, Brome and Oakley	Farmhouse	Late 16th century	29 July 1955	TM1613277949; 52°21′25″N 1°10′21″E	1284932	Upload Photo
Brundish Manor	Brundish	Farmhouse	Early-mid 16th century	29 July 1955	TM2639271222; 52°17′33″N 1°19′06″E	1032864	Upload Photo
Church of St Mary	Burgate	Parish Church	Mid to Late 14th century	29 July 1955	TM0824275599; 52°20′20″N 1°03′19″E	1032797	Church of St Mary More images
Hall Farm House	Burgate	Farmhouse	c. 1400	29 July 1955	TM0800675525; 52°20′18″N 1°03′07″E	1352234	Upload Photo
Maypole Farmhouse	Buxhall	Farmhouse	c. 1530	9 December 1955	TM0038757779; 52°10′55″N 0°55′47″E	1033033	Upload Photo
Mockbeggars Hall	Claydon	House	1621	9 December 1955	TM1311348664; 52°05′43″N 1°06′35″E	1263022	Mockbeggars Hall More images
Grand Stairs and Grotto 50 Metres West of Shrubland Hall	Shrubland Park, Coddenham	Grotto	c. 1850	26 March 1987	TM1251852534; 52°07′49″N 1°06′13″E	1033241	Upload Photo
Lower Loggia and attached Balustrading and Steps 150 Metres West of Shrubland Hall	Shrubland Park, Coddenham	Balustrade	c. 1850	26 March 1987	TM1245952548; 52°07′49″N 1°06′10″E	1284720	Upload Photo
The Old Lodge and the Post Office	Coddenham	Jettied House	Early-Mid 16th century	9 December 1955	TM1342354260; 52°08′43″N 1°07′04″E	1181646	The Old Lodge and the Post Office More images
Ponderosa & Post Office Cottage	Combs	Farmhouse	Late 14th century or c1400	9 December 1955	TM0432656412; 52°10′05″N 0°59′11″E	1284144	Upload Photo
Church of St Mary	Creeting St. Mary	Parish Church	Medieval	9 December 1955	TM0938256703; 52°10′08″N 1°03′37″E	1033245	Church of St Mary More images
Barn 30 Metres North West of Roydon Hall	Creeting St Peter	Barn	C18-C19	9 December 1955	TM0846458506; 52°11′07″N 1°02′53″E	1284584	Upload Photo
Creeting Hall	Creeting St Peter	Cross Wing House	Mid 16th century	9 December 1955	TM0788856850; 52°10′15″N 1°02′19″E	1352073	Creeting Hall More images
Roydon Hall	Creeting St. Peter	Farmhouse	Mid or Late 16th century	9 December 1955	TM0849358483; 52°11′07″N 1°02′54″E	1033215	Upload Photo
Church of All Saints	Crowfield	Parish Church	Early 15th century	9 December 1955	TM1423257780; 52°10′36″N 1°07′55″E	1181164	Church of All Saints More images
Ancient House	3, Gracechurch St, Debenham	Cross Passage House	c. 1540	9 December 1955	TM1736563241; 52°13′28″N 1°10′52″E	1032319	Ancient House More images
Crows Hall (including Bridge over Moat and Walling Lining Inner Side of Moat to West and South)	Debenham	House	19th century	9 December 1955	TM1923462827; 52°13′12″N 1°12′29″E	1352472	Crows Hall (including Bridge over Moat and Walling Lining Inner Side of Moat to West and South) More images
Lanchester Antiques & Old House & the Gables	21-25, High St, Debenham	Shop and House	Mid 16th century	9 December 1955	TM1739863276; 52°13′29″N 1°10′54″E	1352462	Lanchester Antiques & Old House & the Gables More images
Swiss Farm Butchers & the Debenham Gallery	1-3, High St, Debenham	House	Early-Mid 16th century	9 December 1955	TM1737163361; 52°13′32″N 1°10′53″E	1032322	Swiss Farm Butchers & the Debenham Gallery More images
Sycamores	27, High St, Debenham	House	19th century	9 December 1955	TM1740063256; 52°13′28″N 1°10′54″E	1199486	Upload Photo
The Guildhall	2 Gracechurch st, Debenham	Fire Station	Post 1621	9 December 1955	TM1737463265; 52°13′29″N 1°10′52″E	1199276	The Guildhall More images
31–37 High Street	Debenham	House	Post 16th century (later)	9 December 1955	TM1740963228; 52°13′28″N 1°10′54″E	1199502	31–37 High Street More images
Church of St John the Baptist	Denham	Parish Church	Medieval	29 July 1955	TM1883474784; 52°19′39″N 1°12′36″E	1032530	Church of St John the Baptist More images
Church of All Saints	Drinkstone	Parish Church	1330-50	15 November 1954	TL9597261605; 52°13′04″N 0°52′03″E	1352345	Church of All Saints More images
The Old Rectory	Drinkstone	Vicarage	c. 1760	15 November 1954	TL9598461853; 52°13′12″N 0°52′04″E	1032622	The Old Rectory More images
Drinkstone Smock Mill	Drinkstone	Mill	18th century	15 November 1954	TL9641362102; 52°13′20″N 0°52′27″E	1285454	Drinkstone Smock Mill More images
Yewtree House	Forward Green, Earl Stonham	House	16th century	9 December 1955	TM0981559922; 52°11′51″N 1°04′07″E	1033226	Upload Photo
Church of St John	Elmswell	Parish Church	Medieval	15 November 1954	TL9820263599; 52°14′06″N 0°54′04″E	1032468	Church of St John More images
Barn at Moor Hall Farm (Moor Hall Farm not included)	Eye	Barn	18th century	12 February 1998	TM1430873161; 52°18′53″N 1°08′34″E	1334397	Upload Photo
Cookley Farmhouse	Eye	Farmhouse	c. 1550	15 June 1951	TM1660274155; 52°19′22″N 1°10′37″E	1316625	Upload Photo
Cranley Hall	Eye	Farmhouse	Mid 15th century	15 June 1951	TM1524072835; 52°18′41″N 1°09′22″E	1316627	Upload Photo
Rook Hall Barn	Eye	Barn	Mid 16th century	24 July 1978 (as scheduled monument, II* on 20 August 2024)	TM1318572737; 52°18′41″N 1°07′34″E	1490391	Upload Photo
Stayer House	Eye	Kitchen	World War II	15 June 1951	TM1481373716; 52°19′10″N 1°09′02″E	1316595	Stayer House More images
The Cottage & White House	Eye	House	Early 18th century	15 June 1951	TM1483173851; 52°19′14″N 1°09′03″E	1316616	The Cottage & White House More images
Town Hall	Eye	Town Hall	1857	20 October 1971	TM1451273886; 52°19′16″N 1°08′46″E	1316536	Town Hall More images
5 Broad Street	Eye	House	c. 1480	15 June 1951	TM1454573868; 52°19′15″N 1°08′48″E	1316524	5 Broad Street More images
Church of St Peter	Felsham	Parish Church	Medieval	15 November 1954	TL9468157005; 52°10′37″N 0°50′45″E	1032627	Church of St Peter More images
Church Farmhouse	Gislingham Rd, Finningham	House	Late 15th century	14 June 1987	TM0683869380; 52°17′01″N 1°01′51″E	1033145	Upload Photo
Yew Tree House and Amberley	Church Lane, Finningham	House	Mid 16th century	29 July 1955	TM0664869475; 52°17′04″N 1°01′42″E	1033143	Upload Photo
Barn 70 Metres South of Framsden Hall	Framsden	Outbuilding	19th century	9 December 1955	TM2059360002; 52°11′39″N 1°13′34″E	1181297	Upload Photo
Boundary Farmhouse	Framsden	Farmhouse	Mid 16th century	9 December 1955	TM1867860782; 52°12′07″N 1°11′55″E	1033058	Boundary Farmhouse More images
Post Mill	Framsden	Flour Mill	c. 1740	9 December 1955	TM1918159753; 52°11′33″N 1°12′19″E	1352134	Post Mill More images
Stable, 50 Metres South of Boundary Farmhouse	Framsden	Stable	Early or Mid 17th century	9 December 1955	TM1866260735; 52°12′05″N 1°11′54″E	1033059	Upload Photo
Barn Approximately 50 Metres West South West of Church Farm Stable	Fressingfield	Aisled Barn	Late C13-Early 14th century	3 June 1997	TM2601777580; 52°20′59″N 1°19′02″E	1245363	Upload Photo
Fressingfield Hall	Fressingfield	Farmhouse	Early 17th century	29 July 1955	TM2665777657; 52°21′00″N 1°19′36″E	1352192	Upload Photo
The Fox and Goose	Fressingfield	Inn	19th century	29 July 1955	TM2611477453; 52°20′55″N 1°19′07″E	1032967	The Fox and Goose More images
Tithe Farmhouse	Fressingfield	Farmhouse	Mid 14th century	21 October 1987	TM2680777038; 52°20′40″N 1°19′42″E	1032927	Upload Photo
Ufford Hall	Fressingfield	Farmhouse	Late 16th century	29 July 1955	TM2727574605; 52°19′21″N 1°20′01″E	1032930	Ufford Hall More images
Gedding Hall with Bridge attached to South Side of Gatehouse	Gedding	House	Early 16th century	15 November 1954	TL9538758565; 52°11′27″N 0°51′25″E	1032593	Gedding Hall with Bridge attached to South Side of Gatehouse More images
Gipping Lone	Gipping	House	c. 1600	9 December 1955	TM0721864152; 52°14′12″N 1°02′00″E	1180773	Upload Photo
Ivy House Farmhouse	Gislingham	House	Late 15th century	29 July 1955	TM0768471880; 52°18′21″N 1°02′42″E	1180705	Ivy House Farmhouse More images
Manor House	Gislingham	House	Late 15th century	29 July 1955	TM0649572064; 52°18′28″N 1°01′39″E	1033163	Upload Photo
The Old Guildhall	Gislingham	House	Late 15th century	29 July 1955	TM0738571812; 52°18′19″N 1°02′26″E	1180771	Upload Photo
Church of St Mary	Gosbeck	Parish Church	Possibly 10th century or 11th century	9 December 1955	TM1506255622; 52°09′25″N 1°08′33″E	1181491	Church of St Mary More images
Butterfly Farmhouse	Great Finborough	Farmhouse	c. 1570	22 January 1988	TM0036456361; 52°10′09″N 0°55′43″E	1197984	Upload Photo
New Bells Farmhouse	Haughley Green, Haughley	Farmhouse	c. 1530	9 December 1955	TM0352964072; 52°14′14″N 0°58′46″E	1032705	Upload Photo
Elm Farmhouse	Helmingham	Farmhouse	Early 17th century	22 September 1987	TM1967856948; 52°10′01″N 1°12′39″E	1033040	Elm Farmhouse More images
Old Hall Farmhouse	Hemingstone	Farmhouse	Early 17th century	22 September 1987	TM1523953089; 52°08′03″N 1°08′37″E	1182665	Old Hall Farmhouse More images
Stonewall Farmhouse	Hemingstone	Farmhouse	c. 1600	9 December 1955	TM1516754249; 52°08′41″N 1°08′36″E	1352152	Stonewall Farmhouse More images
Walnut Tree Farmhouse	Henley	Farmhouse	Mid 15th century to Mid 16th century	24 January 1986	TM1558251808; 52°07′21″N 1°08′52″E	1251354	Upload Photo
Church of St Mary	Horham	Parish Church	Medieval	29 July 1955	TM2103372446; 52°18′20″N 1°14′27″E	1032540	Church of St Mary More images
Abbey Farmhouse	Hoxne	Farmhouse	Early 17th century	29 July 1955	TM1831576400; 52°20′32″N 1°12′13″E	1032502	Abbey Farmhouse More images
Chickering Corner Farmhouse	Hoxne	Farmhouse	C16-C17	29 July 1955	TM2055176409; 52°20′29″N 1°14′11″E	1181159	Upload Photo
Haywards Farm Cottage	Chickering, Hoxne	Farmhouse	16th century	29 July 1955	TM2056076418; 52°20′29″N 1°14′11″E	1032543	Upload Photo
Red House Farmhouse	South Green, Hoxne	Farmhouse	Early 16th century	29 July 1955	TM1733675003; 52°19′48″N 1°11′18″E	1374915	Upload Photo
The Swan (including attached Outbuildings)	Hoxne	Jettied House	Early 16th century	29 July 1955	TM1797677190; 52°20′58″N 1°11′57″E	1352375	The Swan (including attached Outbuildings) More images
Thorpe Hall	Hoxne	House	Late 16th century	29 July 1955	TM2118073783; 52°19′03″N 1°14′38″E	1352386	Upload Photo
Church of St Michael	Hunston	Parish Church	Medieval	9 May 1988	TL9758568048; 52°16′30″N 0°53′41″E	1182395	Church of St Michael More images
Church of All Saints	Kenton	Parish Church	Medieval	29 July 1955	TM1913965913; 52°14′52″N 1°12′31″E	1283114	Church of All Saints More images
Church of St Mary	Langham	Parish Church	14th century	15 November 1954	TL9805669024; 52°17′01″N 0°54′08″E	1352527	Church of St Mary More images
Langham Hall	Langham	Manor House	Early 18th century	15 November 1954	TL9786269030; 52°17′02″N 0°53′58″E	1181875	Langham Hall More images
Aldridge's Farmhouse	Laxfield	Farmhouse	First half of 14th century	18 December 1987	TM2737173463; 52°18′44″N 1°20′03″E	1180914	Aldridge's Farmhouse More images
Old Guildhall	Laxfield	Guildhall/Museum	c. 1520	29 July 1955	TM2962272380; 52°18′05″N 1°21′59″E	1180990	Old Guildhall More images
Waterloo House	Laxfield	House	Early-mid 16th century	29 July 1955	TM2973172473; 52°18′08″N 1°22′05″E	1180816	Upload Photo
White House Farmhouse	Laxfield	Farmhouse	Early 15th century	18 December 1987	TM2740973150; 52°18′34″N 1°20′04″E	1285326	Upload Photo
Church of St Mary	Little Finborough	Parish Church	Medieval	9 December 1955	TM0185854963; 52°09′22″N 0°56′58″E	1032984	Church of St Mary More images
Church of St Mary the Virgin	Mellis	Parish Church	Early 14th century	29 July 1955	TM0948474321; 52°19′37″N 1°04′22″E	1181735	Church of St Mary the Virgin More images
Elm Tree Farmhouse	Mellis	House	Late 16th century	29 July 1955	TM1042574767; 52°19′50″N 1°05′13″E	1181795	Upload Photo
Mendham Lodge	Mendham	Farmhouse	16th century	29 July 1955	TM2721381875; 52°23′16″N 1°20′15″E	1284665	Upload Photo
Middleton Hall	Mendham	Farmhouse	Early 16th century	29 July 1955	TM2870383550; 52°24′08″N 1°21′38″E	1032939	Upload Photo
Elms Farmhouse	Mendlesham	Farmhouse	Late 15th century	29 July 1955	TM1031265353; 52°14′46″N 1°04′45″E	1352508	Upload Photo
Read Hall	Mickfield	Farmhouse	Early 15th century	26 July 1979	TM1266962673; 52°13′16″N 1°06′44″E	1183190	Upload Photo
The Ancient House	1 & 3, King William St, Needham Market	House	Early or Mid 16th century	9 December 1955	TM0879755250; 52°09′22″N 1°03′03″E	1254336	Upload Photo
The Bull Inn	Needham Market	Jettied House	Early 16th century	9 December 1955	TM0881355135; 52°09′18″N 1°03′04″E	1277416	The Bull Inn More images
The Limes Hotel	Needham Market	Steps	1986	9 December 1955	TM0877255121; 52°09′18″N 1°03′02″E	1253662	The Limes Hotel More images
Tudor House	11, High St, Needham Market	House	16th century	9 December 1955	TM0873855167; 52°09′19″N 1°03′00″E	1253664	Upload Photo
93 High Street	Needham Market	House	Early 18th century	9 December 1955	TM0878255092; 52°09′17″N 1°03′02″E	1253661	Upload Photo
High Hall	Nettlestead	House	1620-1630	9 December 1955	TM0860650248; 52°06′40″N 1°02′42″E	1250944	High Hall More images
Tudor Grange	Somersham, Nettlestead	Farmhouse	Mid 16th century	9 December 1955	TM0829148995; 52°06′00″N 1°02′23″E	1263029	Tudor Grange More images
Barn 200 Metres West of Halls Farmhouse	Norton	Barn	18th century	9 May 1988	TL9579666730; 52°15′50″N 0°52′04″E	1352406	Upload Photo
Church of St Andrew	Norton	Parish Church	Medieval	15 November 1954	TL9622366320; 52°15′36″N 0°52′26″E	1352404	Church of St Andrew More images
Little Haugh Hall	Norton	Manor House	c. 1730	15 November 1954	TL9521766647; 52°15′48″N 0°51′33″E	1352425	Little Haugh Hall More images
Manor Farmhouse	Norton Little Green, Norton	Farmhouse	Medieval	15 November 1954	TL9753866429; 52°15′38″N 0°53′35″E	1284431	Manor Farmhouse More images
Church of St Michael	Occold	Parish Church	Medieval	29 July 1955	TM1557870863; 52°17′37″N 1°09′35″E	1352447	Church of St Michael More images
Old Newton Hall	Old Newton with Dagworth	Farmhouse	19th century	9 December 1955	TM0673761841; 52°12′58″N 1°01′30″E	1181768	Old Newton Hall More images
Ward Green Farmhouse	Ward Green, Old Newton with Dagworth	Farmhouse	Early 15th century	9 December 1955	TM0507564009; 52°14′10″N 1°00′07″E	1032689	Upload Photo
Brackendale	Palgrave	House	C20	29 July 1955	TM1156478397; 52°21′46″N 1°06′21″E	1032778	Upload Photo
Church of St Catherine	Pettaugh	Parish Church	Medieval	9 December 1955	TM1678759617; 52°11′32″N 1°10′13″E	1182764	Church of St Catherine More images
Church Cottage	Rattlesden	Open Hall House	Pre 1800	15 November 1954	TL9784759027; 52°11′38″N 0°53′36″E	1352360	Church Cottage More images
Folly Lodge known as Dove House	Redgrave Park, Redgrave	Lodge	1765-70	29 July 1955	TM0629476724; 52°20′59″N 1°01′39″E	1261272	Upload Photo
The Pink House	Redgrave	House	17th century	29 July 1955	TM0421978161; 52°21′48″N 0°59′53″E	1261273	Upload Photo
Broomhills	Rickinghall Inferior	House	19th century	15 November 1954	TM0408776410; 52°20′52″N 0°59′42″E	1064775	Upload Photo
Hamblyn House	Rickinghall Inferior	Timber Framed House	Mid 17th century	29 July 1955	TM0463675714; 52°20′29″N 1°00′09″E	1359125	Upload Photo
Barn, 80 Metres South West of Ringshall Hall	Ringshall	House	1993	9 December 1955	TM0427952736; 52°08′07″N 0°59′00″E	1352190	Upload Photo
Buck's Hall	Rishangles	Farmhouse	Mid 14th century	23 June 1988	TM1670267347; 52°15′42″N 1°10′26″E	1352451	Upload Photo
The Old Church	Rishangles, Mid Suffolk	Parish Church/House	c. 1200	29 July 1955	TM1605268646; 52°16′25″N 1°09′55″E	1032380	The Old Church More images
Church of King Charles the Martyr	Shelland Green, Shelland	Parish Church	Medieval	9 December 1955	TM0035260228; 52°12′14″N 0°55′50″E	1352321	Church of King Charles the Martyr More images
Church of St Margaret	Southolt	Parish Church	15th century	29 July 1955	TM1934168870; 52°16′27″N 1°12′49″E	1288635	Church of St Margaret More images
Church of All Saints	Stoke Ash	Parish Church	Medieval	29 July 1955	TM1149970423; 52°17′28″N 1°05′59″E	1181895	Church of All Saints More images
East End Manor	Stonham Aspal	Farmhouse	Mid 15th century	9 December 1955	TM1530259871; 52°11′42″N 1°08′56″E	1033171	Upload Photo
Clock House	Stonham Parva	Farmhouse	Mid or Late 15th century	9 December 1955	TM1149161189; 52°12′30″N 1°05′38″E	1284270	Clock House More images
Abbot's Hall	Crowe St, Stowmarket	House	1709	28 July 1950	TM0485458523; 52°11′13″N 0°59′43″E	1195859	Abbot's Hall More images
3, Station Road	Stowmarket	House	Early 15th century	19 April 1972	TM0488958704; 52°11′19″N 0°59′45″E	1297869	3, Station Road More images
Lynton House	10, Station Rd, Stowmarket	House	Mid 18th century	28 July 1950	TM0498658732; 52°11′19″N 0°59′51″E	1209660	Lynton House More images
Museum of East Anglian Life Tithe Barn	Stowmarket	Grange	15th century	28 July 1950	TM0471958506; 52°11′12″N 0°59′36″E	1195880	Upload Photo
The Cedars Hotel	Needham Rd, Stowmarket	House	Early 17th century	28 July 1950	TM0584557485; 52°10′38″N 1°00′33″E	1209561	The Cedars Hotel More images
The Meadlands Public House	Needham Rd, Stowmarket	House	Late C20	19 April 1972	TM0571357725; 52°10′46″N 1°00′27″E	1195875	Upload Photo
The Rookery	15 & 15a, Tavern St, Stowmarket	House	1770	28 July 1950	TM0475058681; 52°11′18″N 0°59′38″E	1297873	The Rookery More images
The Stricklands	Stricklands Rd, Stowmarket	House	Late 18th century	28 July 1950	TM0493358396; 52°11′09″N 0°59′47″E	1209708	Upload Photo
Valley Farmhouse	Stowmarket	Farmhouse	Late 15th century	28 July 1950	TM0437757917; 52°10′54″N 0°59′17″E	1195896	Upload Photo
Columbine Hall	Stowupland, Mid Suffolk	Farmhouse	18th century and 19th century	15 March 1988	TM0675660848; 52°12′25″N 1°01′28″E	1352322	Columbine Hall More images
Broad End Farmhouse	Stradbroke, Mid Suffolk	Farmhouse	Second half of 14th century	29 July 1955	TM2626074357; 52°19′14″N 1°19′07″E	1032844	Upload Photo
Church of All Saints	Stradbroke	Parish Church	Medieval	29 July 1955	TM2319173980; 52°19′07″N 1°16′24″E	1032854	Church of All Saints More images
Hill House Farmhouse	Battlesea Green, Stradbroke	Farmhouse	16th century	29 July 1955	TM2258275410; 52°19′54″N 1°15′55″E	1181184	Upload Photo
Church of All Saints	Stuston	Parish Church	12th century or 13th century	29 July 1955	TM1346177857; 52°21′26″N 1°08′00″E	1032794	Church of All Saints More images
Church of St Mary	Syleham	Parish Church	C11/C12	29 July 1955	TM2049278952; 52°21′51″N 1°14′13″E	1032919	Church of St Mary More images
Gatehouse Farmhouse	Syleham	Farmhouse	Mid 16th century	29 July 1955	TM1922477386; 52°21′02″N 1°13′03″E	1182408	Upload Photo
Monks Hall	Syleham	Farmhouse	c. 1600	29 July 1955	TM2016178470; 52°21′36″N 1°13′55″E	1032921	Monks Hall More images
Tannington Hall	Tannington	House	19th century	29 July 1955	TM2479068729; 52°16′15″N 1°17′36″E	1215204	Upload Photo
Church of All Saints	Thorndon	Parish Church	Early 13th century	29 July 1955	TM1419669661; 52°17′00″N 1°08′20″E	1215792	Church of All Saints More images
Shorts Farmhouse	Thorndon	Farmhouse	Mid 16th century	23 June 1988	TM1425768018; 52°16′07″N 1°08′19″E	1032390	Shorts Farmhouse More images
Church of St Mary Magdalene	Thornham Magna	Parish Church	14th century	29 July 1955	TM1039171427; 52°18′02″N 1°05′03″E	1033129	Church of St Mary Magdalene More images
The Four Horseshoes Public House	Thornham Magna	House	Mid - Late 15th century	29 July 1955	TM1042270729; 52°17′40″N 1°05′03″E	1033134	The Four Horseshoes Public House More images
The Manor House	Thrandeston	House	C20	17 November 1987	TM1121076393; 52°20′42″N 1°05′58″E	1182711	Upload Photo
Manor Farm House	Thurston	Farmhouse	1876	11 January 1991	TL9272265642; 52°15′19″N 0°49′20″E	1032401	Upload Photo
Church of St George	Thwaite	Church (redundant)	Medieval	29 July 1955	TM1135868153; 52°16′15″N 1°05′47″E	1032261	Church of St George More images
Church of St Margaret	Wattisfield	Church	Early 14th century	15 November 1954	TM0103074191; 52°19′44″N 0°56′56″E	1182475	Church of St Margaret More images
Wattisfield Hall, Garden Walls and Gate Piers	Wattisfield	Farmhouse	Early 17th century	15 November 1954	TM0083473872; 52°19′34″N 0°56′45″E	1352541	Wattisfield Hall, Garden Walls and Gate Piers More images
Rookery Farmhouse	Westhorpe	House	16th century	29 July 1955	TM0440769170; 52°16′58″N 0°59′43″E	1352097	Upload Photo
Rookyard Farmhouse	Base Green, Wetherden	Farmhouse	Late 15th century or Early 16th century	15 March 1988	TM0151863380; 52°13′54″N 0°56′58″E	1032668	Upload Photo
Church of St Andrew	Weybread	Parish Church	Medieval	29 July 1955	TM2410280117; 52°22′24″N 1°17′27″E	1284449	Church of St Andrew More images
Street Farmhouse	Wickham Skeith	Farmhouse	16th century	29 July 1955	TM0887569728; 52°17′10″N 1°03′40″E	1352524	Street Farmhouse More images
Chesnut Lodge	Wilby Green, Wilby	Farmhouse	16th century	29 July 1955	TM2410770842; 52°17′24″N 1°17′05″E	1181729	Upload Photo
White House	Wingfield	House	Early 17th century	21 October 1987	TM2372276549; 52°20′29″N 1°16′58″E	1032893	Upload Photo
Wingfield College	Wingfield	College/House	Post 1362	29 July 1955	TM2301576762; 52°20′37″N 1°16′21″E	1284374	Wingfield College More images
Church of St Andrew	Winston	Parish Church	Probably Early 15th century	9 December 1955	TM1802561635; 52°12′35″N 1°11′23″E	1182799	Church of St Andrew More images
The Lanes	Woolpit	House	19th century	18 April 1988	TL9848961644; 52°13′02″N 0°54′15″E	1032557	Upload Photo
Worlingworth Hall	Worlingworth	Manor House	Late 13th century	23 June 1988	TM2359368960; 52°16′24″N 1°16′33″E	1032363	Upload Photo
The Manor House	Wortham	House	18th century	29 July 1955	TM0782379749; 52°22′35″N 1°03′06″E	1032738	Upload Photo
Grange Farm House	Wyverstone	House	15th century	29 July 1955	TM0311968070; 52°16′24″N 0°58′33″E	1284925	Upload Photo
Bull's Hall and attached Outbuildings	Yaxley	House	19th century	14 June 1987	TM1171473068; 52°18′54″N 1°06′17″E	1033119	Upload Photo
Guildhall Cottage	Yaxley	Guildhall	Early 16th century	29 July 1955	TM1210174096; 52°19′26″N 1°06′39″E	1033115	Upload Photo
Yaxley Hall	Yaxley	Country House	c. 1580	14 June 1987	TM1247273594; 52°19′09″N 1°06′58″E	1284876	Yaxley Hall More images
Yaxley Manor House	Yaxley	Farmhouse	c. 1520	29 July 1955	TM1082274475; 52°19′40″N 1°05′33″E	1352106	Yaxley Manor House More images
