= Hartismere Rural District =

Rural district in East Suffolk, England

Coordinates: 52.28°N 1.27°E

Hartismere
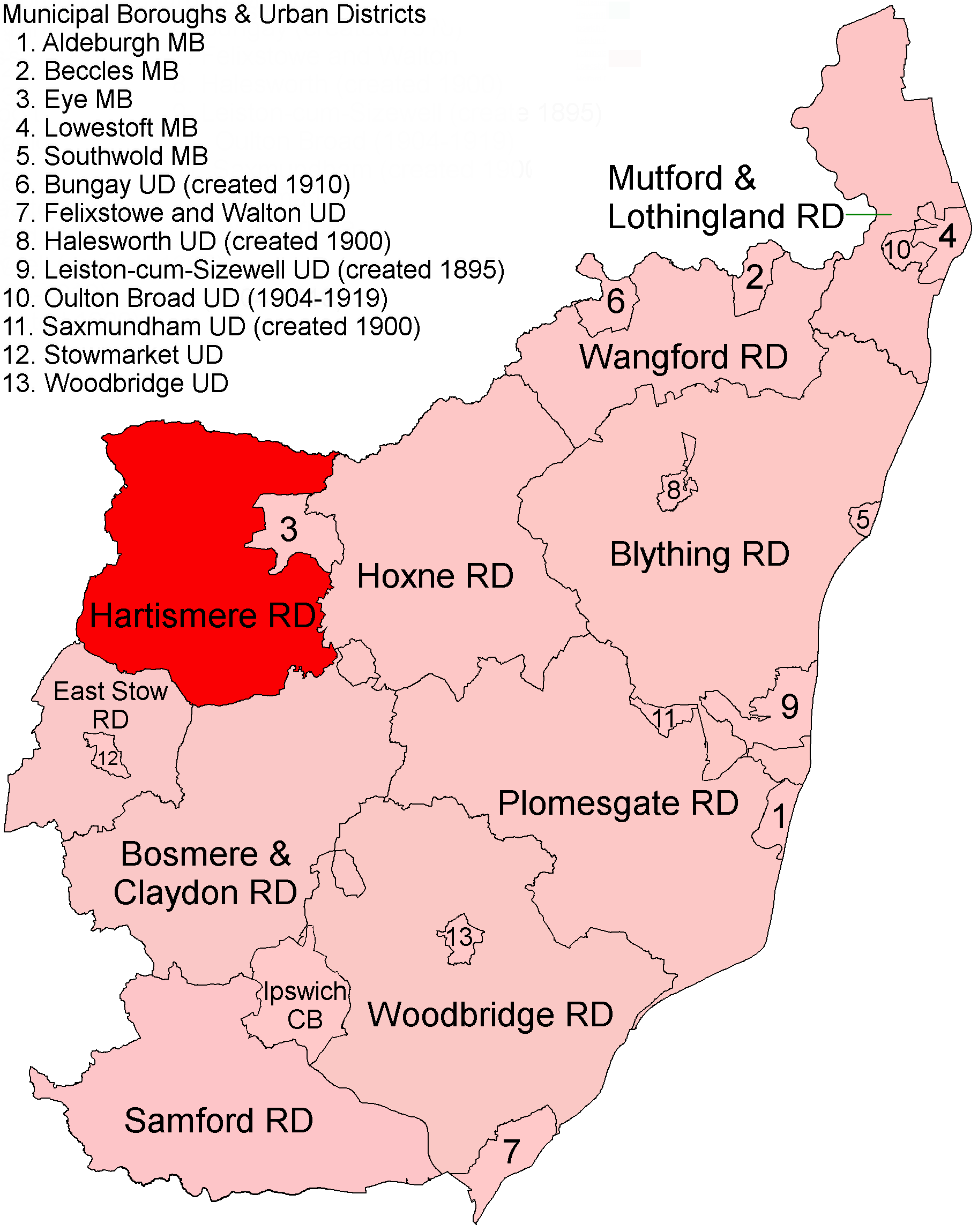
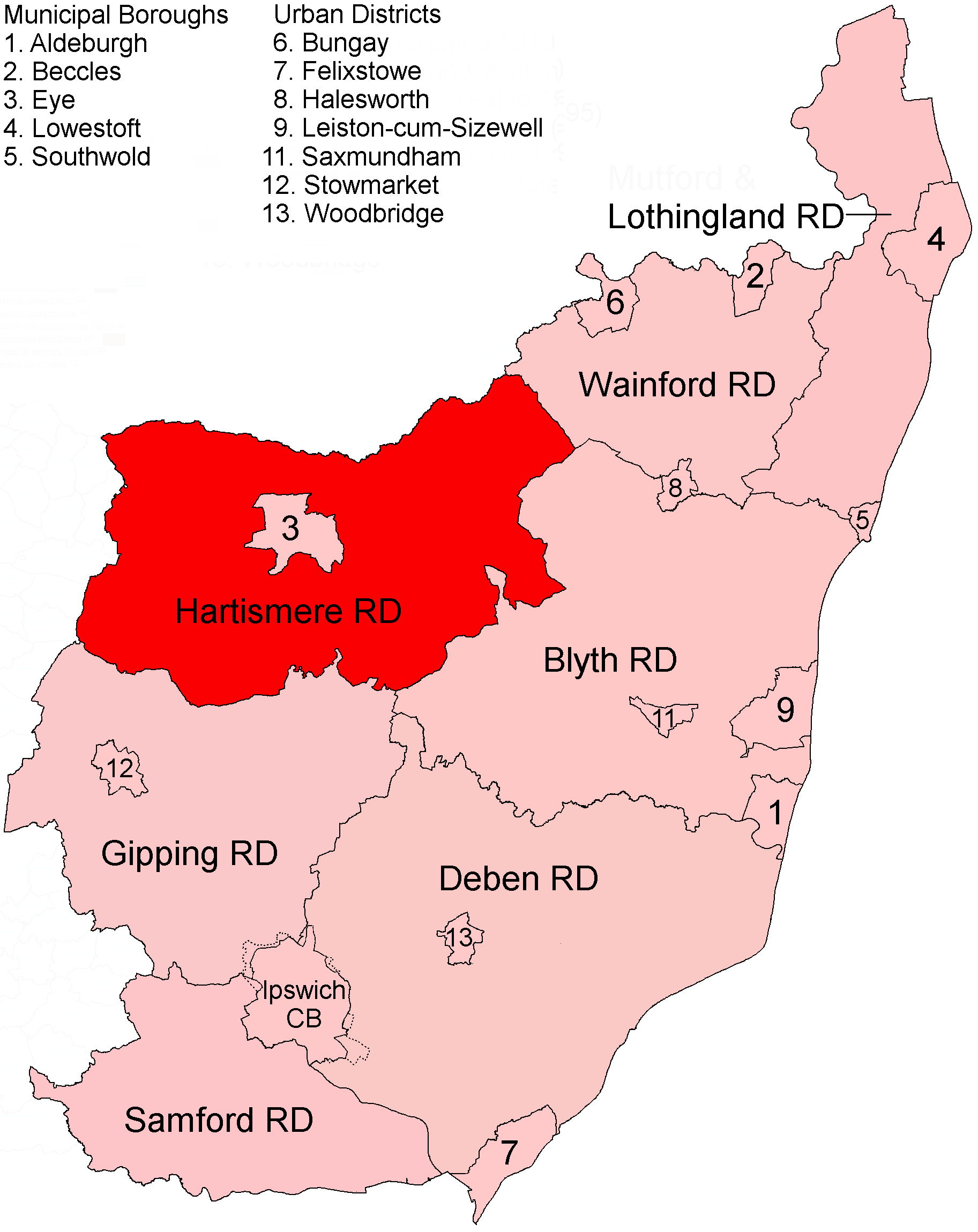
- Location within West Suffolk, 1894 Extended boundaries, 1934
- History
  - Created: 1894
  - Abolished: 1974
  - Succeeded by: Mid Suffolk District
- Status: Rural district
  - HQ: Eye

Hartismere Rural District was a rural district in the county of East Suffolk, England. It was expanded in 1934 by merging with the disbanded Hoxne Rural District with a slight readjustment of boundaries. It was named after the ancient Hundred of Hartismere and administered from Eye.

Since 1 April 1974 it has formed part of the District of Mid Suffolk.

At the time of its dissolution it consisted of 52 civil parishes.

== Statistics ==
Year	Area		Population	Density (pop/ha)
Year	acres	ha	Population	Density (pop/ha)
1911	50,100	20,275	11,485	0.57
1921	50,100	20,275	10,840	0.53
1931	50,100	20,275	10,405	0.51
1951	96,486	39,047	17,317	0.44
1961	96,486	39,047	16,169	0.41

== Parishes ==
Parish	From	Notes
Aspall		
Athelington	1934	From Hoxne RD
Bacton		
Bedfield	1934	From Hoxne RD
Bedingfield	1934	From Hoxne RD
Botesdale		
Braiseworth		
Brome		
Brundish	1934	From Hoxne RD
Burgate		
Cotton		
Denham	1934	From Hoxne RD
Finningham		
Fressingfield	1934	From Hoxne RD
Gislingham		
Horham	1934	From Hoxne RD
Hoxne	1934	From Hoxne RD
Kenton	1934	From Plomesgate RD
Laxfield	1934	From Hoxne RD
Mellis		
Mendham	1934	From Hoxne RD
Mendlesham		
Metfield	1934	From Hoxne RD
Monk Soham	1934	From Hoxne RD
Oakley		
Occold		
Palgrave		
Redgrave		
Redlingfield		
Rickinghall Superior		
Rishangles		
Southolt	1934	From Hoxne RD
Stoke Ash		
Stradbroke	1934	From Hoxne RD
Stuston		
Syleham	1934	From Hoxne RD
Tannington	1934	From Hoxne RD
Thorndon		
Thornham Magna		
Thornham Parva		
Thrandeston		
Thwaite		
Westhorpe		
Wetheringsett		
Weybread	1934	From Hoxne RD
Wickham Skeith		
Wilby	1934	From Hoxne RD
Wingfield	1934	From Hoxne RD
Worlingworth	1934	From Hoxne RD
Wortham		
Wyverstone		
Yaxley		
