= Hartismere Hundred =

Hundred of Suffolk, England

Coordinates: 52.30°N 1.07°E

Hartismere Hundred

Hartismere was a hundred of Suffolk, that later gave its name to a poor law union, a rural sanitary district, and the Hartismere Rural District.

Listed as Hertesmere in the Domesday Book, the name of the hundred is derived from "Hart's mere" where Hart is a personal name.

Hartismere also lends its name to the 11-19 Co-educational Foundation School in Eye. It serves pupils aged 11–16 years, while the associated sixth form college instructs 16-19 year students. The school is distinguished by its particularly close ties to the Hartismere Community. It is also the name of a hospital and maternity unit in Eye.

== Parishes ==
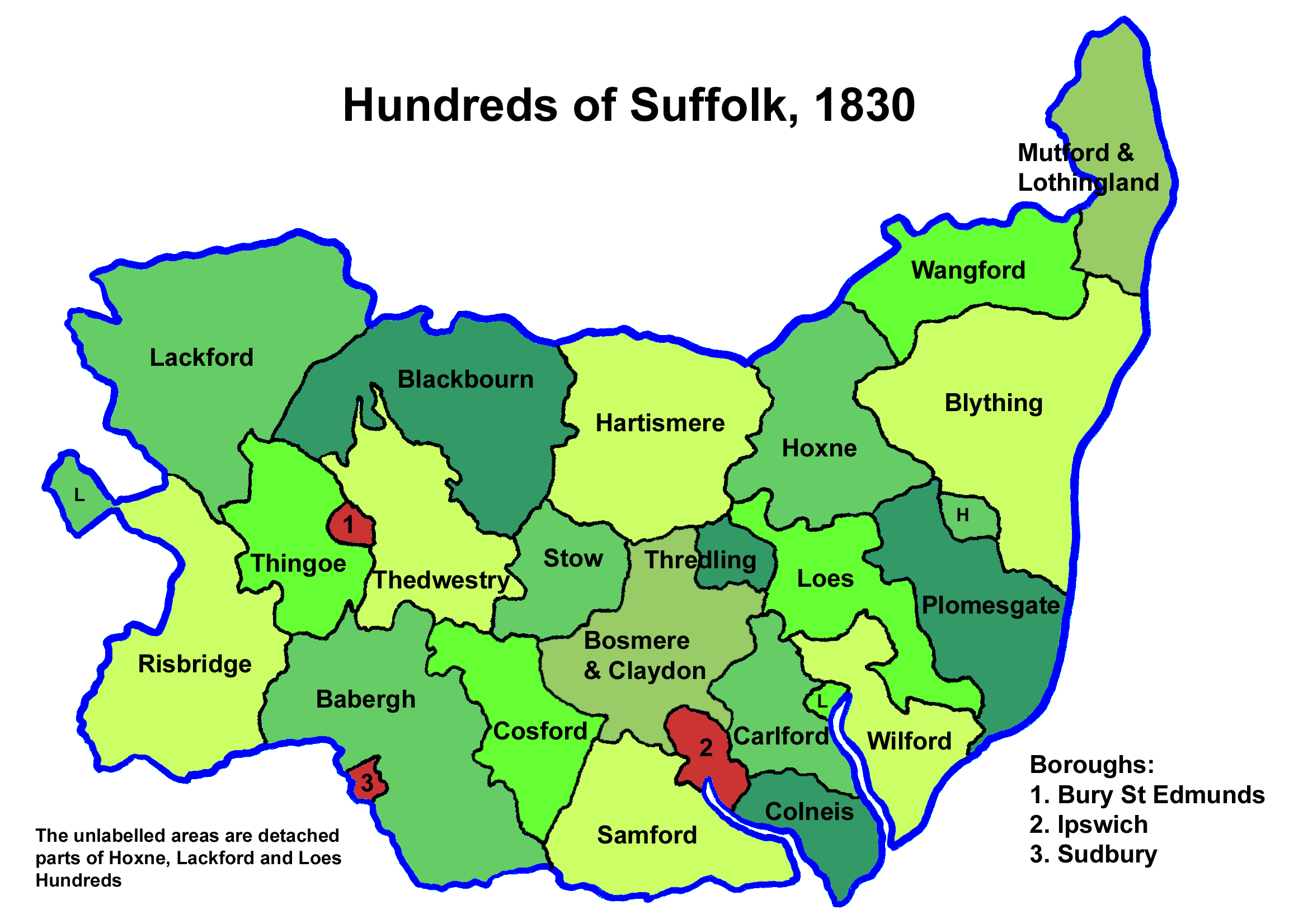
Suffolk hundreds

Hartismere Hundred consisted of the following 32 parishes:

Parish	Area (acres)
Aspall	827
Bacton	2231
Botesdale	1260
Braiseworth	722
Brome	893
Burgate	2034
Cotton	1922
Eye	4174
Finningham	1235
Gislingham	2251
Mellis	1344
Mendlesham	3880
Oakley	1280
Occold	1480
Palgrave	1475
Redgrave	2059
Redlingfield	1075
Rickinghall	1401
Rishangles	719
Stoke Ash	1173
Stuston	798
Thorndon	2680
Thornham Magna	1327
Thornham Parva	670
Thrandeston	1379
Thwaite	832
Westhorpe	1322
Wetheringsett-cum-Brockford	3777
Wickham Skeith	1770
Wortham	2727
Wyverstone	1523
Yaxley	1239
