= Creeting =

Creeting is part of the name of two villages in Suffolk, England:

- Creeting St Mary
- Creeting St Peter
