= Chickering, Suffolk =

Coordinates: 52.339600°N 1.2430644°E

Chickering
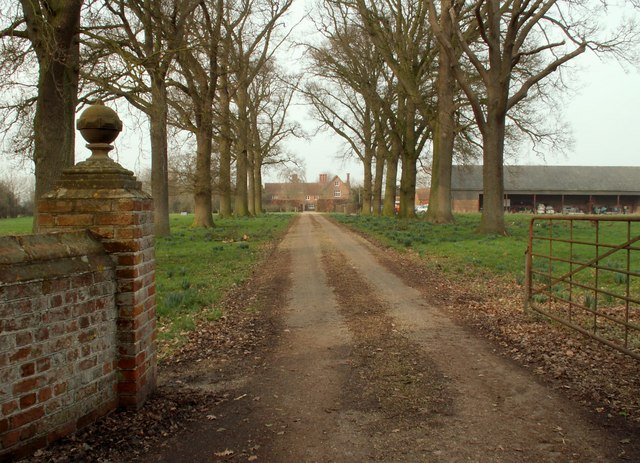
- Driveway to Chickering Hall

- Location within Suffolk
- OS grid reference: TM209761
- Civil parish: Hoxne
- District: Mid Suffolk
- Shire county: Suffolk
- Region: East
- Country: England
- Sovereign state: United Kingdom
- Postcode district: IP21
- Police: Suffolk
- Fire: Suffolk
- Ambulance: East of England

Chickering is a place in the civil parish of Hoxne, and the Mid Suffolk district of Suffolk, England. It is on the B118 Hoxne to Stradbroke road, and approximately 20 miles (30 km) north from the county town of Ipswich.

Chickering is listed in the Domesday Book (1086) as 'Ciccheli (n) ga'/'Cikelinga'/'Citiringa'. The entry shows Chickering in the Bishop's Hundred of Suffolk, with 13 households, 4 freemen, 0.5 men's plough teams, a meadow of 2 acres (0.01 km^{2}), and 20 pigs, with a tax revenue of 1.8 geld units. The freemen in 1066 were the lords of the manor, with their overlord being Edric of Laxfield. In 1086, after the Conquest, lordship was given to Walter son of Grip, under Robert Malet who was Tenant-in-chief to William the Conqueror.

At Chickering is the seventeenth-century 'Chickering Hall' and farm; the hall is a Grade II listed building within Wingfield parish, with its farm partly extending into Hoxne. The water features at Chickering Hall have largely been filled in. In 1900 Chickering Hall and its farm, one of two farms, was trade directory listed in the parish of Hoxne. No other Chickering trades or occupations were listed at the time in Hoxne or Wingfield.
