= Eye Town Hall =

Municipal building in Eye, Suffolk, England

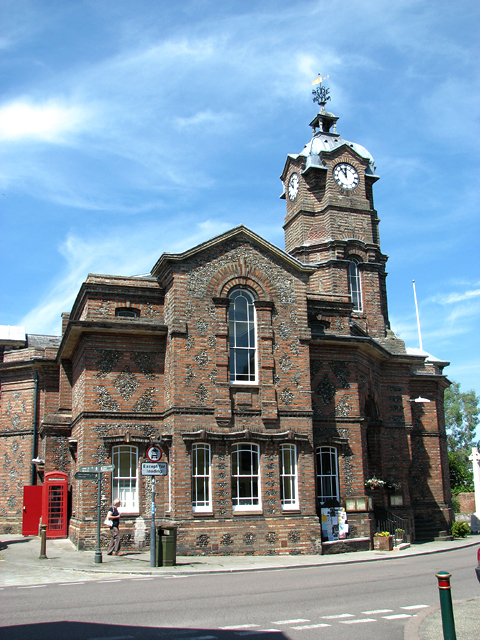
- Eye Town Hall

- Shown in Suffolk
- 52.3211°N 1.1461°E
- Location: Broad Street, Eye

History
- Built: 1857

Site notes
- Architect: Edward Buckton Lamb
- Architectural style: Italianate style

Listed Building – Grade II*
- Official name: Town Hall
- Designated: 20 October 1971
- Reference no.: 1316536

Eye Town Hall is a municipal building in Broad Street in Eye, Suffolk, England. The building, which is the meeting place of Eye Town Council, is a Grade II* listed building.

== History ==
The building was commissioned to replace the Corn Exchange in Broad Street, which had previously been used as a civic meeting place, and was largely paid for by the local member of parliament, Sir Edward Kerrison, 2nd Baronet. It was designed by Edward Buckton Lamb in the Italianate style, built in red and brown brick with rhombus-shaped sections of flint decoration and was completed in 1857.

The design involved an irregular and asymmetrical design with three bays facing east onto Broad Street. The central bay, which slightly projected forward, featured three narrow sash windows with cornices on the ground floor, a tall round headed sash window with an architrave on the first floor and a gable above; behind and to the right there was a two-stage tower with tall round headed windows in the first stage, a plain second stage and a dome and a lantern above. The north and south elevations both featured a single round headed casement window with a gable above, while west elevation featured five round headed casement windows with a cornice above. Internally, the principal rooms were the council chamber, which was on the first floor and reached by a spiral staircase, and the main hall. There was also a lock-up for petty criminals in the tower. A journalist writing for The Builder described the structure as a "very successful brick building", whereas the architectural historian, Nikolaus Pevsner, described it as "the horrible town hall of 1857 with the horrible tower".

A clock was installed in the second stage of tower at the expense of a local brewer and mayor, Charles Tacon, to celebrate the Diamond Jubilee of Queen Victoria in 1897. The building was the venue for the hotly-contested result in the 1906 Eye by-election, when the returning officer revealed that the Liberal Party candidate, Harold Pearson, had won by just 197 votes. A war memorial, in the form of a simple cross, which was intended to commemorate the lives of local service personnel who had died in the First World War, was unveiled outside the town hall in the presence of Colonel Sir Courtenay Warner on 24 July 1921. The leader of the British Union of Fascists, Sir Oswald Mosley, addressed a crowd in the town hall in January 1939 and claimed that, under a government led by him, "nothing would be imported into England that could be produced in this country."

The building continued to serve as the headquarters of the borough council for much of the 20th century, but ceased to be local seat of government when the enlarged Mid Suffolk District Council was formed in 1974. Instead, the building became the meeting place of Eye Town Council.

A limited programme of refurbishment works, which included repairs to the roof and to the brickwork, was carried out with financial support from the Heritage Lottery Fund and from English Heritage and was completed in March 2011. The building was included on the Heritage at Risk Register until a more significant programme of works, which included new toilets and upgraded lighting facilities, was carried out with financial support from Historic England, Suffolk County Council and Mid Suffolk District Council and completed in summer 2018. Works of art in the town hall included a painting by Martin Archer Shee of General Sir Edward Kerrison, 1st Baronet; four paintings, including the portrait of Kerrison were vandalised during the execution of the works.

== See also ==
- Grade II* listed buildings in Mid Suffolk
