= Robert de Finingham =

English monk

Robert de Finingham (died 1460) was an English monk in the Franciscan (Greyfriars) monastery at Norwich, and an author.

He was born at Finningham, Suffolk, and educated at the monastery where he later became a friar. He flourished in the reign of Henry VI. He is said to have been a very learned man, skilled, as Pits expressed it, "in all liberal arts, excelling especially in canon law", and was the author of numerous Latin works. The chief purpose of his writings was to defend the Franciscans against the common accusation that their profession of poverty was hypocritical.

The titles of his known works are as follows:

1. Pro Ordine Minorum
2. Pro Dignitate Status Eorum
3. Casus Conciliorum Angliæ
4. De Casibus Decretorum
5. De Casibus Decretalium
6. De Extravagantibus
7. De Excommunicationibus. Thomas Tanner describes a manuscript of this in John Moore's library, that is now in the Cambridge University Library (E. e. v. 11).
