= Langham, Suffolk =

Village in Suffolk, England

Coordinates: 52.29204°N 0.89974°E

Langham
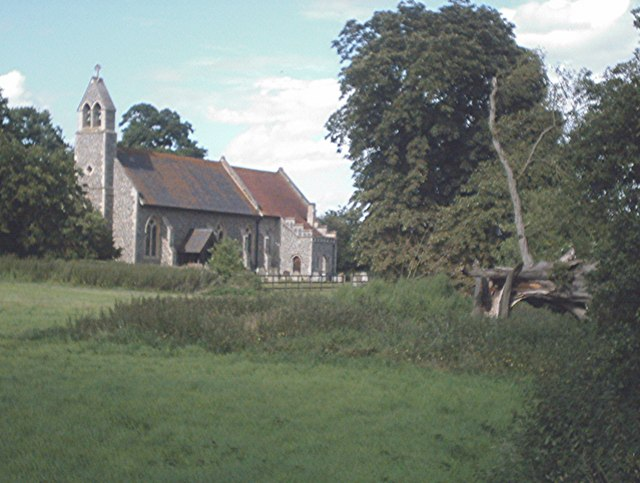
- St. Mary the Virgin, Langham

- Location within Suffolk
- Population: 90
- District: Mid Suffolk
- Shire county: Suffolk
- Region: East
- Country: England
- Sovereign state: United Kingdom
- Post town: Bury St Edmunds
- Postcode district: IP31
- Police: Suffolk
- Fire: Suffolk
- Ambulance: East of England

Langham is a village and civil parish in the Mid Suffolk district of Suffolk in eastern England. Located around seven miles north east of Bury St Edmunds, in 2005 its population was 90. The parish also contains the hamlet of Stock Hill.
