= Athelington =

Village in Suffolk, England

Coordinates: 52°17′38″N 1°14′06″E

- Village
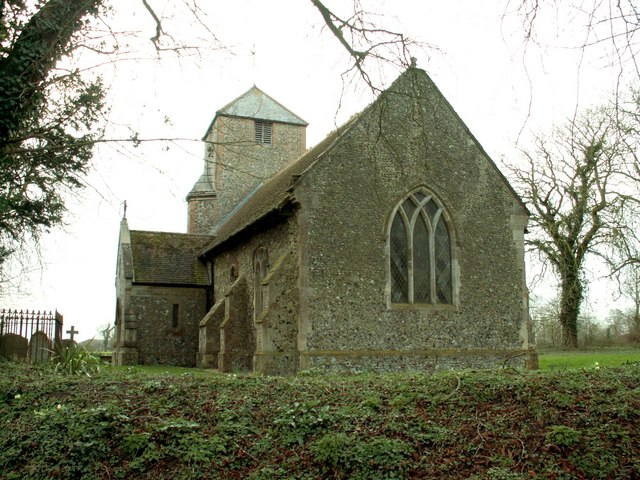
- St Peter's Church, Athelington

- Location within Suffolk
- Area: 2.00 km^{2} (0.77 sq mi)
- Population: 30 (2005 Est.)
  - Density: 15/km^{2} (39/sq mi)
- OS grid reference: TL210710
- District: Mid Suffolk
- Shire county: Suffolk
- Region: East
- Country: England
- Sovereign state: United Kingdom
- Post town: Eye
- Postcode district: IP21
- Dialling code: 01728
- Police: Suffolk
- Fire: Suffolk
- Ambulance: East of England
- UK Parliament: Central Suffolk and North Ipswich

Athelington is a small village and civil parish in the Mid Suffolk district of Suffolk, England, about 12 miles (19 km) south-east from Diss. The name is derived from the Old English word Ætheling. The population of the village was less than 50 at the 2011 Census and is included in the civil parish of Redlingfield; in 2005 the population was estimated as 30.

The villages name means 'Farm/settlement of the prince(s)'.

The village is first recorded as Elyngtone in 942 in the will of Bishop Theodred granting lands to a community dedicated to St Æthelberht in Hoxne. It was not recorded in the Domesday Book of 1086.

There are six listed buildings in the parish with the church of St Peter being II* listed and the remaining five being grade II listed including the 17th Century Athelington Hall.

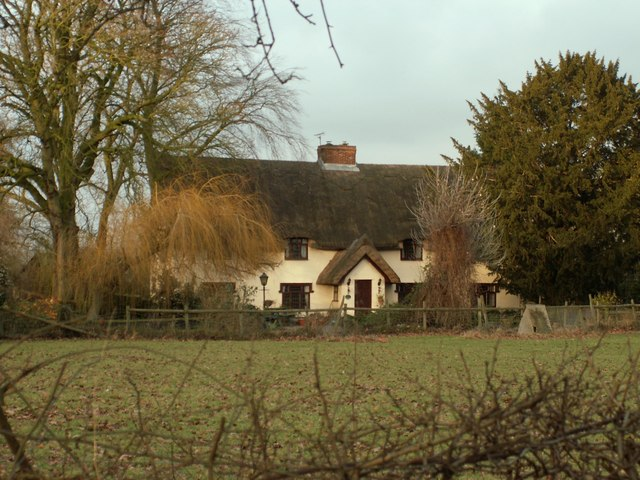
Thatched cottage at White Hall Farm

== Church of St Peter ==
The church of St Peter is medieval in origin and was majorly restored both internally and externally in 1873–1874. The early 14th-century nave and chancel are made of flint rubble with stone dressings, with the 15th-century tower being constructed of knapped flint with an admixture of red brick. There is a bare-faced flint porch which was added in 1873 with a memorial inscription. Three bells hang in the tower, all cast in 1450 by John Magges of Norwich, and are currently unringable. The largest weighs approximately 450 pounds (200 kg) and has a diameter of 28 inches (71 cm).

== Governance ==
The parish was part of the historic Hoxne Hundred. Between 1894 and 1934 it was in Hoxne Rural District before transferring to Hartismere Rural District which in turn was abolished in 1974 by the Local Government Act 1972. Today Athelington lies in the Mid Suffolk District of the shire county of Suffolk. The four tiers of government & their respective representatives are:

- Central Suffolk and North Ipswich UK Parliament constituency, Dan Poulter
- Suffolk County Council Hoxne & Eye division, Guy McGregor
- Mid Suffolk District Council Hoxne and Worlingworth ward, Matthew Hicks
- Horham and Athelington Parish Council with 7 elected parish councilors.

== Historical writings ==
In 1870–72, John Marius Wilson's Imperial Gazetteer of England and Wales described the village as:

ATHELINGTON, or Allington, a parish in Hoxne district, Suffolk; 5 miles SE by E of Eye, and 8 NW of Framlingham r. station. Post Town, Horham under Wickham-Market. Acres, 487. Real property, £926. Pop., 115. Houses, 24. The property is not much divided. The living is a rectory in the diocese of Norwich. Value, £155. Patron, the Lord Chancellor. The church is good.

In 1887, John Bartholomew also wrote an entry on Athelington in the Gazetteer of the British Isles with a much shorter description:

Athelington, parish, East Suffolk, 5 miles SE. of Eye and 7 m. NW. of Framlingham railway. station., 487 acres., population. 118.

== Population change ==
Athelington from 1801 to 1961
Year	1801	1811	1821	1831	1841	1851	1881	1891	1901	1911	1921	1931	1951	1961
Population	70	83	100	129	111	117	118	106	87	77	54	71	38	47
Number of Houses	-	-	-	14	26	26	27	23	20	-	14	14	12	15
Source: A Vision of Britain Through Time
