= Wickham Skeith =

Village in Suffolk, England

Coordinates: 52.279°N 1.073°E

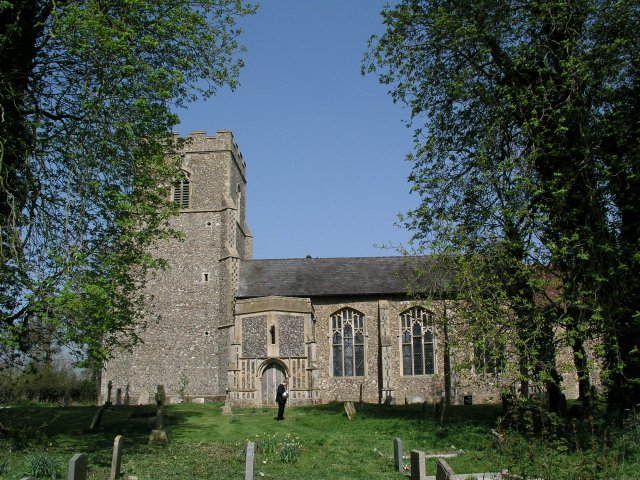
- Church of St Andrew

- Location within Suffolk
- Population: 321 (2011)
- District: Mid Suffolk
- Shire county: Suffolk
- Region: East
- Country: England
- Sovereign state: United Kingdom
- Post town: Eye
- Postcode district: IP23

Wickham Skeith is a village and civil parish in Suffolk, England, about 5 miles to the west of Eye and about 3 miles east of Finningham.

== History ==
The village was mentioned in 1086 in the Domesday Book as Wicham, an Anglo-Saxon name for a house near a Roman settlement, which would apply either to Stoke Ash or to the Roman farm found near Wickham Skeith itself. Skeith is first recorded as part of the name in the 13th century; it is Old Norse for a border or boundary, and may have originally applied to the part of the village that extends from the high ground surrounding the village green along The Street, parallel to the River Dove, which is close to the parish boundary.

Traditionally an agricultural village, Wickham Skeith has declined in population in recent centuries. There were 613 residents of the parish in 1851, 564 in the 1870s, 415 at the 1901 census, and 321 in 2011.

The pond on the village green, called the Grimmer, was the location of one of the last "swimmings" as a test of witchcraft in the country, in July 1825. Isaac Stebbings, a pedlar aged about 67, was accused of driving two people insane by black magic. He was immersed repeatedly and floated each time; a second trial with a man of similar size was planned, but the clergyman and churchwardens prevented it.

A windmill and a steam mill were next to the green; on 13 January 1890, the boiler of the steam mill exploded and 6-year-old Edward Rosier was struck on the head by a flying brick and died on 5 February.

== Buildings ==
St Andrew's Church dates to the 14th century, with a Decorated west tower and the remainder in the later Perpendicular style, and was restored in 1858. The nave and chancel windows may be by master mason Hawes of Occold (fl. 1410–40). A modern etched glass window is dated 1998, by Walter Wilson.

Wickham Hall was rebuilt as a rectory in 1846.

The village hall was built in 1909 as a men's reading room. The Swan Inn public house, originally built in the 15th century, closed in 1967.

== Notable residents ==
Film sound recordist Peter Handford and his wife the actress Helen Fraser lived in Wickham Skeith until his death.
