= Creeting St Peter =

Village in Suffolk, England

Coordinates: 52.183°N 1.040°E

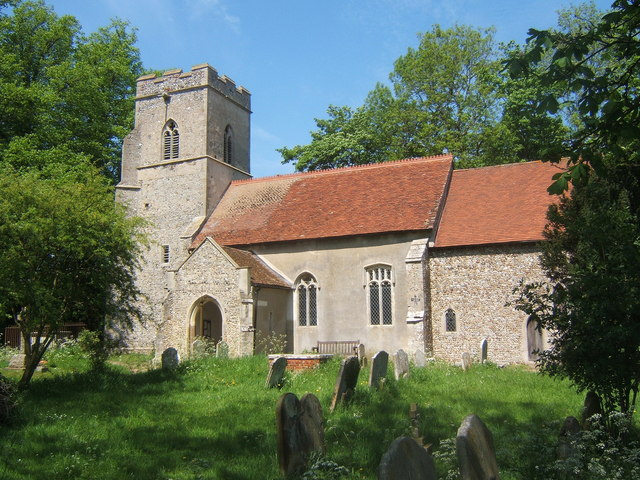
- Church of St Peter

- Location within Suffolk
- Population: 260 (2001); 275 (2011)
- District: Mid Suffolk
- Shire county: Suffolk
- Region: East
- Country: England
- Sovereign state: United Kingdom
- Post town: Ipswich
- Postcode district: IP6
- Police: Suffolk
- Fire: Suffolk
- Ambulance: East of England

Creeting St Peter is a village and civil parish in the Mid Suffolk district of Suffolk in eastern England. Located to the north of the A14 road between Stowmarket and Needham Market, in 2005 its population was 260. increasing to 275 at the 2011 Census.
