= Braiseworth =

Village in Suffolk, England

Coordinates: 52.29°N 01.12°E

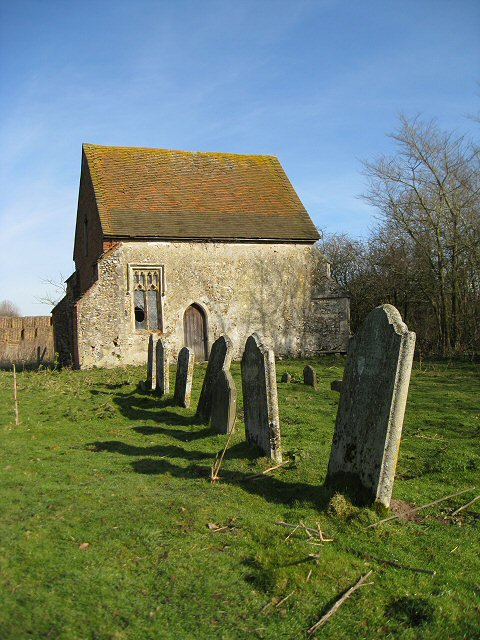
- Remains of St Mary's Church

- Location within Suffolk
- Interactive map of Braiseworth
- District: Mid Suffolk
- Shire county: Suffolk
- Region: East
- Country: England
- Sovereign state: United Kingdom
- Post town: EYE
- Postcode district: IP23
- Police: Suffolk
- Fire: Suffolk
- Ambulance: East of England

Braiseworth is a village in Suffolk, England. the village is mentioned in the Domesday Book, and its name means Briosa's enclosure in Old English. It has never reached any great size, and no longer has its own parish church. The medieval church was dismantled in the 1850s, parts being incorporated into the new church, consecrated in 1857 and designed by the Victorian "rogue" architect Edward Buckton Lamb, who also designed the controversial town hall at nearby Eye. This new church was disused in the 1970s and is now a private house.

Braiseworth has one interesting literary association, as it was here that New Zealand author Janet Frame lived for a short period in or around 1963 following a chance meeting with the owners in London. She based her 1965 novel The Adaptable Man on her experiences whilst living there.
