= Bedfield =

Village in Suffolk, England

Coordinates: 52.25°N 1.25°E

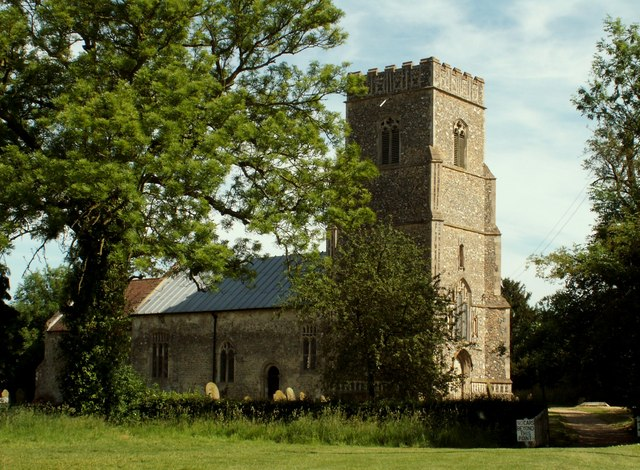
- Church of St Nicholas, Bedfield

- Location within Suffolk
- Interactive map of Bedfield
- Population: 324 (2011 census)
- District: Mid Suffolk
- Shire county: Suffolk
- Region: East
- Country: England
- Sovereign state: United Kingdom
- Post town: Woodbridge
- Postcode district: IP13

Bedfield is a village and civil parish in the Mid Suffolk district of Suffolk, England.
