= Denham, Mid Suffolk =

Village in Suffolk, England

Coordinates: 52.311°N 1.197°E

Denham
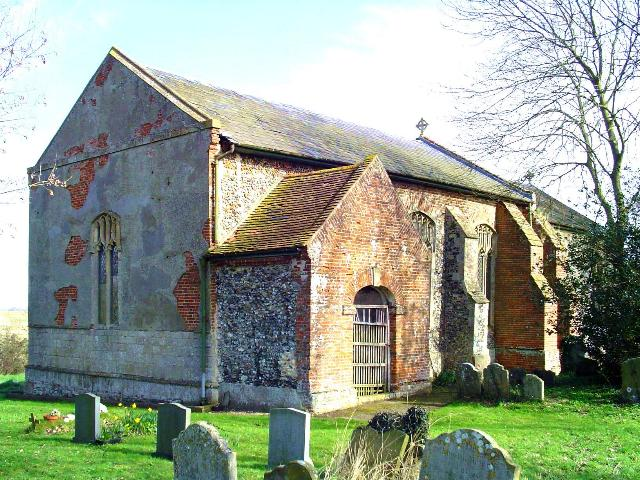
- St John the Baptist church

- Location within Suffolk
- Population: 137 (2011)
- OS grid reference: TM180729
- District: Mid Suffolk
- Shire county: Suffolk
- Region: East
- Country: England
- Sovereign state: United Kingdom
- Post town: Eye
- Postcode district: IP21
- Dialling code: 01379

Denham is a village and civil parish in northern Suffolk. Located approximately 3 miles east of Eye, it is within the district of Mid Suffolk. It shares its name with Denham (St Edmundsbury), another Suffolk village.

Denham's small population is rather scattered, but chiefly clustered along Hoxne Road and The Street, the latter marked on some maps as 'Denham Street'. The parish boundary runs along both these roads meaning the majority of the houses in the parish are at its very edge. After years in planning, a village sign was unveiled near Shingle Hill Corner on 27 September 2008.

The Street is one of over 100 roads so named in Suffolk, typically reserved for the main thoroughfare through a 'street village'. The Street in Denham is unusual in that it is now a no-through road, though it is reasonable to suggest that at one time it was the main street for Denham, and presumably led somewhere, perhaps to Redlingfield to the south.

The parish church of St John the Baptist is small but full of interest. It stands a little isolated from the main area of settlement, as is common in some East Anglian parishes. Chiefly dating from the 14th and 15th centuries it comprises the nave (with outward bowing walls), chancel, Victorian vestry and redbrick entrance porch. A west tower is thought to have been removed in the early 18th century - the 'new' west wall is chiefly built of red brick. The octagonal font has been restored and is very plain. In the sanctuary is a brass to Anthony Bedingfield, the third son of Sir Edward Bedingfield, 1574, with a palimpsest of Jacobus Wegheschede, c 1500. A bell turret contained a single bell, now to be found by the organ and inscribed I.D. 1614. 3 bells are recorded in 1553, suggesting the west tower still stood at the time. A north chapel has long been removed and the arch blocked in with brick. Here can be found memorials to the Bedingfield family. The building was in a rather parlous state (2009) but since then has been fully repaired chiefly using English Heritage funding.

White's Directory of 1844 lists 313 'souls' living in the parish. Apart from farmers, the only trades listed included a corn miller, wheelwright, blacksmith and two beerhouse keepers. By 1937 the situation had changed little except for the disappearance of the miller and addition of a grocery-cum-post office, though the population as of 1931 had fallen to 170. Since then the post office has closed and the only building used for community purposes (apart from the church) is the Village Hall, formerly a guard's hut for Horham Airfield.

Indeed, Denham sits amidst an historic landscape of WW2 airfields. Immediately to the east is the site of RAF Horham ('Horrum') airfield (so large that it straddled Denham, Horham and Hoxne parishes), used by the USAAF 95th Bomb Group from 1943 to 1945. Adjacent to Redlingfield Wood in Denham parish is the site of the airfield hospital which has been restored as a museum and a memorial those who served with the 95th in WW2. The Officer's Club at Horham airfield (the 'Red Feather Club', also within Denham parish) has been preserved and like the hospital is occasionally open over summer months. Rumour has it that Glenn Miller, the American Big 'swing' Band leader visited the old Green Man public house in Denham around the time he and his band played at Horham air base on September 10, 1944.

Other airfields near Denham included Eye (to the west), Thorpe Abbotts (to the north) and Mendlesham towards the south.
