= Rishangles =

Village in Suffolk, England

Coordinates: 52.274°N 1.168°E

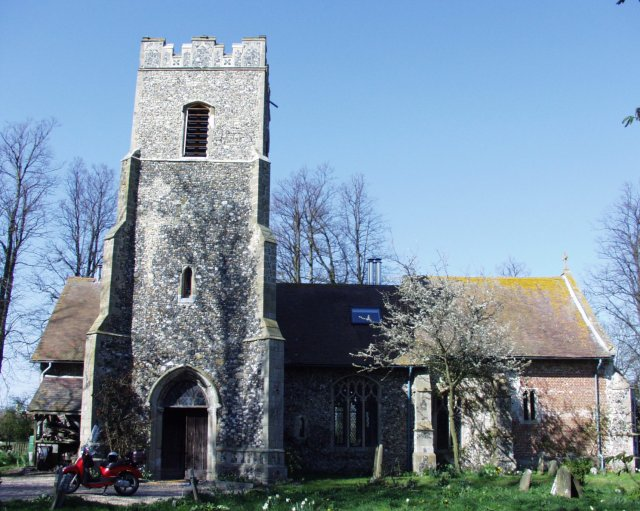
- St Margaret's Rishangles: the former church, now a private residence

- Location within Suffolk
- Population: 80
- District: Mid Suffolk
- Shire county: Suffolk
- Region: East
- Country: England
- Sovereign state: United Kingdom
- Post town: Eye
- Postcode district: IP23
- Police: Suffolk
- Fire: Suffolk
- Ambulance: East of England

Rishangles is a village and civil parish in the Mid Suffolk district of Suffolk in eastern England.

The place-name 'Rishangles' is first attested in the Domesday Book of 1086, where it appears as Risangra in the ancient hundred of Hartismere. The name means 'brushwood slope', the second element being related to the word 'hanger' meaning 'hanging wood'.

The manor of Rishangles was held until his death in September 1478 by Edward Grimston, who also held the manor of Thorndon. They passed to his son Edward (1462-1520). Edward Grimston was well-connected, and his third marriage (1471) to Philippa, daughter of John Tiptoft, 1st Baron Tiptoft and sister of the Earl of Worcester was held in the presence of John de la Pole, 2nd Duke of Suffolk and his wife Elizabeth Plantagenet, sister of Kings Edward IV and Richard III.

Located around seven miles south of Diss, in 2005 its population was 80. At the 2011 the population was included in the civil parish of Bedingfield. Despite its small population the village is at one time believed to have been home to three churches. Following the closure of both the Methodist church and the Grade II* listed Parish church, St Margaret's, only the Baptist Church remains open.
