= Thorndon, Suffolk =

Village in Suffolk, England

Coordinates: 52.286°N 1.128°E

Thorndon
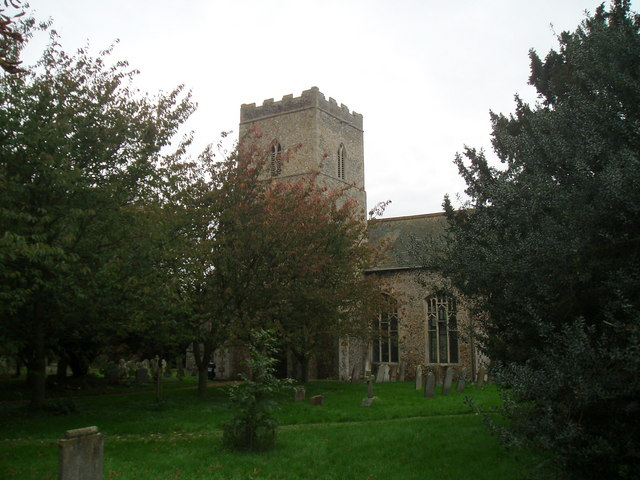
- All Saints Church, Thorndon

- Location within Suffolk
- Population: 648 (2011)
- OS grid reference: TM126719
  - London: 92 mi (148 km)
- District: Mid Suffolk
- Shire county: Suffolk
- Region: East
- Country: England
- Sovereign state: United Kingdom
- Post town: Eye
- Postcode district: IP23
- Dialling code: 01379
- Police: Suffolk
- Fire: Suffolk
- Ambulance: East of England

Thorndon is a village and civil parish in the Mid Suffolk district of Suffolk in eastern England. The village is located around three miles south of Eye, close to the A140. It is located 92 miles northeast of London. In 2011, the population was 648, as recorded by the 2011 census. Village facilities include All Saints' Church and a local primary school.

== History ==
The origin of the name Thorndon traces back to Old English, meaning 'Thorn Hill', coming from 'þorn' meaning a hawthorn-tree and 'dūn' meaning a hill. Thorndon was documented in Domesday Book as being within the hundred of Hartismere in 1066, describing it as Hill where thorn-trees grow and having a population of just 43 people in 1086. It was also recorded to have two manors in 1066, the main one being owned by the Wulfeva family and the other by the Turchetal family. Twenty years after the invasion by William the Bastard, the feudal baron Robert Malet was tenant-in-chief.

In 1337, the manor was owned by Robert d'Ufford and All Saints' Church was added. In the 1870s, John Marius Wilson described it as:

A parish, with a village, in Hartismere district, Suffolk; 3 miles S of Eye r. station. The church is ancient but good and has been restored. There are a reformatory, a national school, and townlands.

Thorndon is home to one church, All Saints' Church. Listed as a Grade II building since 1955, it displays exceptional 15th-century carvings on its front of grinning lions and angels crafted locally in the nearby town of Occold.

The boundaries of Thorndon have not changed, with the parish being located to the south of Eye. In the early 19th century, the only education people of the parish received was at Sunday school, as there were no schools in the parish until 1833 when an infant school was built. However, in 1856, it was brought and turned into a reformatory by Sir Edward Kerrison. This was subsequently acquired by the Kerrinson Trust and turned into a conference centre for the parish to use.

== Demographics ==
The earliest records of Thorndon's population date back to 1811, with the total population being 580. In 1851, it reached its highest total population of 725, but then slowly decreased to the last recorded figure of 468 from the 2011 census; this could be due to some reasons, such as industrialisation and people moving to urban areas. However, in 1931, it dipped to its lowest population. Thorndon was home to 272 houses in 2014; in modern times there has been a drop in population meaning less cramped living conditions compared to the 139 houses when population was at 675 in 1870.

90% of Thorndon is made up of White British people, with the other 10% being Black or Asian; this is mainly due to the rural location of the town. Thorndon has an aging population, with many being over 60 years old, shown by the census conducted in 2011

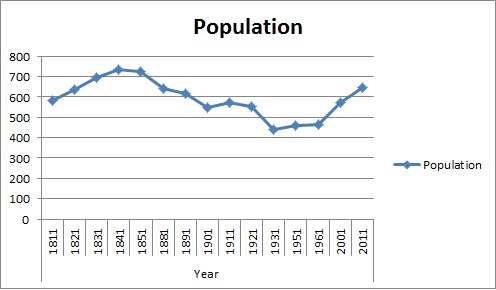
The total population of Thorndon civil parish, as reported by the Census of Population from 1811 to 2011

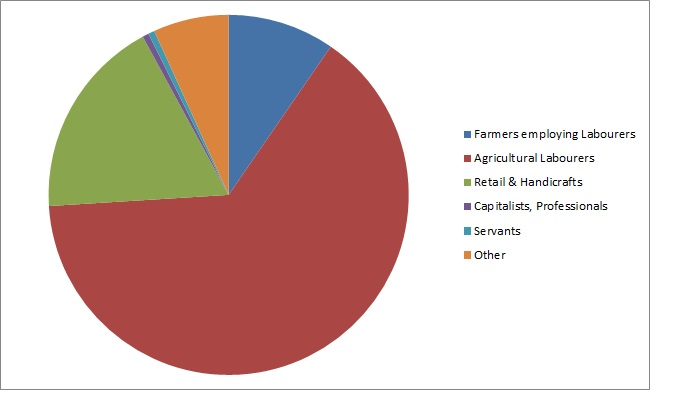
Pie Graph showing the percentage of occupation types in Thorndon, Suffolk in 1831

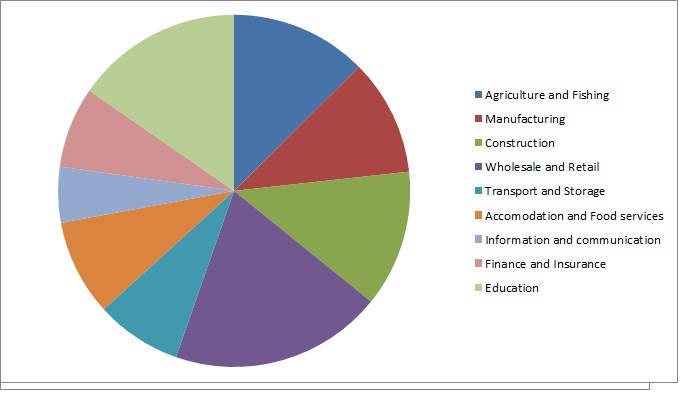
Pie Graph showing the occupation types according to the 2011 census

The Census Report of 2011 also shows that 90% of the population are of very good health or good health. This could be due to the affluent area of Thorndon is.

According to the 2011 census, the predominant occupation in Thorndon is agriculture and construction, this is due to the rural nature of the town. Other popular occupations include manufacturing and retail trade, which have become increasingly popular in recent years.

== Places of interest ==
- Church of All Saints A church of the Hartismere parish built in the 13th century by Robert De Ufford, Earl of Suffolk. Later improvements include an oak screen built by the local craftsman Brian Atkinson. Community activities take place at the church, such as the T Plus Community Café and the Cafe Church. The latter takes place on one Sunday of every month and brings the community together, allowing them to have something to eat whilst being entertained by the Parable Players. The lychgate at the entry to the church contains a village war memorial commemorating World War II.
- The Black Horse A traditional country pub in the middle of Thorndon. Originally built as the Black Horse Inn in the 1600s, it was later converted into a pub. In 1998 a fire destroyed most of the roof, but the pub was restored and reopened. The village no longer has its own post office, and so a mobile post office is parked in the pub car park on some mornings.
- Thorndon CEVC primary school A Church of England Voluntary Controlled school catering for children of any religion aged between 4 and 11. Being a Church of England school, it associates with the community, participates in church assemblies, and celebrates other Christian events. The school has around 60 pupils with up to 12 children in each year. Thorndon does not contain any secondary schools; the nearest one is Hartismere School in Eye which also has a sixth form college.
- Thorndon Community Shop A community shop open 7 days a week. It was originally run by the landlord of The Black Horse, but has since been handed over to the community to run. It is staffed by local volunteers, and additional funding has come from the parish, district, and county councils. The shop stocks local produce, including bread from the Tudor Bakehouse in Eye and milk from the Halesworth Dairy. There is also a photocopier available.
- Thorndon Leek Club A social club founded in 1995. It celebrates the village community spirit through socials, competitions, and local events. Its biggest event is the September show, held at the Black Horse. The club has regular meetings to discuss village events and how to support the church, school, pub, and other places in the village.
