= Mellis =

Village in Suffolk, England

Coordinates: 52.329°N 1.080°E

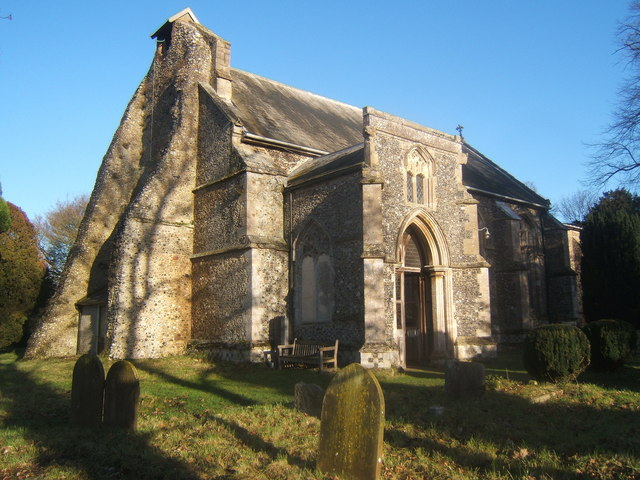
- St Mary's church, Mellis

- Location within Suffolk
- Population: 519 (2011)
- District: Mid Suffolk
- Shire county: Suffolk
- Region: East
- Country: England
- Sovereign state: United Kingdom
- Post town: Eye
- Postcode district: IP23
- Dialling code: 01379

Mellis is a small village in Suffolk, England. It has the largest area of unfenced common land in England. Oliver Cromwell exercised his troops in Mellis. It once had a railway station on the main line between London and Norwich, and a small branch line that ran to nearby Eye.

Mellis Common is a 59 hectare nature reserve. In summer rare plants such as green-winged orchid, sulphur clover and adder's tongue fern flourish. The abundance of small mammals also makes the site a favourite hunting ground for barn owl and tawny owl.

A number of public works on the Common, including tree planting and establishment of a football pitch, were undertaken in the 1970s by local farmer Don Rush of Home Farm

Running diagonally across the Common is The Carnser; a footpath running alongside drainage ditches, taking its name from colloquial East Anglian dialect.

The 14th-century parish church of St Mary, restored in 1859 and 1900, is a Grade II* listed building.

In 1968, Roger Deakin (1943 – 2006), writer and environmentalist, bought Walnut Tree Farm on the edge of Mellis Common, which he rebuilt over many years and where he lived until his death.
