= Thornham Magna =

Village in Suffolk, England

Coordinates: 52.3°N 1.083°E

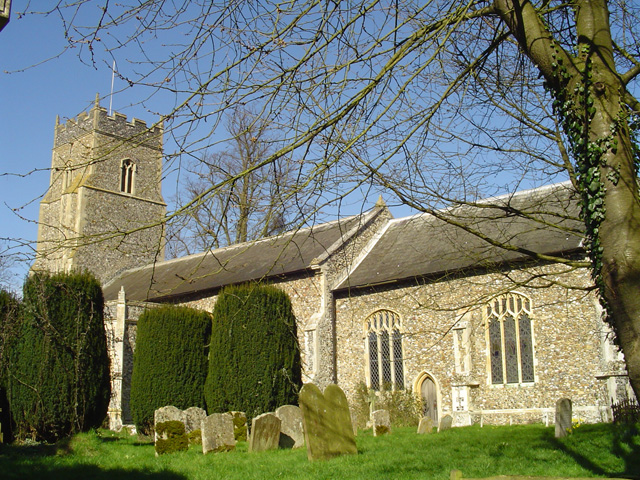
- Church of St Mary Magdalene

- Location within Suffolk
- Population: 210 (2011)
- District: Mid Suffolk
- Shire county: Suffolk
- Region: East
- Country: England
- Sovereign state: United Kingdom
- Post town: Eye
- Postcode district: IP23
- UK Parliament: Waveney Valley

Thornham Magna is the larger sister village of Thornham Parva on the former estate of Thornham Hall, the Henniker family seat, in Suffolk. It is about 3.5 miles (5.6 km) from Eye and close to the A140 road from Norwich to Ipswich.

The two villages, both mentioned in Magna Carta, are a mile or two apart in an area of mostly arable farming and cattle grazing on the water meadows through which the River Dove flows. Their combined population was approximately 170 in 2001, 210 in 2011.

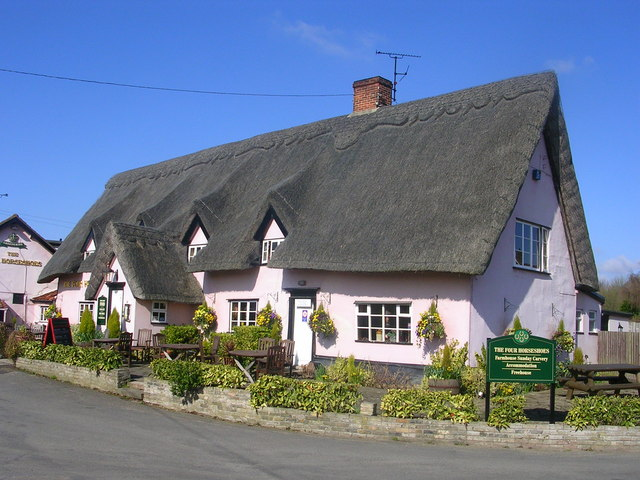
The Four Horseshoes, 2006

Thornham Magna has several oak-beamed, thatched Tudor houses, a forge workshop, and a village hall.

The Four Horseshoes pub is grade II* listed; the building dates to the 15th century.

The village church, St Mary Magdalene, was the Henniker family church. Originally built in the 14th century to replace a 12th-century church, with a Decorated chancel and Perpendicular additions and a Green Man carved above the porch entrance, it was extensively remodelled in the 1850s in Victorian Gothic style. The stained glass includes work by William Miller from the 1850s and W. G. Taylor from the 1880s, and one by Morris and Co reusing figures by Edward Burne Jones of St John flanked by the two Marys as they would stand at the foot of the Cross. Among the memorials is a sculpture by John Kendrick in which allegorical figures of Faith and Hope flank an urn on which John Henniker-Major and his wife are depicted in profile.

Thornham Hall, at Thornham Magna, was built in the Tudor period on an E-shaped plan and remodelled in the 17th century and again in the second half of the 19th century, by Sydney Smirke, to resemble a French château. After the First World War most of the estate was sold and the 95-room hall was first let, then reduced greatly in size and the remainder adapted as a modern house. It was requisitioned during the Second World War to house prisoners of war and then let to a school for problem children. In 1954 it was destroyed by fire. The current house, built in 1956 in historical style, is now operated by the ninth Baron Henniker and his wife as a bed and breakfast. Thornham Walks are open to the public; the 19th-century glass houses have been restored and the walled garden redesigned by Peter Thoday as an orchard for training people with disabilities.
