= Burgate =

Village in Suffolk, England

Coordinates: 52.339°N 1.058°E

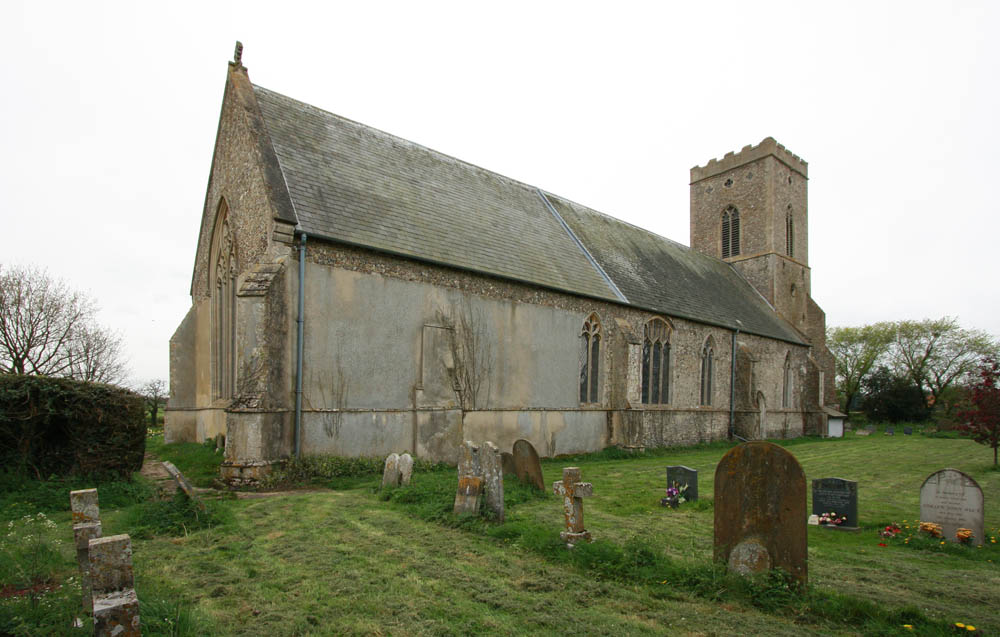
- St Mary's Church, Burgate

- Location within Suffolk
- Population: 162 (2001 census)
- District: Mid Suffolk
- Shire county: Suffolk
- Region: East
- Country: England
- Sovereign state: United Kingdom
- Post town: Diss
- Postcode district: IP22

Burgate is a small village and civil parish in the Mid Suffolk district of Suffolk, England, about 5 miles (8 km) south-west of Diss in Norfolk. The church, dedicated to St Mary and dating from the 14th century, was restored in 1864 and is a Grade II* listed building. The parish includes the villages of Little Green (south of Burgate) and Great Green (north).

Burgate Wood is a Site of Special Scientific Interest SSSI. Its 75 acres (300,000 m^{2}) are particularly good example of the type of oak-hornbeam woodland characteristic of this part of north Suffolk. It is ancient, with a coppice-with-standards structure and continues to support entirely semi-natural stands. Many giant coppiced stools are present which indicate its great antiquity. The ground flora is diverse and includes several species that are indicators of ancient woodland, including one rarity. The ground flora contains much Dog's Mercury (Mercurialis perennis) with frequent Primrose (Primula vulgaris), Enchanter's Nightshade (Circaea lutetiana), Sanicle (Sanicula europaea) and Water Avens (Geum rivale). A number of uncommon species are present including Herb Paris (Paris quadrifolia), Yellow Archangel (Lamiastrum galeobdolon), Hairy Woodrush (Luzula pilosa) and the rare Lungwort (Pulmonaria officinalis).

The wood west of the church contains earthwork remains of a ringwork, thought to be the site of a medieval manor house. There have been associated finds of pottery dated as Late Saxon to Medieval, i.e. 1001 AD to 1154 AD.
