= Occold =

Village in Suffolk, England

Coordinates: 52°17′33″N 1°09′40″E

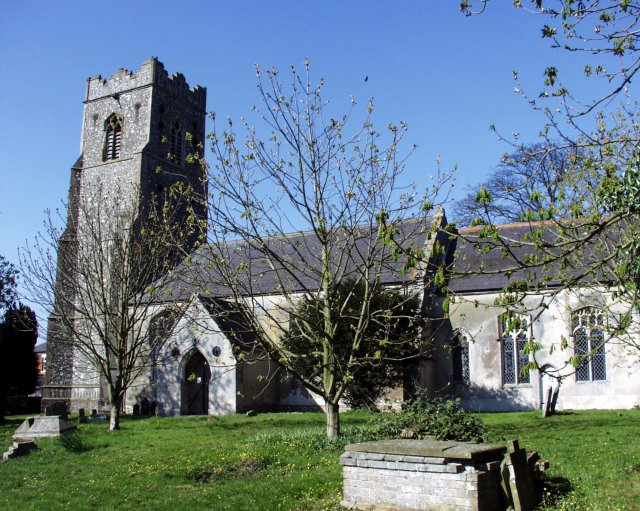
- Occold church

- Location within Suffolk
- Population: 519 (2011)
- OS grid reference: TM1570
- District: Mid Suffolk
- Shire county: Suffolk
- Region: East
- Country: England
- Sovereign state: United Kingdom
- Post town: EYE
- Postcode district: IP23
- Dialling code: 01379
- Police: Suffolk
- Fire: Suffolk
- Ambulance: East of England
- UK Parliament: Central Suffolk and North Ipswich

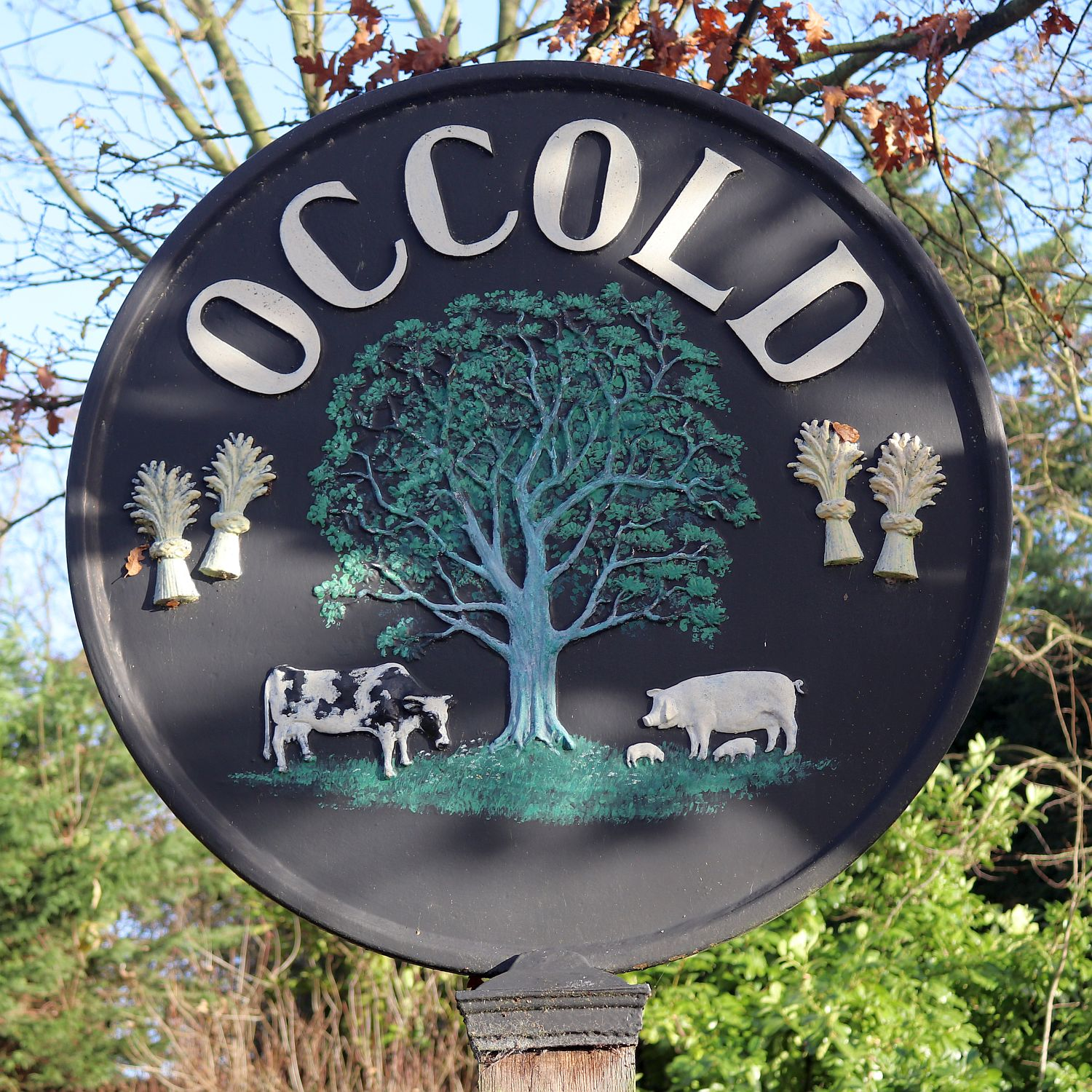
Occold village sign

Occold is a village in Suffolk, England. Occold is located 2 miles south east from the town of Eye, and 8 miles from the town of Diss.

The village has a primary school, at the road junction between The Street, Mill Road and Bullshall Road in the centre of the village, a local public house, The Beaconsfield Arms, Jubilee Baptist Church and St. Michael's Church, Church of England on The Street.

== History ==
In 1850 Elizabeth Burgwin was born here. She went on to create free school meals in London.
