= Stuston =

Village in Suffolk, England

Coordinates: 52.355°N 1.132°E

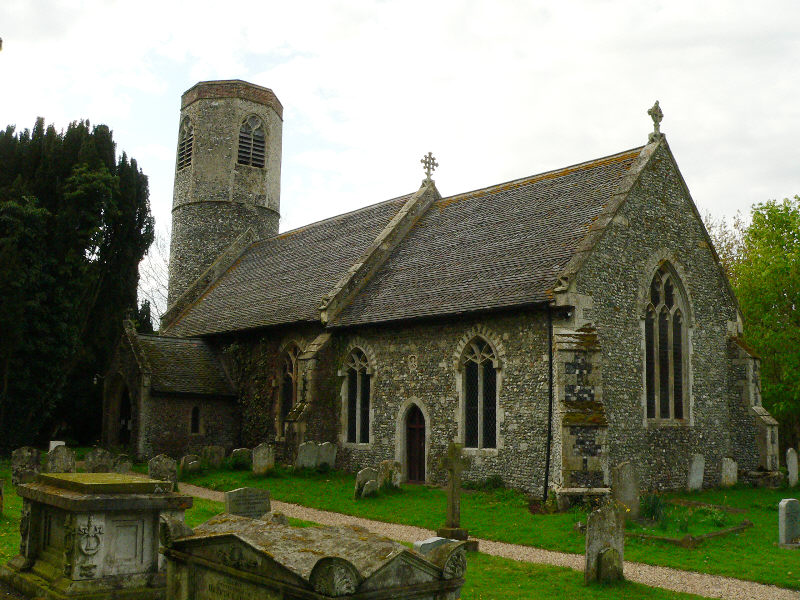
- Stuston All Saints

- Location within Suffolk
- Population: 194 (2011)
- District: Mid Suffolk
- Shire county: Suffolk
- Region: East
- Country: England
- Sovereign state: United Kingdom
- Post town: DISS
- Postcode district: IP21

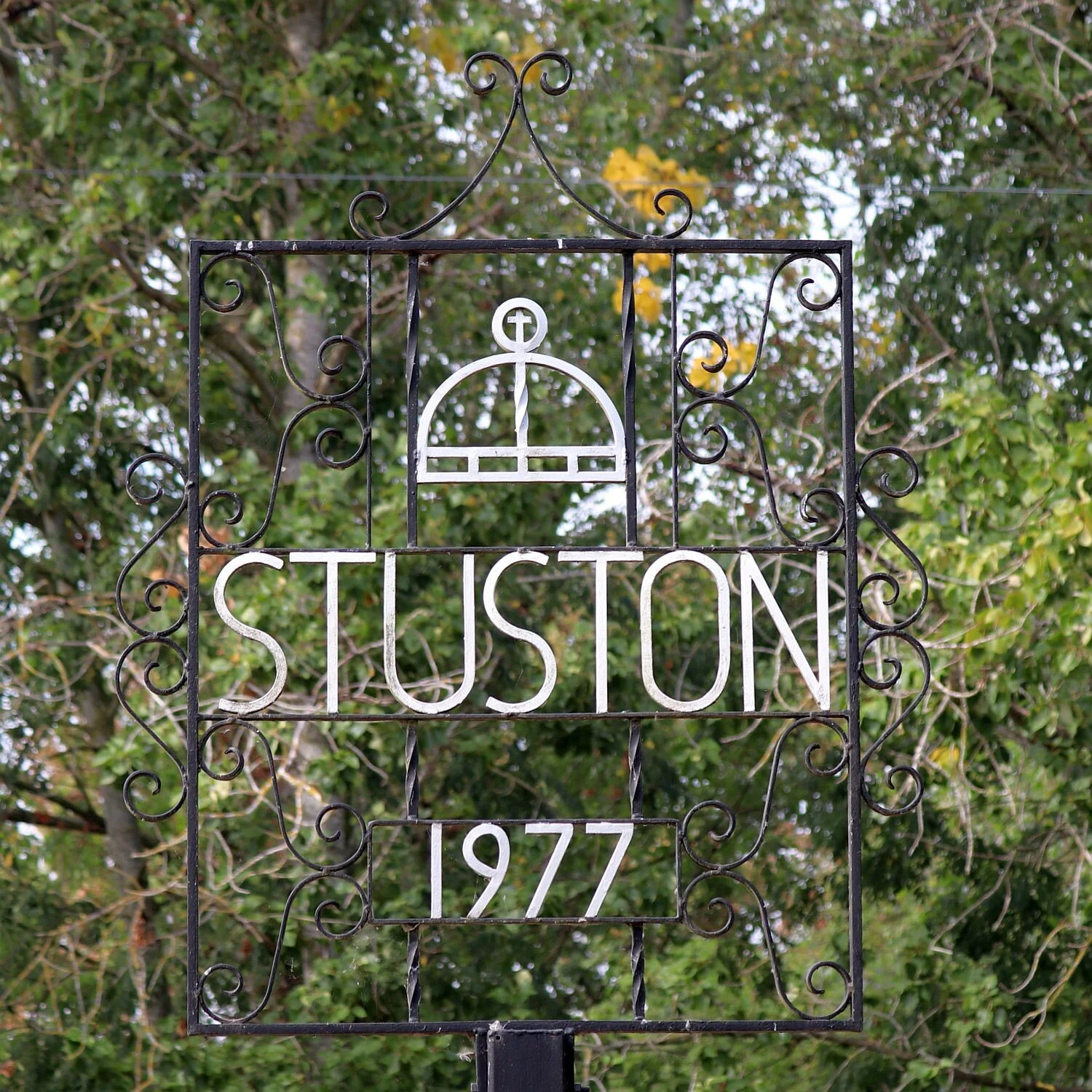
Stuston Village Sign

Stuston is a small village and civil parish in the Mid-Suffolk district of the county of Suffolk, England close to the border with Norfolk, England. Its postal town is Diss, Norfolk, England.

Stuston falls under the authority of Mid Suffolk District Council for local services and Suffolk County Council for larger and more expensive services. It also has a Parish Council.

== Church ==
The mediaeval church of All Saints was restored in 1877 and is a grade II* listed building. It is one of 38 existing round-tower churches in Suffolk.
