= Wyverstone =

Village in Suffolk, England

Coordinates: 52.270°N 0.992°E

- Location within Suffolk
- Population: 370
- OS grid reference: TM0467
- District: Mid Suffolk
- Shire county: Suffolk
- Region: East
- Country: England
- Sovereign state: United Kingdom
- Post town: Stowmarket
- Postcode district: IP14
- Dialling code: 01449
- Police: Suffolk
- Fire: Suffolk
- Ambulance: East of England
- UK Parliament: Waveney Valley

Wyverstone is a village and civil parish in the Mid Suffolk district of Suffolk in eastern England. Located around five miles north of Stowmarket, in 2005 its population was 370. The parish also includes the hamlets of Wyverstone Street, 1 km to the west and Earl's Green, 1.5 km south-west.

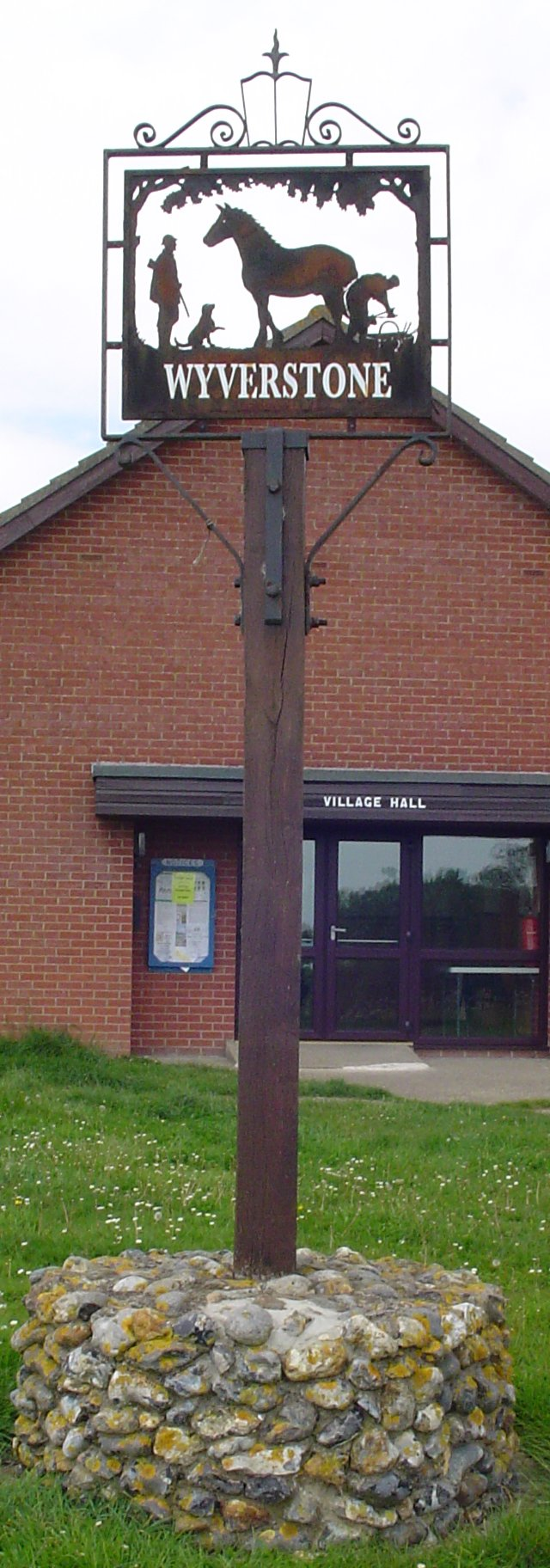
Village sign in Wyverstone

It was recorded in the Domesday Book of 1086 as "Wiuert(h)estuna" and on John Speed’s 1610 map as "Wiuerston".

The village sign as shown in the photograph was made by Brian Brookes from Wyverstone.

== History ==
Hall Barn lies on the site of the former Wyverstone Hall.

Horse slaughter site in the village.

== Present day ==
Wyverstone used to have the Plough pub, a mid 16th building on Mill Road, but it closed in the 1960s and is now a Grade II private dwelling.

The local shop and post office closed soon after the pub.

St George's church is to the east of the village.

The Old School House, built in 1869 but closed in 1963, was purchased by the Parish Council to act as the village hall. It was sold in 1988 and is now a private house, close to the church.

The new village hall is in the centre of the village built in the late 1980s.

Old Rectory and Wyverstone Green come next going west on Rectory Lane.

21 listed structures in the village.

Wyverstone Street

Grange Farm to the north, and Sudbourne Farm to the south and Crooksell Hall in between on Wyverstone Street. There is a fine example of a Grade II listed Tudor public building which has been restored as part of the conversion of barns adjacent to Lodge Farm into a residential home named Guildhall Place.

Earl's Green

== Famous People ==
- Bill Edrich - cricketer
- Wally Sykes - Clay Pigeon Shooting at 1984 Olympics
