= Yaxley, Suffolk =

Village in Suffolk, England

Coordinates: 52.32219°N 1.11082°E

Yaxley
- Location within Suffolk
- Population: 588 (2011)
- OS grid reference: TM121739
- District: Mid Suffolk
- Shire county: Suffolk
- Region: East
- Country: England
- Sovereign state: United Kingdom
- Post town: EYE
- Postcode district: IP23
- Dialling code: 01379
- Police: Suffolk
- Fire: Suffolk
- Ambulance: East of England
- UK Parliament: Central Suffolk and North Ipswich

Yaxley is a small village just west of Eye in Suffolk, England. The name means 'cuckoo-clearing'.

== Church of St. Mary ==
Pevsner describes the north porch of the 12th-century church as 'one of the most swagger in Suffolk'.

Inside the church are the remnants of a large medieval doom painting and high on the wall above the door hangs a Sexton's Wheel. This comprises two wheels, set on a axle. Its purpose, and mode of use, are uncertain. It has been suggested it was simply a decorative feature. An alternative theory suggests it was an early version of the type of spin indicator used in modern gameshows. The sexton would set the wheels spinning and parishioners would grab at one of the strings attached to them. Each string was assigned to one of the six Lady Days named in honour of the Virgin Mary, and whichever string was seized would determine the day on which the parishioner's penitential fast would begin. The only other known example is at Long Stratton in Norfolk.

== Local houses ==
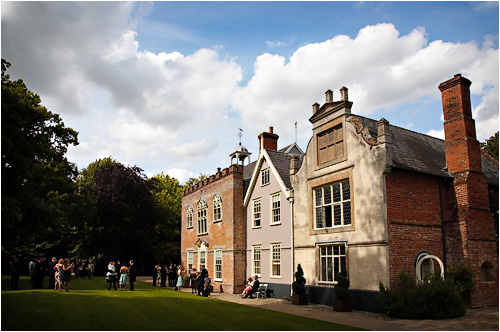
16th-century Yaxley Hall

Ashton Cottage in Church Lane, once the village school, was for many years the home of choreographer Frederick Ashton. He lived in Valley Farm House on Old Ipswich Road, until recently a property of the Henniker-Major family.

16th-century Yaxley Hall is a Grade II* listed building. It has a fanciful Gothic facade and, according to Pevsner, 'a composite picture' including older range with mullioned and transomed windows. Two wings burnt down in 1922. A painting of Henrietta Nelson at the hall is said to be haunted, and has recently been returned to display after an absence of nearly a century.

Yaxley Manor, built for John Fanner in 1520, is of timber frame construction, clad in brickwork. It is a Grade II* listed building.

Bull's Hall is named after William de Bulle, owner in 1328; the present timber-framed and jettied building dates from 1570.
