= Gislingham =

Village in Suffolk, England

Coordinates: 52°18′N 1°03′E

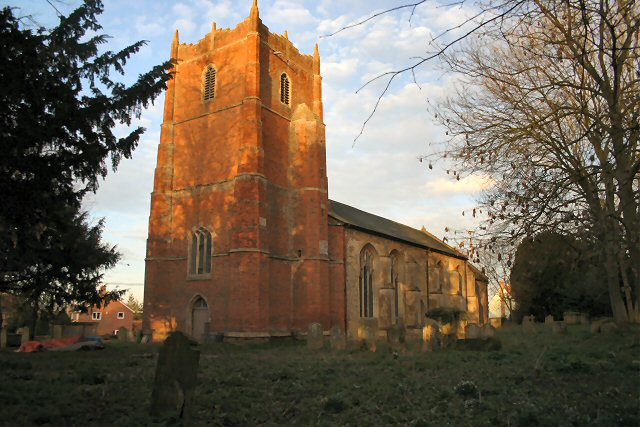
- Church of St Mary
- Area: 3.552 sq mi (9.20 km^{2})
- Population: 1,040 (2011 Census)
  - Density: 293/sq mi (113/km^{2})
- District: Mid Suffolk
- Shire county: Suffolk
- Region: East
- Country: England
- Sovereign state: United Kingdom
- Post town: Eye
- Postcode district: IP23

Gislingham is a village and civil parish in the Mid Suffolk district of Suffolk in eastern England.

== History ==
Gislingham is situated around the area of Stowmarket, Eye and Diss and dates from at least the 9th century. It is in the northern part of Suffolk. The village was well established by the time of the Domesday Book.

From about 1150 to 1312, the Knights Templar were prominent in the village. The earliest parts of St. Mary's Church date from the 1420s.

The village and the surrounding area, like much of East Anglia, was not immune to the Puritan sentiment that ran its course through the 17th century. As such it had connections to conformists and non-conformists alike who departed for the Massachusetts Bay Colony as part of the wave of emigration that occurred during the Great Migration. One notable emigrant who had family ties to the village was Governor Simon Bradstreet. The Puritan supporters of Oliver Cromwell destroyed the highly decorative stained glass windows of St. Mary's in the 1640s.

== Gislingham today ==
The village has its own Outstanding primary school, shop, village hall and park. The population of the village was in steady decline from about 1844 to 1960 (669 to 300 citizens) but has rebounded since.

== Notable people ==
Professional footballer Stuart O'Keefe is from Gislingham
