= Stoke Ash =

Village and civil parish in Suffolk, England

Coordinates: 52.289°N 1.103°E

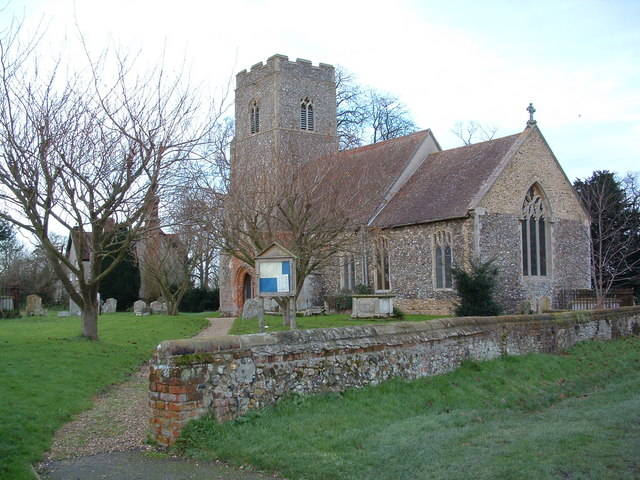
- All Saints Church, Stoke Ash

- Location within Suffolk
- Population: 314 (2011)
- District: Mid Suffolk
- Shire county: Suffolk
- Region: East
- Country: England
- Sovereign state: United Kingdom
- Post town: Eye
- Postcode district: IP23
- Police: Suffolk
- Fire: Suffolk
- Ambulance: East of England

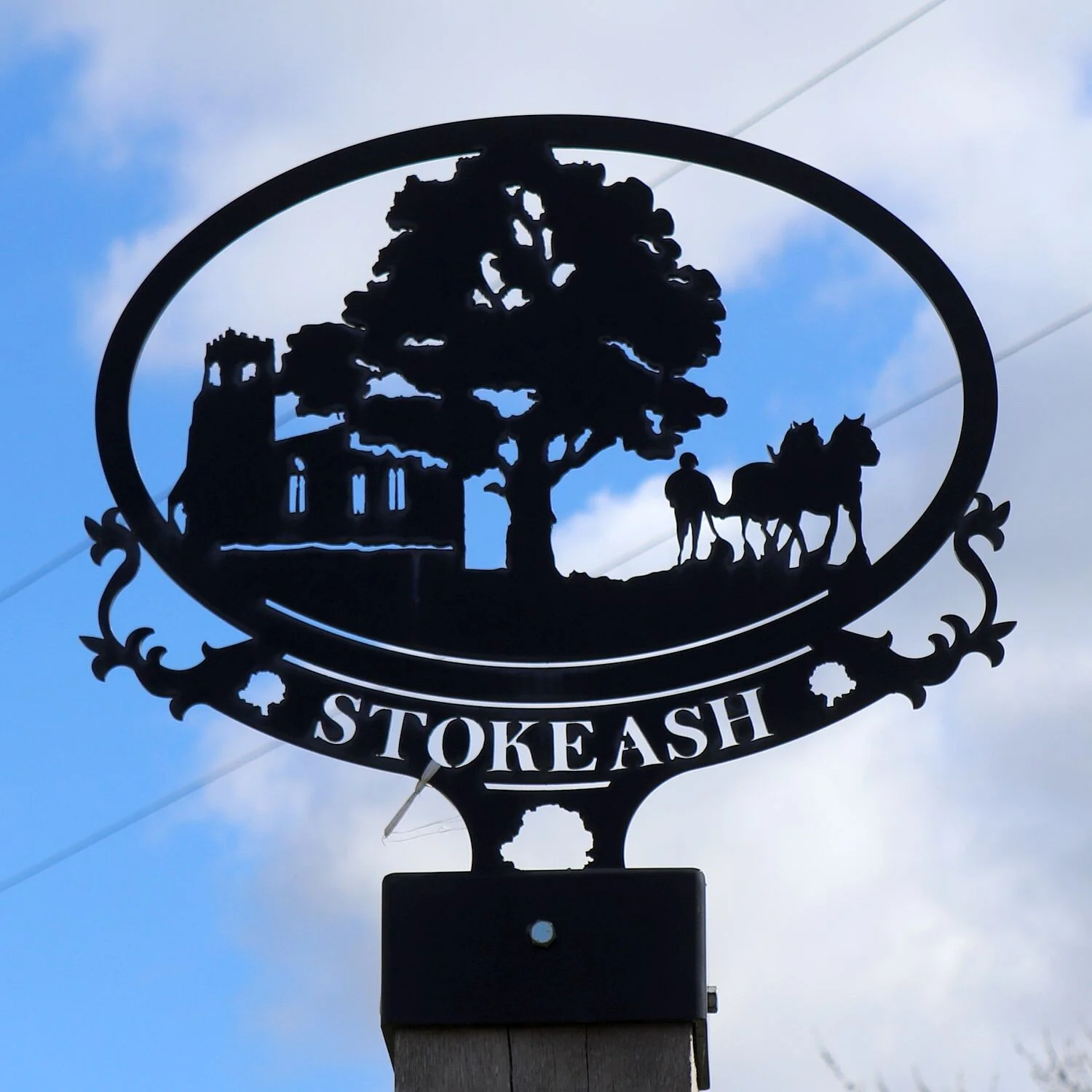
Stoke Ash Village Sign

Stoke Ash is a village and civil parish in the Mid Suffolk district of Suffolk in eastern England. Located around six miles south of Diss, the village had a population of 314 in 2011. The village shares a parish council with the neighbouring village of Thwaite.

Stoke Ash is located on the A140 road, which runs between Norwich and Ipswich.

The name "Stoke" is derived from the Old English word "stoc," meaning a place or secondary settlement. "Ash" comes from the Anglian word "æsc," meaning ash tree. The name "Ash" was added to "Stoke" in the 16th century.

In 1086, Stoke Ash was recorded as "Stoches Stotas" in the Domesday Book.

== Early history ==
There is evidence of a Roman settlement in Stoke Ash. A collection of Roman coins and pottery pieces has been found in the area. A small Roman site is located on the "Colchester to Caistor Roman road." Roman tiles are embedded in the wall of the tower above the doorway in All Saints Church. Some military items and pieces of overseas household artifacts have also been discovered.

== History ==
In 1801, the population of Stoke Ash was categorized into "those chiefly employed in agriculture, those chiefly employed in trade, manufacturing, or handicrafts, and others."

By 1831, 56 percent of the population were classified as labourers and servants, 20 percent as middle class, and 15 percent as employers and professionals. Only 2 percent were categorized as 'other'.

Kelly's Directory of Suffolk (1900) described the soil as mixed, consisting of subsoil and clay. The main crops grown were wheat, barley, and beans. The area was said to cover 1,200 acres.

The Parish School, which included both boys and girls, had 50 enrolled students, with an average attendance of 47.

A pie chart from the period shows the social status of men above the age of 20 in 1831. The "middle sorts" comprised farmers who did not employ labourers, along with masters and skilled workers in urban manufacturing and handicrafts.

== Present day ==
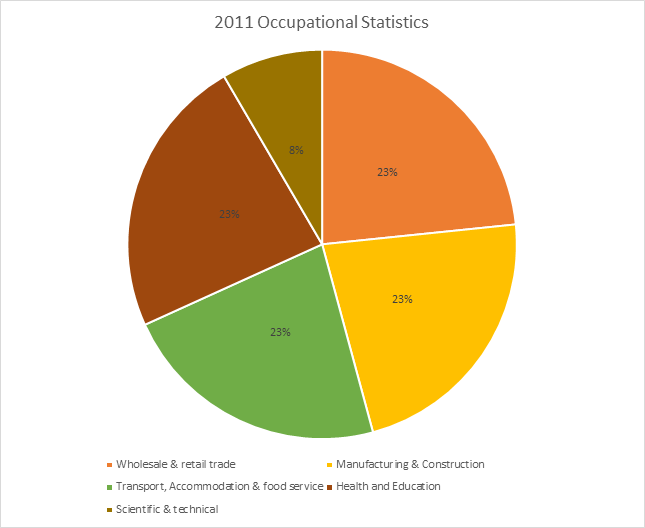
2011 employment statistics

The village of Stoke Ash consists of a church called All Saints, a village hall and green, a post office, a public house, and a boarding kennels and cattery named Quiet Acres. The A140 road divides the village in two. To the east of the A140 are most of the houses, the church, village hall, and post office, making this the main part of the village. The Baptist church and six additional homes are located to the north of the village. The primary school and the White Horse Inn are located on the west side of the A140.

The average population of Stoke Ash is older than both the national UK average and that of Suffolk. According to the UK 2011 Census, Stoke Ash has a low immigrant population, with a lower percentage of inhabitants born in other EU countries or outside the EU compared to the national average. It has a higher proportion of residents born in the UK than the national average.

The number of residents who reported their health as 'very good' in the 2011 UK Census was higher than the national average, while the number who reported their health as 'very bad' was lower than the national average. Stoke Ash also has a higher rate of home ownership, either outright or with a mortgage, compared to the national average.

== All Saints Church ==
The church of All Saints is visible across a field to the east of the A140. The bell openings of the 14th-century tower feature decorated tracery, while there is a later west window and a substantial stair turret rising on the south side. Flint pebbles are laid in courses on the north wall, and the round arches of the low, blocked nave door and priest's door in the chancel indicate that the church was originally built during the Norman period.

The three-light nave window has decorated tracery, with a design of four petals within a circle and mouchettes on either side. The east window is a 19th-century replacement, and there are tall, thin perpendicular windows on the south side. Flushwork diamond crosses are worked into two nave buttresses and may be consecration crosses, though their high placement is unusual. The late 15th-century brick porch has a niche above the outer arch, and there is a vestigial stoop by the inner door. The windows, in decorated style, were inserted when Richard Phipson carried out a major restoration in 1868. The Norman inner doorway is plain, standing 6 feet high and 3 feet 6 inches wide. Phipson also stripped out the plaster ceilings to reveal a scissor-braced roof, with heavier arch braces in the chancel extending well down the walls. The benches were designed by Phipson, and the stools in the chancel incorporate fine medieval poppyheads.

The tower arch is tall and narrow, and at its base stands the crown of a medieval bell, cast by the earliest known foundry in Bury St Edmunds between 1460 and 1480. The inscription on the bell reads "Credo in Deum Patrem Omni Potentem," which translates from Latin as "I believe in God, the Father Almighty." Over the south door hangs a dark set of Hanoverian royal arms, relabeled for William IV in 1836. They are painted on wooden boards and have a pedimented top. There is no longer a chancel arch or screen, but the stairs leading to the rood loft rise within the window embrasure on both sides. The early 17th-century pulpit nearby has blind arches in the panels and bird-beak motifs in the scrollwork, though the lower panels have been renewed. The small priest’s door is set within a much larger, later pointed arch, and in the north wall of the sanctuary, there is a large, plain recess. Its depth suggests it may have been an aumbry, though the chamfered edges indicate it likely did not have a door.

The decalogue is painted on a 19th-century zinc plate on the east wall, alongside the piscina, which lacks its drain. In the adjacent window, there are fragments of 15th-century glass, including depictions of a single hand and a book.

The register dates back to the year 1550.

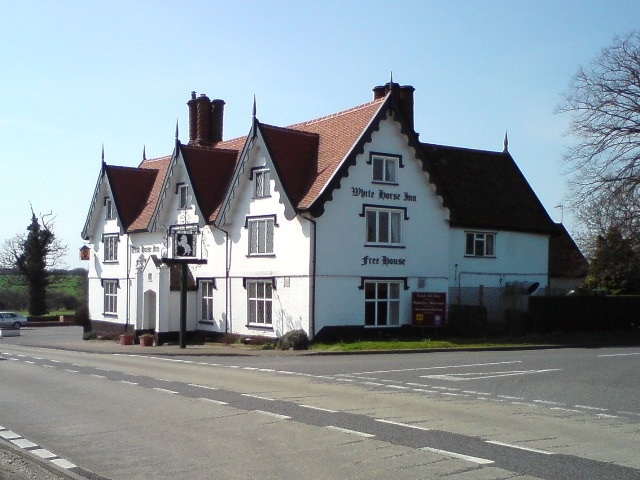
The White Horse Inn

== The White Horse Inn ==
The White Horse Inn is a bed and breakfast located on the A140, near the town of Eye in Suffolk, midway between Ipswich and Norwich. It dates back to the 17th century, when it was a coaching inn. The inn was built during the reign of Charles I of England. It also serves lunches and dinners.
