= Finningham =

Village in Suffolk, England

Coordinates: 52.28336°N 1.02991°E

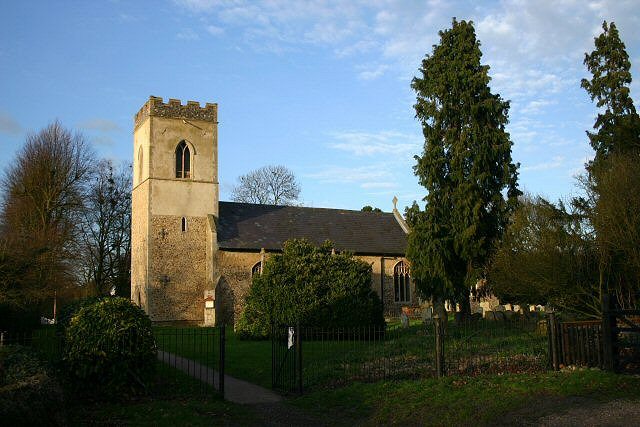
- Church of St. Bartholomew, Finningham

- Location within Suffolk
- Population: 480 (2005); 480 (2011)
- District: Mid Suffolk
- Shire county: Suffolk
- Region: East
- Country: England
- Sovereign state: United Kingdom
- Post town: Stowmarket
- Postcode district: IP14
- Police: Suffolk
- Fire: Suffolk
- Ambulance: East of England

Finningham is a village and civil parish in the Mid Suffolk district of Suffolk in the East of England, located approximately 7.5 miles north of Stowmarket and 16 miles from the county town of Ipswich. In 2011 its population was 480.

== Etymology ==
Finningham's name is a union of three words: Finn; ing; and ham. Finningham is a hamlet or encampment (ham) of the people (ing) of Finn or Finna. The surname Finn is German, derived from an ethnic name referring to people from Finland. The area was populated by the Angles - one of the main Germanic people who settled after the Romans.

== History ==
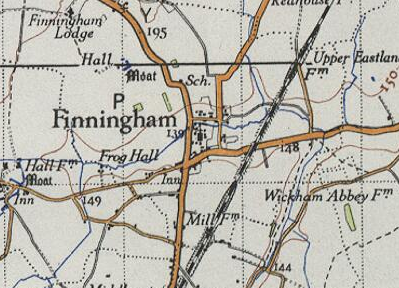
20th century map of Finningham, Suffolk

In the 1870s, Finningham was described as

"a village and a parish in Hartismere district, Suffolk. The village stands adjacent to the Eastern Union railway, 6¼ miles SW of Eye; and has a station on the railway, a post office under Stowmarket, and a fair on 4 Sept."

Finningham railway station opened in 1848 for goods traffic and in 1849 for passengers. Located in the neighbouring parish of Bacton, Suffolk on the Great Eastern Main Line, the station provided a train link to London and Norwich. The station was closed in 1966 as part of the Beeching Axe, although the line remains open and runs over the nearby Wickham Road.

The monk and author Robert de Finingham, who died in 1460, was born and educated in Finningham.

== Church of St. Bartholomew ==
Built in 1560, the Church of St. Bartholomew has north and south porches, a chancel, and a west tower. The west tower is the most prominent feature of the Church, as it is the tallest and the oldest, with no buttresses to support it. 'The opening above the nave roof to the east consists of a quatrefoil in a circle and this seems likely to be original since there are no traces of any earlier openings here'.

In 1999, a memorial was installed in the church to commemorate the powers of observation and recording shown in historian John Frere’s publication of Stone Age artefacts found near Hoxne in the late 1700s. Frere’s excavations and discoveries have resulted in this area of Mid Suffolk being considered one of the most important middle Pleistocene sites in Europe.

John Marius Wilson described the church as "ancient but good; and has a fine font, and monuments of the Freres and the Fenns. There are a Wesleyan chapel, and charities £26."

== Geography ==
Finningham sits in a slight valley either side of a tributary of the River Dove that flows north-eastwards via Eye to join the River Waveney at the Norfolk border. The village is situated on the 'High Suffolk' claylands, deposited on the Ice Ages over the chalk that underlies most of the county. This makes the area good for arable farming, because the clay binds the soil together and makes it less prone to erosion.

== Demographics ==
=== Population ===
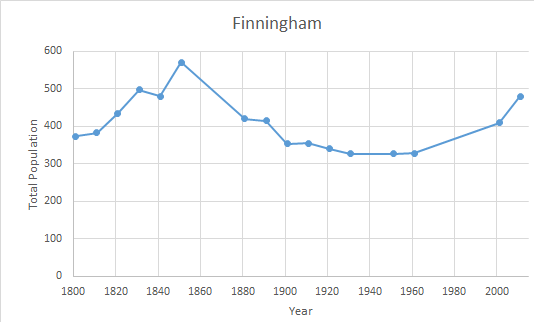
Total population of Finningham, Suffolk (1801-2011)

According to the 2011 Census there were 239 males and 241 females living in the parish. Over the years, Finningham's population has changed, reaching its peak in 1851 with 571. Population fell between 1911 and 1921, possibly due to World War I. In 1931, there were 175 males and 152 females in Finningham, but 20 years later, the population of females grew by 17 whereas the population of males fell by 17, most likely due to World War Two and its aftermath.

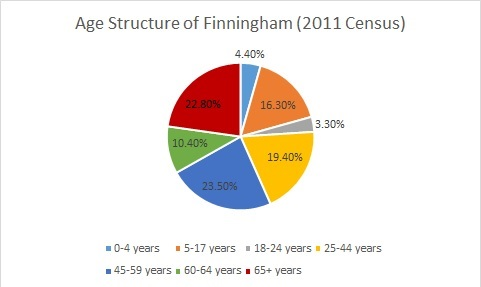
Age structure of Finningham, Suffolk (2011 Census)

=== Age Structure ===
The mean age in Finningham was 44.9 years (2011 Census) – compared to the national average of 39.3 years. This could be because of the higher proportion of elderly people (22.8% were over 65 years old) who may have retired and live in rural villages such as Finningham.

=== Occupational Structure ===
Occupational structure of Finningham, Suffolk (2011)

Agriculture was a major industry in Suffolk, partly due to the geography of the area. In 1881, 83 people were employed by the agricultural industry - more than any other in Finningham. 81 of them were men, as women at the time spent more time doing domestic work due to social attitudes and status at the time.

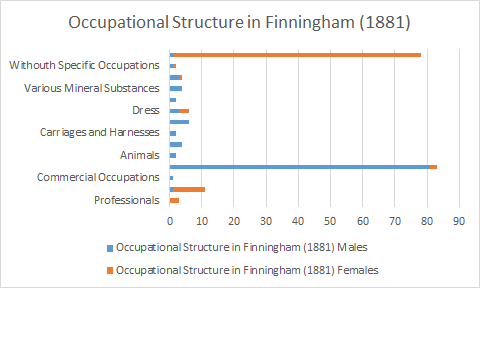
Occupational structure of Finningham, Suffolk (1881)

The occupational structure of Finningham has diversified. in 1881, 73% of men worked in the agricultural industry so there was a reliance, but in 2011 there appears to be a range of secondary and tertiary industries. This is reflective of the UK's economic change throughout the 1800s, 1900s and the present day. In 1881, there were a majority of women working in 'Personal Service', 'Clothing', and 'Textiles', yet in 2011 more women work in the tertiary sector.

The changed social attitudes is reflected by the occupational structure in 2011. Whilst men dominate ‘skilled trades’ (labour jobs that require specific training such as a carpenter or electrician), more women work in ‘professional occupations’ than men. The fact that more women in Finningham work in the tertiary sector highlights the difference in the role of women in society between 1881 and 2011. 77 women had an ‘unknown occupation’ in 1881, whereas only 0.6% are unemployed or have never worked in 2011. 'In the 1970s and continuing into the 1980s and 1990s, it became increasingly difficult to find women to hoe, weed, pick stones, and the like, work which on the whole was neither skilled nor unduly heavy'. This, combined with increasing mechanisation and changing patterns of land use meant that the demand for such jobs declined, so women had to find work in the manufacturing and tertiary sectors.

=== Religion ===
Religion in Finningham (2011 census)
Christianity	71.7%
No religion	19%
Not stated	9.3%

Christianity is the most followed religion in Finningham, shown by the presence of the Church of St. Bartholomew.

Church attendance has fallen during Christmas and Easter from 2006 to 2012. This could be reflected from the 2001 census, when 81% followed Christianity and 10% had 'no religion', compared to the 19% in 2011.

== Transport ==
The closure of Finningham railway station in 1966 meant that the nearest railway station is located 7.5 miles south in Stowmarket on the Great Eastern Main Line, providing links to Ipswich and London.

The A140 - the main road link between Ipswich and Norfolk - is located 3.6 miles from Finningham, and can be accessed via Wickham Road, or by the A143 to the north.
