= Mid Suffolk =

Coordinates: 52.1560°N 1.0489°E

Mid Suffolk District
- Non-metropolitan district
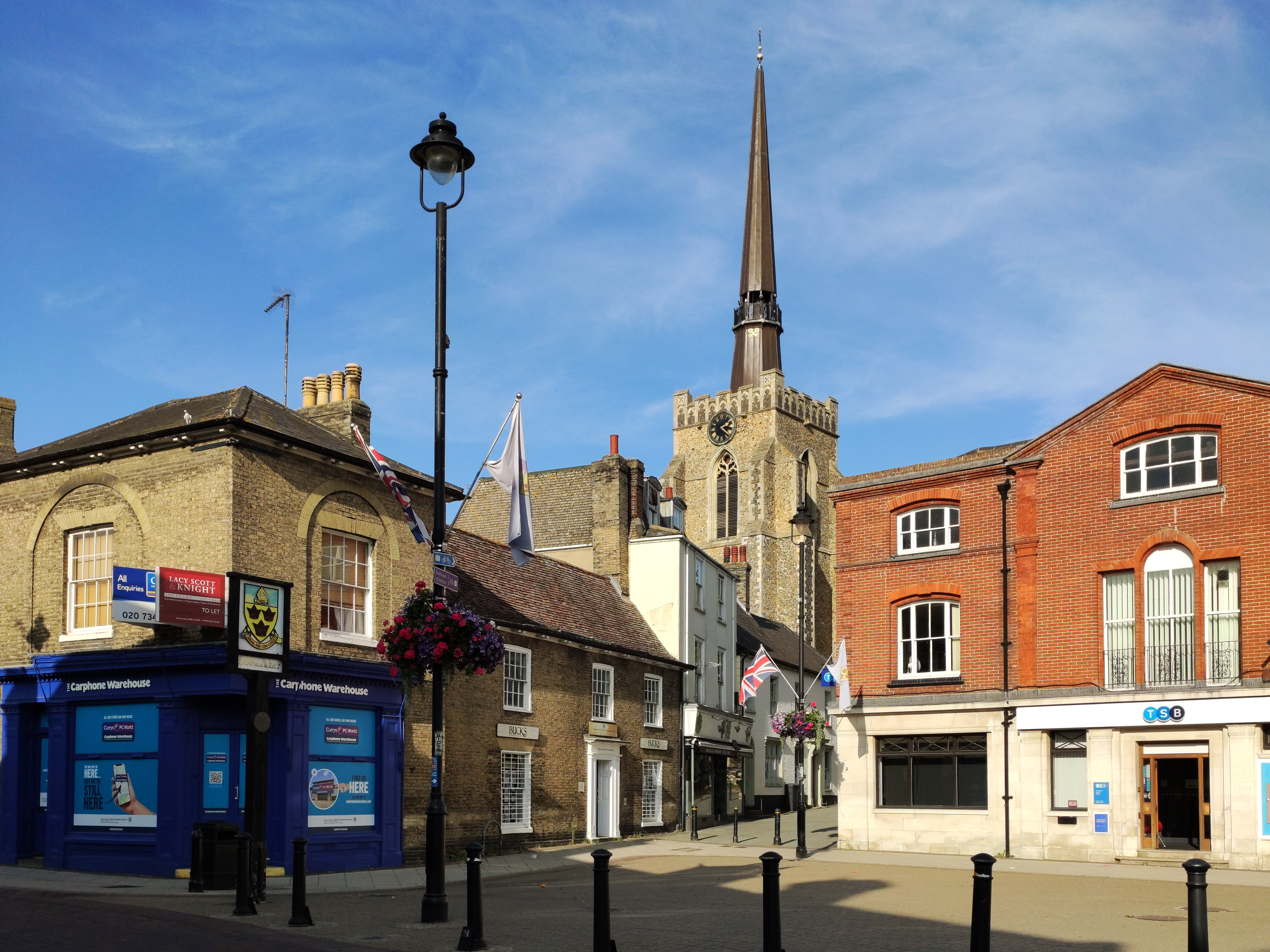
- Stowmarket, the district's largest town

- Mid Suffolk shown within Suffolk and England
- Sovereign state: United Kingdom
- Constituent country: England
- Region: East of England
- Non-metropolitan county: Suffolk
- Status: Non-metropolitan district
- Admin HQ: Ipswich
- Incorporated: 1 April 1974

Government
  - Type: Non-metropolitan district council
  - Body: Mid Suffolk District Council
  - MPs: Peter Prinsley (Lab); Adrian Ramsay (Green); Patrick Spencer (Ind)

Area
  - Total: 336.3 sq mi (871.1 km^{2})
  - Rank: 37th (of 296)

Population (2024)
  - Total: 110,775
  - Rank: 224th (of 296)
  - Density: 329.4/sq mi (127.2/km^{2})

Ethnicity (2021)
  - Ethnic groups: List: 96.8% White; 1.4% Mixed; 0.8% Asian; 0.5% Black; 0.4% other

Religion (2021)
  - Religion: List: 49.3% Christianity; 43.5% no religion; 7% other; 0.2% Islam
- Time zone: UTC0 (GMT)
  - Summer (DST): UTC+1 (BST)
- ONS code: 42UE (ONS); E07000203 (GSS)
- OS grid reference: TM0853555286

Mid Suffolk is a local government district in Suffolk, England. The district is primarily a rural area, containing just three towns, being Stowmarket, Needham Market and Eye. Its council was based in Needham Market until 2017 when it moved to shared offices with neighbouring Babergh District Council in Ipswich, outside either district. In 2021 it had a population of 103,417.

The neighbouring districts are East Suffolk, Ipswich, Babergh, West Suffolk, Breckland and South Norfolk.

== History ==
The district was created on 1 April 1974 under the Local Government Act 1972, covering five former districts which were all abolished at the same time:

- Eye Municipal Borough
- Gipping Rural District
- Hartismere Rural District
- Stowmarket Urban District
- Thedwastre Rural District

Thedwastre Rural District had been in the administrative county of West Suffolk prior to the reforms; the other districts had all been in East Suffolk. The new district was named Mid Suffolk, reflecting its position within the wider county.

In March 2026, the government announced plans to abolish the district in 2028 as part of local government reorganisation across Suffolk. These proposals were withdrawn in September 2026.

== Governance ==
Mid Suffolk District Council

Type
- Type: Non-metropolitan district

Leadership
- Chair: Lorraine Baker, Green since 14 May 2026
- Leader: Andy Mellen, Green since 22 May 2023
- Chief Executive: Arthur Charvonia since 2017

Structure
- Seats: 34 councillors
- Political groups: Administration (23) Green (23) Other parties (11) Liberal Democrats (4) Conservative (3) Independent (4)

Elections
- Voting system: First past the post
- Last election: 4 May 2023
- Next election: 6 May 2027

Meeting place
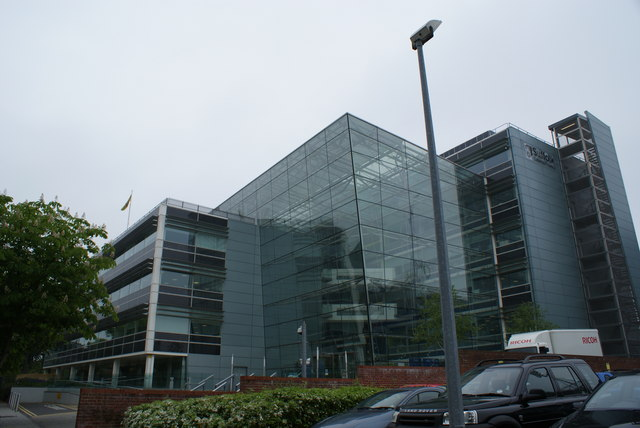
- Endeavour House, 8 Russell Road, Ipswich, IP1 2BX

Website
- www.midsuffolk.gov.uk

Mid Suffolk District Council provides district-level services. County-level services are provided by Suffolk County Council. The whole district is also covered by civil parishes, which form a third tier of local government.

In 2011, Mid Suffolk and Babergh District Councils began working together, with one, fully integrated staff structure.

=== Political control ===
The council has been under Green Party majority control since the 2023 election, being the first time that the party had taken majority control of any council.

The first elections were held in 1973, initially operating as a shadow authority alongside the outgoing authorities until the new arrangements came into effect on 1 April 1974. Political control of the council since 1974 has been as follows:

Party in control	Years
Independent	1974–1976
No overall control	1976–2003
Conservative	2003–2005
No overall control	2005–2007
Conservative	2007–2019
No overall control	2019–2023
Green	2023–present

=== Leadership ===
The leaders of the council since 2003 have been:

Councillor	Party	From	To
Penny Otton	Liberal Democrats		May 2003
Roger Saunders	Conservative	May 2003	Aug 2005
Tim Passmore	Conservative	Aug 2005	Nov 2012
Derrick Haley	Conservative	Dec 2012	28 Apr 2016
Nick Gowrley	Conservative	28 Apr 2016	May 2019
Suzie Morley	Conservative	20 May 2019	May 2023
Andy Mellen	Green	22 May 2023	

=== Composition ===
Following the 2023 election, and subsequent by-elections and changes of allegiance up to May 2025, the composition of the council was:

Party	Councillors
Green	23
Liberal Democrats	4
Conservative	3
Independent	4
Total	34

The four independent councillors sit together as the "Mid Suffolk Independents" group. The next election is due in May 2027, where all seats of the council will be up for election.

=== Elections ===
Since the last boundary changes in 2019 the council has comprised 34 councillors representing 26 wards, with each ward electing one or two councillors. Elections are held every four years.

=== Premises ===
Since 2017 Babergh and Mid Suffolk councils have their combined headquarters at Endeavour House in Ipswich, sharing the building with Suffolk County Council.

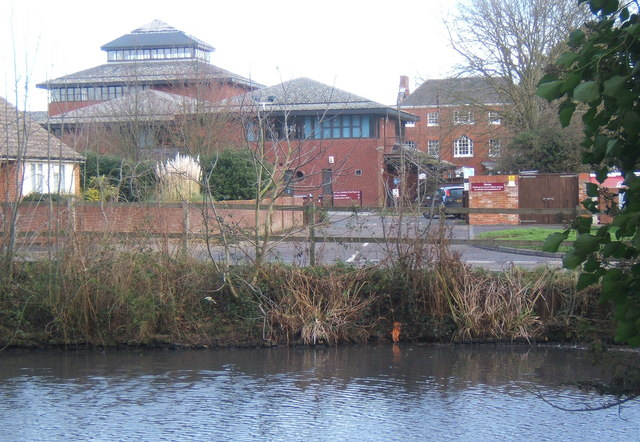
Council Offices, High Street, Needham Market: Council's headquarters 1982–2017

When first created the council inherited offices in Elmswell, Eye, Stowmarket and Needham Market from its predecessors. It initially used the former Hartismere Rural District Council offices on Castleton Way in Eye as its headquarters, retaining the former Gipping Rural District Council offices in Needham Market and Stowmarket Urban District Council offices at Red Gables on Ipswich Road as secondary offices.

The council initially decided to consolidate its offices in Stowmarket, being the district's largest town and a central location, but no suitable site could be found there. Instead it decided to extend the former Gipping Rural District Council's headquarters in Needham Market. The original building there was a large eighteenth century house called "Hurstlea" at 131 High Street. A large modern extension was built behind the original building, which was formally opened in January 1982.

== Towns and parishes ==
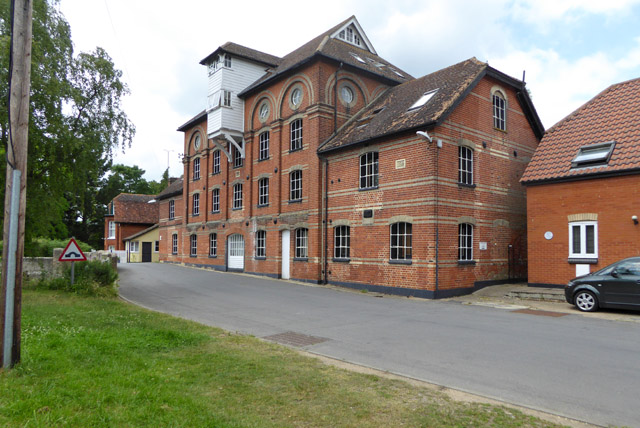
Hawks Mill at Needham Market

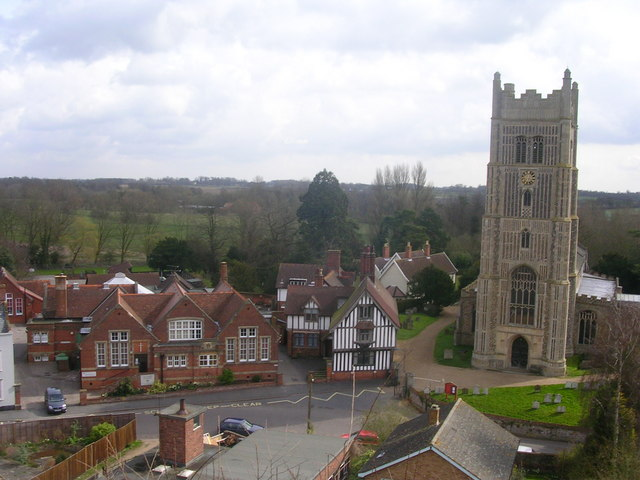
Church and Guildhall at Eye

The whole district is covered by civil parishes. The parish councils for Eye, Needham Market and Stowmarket have declared their parishes to be towns, allowing them to take the style "town council". Some of the smaller parishes have a parish meeting rather than a parish council.
