= Walter Arthur Copinger =

English jurist and author (1847–1910)

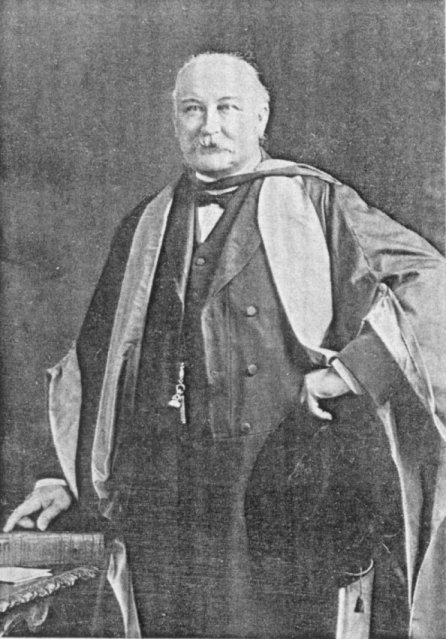
- Born: 14 April 1847
- Died: 13 March 1910
- Occupations: Professor; bibliographer; writer; conveyancer; barrister

Walter Arthur Copinger FSA FRSA (14 April 1847 – 13 March 1910) was an English professor of law, antiquary and bibliographer.

== Early life and education ==
Copinger was born on 14 April 1847 at Clapham, the second son of Charles Louis George Emanuel Copinger and his wife Mary, widow of George James, and daughter of Thomas Pearson of Shepperton, Surrey. Educated at the private school of John Andrews at Wellesley House, Brighton, he passed to University College, Durham, but left Durham without completing his course to enter the office of a relative who was a solicitor in London. He did not remain there long. In 1866, he was admitted a student of the Middle Temple, and after spending a short time in the chambers of T. Bourdillon, a well-known conveyancing counsel, he was called to the bar on 26 January 1869. He had mastered the principal treatises of law, and especially the law of real property.

== Career ==
In 1870 Copinger settled in Manchester, and commenced practice as an equity draughtsman and conveyancer, and in the chancery court of the county palatine of Lancaster. His work as a conveyancer increased: he ceased to take court work and became the leading conveyancer out of London, also consulted on questions of copyright. He was a lucid legal thinker with facility in drafting, and a vivid teacher to his pupils. After his call to the bar, Copinger turned his attention to the law of copyright, and in 1870 he published a work on the Law of Copyright in Works of Literature and Art (4th edit. 1904).

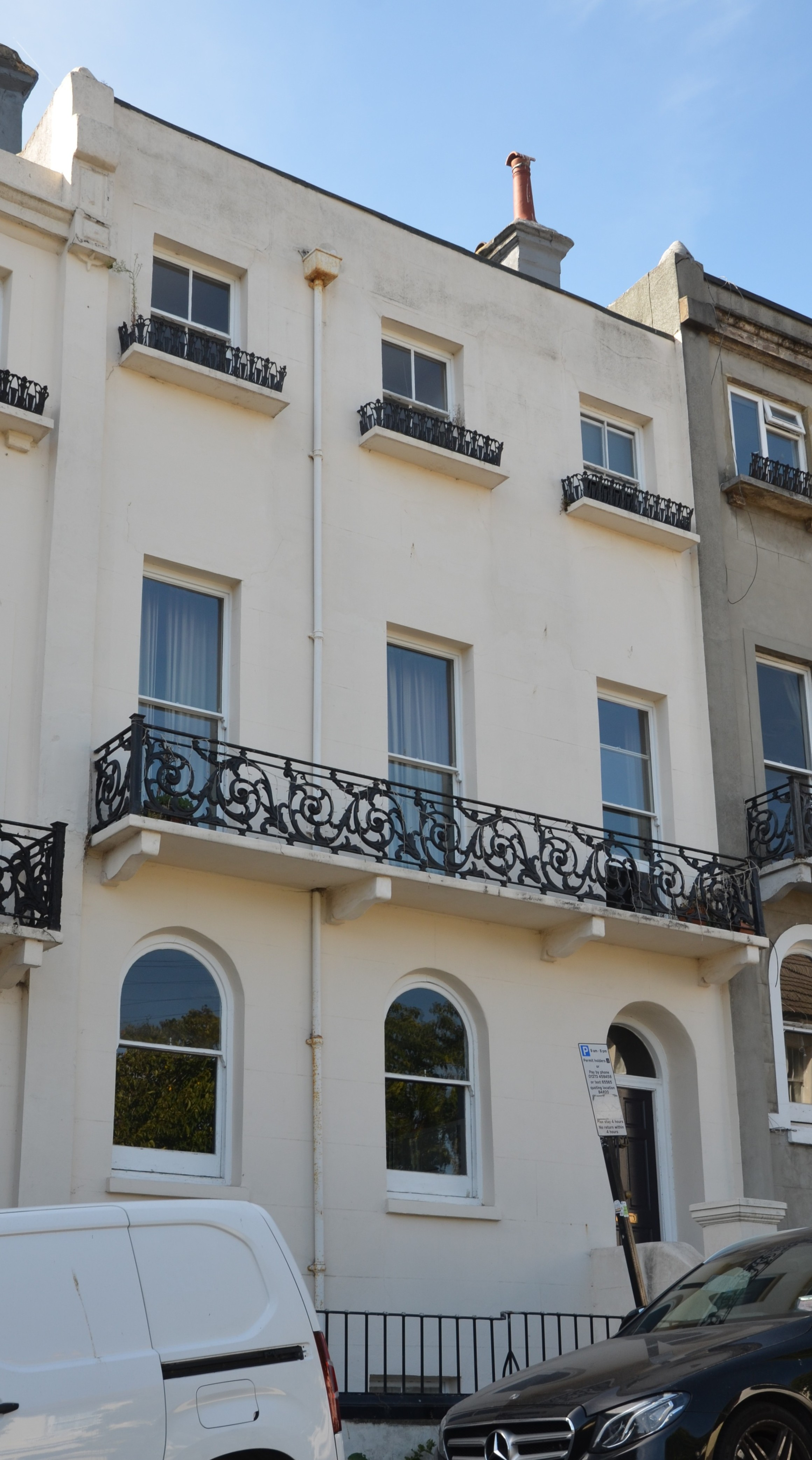
5 Round Hill Crescent, Brighton, Copinger's childhood home.

Copinger continued to write on legal subjects, more particularly on conveyancing. In 1872 appeared an exhaustive Index to Precedents in Conveyancing; and in 1875 Title Deeds, their Custody and Production of other Documentary Evidence at Law and Equity. His Law of Rents with special Reference to the Sale of Land in Consideration of a Rent Charge, which was written many years before, was published in 1886, in collaboration with Professor Munro. In 1876 he published An Essay on the Abolition of Capital Punishment, which, to his amusement, was so enthusiastically received by the abolitionists that his intention to publish another pamphlet demolishing all the arguments in the first was abandoned.

In 1888 Copinger was appointed lecturer in law in Owens College, Manchester, and in 1892, on the resignation of Joseph Edwin Crawford Munro, he became professor of law, and finally dean of the faculty of law in the Victoria University. He received the Lambeth degree of Doctor of Laws from Archbishop Benson in 1889, and that of M.A. from the Victoria University in 1905. He was president of the Manchester Law Society's Library, and of the East Anglians of Manchester and District. Copinger industriously pursued versatile interests. Besides being an expert in old property law, he was also a bibliographer and antiquarian, and took an interest in theology.

=== Bibliographer ===
Largely owing to Copinger's efforts, supported by Richard Copley Christie, the Bibliographical Society was founded in London in 1892; he was the society's first president, and held the post for four years. His own work in the field, however, lacked accuracy.

Between 1895 and 1898 Copinger published his major bibliographical work, the Supplement to Hain's Repertorium bibliographicum. It comprises 7000 corrections of and additions to the collations of fifteenth-century works described or mentioned by Ludwig Hain, and a list of nearly 6000 works not referred to by Hain. This work extends to upwards of 1630 closely printed double-column pages. It must be used with caution.

He contributed papers to the Transactions of the Bibliographical Society, including a monograph on the fifteenth-century printed editions of Virgil. In 1892 he published a folio volume on Incunabula Biblica, a bibliographical account of 124 editions of the Latin Bible printed between 1450 and 1500. At his Manchester residence, The Priory, Greenheys, he set up a small press, at which he printed for private circulation four volumes: 1. Catalogue of the Copinger Collection of Editions of the Latin Bible, 1893. 2. Corrections and Additions to the Catalogue of Incunabula in the Mazarin Library, 1893. 3. Reprint of Leland's New Year's Gift to Henry VIII, 1895. 4. On the Authorship of the First Hundred numbers of the Edinburgh Review, 1895. Nos. 3 and 4 bear the serial title 'Bibliographiana.

=== Antiquary ===
Copinger was interested also in genealogy, heraldry, and manorial history. In 1882 he published his History of the Copingers or Coppingers (new enlarged edit. 1884), in which he traces the descent of his family from the Danes in the tenth century, when they appear to have settled in Suffolk and in the south of Ireland. In his last years he concentrated on the history of Suffolk. In 1902 he issued the History of the Parish of Buxhall, of which he was lord of the manor. Between 1904 and 1907 the History of Suffolk as described by Existing Records (in 5 vols.) made its appearance together with the Manors of Suffolk: Notes on their History and Devolution (7 vols. 1905–11). He also compiled the History of the Smith-Carrington Family (2 vols. 1907), which was severely criticized for its dependence upon inauthentic sources, and wrote Heraldry Simplified, which appeared in the year of his death.

=== Theology ===
In religion Copinger was member of the Catholic Apostolic Church, and for a number of years was the angel of the Catholic Apostolic church in Manchester; later he was angel-evangelist. His interest in theology was broad, and the work which he valued most of his own writings was a lengthy treatise from his pen on Predestination, Election, and Grace (1889). His other theological writings were: Testimony of Antiquity ... being a Reprint of the Homily by Elfric, edited by himself, 1877; Thoughts on Holiness, Doctrinal and Practical, 1883; Contributions to Hymnody, 1886; The Bible and its Transmission, 1897; a new translation of Imitatio Christi, 1900; and William Law's Serious Call adapted to the Requirements of the Present Day, 1905.

== Personal life ==
Copinger played several instruments, including the pianoforte and violin, and found time to compose a number of musical pieces, amongst which is a collection of seventy-five original hymn tunes. This collection, the Contributions to the Hymnody of the Church, was first published in 1883 with thirty-five hymns in 1883 and enlarged to seventy-five hymns in 1885.

An ardent book-collector, he accumulated a considerable library. It was rich in early printed books, Bibles, manuscripts, and printed editions of the Imitatio Christi, hymn books, Elzevirs, and general works of reference.

On 3 September 1873 Copinger married Caroline Agnes, eldest daughter of Thomas Inglis Stewart, vicar of Landscove, Devon. She predeceased him, leaving two sons (including Harold Bernard Copinger) and three daughters. Copinger died at his residence in Manchester on 13 March 1910 from pneumonia following an attack of influenza. He was buried at St James's Birch, Rusholme, Manchester.

== Legacy ==
Copinger's collection of manuscripts is now held by the John Rylands Library, University of Manchester.

=== Works ===
Manors of Suffolk The final volume was compiled by his son, Harold Bernard Copinger (1880 - 1951)

- The Manors of Suffolk; Notes on their History and Devolution, with some illustrations of the Old Manor Houses, Vol. 1, (1905) London: T. Fisher Unwin (Babergh and Blackbourn Hundred)
- The Manors of Suffolk; Notes on their History and Devolution, with some illustrations of the Old Manor Houses, Vol. 2 Manchester: Taylor, Garnett, Evans & co. (Blything and Bosmere and Claydon Hundred)
- The Manors of Suffolk; Notes on their History and Devolution, with some illustrations of the Old Manor Houses, Vol. 3, (1909) Manchester: Taylor, Garnett, Evans & co. (Carlford, Colneis, Cosford and Hartismere Hundred)
- The Manors of Suffolk; Notes on their History and Devolution, with some illustrations of the Old Manor Houses, Vol. 4 (1909) Manchester: Taylor, Garnett, Evans & co. (Hoxne, Lackford and Loes Hundred)
- The Manors of Suffolk; Notes on their History and Devolution, with some illustrations of the Old Manor Houses, Vol. 5, (1905) London: T. Fisher Unwin (Mutford and Lothingland, Plomesgate and Risbridge Hundred)
- The Manors of Suffolk; Notes on their History and Devolution, with some illustrations of the Old Manor Houses, Vol. 6, (1910) Manchester: Taylor, Garnett, Evans & co. (Samford, Colneis, Stow and Thedwastre Hundred)
- The Manors of Suffolk; Notes on their History and Devolution, with some illustrations of the Old Manor Houses, Vol. 7 (1911) Manchester: Taylor, Garnett, Evans & co. (Thingoe, Thredling, Wangford and Wilford Hundred)

Professional and academic associations
| Preceded by Frederick A. Whaite | Treasurer of the Lancashire and Cheshire Antiquarian Society; 1885–89 | Succeeded by Thomas Letherbrow |
