= Suffolk sandlands =

Area of Suffolk, England

The Suffolk sandlands constitute a distinct area of the English county of Suffolk. The eighteenth century topographer John Kirby identified them as lying in the hundreds of Colneis, part of Carlford, Loes, Willford, Plomesgate, Blything and Mutford and Lothingland Hundred. These were all hundreds along the Suffolk Coast which he further sub-divided into marsh, arable and heathland.

The Suffolk Farming Wildlife Advisory Group has established the Sandlands Facilitation Group to encourage a collaborative approach to enhance and increase the habitat, biodiversity and wildlife of the area, in which they include the Shotley Peninsula in the historic hundred of Samford.
