= Suffolk Militia =

Auxiliary military force in Suffolk, England

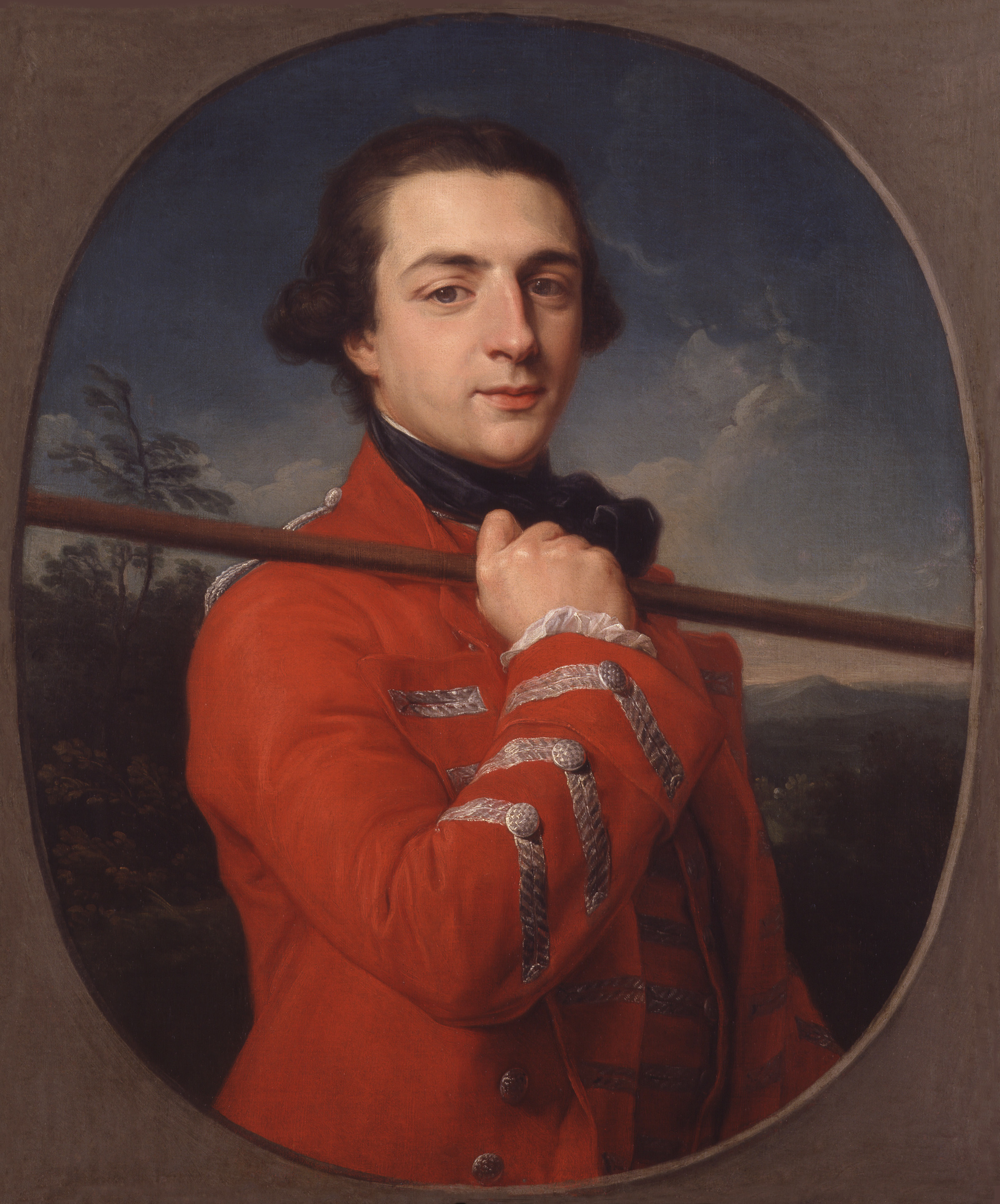
Portrait of the Duke of Grafton by Pompeo Batoni, 1762. Grafton is dressed in the uniform of the Suffolk Militia.

The Suffolk Militia was an auxiliary (Note: It is incorrect to describe the British Militia as 'irregular': throughout their history they were equipped and trained exactly like the line regiments of the regular army, and once embodied in time of war they were fulltime professional soldiers for the duration of their enlistment.) military force in the county of Suffolk on the East Coast of England. (Note: Not to be confused with the 18th century Suffolk County Militia of Long Island, New York) From their formal organisation as Trained bands in 1558 until their final service as the Special Reserve, the Militia regiments of the county served in home defence in all of Britain's major wars, seeing action in the Second Dutch War, serving in Ireland and the Channel Islands, and training thousands of reinforcements during World War I. After a shadowy postwar existence they were formally disbanded in 1953.

== Early history ==
The English militia was descended from the Anglo-Saxon Fyrd, the military force raised from the freemen of the shires under command of their Sheriff. It continued under the Norman and Plantagenet kings and was reorganised under the Assizes of Arms of 1181 and 1252, and again by the Statute of Winchester of 1285. At a muster in 1539 the listed Hundreds of Suffolk produced the following forces: (Note: Not all the Hundreds of Suffolk are represented in the list, nor are the boroughs of Bury St Edmunds, Ipswich or Sudbury.)

- Risbridge: 161 archers, 178 billmen
- Wilford: 58 men in 'harness' (armour), 56 archers, 180 billmen
- Loes: 179 men
- Woodbridge (detached from Loes): 85 men
- Thredling: 141 men
- Cosford: 530 men

Under the Tudors the legal basis of the militia was updated by two acts of 1557 and covering musters (4 & 5 Ph. & M. c. 3) and the maintenance of horses and armour (4 & 5 Ph. & M. c. 2), which placed the county militia under a lord lieutenant appointed by the monarch and assisted by deputy lieutenants. The entry into force of these Acts in 1558 is seen as the starting date for the organised county militia in England.

== Suffolk Trained Bands ==
Although the militia obligation was universal, it was clearly impractical to train and equip every able-bodied man, so after 1572 the practice was to select a proportion of men for the Trained Bands (TBs), who were mustered for regular training. From 1583 the maritime counties such as Suffolk were given precedence for training: in return for a reduced quota they were supplied with professional captains to muster and train them. The Armada Crisis in 1588 led to the TBs being called out as the Armada approached. Suffolk was ordered to assign 2000 men to defend the county's ports and landing places and to send 2500 into Essex to join the Queen's army at Tilbury.

With the passing of the threat of invasion, the TBs declined in the early 17th Century, but renewed Anglo-French tensions in the 1620s led to the Suffolk TBs being placed on alert for duty at Landguard Fort. Later, King Charles I attempted to reform the TBs into a national force or 'Perfect Militia' answering to the king rather than local control. In 1638 the Suffolk Trained Bands mustered four regiments of foot and one of horse. The TBs were called upon to send contingents for the Bishops' Wars, in 1639 and 1640. Suffolk was unusually obedient in providing good men and weapons in 1639, but in 1640 the Suffolk men were unwilling, and mutinied.

Control of the trained bands was one of the major points of dispute between Charles I and Parliament that led to the First English Civil War. When open warfare broke out between the King and Parliament, neither side made much use of the TBs beyond securing the county armouries for their own full-time troops who would serve anywhere in the country, many of whom were former trained bandsmen.

However, when the Second English Civil War broke out in 1648, the whole county force of Suffolk was called out to oppose the Royal army that had invaded Essex. The Suffolk TBs participated in the Siege of Colchester. They were embodied again during the insurrection in neighbouring Norfolk in November 1650. During the Third English Civil War a temporary brigade recruited from the Eastern Counties TBs for six months' service was sent north, but when the Scottish army moved south the Suffolk TBs marched to take part in the Battle of Worcester.

== Restoration militia ==
After the Restoration of the Monarchy, the English Militia was re-established by the Militia Act of 1661 under the control of the king's lords lieutenant, the men to be selected by ballot. This was popularly seen as the 'Constitutional Force' to counterbalance a 'Standing Army' tainted by association with the New Model Army that had supported Cromwell's military dictatorship, and almost the whole burden of home defence and internal security was entrusted to the militia.

James Howard, 3rd Earl of Suffolk, was re-appointed Lord Lieutenant of Suffolk (and Cambridge), having previously held the post in 1640–42. He personally held the colonelcy of the Suffolk regiment of horse militia, and was also governor of Landguard Fort from 1665.

Militia musters were supposed to be held for four days each year, but in many counties this did not happen for several years at a time. Suffolk was one of the offending counties, and several times in the 1660s the Earl of Suffolk had to 'iterate' his orders for the settlement of the militia, as he was being called on for progress reports and feared the displeasure of Parliament. It was not until 1664 that the county militia had been reorganised:

- Col Sir Henry North, 1st Baronet's Foot Regiment – Bury St Edmunds division
- Col Sir Philip Cooke's Foot Regiment – Ipswich division
- Col Sir Edmund Bacon's Foot Regiment – Half in Bury and half in Ipswich divisions
- Probably a foot regiment allocated to the Beccles division
- Suffolk Horse Militia under the Earl of Suffolk

=== Second Anglo-Dutch War ===
During the mid-17th century Suffolk was one of the counties most vulnerable to raids. Following the outbreak of the Second Anglo-Dutch War in 1665 musters lasting seven days in April and May were ordered for the Suffolk foot companies. A Dutch fleet cruised off the Suffolk coast for several weeks after the Four Days' Battle in June 1666, and the guns of Landguard Fort opened fire on a Dutch scout ship. The two militia companies stationed at Southwold were stood down, then on 10 July the Dutch appeared off the town, and the troops there had to be hurriedly reinforced. Next day the inhabitants of Aldeburgh were frightened by the appearance of Dutch warships, having only '35 ill-disciplined men of the trained band and 20 guns, but not enough to manage them'. Then on 22 July coast watchers saw the refitted and reinforced English fleet sailing up from the Thames Estuary. Three days later it routed the Dutch fleet at the St. James' Day Battle. The Earl of Suffolk ordered this victory to be celebrated at Ipswich with 'bonfires, guns and bells'.

After the success at the St James's Day Battle, and with peace negotiations in progress, the British government became complacent and to save money it did not commission all its warships for the 1667 campaign. However, in June the Dutch fleet carried out a devastating raid on the River Medway, destroying a partly-built fort at Sheerness and burning or capturing many of the warships laid up in the estuary. The fleet then sailed north to the Suffolk coast.

In early June Lord Berkeley was appointed Lieutenant-General of Militia for Suffolk, Cambridgeshire and the Isle of Ely, and by 13 June he and his staff had established the regional defence headquarters at Harwich. Reports of the approaching Dutch came on 19 June, and the available troops were moved south, the Essex Militia to the coast and the Suffolk towards Landguard, leaving Aldeburgh, Lowestoft, Southwold and Dunwich unguarded. The people of Aldeburgh were reported to be moving their valuables inland in case of attack. Next day the Dutch were sighted off Harwich, where the authorities prepared blockships to close the harbour entrance, and fireships to use against the Dutch warships. With detachments still raiding the Thames Estuary, the main Dutch fleet cruised off Suffolk, causing the militia to reoccupy the coastal towns: Sir John Rous, 1st Baronet (MP for Dunwich) took his company back to Southwold, Sir Edmund Bacon's company went back to Lowestoft, and there were three companies and a horse troop at Aldeburgh.

On 1 July the Dutch fleet off Harwich disappeared northwards, only to come back close inshore next day, having received reinforcements for its landing force. As they ran down before a favourable wind, the Dutch could see Sir Philip Parker, 1st Baronet's 'White Regiment' of Suffolk Militia being ferried across the River Deben at Bawdsey Ferry in an attempt to shadow their progress. A detachment of Dutch gunboats was sent in and opened fire to stop this operation, leaving more than half the foot militia north of the river, and forcing the horse militia to ride round the estuary via Woodbridge. The gunboats only withdrew when the tide changed in the afternoon, and the rest of the foot could be ferried over to Felixstowe. Meanwhile, five companies of the Yellow Regiment of Suffolk Militia under Major Holland had been ordered to march out of Old Felixstowe down to Landguard Fort.

The Dutch anchored off Felixstowe about midday and the landings began in the afternoon about 2 miles (3.2 km) north of Landguard Fort. About 1650 infantry, marines and sailors were landed with engineering equipment to make an attempt on the fort. They marched south, putting out flank guards in the hedgerows to keep Holland's militia at a distance (also hovering around were the sixth company of the Yellow regiment and their affiliated troop of horse, and a troop from Cambridgeshire). Two squadrons of warships also stood in to bombard the fort, but could not get close because of sandbanks, reducing the effect of their fire. The garrison of the fort consisted of a company of the Lord High Admiral's Regiment under Captain Nathaniel Darell, bolstered to about 200 by Major Holland and some of his men. The attacking force consisted of three storming parties each of about 200 musketeers, equipped with grenades, fascines (to throw into the fort's ditch) and scaling ladders. These columns came under heavy musketry and cannon fire from the garrison. Their return fire was ineffective. They also came under fire from English warships in the harbour firing over the neck of land, and by a small vessel that came close inshore and fired into the shingle to create potentially fatal showers of stones. The Dutch sought cover and suffered few casualties, though some did penetrate as far as the palisades guarding the ditch.

Finding the fort both stronger and more strongly held than they had anticipated, the Dutch called off the attack and withdrew to their beachhead. The Earl of Suffolk now had about 1500 men of the White and Yellow Regiments, including those ferried from Bawdsey, and three troops of horse, and these were skirmishing with the Dutch flank guard in the enclosures, threatening the landing beach held by the Dutch pikemen. The Dutch decided to evacuate their force. English observers attributed this final Dutch withdrawal to their seeing the colours of the Suffolk Militia displayed above them along Felixstowe cliff. The Dutch held the militia off until nightfall and were rowed back to the fleet, which sailed away next day. The Suffolk Militia had suffered some casualties during the fighting, and their officers were reported to be disgusted with the Earl of Berkeley's command. After the battle the Dutch fleet sailed slowly up the coast and anchored off Aldeburgh on the evening of 3 July. The town was garrisoned by two troops of horse and four companies of Rous's militia regiment under Lt-Col Sir Robert Brooke, MP. Next day the deputy lieutenants of Suffolk ordered the rest of Rous's regiment to assemble at Beccles or Blythburgh, but no further landing was made and the Dutch left. The Earl of Suffolk discharged the militia, both horse and foot, to their homes on 10 July, even though some Dutch warships could still be seen off the coast until 21 July when peace was signed.

The Suffolk Militia fell back into decay after the end of the war, and in 1671 the Earl of Suffolk instructed his deputies to put the 'trayned force' in order, because he did not know when the King might order a muster, and he feared they were in bad state. When the Third Dutch War broke out the following year, the Suffolk Militia were short of men through the neglect of the deputy lieutenants, and short of officers because of 'death', 'sulking' and 'fear'. The Suffolk Militia was called out to reinforce Landguard Fort in 1673, but the Earl was still complaining of the discontinuance of musters when the war ended in 1674.

The Earl of Suffolk was one of a number of lords lieutenant removed from office for their political views during the Exclusion Crisis late in the reign of Charles II. He was replaced by the Earl of Arlington of the Court Party, and after Arlington's death by his son-in-law, Charles II's illegitimate son, Henry FitzRoy, 1st Duke of Grafton. Grafton was a professional soldier, who served James II against the Monmouth Rebellion but then declared for William of Orange in 1688. The militia continued to function fitfully during William's reign, being called out during an invasion scare in 1690.

In 1697 the counties were required to submit detailed lists of their militia. Suffolk complied, but had to base its list on the county's most recent muster, which had been in 1692. Under Charles Cornwallis, 3rd Baron Cornwallis as Lord Lieutenant, the Suffolk Militia then comprised:

- Red Regiment, Col Anthony Crofts, from Hoxne, 460 men in 6 companies
- White Regiment, Col Sir Philip Parker, 2nd Baronet, from South Suffolk, 509 men in 7 companies
- Blew Regiment, late Col Sir Philip Skippon (died 1691), from Beccles, 657 men in 8 companies
- Yellow Regiment, Col Sir Thomas Barnardiston, 2nd Baronet, from West Suffolk, around Clare, 660 men in 8 companies
- Ipswich, 181 men in two companies
- Horse, Col Lord Cornwallis, 208 men in 4 troops

Giving a total of 2675 men.

The Militia passed into virtual abeyance during the long peace after the Treaty of Utrecht in 1712, although it was called out during the Jacobite risings of 1715 and 1745.

== 1759 reforms ==
Under threat of French invasion during the Seven Years' War a series of Militia Acts from 1757 re-established county militia regiments, the men being conscripted by means of parish ballots (paid substitutes were permitted) to serve for three years. There was a property qualification for officers, who were commissioned by the lord lieutenant. Suffolk was given a quota of 960 men to raise. The militia was strongly supported by the new Lord Lieutenant of Suffolk, the 3rd Duke of Grafton, and the county was one of the first to raise its quota. Grafton was ordered organise his men into two battalions as the 1st or Western Battalion at Bury St Edmunds under Colonel the 'Honourable Nassau' (probably the Hon Richard Nassau, later 5th Earl of Rochford; Grafton himself took command later), and the 2nd or East Suffolk Battalion at Ipswich commanded by Col Francis Vernon of Orwell Park (later Member of Parliament for Ipswich, who became Lord Orwell in 1762). The government would only issue arms from the Tower of London to militia regiments when they had enrolled 60 per cent of their quota: for the two Suffolk regiments this was on 27 April 1759, which was taken as their official date of formation. The regiments were embodied for full-time service on 16 October 1759.

Suffolk was also one of the first counties to tackle the question of family allowances for the balloted militiamen: the justices of the peace were ordered to fix uniform rates for the allowances, a method that was incorporated into later militia legislation. Soldiers' pay was subject to various stoppages at the discretion of the Colonel for cleaning, repair and replacement of clothing and equipment. A venal colonel could make a great deal of money from his command, but the East Suffolks were proud that their regiment only had one stoppage, of 5 pence (2p) per week for 'small clothing'>

At the end of 1759 the Suffolk Militia regiments made their first marches outside the county, which was a novel experience for most of the junior officers and men. The West Suffolks went to Peterborough and Oundle, the East Suffoks to Leicester. In October 1760 both regiments marched back to Bury St Edmunds and went into winter quarters in their home county. In May 1761 the West Suffolks went to Hilsea outside Portsmouth until October while the East Suffolks remained in Suffolk, detaching five companies to Landguard Fort. Both regiments spent the rest of their embodied service in their home county, apart from June 1762, when the East Suffolks attended a training camp at Sandheath, near Ripley.

With the Seven Years War drawing to a close, Grafton and Orwell were instructed on 20 December 1762 to disembody the two battalions. Annual training continued thereafter, and officers were commissioned to fill vacancies. Although Ensign Cobbold was described as a Yeoman, the officers were generally drawn from the landed gentry of the county and guarded their status jealously: in 1768 one of the Suffolk battalions demanded the resignation of one of their ensigns who had become an innkeeper.

=== War of American Independence ===
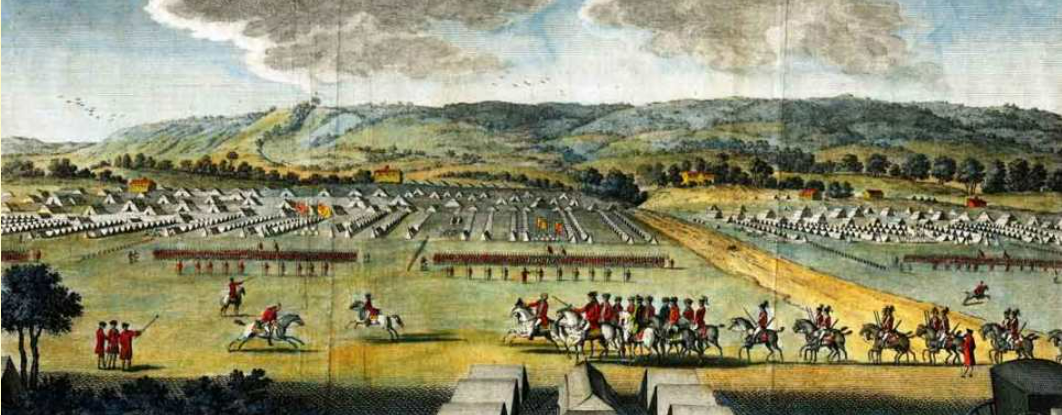
Coxheath Camp in 1778.

The militia was called out after the outbreak of the War of American Independence when the country was threatened with invasion by the Americans' allies, France and Spain. On 26 March 1778 Grafton was ordered to embody the two regiments once more. Both regiments attended training camps that summer, the West Suffolks at Coxheath Camp near Maidstone in Kent, the East Suffolks at Warley Camp in Essex. At these encampments the completely raw Militia were exercised as part of a division alongside Regular troops while providing a reserve in case of French invasion. The following summer the West Suffolks went to Warley and the East Suffolks to Coxheath.

The Duke of Grafton resigned his commission on grounds of ill-health in February 1780 and on 2 June 1780 his son and heir, George, Earl of Euston, was commissioned as colonel of the West Suffolk Militia. In the summer of that year the West Suffolks were stationed at Hull in East Yorkshire and then wintered in North East England, the East Suffolk were at Chatham. In the summers of 1781 and 1782 the West Suffolks were in camp at Warley and Danbury Common in Essex and wintered in Suffolk and Essex, while the East Suffolks were distributed across the two counties. By the end of 1782 a peace treaty had been agreed and the war was coming to an end, so orders to disembody the Suffolk Militia were issued on 4 March 1783.

From 1784 to 1792 the militia were supposed to assemble for 28 days' annual training, even though to save money only two-thirds of the men were actually called out each year. In 1786 the number of permanent NCOs was reduced.

=== French Revolutionary Wars ===
The militia was already being called out when Revolutionary France declared war on Britain on 1 February 1793. The order to embody the Suffolk Militia had gone out on 4 December 1792. Each of the two battalions was to consist of eight companies, one of which was a light company, and could include an additional company of volunteers. Lord Euston reported from Suffolk that substitutes would be unwilling to serve if their families were not eligible for the allowances given to balloted men, and so they were included in the Militia Bill before Parliament.

The French Revolutionary Wars saw a new phase for the English militia: they were embodied for a whole generation, and became regiments of full-time professional soldiers (though restricted to service in the British Isles), which the regular army increasingly saw as a prime source of recruits. They served in coast defences, manning garrisons, guarding prisoners of war, and for internal security, while their traditional local defence duties were taken over by the Volunteers and mounted Yeomanry.

With a French invasion possible, the government augmented the strength of the embodied militia in 1794: the West Suffolks by 63 men and the East Suffolks by 56, the men recruited by voluntary enlistment and paid for by county subscriptions. In a fresh attempt to have as many men as possible under arms for home defence in order to release regulars, the Government created the Supplementary Militia in 1796, a compulsory levy of men to be trained in their spare time, and to be incorporated in the Militia in emergency. Suffolk's additional quota was fixed at 1470 men, and these were called out at Ipswich on 31 January 1798, the supplementary battalions of the West and East Suffolks going to Colchester and Ashford respectively. The purpose of the call-out was to replace militiamen who had volunteered to transfer to the Regular Army, and to augment the embodied militia, the West Suffolks to 1125 all ranks in 10 companies, the East Suffolks to 1073 in 8 companies.

Part of the reason for the augmentation was the outbreak of the Irish Rebellion of 1798, which drew away many of the regulars from mainland Britain. Legislation passed in March 1798 (the Militia (No. 4) Act 1798) also allowed the English militia to volunteer for service in Ireland. The augmented West Suffolk Militia volunteered, but only half the East Suffolk were prepared to go. The West Suffolks served there in 1798–99, while the last embers of the rebellion were put down.

=== Napoleonic Wars ===
By now the danger of invasion seemed to have passed, and the militia were reduced, the two Suffolk battalions to less than 500 each. Hostilities ended with the Treaty of Amiens on 27 March 1802, and on 14 April warrants were issued to disembody the Suffolk Militia. However, the Peace of Amiens was short-lived and Britain declared war on France once more in May 1803 when both Suffolk Militia regiments were re-embodied.

Militia duties during the Napoleonic War were much as before: home defence and garrisons, prisoners of war, and increasingly internal security in the industrial areas where there was unrest. Increasingly the regular army regarded the militia as a source of trained men and many militiamen took the proffered bounty and transferred, leaving the militia regiments to replace them through the ballot or 'by beat of drum'. The Suffolk Militia resumed their annual moves around the country, the West Suffolks spending 1808–13 in Northern England, where they had to deal with Luddite disturbances. The East Suffolks spent 1805–6 in Scotland, but generally were deployed in the South Coast defences.

=== Local Militia ===
While the Militia were the mainstay of national defence during the Revolutionary and Napoleonic Wars, they were supplemented from 1808 by the Local Militia, which were part-time and only to be used within their own districts. These were raised to counter the declining numbers of Volunteers, and if their ranks could not be filled voluntarily the Militia Ballot was employed. They would be trained once a year. On 24 December 1808 the 4th Duke of Grafton, Lord Lieutenant of Suffolk, issued commissions to officers in the Colneis Battalion (in Colneis Hundred, south of Ipswich), under Maj George Wenyeve, and the Risbridge Battalion (in Risbridge Hundred, in the west of the county) under Maj William Robinson, and by 1 June 1809 he was issuing commissions in the Babergh Battalion (in Babergh Hundred around Sudbury). However, he also issued commissions in a number of continuing volunteer corps.

The Local Militia was strengthened in 1812: on 1 May Gilbert Affleck was appointed Lt-Col of the Risbridge Battalion, and Martin Cocksedge as Lt-Col of the Babergh Battalion, which were now referred to as regiments; on 1 June George Wenyeve of the Colneis Battalion was also promoted to Lt-Col. Towards the end of the war the Suffolk Local Militia must have been reorganised, because on 1 May 1815 Roger Pettiward was commissioned as Lt-Col of the 1st Eastern Regiment of Suffolk Local Militia. There were presumably at least two regiments in East Suffolk, because a uniform button is recorded for the 2nd East Suffolk Local Militia raised at Woodbridge.

=== Ireland ===
The Interchange Act 1811 allowed English militia regiments to serve in Ireland (and vice versa), for a period of two years. The West Suffolks served there from April 1813 until September 1814, when they returned to Bury St Edmunds to be disembodied at the end of the Napoleonic War. The East Suffolks also went to Ireland, in February 1814, and were still serving there while the short Waterloo campaign was fought. They finally returned to Ipswich to be disembodied in February 1816.

After Waterloo there was another long peace. Although officers continued to be commissioned into the militia and ballots were still held until they were suspended by the Militia Act 1829, the regiments were rarely assembled for training and the permanent staffs of sergeants and drummers (who were occasionally used to maintain public order) were progressively reduced. The East Suffolks became a Light Infantry regiment in 1831.

== 1852 reforms ==
The Militia of the United Kingdom was revived by the Militia Act 1852, enacted during a renewed period of international tension. As before, units were raised and administered on a county basis, and filled by voluntary enlistment (although conscription by means of the Militia Ballot might be used if the counties failed to meet their quotas). Training was for 56 days on enlistment, then for 21–28 days per year, during which the men received full army pay. Under the Act, Militia units could be embodied by Royal Proclamation for full-time home defence service in three circumstances:

1. 'Whenever a state of war exists between Her Majesty and any foreign power'.
2. 'In all cases of invasion or upon imminent danger thereof'.
3. 'In all cases of rebellion or insurrection'.

The 1852 Act introduced Artillery Militia units in addition to the traditional infantry regiments. Their role was to man coastal defences and fortifications, relieving the Royal Artillery (RA) for active service. The East Suffolk Light Infantry was converted into the Suffolk Artillery Militia with five batteries based at Ipswich.

War having broken out with Russia in 1854 and an expeditionary force sent to the Crimea, the militia began to be called out for home defence. The West Suffolk Militia was embodied from December 1854 to June 1856. The Suffolk Artillery Militia served from March 1855 to July 1856. It was also embodied during the Indian Mutiny, from April 1859 to November 1860.

Thereafter the militia regiments were called out for their annual training. The Militia Reserve introduced in 1867 consisted of present and former militiamen who undertook to serve overseas in case of war.

== Cardwell and Childers reforms ==
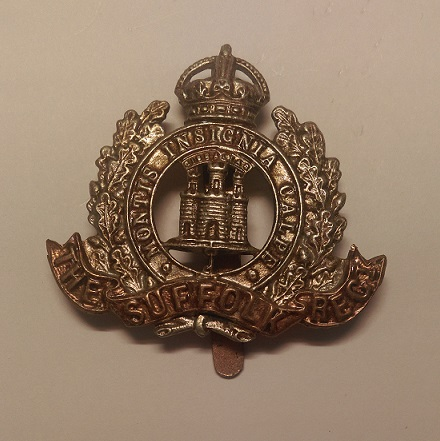
Cap badge of the Suffolk Regiment.

Under the 'Localisation of the Forces' scheme introduced by the Cardwell Reforms of 1872, militia regiments were brigaded with their local regular and Volunteer battalions. Sub-District No 32 (Suffolk & Cambridge) set up its depot at the County Buildings in Bury St Edmunds, headquarters of the West Suffolk Militia. It comprised:

- 1st and 2nd Battalions, 12th (East Suffolk) Regiment of Foot
- West Suffolk Militia
- Cambridgeshire Militia at Ely
- 1st Administrative Battalion, Suffolk Rifle Volunteer Corps at Sudbury
- 2nd Administrative Battalion, Suffolk Rifle Volunteer Corps at Woodbridge
- 3rd Administrative Battalion, Suffolk Rifle Volunteer Corps at Lowestoft
- 1st Administrative Battalion, Cambridgeshire Rifle Volunteer Corps at Cambridge
- 3rd (Cambridge University) Cambridgeshire Rifle Volunteer Corps at Cambridge

Gibraltar Barracks, was opened at Bury St Edmunds as the new depot for the sub-district in 1878.

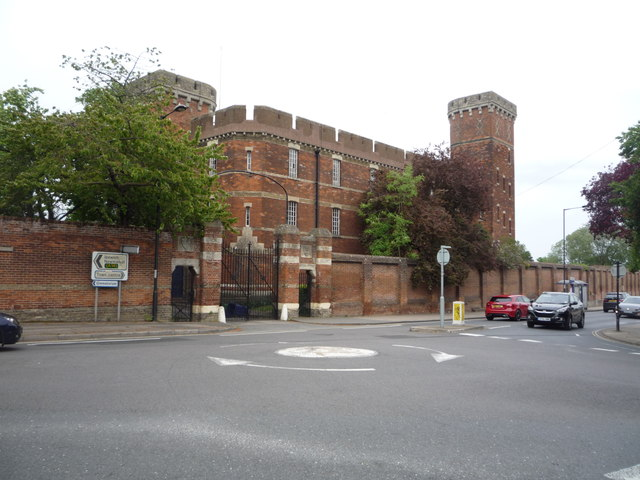
Gibraltar Barracks, Bury St Edmunds.

The militia now came under the War Office rather than their county lords lieutenant. Around a third of the recruits and many young officers went on to join the regular army. The Childers Reforms of 1881 completed the Cardwell process by converting the linked regular regiments into county regiments and incorporating the militia battalions into them:

- 3rd (West Suffolk Militia) Battalion, Suffolk Regiment
- 4th (Cambridge Militia) Battalion, Suffolk Regiment

The Artillery Militia was reorganised into 11 divisions of garrison artillery in 1882, and the Suffolk unit became the 3rd Brigade, Eastern Division, RA. from 1 April 1882. This was changed to Suffolk Artillery, Eastern Division, RA on 1 July 1889.

=== Second Boer War ===
After the disasters of Black Week at the start of the Second Boer War in December 1899, most of the regular army was sent to South Africa, and many militia units were embodied to replace them for home defence and to garrison certain overseas stations. The 3rd Suffolks were embodied in December 1899 and served in the Channel Islands from January 1900 to April 1901.The battalion was disembodied in July 1901, but the war dragged on and the battalion was re-embodied in February 1902 and served until finally disembodied in September 1902.

The Suffolk Artillery was also embodied from May to November 1900. In the postwar reorganisation of the Royal Artillery, the divisions were scrapped and the Suffolk Artillery became the Suffolk Royal Garrison Artillery (Militia) in 1902.

== Special Reserve ==
After the Boer War, the future of the Militia was called into question. There were moves to reform the Auxiliary Forces (Militia, Yeomanry and Volunteers) to take their place in the six Army Corps proposed by the Secretary of State for War, St John Brodrick. However, little of Brodrick's scheme was carried out. Under the more sweeping Haldane Reforms of 1908, the Militia was replaced by the Special Reserve (SR), a semi-professional force whose role was to provide reinforcement drafts for regular units serving overseas in wartime, rather like the earlier Militia Reserve.

The 3rd Battalion transferred to the SR on 7 June 1908 becoming the 3rd (Reserve) Battalion, Suffolk Regiment.

The Suffolk RGA (M) converted into the Suffolk Royal Field Reserve Artillery on 24 May 1908, but after a change in policy it was disbanded on 15 October 1909.

=== World War I ===
On the outbreak of World War I the 3rd Bn Suffolks was embodied at Bury St Edmunds and went to its war stations at Felixstowe in the Harwich defences. As well as defence tasks, its role was to equip the Reservists and Special Reservists of their regiment and send them as reinforcement drafts to the Regular battalions serving overseas. Once the pool of reservists had dried up, the 3rd Bn trained thousands of raw recruits for the active service battalions and reserve battalions were established alongside them to carry out the same role for the 'Kitchener's Army' battalions. It continued this role until after the Armistice with Germany and was disembodied in 1919.

=== Postwar ===
The SR resumed its old title of Militia in 1921 but like most militia units the 3rd Suffolks remained in abeyance after World War I. By the outbreak of World War II in 1939, only one officer other than the Hon Colonel remained listed for the 3rd Bn. The Militia was formally disbanded in April 1953.

== Heritage and ceremonial ==
=== Uniforms and insignia ===
It might be assumed that the 'Red', 'White', 'Blew' and 'Yellow' regiments of Suffolk Militia of the 1690s were clothed in uniforms of those colours, but it is more likely that these titles refer to distinguishing facings on the uniform red coats and the field of the regimental colour. (Note: For example, Sir William Portman's Regiment of Somerset Militia was known as the 'Yellow Regiment' from its facings.) At the end of the Seven Years War In 1762 both battalions of the Suffolk Militia wore red facings, and the East Suffolks were recorded at Warley Camp in 1778 as still wearing red. But by 1780 both regiments wore yellow facings, and continued with these through the Napoleonic Wars. By 1850 the West Suffolks still wore yellow facings but the East Suffolk LI had changed to white. When it became a battalion of the Suffolk Regiment in 1881, the West Suffolks adopted the white facings of that regiment.

Around 1810 the officers' shoulder-belt plate of the 1st or West Suffolk Militia had an 'S' below the numeral 'I' within a crowned garter inscribed 'West Suffolk Militia'. Prior to 1855 the buttons also bore the numeral 'I' within a crowned circle inscribed 'West Suffolk'. The regiment used the Roman numeral 'X' (signifying its 10th place in the militia order of precedence) in its forage cap badge. Similarly, the East Sussex LI wore buttons with the numeral '34' within the strings of a light infantry bugle-horn.

From 1853 to 1881, the West Suffolks used the twin-towered castle badge of Suffolk within a crowned wreath, with a scroll beneath bearing the words 'West Suffolk Militia'. This was first worn as an ornament on the skirts of officers' coats, and from 1874 was adopted as the cap badge. The 12th Foot began using the triple-towered 'castle with key' (signifying the Battle Honour 'Gibraltar') in about 1861, and it was authorised as the regimental badge in 1872. The militia battalions will have adopted this form in 1881.

=== Precedence ===
In the Seven Years War militia regiments camped together took precedence according to the order in which they had arrived. During the War of American Independence the counties were given an order of precedence determined by ballot each year. For the Suffolk Militia the positions were:

- 39th on 1 June 1778
- 36th on12 May 1779
- 42nd on 6 May 1780
- 31st on 28 April 1781
- 26th on 7 May 1782

The militia order of precedence balloted for in 1793 (Suffolk was 19th) remained in force throughout the French Revolutionary War: this covered all the regiments in the county. Another ballot for precedence took place at the start of the Napoleonic War, when Suffolk was 59th.This order continued until 1833. In that year the King drew the lots for individual regiments and the resulting list remained in force with minor amendments until the end of the militia. The regiments raised before the peace of 1763 took the first 47 places: the West Suffolk was 10th and the East Suffolk LI was 34th. Formally, the regiments became the '10th, or West Suffolk Militia' and '34th, or East Suffolk Light Infantry'. Although most regiments paid little notice to the additional number, both Suffolk regiments did include the numerals in their insignia. When the Militia Artillery was formed its regiments took precedence alphabetically; Suffolk was 25th.

== See also ==
- Militia (English)
- Militia (Great Britain)
- Militia (United Kingdom)
- Special Reserve
- Suffolk Trained Bands
- West Suffolk Militia
- East Suffolk Militia
- Suffolk Artillery Militia
