= Hundreds of Suffolk =

Historic county subdivisions

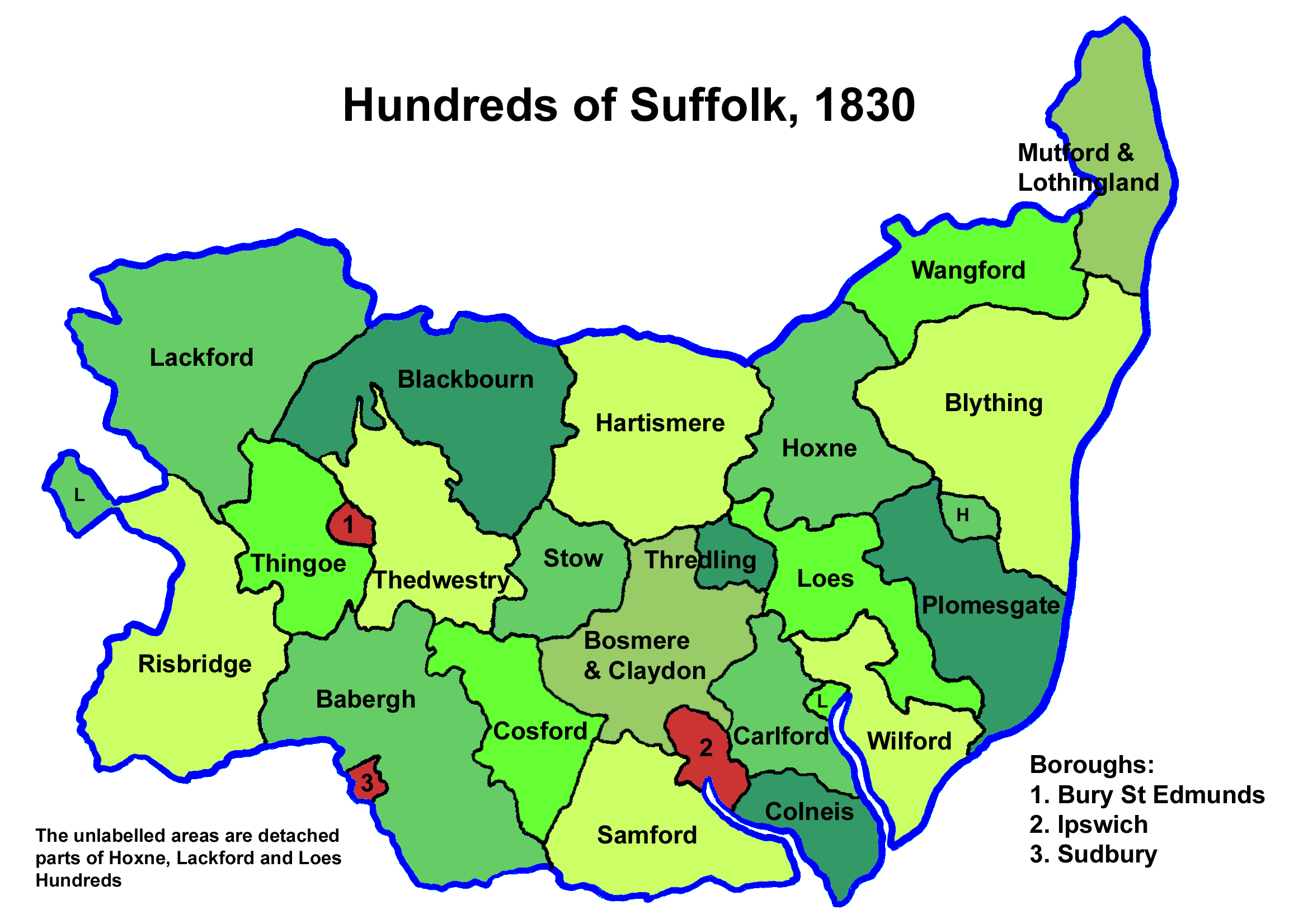

The county of Suffolk was divided into hundreds between Saxon times and the 19th century when, although never formally abolished, they were effectively replaced for administrative purposes by districts.

In 1831 the county was subdivided into twenty-one hundreds and three municipal boroughs. The majority of these hundreds had remained unchanged since the time of the Domesday Survey, except that in 1086 Babergh was listed as two hundreds, Cosford, Ipswich and Parham as half hundreds and Samford as a hundred and a half. Hoxne hundred was then known as Bishops hundred and the vills which were included later in Thredling hundred were within Claydon hundred.

== List of hundreds (1831) ==
Hundred	Area (acres)
Babergh	70632
Blackbourn	66272
Blything	87631
Bosmere-and-Claydon	48773
Carlford	25461
Colneis	16712
Cosford	30712
Hartismere	53479
Hoxne	55648
Lackford	83712
Loes	31321
Mutford and Lothingland	33368
Plomesgate	41579
Risbridge	58468
Samford	44940
Stow	22710
Thedwestry	40362
Thingoe	31850
Thredling	10000
Wangford	34679
Wilford	31500

In addition the county contained three boroughs, corresponding to the county's largest towns:

Borough	Area (acres)
Bury St Edmunds	3040
Ipswich	8450
Sudbury	1250

== See also ==
- History of Suffolk
- List of hundreds of England and Wales
