= Tuddenham (disambiguation) =

Tuddenham is the name of several places:

- Tuddenham, in West Suffolk
- Tuddenham St Martin, in East Suffolk
- North Tuddenham, in Norfolk
- East Tuddenham, in Norfolk
