= Kenton, Suffolk =

Village in Suffolk, England

Coordinates: 52.248206°N 1.209665°E

Kenton
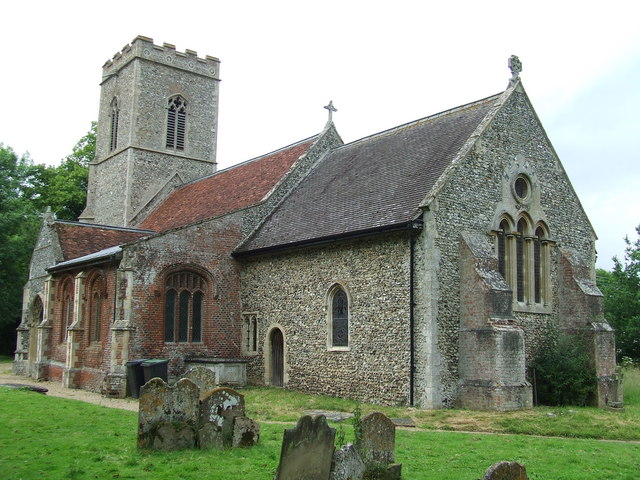
- All Saints Church, Kenton

- Location within Suffolk
- Population: 170 (2005); 237 (2011)
- District: Mid Suffolk
- Shire county: Suffolk
- Region: East
- Country: England
- Sovereign state: United Kingdom
- Post town: Stowmarket
- Postcode district: IP14
- Police: Suffolk
- Fire: Suffolk
- Ambulance: East of England
- UK Parliament: Central Suffolk and North Ipswich

Kenton is a village and civil parish in the Mid Suffolk district of Suffolk in eastern England. Located 1.9 miles to the north-east of Debenham, in 2005 its population was 170. The parish was formerly an exclave of the Loes Hundred one of the Hundreds of Suffolk.

The name Kenton comes from the Old English for ‘Kingly’, or ‘Royal’ and can trace its origins back to before the Norman conquest.

Not to be confused by Kenton, a place partly in the London Borough of Harrow and partly in the London Borough of Brent, and Kenton, a place in Devon.

Between 1908 and 1952 the village was served by the Mid-Suffolk Light Railway, on which it had a station with a platform, which was located over 0.6 miles south. The station had a small building made externally of corrugated iron and internally of match-boarding. Kenton station was halfway between Laxfield and Haughley on the branch line.

Kenton Hall (around 1200) resides nearby about half a mile south-west from the church.

Grass drying plant (operated by Eastern Counties Farmers) was just behind the old station.

== Present day ==
All Saints (Church OS grid TM 191 659) is on the unclassified road between Occold and Earl Soham and Church Lane with Church Close nearby.

It has a very fine brick built south aisle and chapel, flush with the porch and with its own entrance from it. It was built as a chantry chapel for the Garneys family in 1524, and was dedicated to St John.

The south aisle is now furnished and dedicated to the Blessed Virgin, rather than to St John. It once contained an excellent, intricate Garneys brass, contemporary with the chapel, which Cautley and Arthur Mee both saw in the 1930s.

Kenton Post Office (on Eye Road IP14 6JW) now closed - was a couple of hundred yards north of Church Lane/Close.

There are several farms in the area, Sycamore Farm (a few hundred metres north of the church), Moat Farm (an apple orchard a few hundred yards west of the church), and another near to the Hall.

Kenton Lodge is to the extreme south-east of the village.

The village is home to the prizewinning writer Niles Schilder who based his poem The Ditch on a location near his home.
