= Witnesham =

Village in Suffolk, England

Coordinates: 52.115°N 1.188°E

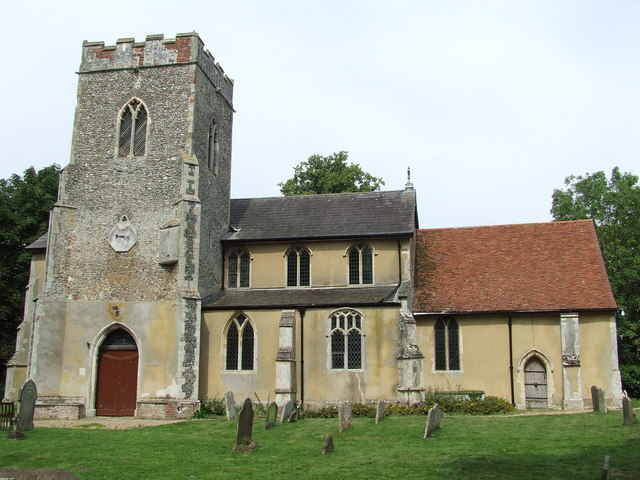
- Witnesham, Church of St Mary

- Location within Suffolk
- Population: 792 (2011)
- OS grid reference: TM1850
- Shire county: Suffolk
- Region: East
- Country: England
- Sovereign state: United Kingdom
- Post town: IPSWICH
- Postcode district: IP6
- Dialling code: 01473

Witnesham is a village situated roughly 4 miles (6 km) to the north of Ipswich, Suffolk. The main road from Ipswich that links the village to the town is the B1077, Westerfield Road.

== History ==
It appears in the Domesday Book of 1086 as 'Wytenesham’ (Witta's/Witten's meadow or enclosure) and had 10 villagers. It was a part of Carlford, one of the old Hundreds of Suffolk.

Witnesham Hall (OS grid TM1750) was built in the 16th century, and is further west past St Mary's church on Church Lane.

A murder was committed in 1896 in Rose Cottage [specific location unknown] where mentally unwell man George Smith murdered his elderly mother.

== Present day ==
In 2009 the estimated population of Witnesham was 810, decreasing to 792 at the 2011 census. The village amenities include a 1766 inn, The Barley Mow, on Mow Hill (OS grid TM 185 503) south of Witnesham, and a small primary school. The village Post Office was at the bottom of the village, nearest to Ipswich, but it has closed. Postal services are continued at the Baptist Church on a two-day basis.

The village has two churches, the Baptist Church being at the top of the village, north on Upper Road. The larger church, St Mary's Church of England (OS grid TM1850), is located west out of Witnesham along the Church Lane (no through lane), near the source of the River Fynn.

There are several farms in the area, such as White House Farm along Wash Lane to the east and Redhouse Farm to the south-east.

Westerfield railway station, situated around 2 miles (3.2 km) is served by Greater Anglia rail services to London Liverpool Street, Lowestoft, Ipswich and Felixstowe.

Local businesses include Fynn Valley Golf Club, a mile south, which has both 9 and 18 hole parkland golf courses, a golf driving range, golf shops and restaurant, and a bar and conference/function rooms.

== Governance ==
An electoral ward of the same name exists. This stretches to Playford with a total population of 1,965 as taken at the 2011 Census.

== Notable residents ==
- William King, pioneer of the co-operative movement
- William Kirby (1759–1850), entomologist
- Samuel Turner, recipient of the Victoria Cross
- Spencer John Bent, recipient of the Victoria Cross, lived with his mother's brother and wife at Verandah Cottage between the ages of 7 and 14 following the death of his father who was killed during the Boer War
- Carl Giles, who created the well-known "Giles" cartoons for the Daily Express.
