= Samuel Turner (VC) =

- Born: February 1826; Witnesham, Suffolk
- Died: 13 June 1868 (aged 42); Meerut, British India
- Burial place: St John's Cemetery, Meerut
- Military career
- Allegiance: United Kingdom
- Branch: British Army
- Rank: Private
- Units: 60th Rifles
- Conflicts: Indian Mutiny
- Awards: Victoria Cross

Samuel Turner VC (February 1826 – 13 June 1868) was an English recipient of the Victoria Cross, the highest and most prestigious award for gallantry in the face of the enemy that can be awarded to British and Commonwealth forces.

== Details ==
Turner was 31 years old, and a private in the 1st Battalion, 60th Rifles (later the King's Royal Rifle Corps) of the British Army during the Indian Mutiny, when the following deed on 19 June 1857 at Delhi, India took place for which he was awarded the VC:

Private Samuel Turner. Date of Act of Bravery, 19th June, 1857 For having, at Delhi, on the night of the 19th of June, 1857, during a severe conflict with the Enemy, who attacked the rear of the Camp, carried off on his shoulders, under a heavy fire, a mortally wounded Officer, Lieutenant Humphreys, of the Indian Service. During this service, Private Turner was wounded by a sabre cut in the right arm. His gallant conduct saved the above-named Officer from the fate of others, whose mangled remains were not recovered until the following day.
