= Wicklaw Hundreds =

Ancient administrative division of Suffolk, England

The Wicklaw Hundreds made up a jurisdictional liberty administered by Ely Abbey, but located in East Suffolk, England. The Wicklaw Hundreds consisted of seven separate hundreds: Wilford, Carlford, Colneis, Plomesgate, Thredling, Loes and Parham.
