= Shottisham =

Village in Suffolk, England

Coordinates: 52.052°N 1.382°E

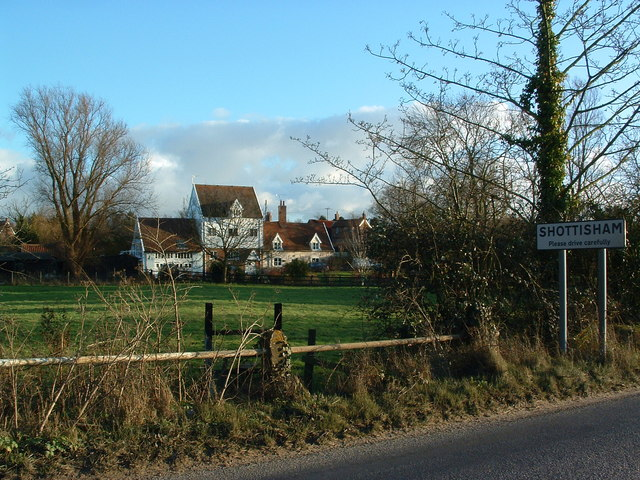
- Shottisham Watermill

- Location within Suffolk
- Population: 197 (2011)
- OS grid reference: TM 31995 44647
  - London: 98.9 mi (159.2 km)
- Civil parish: Shottisham
- District: East Suffolk
- Shire county: Suffolk
- Region: East
- Country: England
- Sovereign state: United Kingdom
- Post town: Woodbridge
- Postcode district: IP12
- Police: Suffolk
- Fire: Suffolk
- Ambulance: East of England
- UK Parliament: Suffolk Coastal

Shottisham is a village and civil parish in the East Suffolk district, in the county of Suffolk, England. It lies in the Wilford Hundred, about four and a half miles south-east of Woodbridge, between the parishes of Sutton, Alderton, Ramsholt and Hollesley. About three miles from the coast at Hollesley Bay and Shingle Street, the village street overlooks a slight hollow of meads and copses at the road crossing of Shottisham Creek, a tributary brook of the river Deben.

== History ==
The origins of Shottisham and its name can be traced back to Old English, being translated to 'Scot or *Sceot's homestead/village'. The earliest history of Shottisham is recorded in the 1086 Domesday Book and is described as being located in the Wilford Hundred. Shottisham had 24 households, which was quite large compared to other nearby village parishes, containing 1 smallholder and 15 free men. The land was valued at £1.8, of which the overlords at this time were Edric of Laxfield and Godric of Peyton.

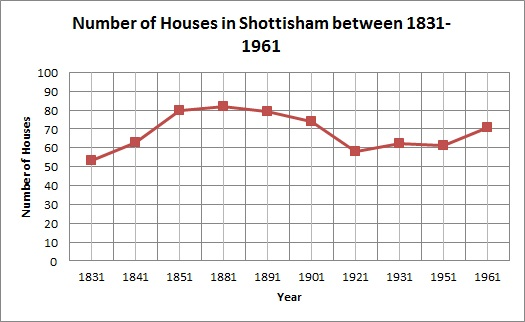
Total Number of Houses in Shottisham from 1831 to 1961

Parish boundary records for Shottisham date back to 1831. The village then had 2,320 acres of land: however, this figure had reduced by 1881 to 1,884 acres, owing to parish boundary changes.

Population census data from 1801 records 161 inhabitants, and by the 2011 census this had risen to 197. The 1851 census shows the highest figure, with 372 people.

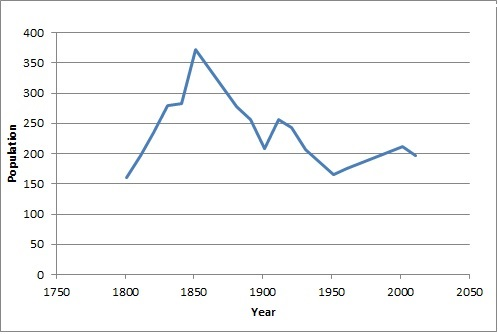
Population of Shottisham from 1801 to 2011

Occupational statistics from census data show that in 1831 just over 60% of residents were employed as agricultural labourers. Retail and handicrafts accounted for a further 28% of the population. The data for 1881 shows still the majority of men (around 66%) as agricultural labourers. The largest employment sector for women (20%) was in domestic services of offices.

St Margaret's, the medieval parish church, which has a square tower holding a single bell, was restored in 1845. In 1966 the church became a listed building. Other listed buildings in Shottisham include the Sorrel Horse Inn and Shottisham Hall.

In the 1870s, Shottisham was described as:

Shottisham, a parish, with a village, in Woodbridge district, Suffolk; 4¼ miles SE of Woodbridge r. station. It has a post-office under Woodbridge. The church was restored in 1867. There is a national school.

Shottisham's shop and post office closed in the early 1990s.

== Present day ==
Shottisham has seen a move from the majority of the population working in agriculture to a spread in the distribution. As of the 2011 census, the highest three employment sectors were primary education (14%), human health and social work activities (9.5%), and wholesale and retail trade and repair of motor vehicles (11%).

Due to Shottisham being located in a very rural area, there is no national public bus service; a private company runs a morning and evening timetable for residents of Shottisham who work in nearby Woodbridge. The nearest train station to the village is Melton, which is on the line between Ipswich and Lowestoft.

As of 2014, the average asking price for a house in Shottisham was £440,600, which was high compared to the national average of £250,000.

The Sorrel Horse pub dates back to the 15th century. In August 2011 it was bought collectively by the community; the shares that were sold raised £450,000 to keep the pub open.

There is also a small caravan/campsite with 30 pitches.

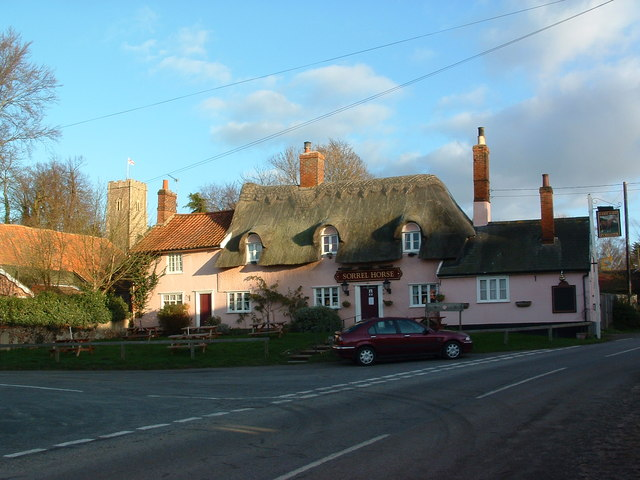
The Sorrel Horse pub and St Margaret parish church

== Education ==
There are no schools within Shottisham village. The two closest primary schools are Hollesley Primary School (2.5 miles away) and Bawdsey Primary School (4.2 miles away). The nearest secondary school is Farlingaye High School. The private Woodbridge School is also in the area.
