= Parham Hundred =

Historical division of Suffolk, England

Parham Hundred or Half Hundred, was one of the Wicklaw Hundreds, administered by Ely Abbey, but located in East Suffolk, England.

The Domesday Book recorded seven locations in Parham Half Hundred: The Half Hundred was absorbed into Plomesgate Hundred by the thirteenth century.

location	No. of households
Wantisden	52.5
Blaxhall	45
Parham	34
Brutge	13
Beversham	2
Niuetuna	1
Tunstall	0
