= Tuddenham St Martin =

Village in Suffolk, England

Coordinates: 52.091°N 1.198°E

Tuddenham St. Martin
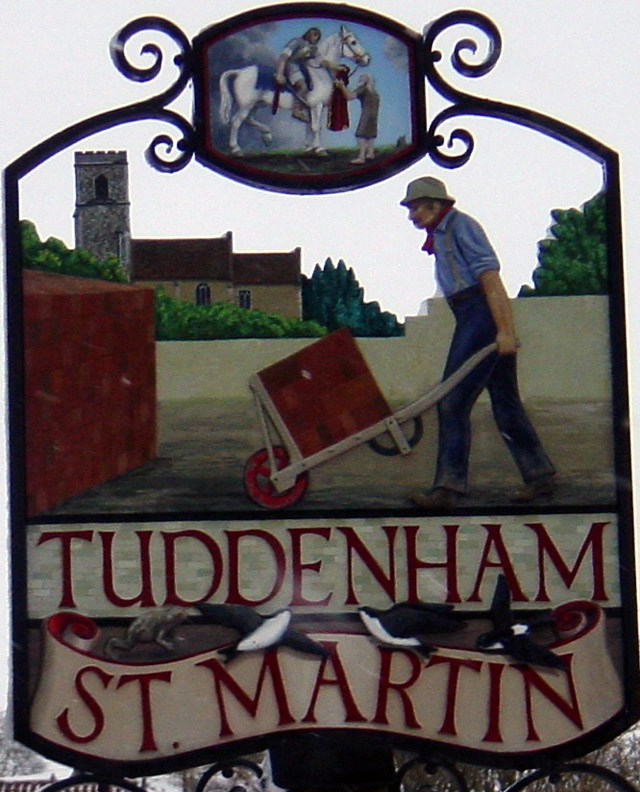
- Village Sign

- Location within Suffolk
- Population: 353 (2011)
- Civil parish: Tuddenham St Martin
- District: East Suffolk
- Shire county: Suffolk
- Region: East
- Country: England
- Sovereign state: United Kingdom
- Post town: Ipswich
- Postcode district: IP6
- UK Parliament: Central Suffolk and North Ipswich

Centre of Village & Village Sign in Snow

Tuddenham St Martin or Tuddenham is a village and civil parish in the East Suffolk district, in the county of Suffolk, England. It is just outside Ipswich, on the River Fynn. In 2011 the parish had a population of 353.

== Amenities ==
The village contains "The Fountain" restaurant as well as the church of St Martin in which lies the final resting place of cartoonist Carl Giles and his wife Joan. The pub was featured in a 1955 cartoon by Giles.

The village has its own magazine called The Tuddenham Tattler.

The social calendar includes "The Tuddenham TADPOLE's (Tuddenham Amateur Dramatic People Of Little Experience) Pantomime", the Village Fête, the Safari Supper and several Parish Picnics.

It was a part of the old Hundreds of Suffolk of Carlford.
