= Beversham =

Coordinates: 52.1723°N 1.4445°E

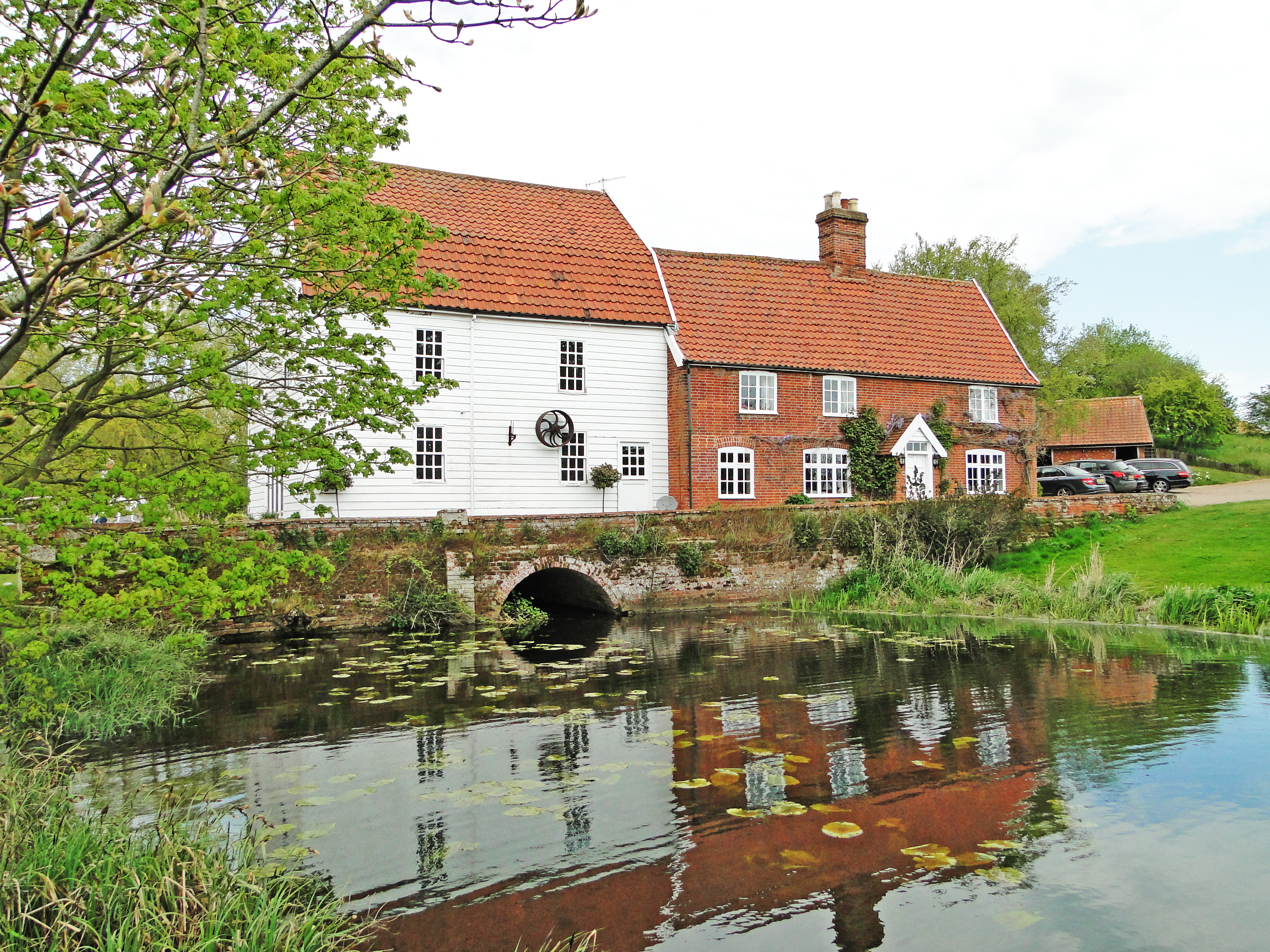

- Location within Suffolk
- Civil parish: Little Glemham
- District: East Suffolk
- Shire county: Suffolk
- Region: East
- Country: England
- Sovereign state: United Kingdom

Beversham is a location in the civil parish of Little Glemham, in the East Suffolk district, in the county of Suffolk, England. It was recorded as Beuresham and being in Parham Hundred and having two households in the Domesday Book. Little evidence of Beversham remains in the twenty first century. It is located between Little Glemham and Blaxhall. However a few structures have retained the name.

== Beversham Mill ==
Beversham Mill is a Grade II listed building. The attached house is an early 17th century timber-framed building which was clad with bricks in the early nineteenth century. The watermill itself is early 19th century and retains much of the machinery. Although a photograph from 1975 shows it as being derelict, it has subsequently been restored.

== Beversham Bridge ==
Beversham Bridge was shown on Joseph Hodskinson's 1783 map of Suffolk.

== Beversham Crossing ==
This level crossing was built for the opening of the East Suffolk Railway line in 1859. A cottage for the crossing guard was built at this time.
