= East Suffolk Militia =

Auxiliary unit of the British Army

East Suffolk Militia Suffolk Artillery Militia
- Active: 27 April 1759–15 October 1909
- Country: Kingdom of Great Britain (1759–1800); United Kingdom (1801–1909)
- Branch: Militia
- Type: Infantry; Artillery (after 1853)
- Size: 1 Regiment
- Garrison/HQ: Ipswich
- Mottos: Pro aris et focis ('For hearth and home')

Commanders
- Notable commanders: Francis Vernon, 1st Earl of Shipbrook; Robert Adair, 1st Baron Waveney

The East Suffolk Militia was an auxiliary (Note: It is incorrect to describe the British Militia as 'irregular': throughout their history they were equipped and trained exactly like the line regiments of the regular army, and once embodied in time of war they were fulltime professional soldiers for the duration of their enlistment.) military unit in the English county of Suffolk in East Anglia. First organised as one of two regiments in the county during the Seven Years' War it served on internal security and home defence duties in all of Britain's major wars. It was converted to artillery in 1853 and continued in that role until its disbandment in 1909.

== Background ==
The universal obligation to military service in the Shire levy was long established in England and its legal basis was updated by two acts of 1557 (4 & 5 Ph. & M. c. 3 and 4 & 5 Ph. & M. c. 2), which placed selected men, the 'Trained Bands', under the command of lords-lieutenant appointed by the monarch. This is seen as the starting date for the organised county militia in England. It was an important element in the country's defence at the time of the Spanish Armada in the 1580s, and control of the militia was one of the areas of dispute between King Charles I and Parliament that led to the English Civil War. The Suffolk Trained Bands were active in the Siege of Colchester and Battle of Worcester, and later in controlling the country under the Commonwealth and Protectorate. The English militia was re-established under local control in 1662 after the Restoration of the monarchy, and the Suffolk Militia played a prominent part in the Second Dutch War of 1667. However, after the Peace of Utrecht in 1715 the militia was allowed to decline.

== East Suffolk Militia ==
Under threat of French invasion during the Seven Years' War a series of Militia Acts from 1757 re-established county militia regiments, the men being conscripted by means of parish ballots (paid substitutes were permitted) to serve for three years. There was a property qualification for officers, who were commissioned by the lord lieutenant. Suffolk was given a quota of 960 men to raise. The militia was strongly supported by the new Lord Lieutenant of Suffolk, the 3rd Duke of Grafton, and the county was one of the first to raise its quota. Grafton was ordered organise his men into two battalions as the 1st or West Suffolk Battalion at Bury St Edmunds and the 2nd or East Suffolk Battalion at Ipswich commanded by Colonel Francis Vernon of Orwell Place (later Member of Parliament for Ipswich, who became Lord Orwell in 1762). The government would only issue arms from the Tower of London to militia regiments when they had enrolled 60 per cent of their quota: for the two Suffolk regiments this was on 27 April 1759, which was taken as their official date of formation. The regiments were embodied for full-time service on 16 October 1759.

Soldiers' pay was subject to various stoppages at the discretion of the Colonel for cleaning, repair and replacement of clothing and equipment. A venal colonel could make a great deal of money from his command, but the East Suffolks were proud that their regiment only had one stoppage, of 5 pence (2p) per week for 'small clothing'>

At the end of 1759 the Suffolk Militia regiments made their first marches outside the county, which was a novel experience for most of the junior officers and men. Ensign John Cobbold of the East Suffolks kept a diary of this march through Cambridge, Kettering, and Market Harborough to its assigned station at Leicester. On 14 October 1760 both regiments marched back to Bury St Edmunds and went into winter quarters in their home county, the East Suffolks at Beccles from 23 October, and later Woodbridge. In May 1761 the East Suffolks moved back to Ipswich, with 5 companies deploying to Landguard Fort in June. In October the regiment returned to Woodbridge for the winter. By January 1762 the East Suffolks had been expanded to 12 companies, with 7 in Ipswich and 5 at Landguard Fort. In June, under Lord Orwell, it attended a training camp at Sandheath, near Ripley. It spent the winter from October at Woodbridge as usual.

With the Seven Years War drawing to a close, Grafton and Orwell were instructed on 20 December 1762 to disembody the two battalions, and the East Suffolks returned to Ipswich to carry this out. Annual training continued thereafter, and officers were commissioned to fill vacancies. Although Ensign Cobbold was described as a Yeoman, the officers were generally drawn from the landed gentry of the county and guarded their status jealously: in 1768 one of the Suffolk battalions demanded the resignation of one of their ensigns who had become an innkeeper.

=== War of American Independence ===
The militia was called out after the outbreak of the War of American Independence when the country was threatened with invasion by the Americans' allies, France and Spain. On 26 March 1778 Grafton was ordered to embody the two regiments once more. The regiments were inspected by general officers to determine if they were fit for service. The East Suffolks were reported as one of those regiments that had 'few or bad officers', but the regiment was nevertheless adequately trained.

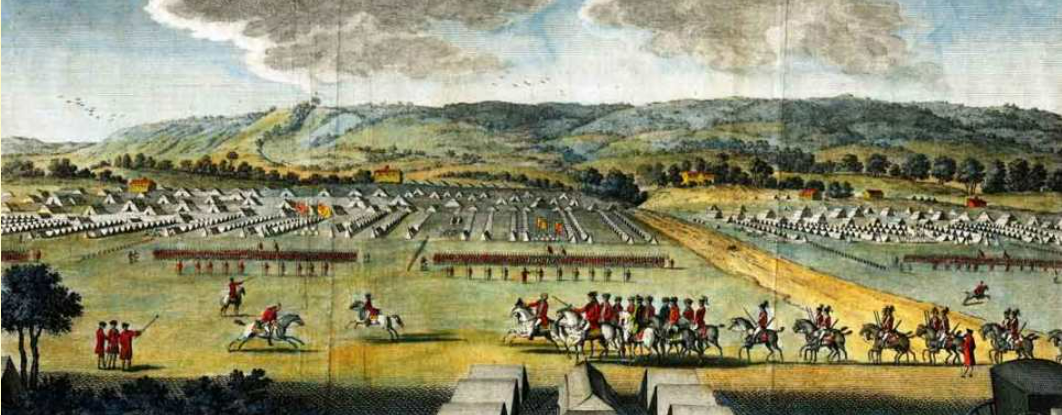
Coxheath Camp in 1778.

On 1 June 1778 the East Suffolks marched out to Warley Camp in Essex. At these summer encampments the completely raw Militia were exercised as part of a division alongside Regular troops while providing a reserve in case of French invasion of South East England. In November the regiment went into winter quarters in Essex, with 4 of its 8 companies at Romford and Hare Street, and the remainder distributed between Woodford, Epping, Ongar, Dagenham and Ilford. On 1 June the following year it went to at Coxheath Camp near Maidstone in Kent, which was the army's largest training camp. The East Suffolks formed part of the Right Wing under Maj-Gen Staats Long Morris, an American Loyalist officer.

After the camp broke up, the East Suffolks returned to Ipswich on 27 November and were then quartered in detachments across Suffolk, at Beccles, Bungay, Halesworth, Yoxford, Saxmundham and Lowestoft. From 30 May 1780 the regiment was at the defended port of Chatham, Kent, with the recruits detached to nearby Faversham on 29 September. It was not until 20 October the following year that it returned to Suffolk for winter quarters, with headquarters and 4 companies at Beccles, lowestoft and Bungay, 2 distributed between Woodbridge, Wickham Market, Framlingham and Aldeburgh, and the remaining 2 across Blythburgh, Halesworth, Saxmundham and Southwold. On 22 June 1782 the regiment was ordered to march to Brentwood, Essex, then on 8 November the remaining 7 companies were distributed in small detachments across Suffolk and Essex. By the end of 1782 a peace treaty had been agreed and the war was coming to an end, so orders to disembody the Suffolk Militia were issued on 4 March 1783.

From 1784 to 1792 the militia were supposed to assemble for 28 days' annual training, even though to save money only two-thirds of the men were actually called out each year. In 1786 the number of permanent non-commissioned officers (NCOs) was reduced, and Captain Walter Waring, a company commander of the East Suffolks, quarrelled with his commanding officer, Col Edward Goate, over the demotion of a corporal: both officers claimed the right to make such decisions (Waring accused Goate of using NCOs' places to provide for musicians whom he ought to have paid out of his own pocket). The dispute continued to 1789, with Waring offering to transfer to the West Suffolks. Both sides appealed to the Duke of Grafton as Lord Lieutenant, who referred the question to the Home Secretary. He in turn insisted that it was Grafton's decision, and the duke reluctantly recommended Waring's transfer.

=== French Revolutionary War ===
The militia was already being called out when Revolutionary France declared war on Britain on 1 February 1793. The order to embody the Suffolk Militia had gone out on 4 December 1792. Each of the Suffolk battalions was to consist of eight companies, one of which was a light company. They were also issued with two light 'battalion guns'.

The French Revolutionary Wars saw a new phase for the English militia: they were embodied for a whole generation, and became regiments of full-time professional soldiers (though restricted to service in the British Isles), which the regular army increasingly saw as a prime source of recruits. They served in coast defences, manning garrisons, guarding prisoners of war, and for internal security, while their traditional local defence duties were taken over by the Volunteers and mounted Yeomanry.

On 7 February 1793 the East Suffolks deployed on the coast with 6 companies at Great Yarmouth in Norfolk and the other 2 at Lowestoft, then on 19 June it went to summer camp at Harwich, along with the Bedfordshire and West Kent Militia. The camp broke up on 10 October, when the East Suffolks went to winter at Newmarket, with 11 detachments in the surrounding area.

With a French invasion possible, the Government augmented the strength of the embodied militia in early 1794: the East Suffolks by 59 men, recruited by voluntary enlistment and paid for by county subscriptions. The regiment spent from 7 May to 31 October that year encamped at Caister in Norfolk before moving into Great Yarmouth (5 companies), Lowestoft (1 company) and several small detachments (2 companies) for the winter. Its summer camp in 1795 was at Warley (12 May–16 October) after which it wintered in Harwich (2 companies0, Landguard Fort (4) and detachments (2). On 19 April 1796 the East Suffolks moved to Canterbury, beginning a stay of several years in Kent. The regiment was dispersed across the county on 17 May, with 2 companies going to Tunbridge Wells, 2 to Penshurst, and 4 between Tonbridge, Malling, Mereworth, Teston and Yalding. In the autumn it concentrated at Ashford for the winter.

On 17 February 1797 the militia were directed to be formed into brigades for their summer training. The East Suffolks, together with the Bedfordshires, Derbyshires, East Hampshires, and Yorkshire West Ridings, formed Gen Sir Charles Grey's 4th Brigade of the division under Gen Sir William Howe. In May the East Suffolks marched to Dover Castle to relieve the West Yorkshire Militia, who took over their quarters at Ashford. An eyewitness observed that the East Suffolks marched in with 14 loads of baggage, carried in hired waggons. In August the regiment was inspected at the castle by the Commander-in-Chief, the Duke of York, accompanied by Sir Charles Grey. During the year nearly 300 men drawn from the East Suffolk and Montgomeryshire Militia were employed in constructing the modern defences at Dover Castle. In May 1798 the regiment returned to Ashford Barracks.

In a fresh attempt to have as many men as possible under arms for home defence in order to release regulars, the Government created the Supplementary Militia in 1796, a compulsory levy of men to be trained in their spare time, and to be incorporated in the Militia in emergency. Suffolk's additional quota was fixed at 1470 men, and these were called out at Ipswich on 31 January 1798, where the West Suffolks were stationed and could carry out their initial training. The supplementary battalion of the East Suffolks then marched to join its regiment at Ashford. The purpose of the call-out was to replace militiamen who had volunteered to transfer to the Regular Army, and to augment the embodied militia for the possibility of serving in Ireland, the East Suffolks' new establishment being 1073 all ranks in 8 companies. (Note: One usually reliable source says that the East Suffolk Militia 'volunteered for and served in Ireland, 1798–9, under Colonel Goate, and was one of the thirteen Militia regiments immediately sent to that country on the passing of the Act', but the list of stations in the regimental history excludes that possibility (though the West Suffolks did go). Sir Charles Grey reported in 1799 that only half the East Suffolks were willing to serve in Ireland.)

In the autumn of 1798 the East Suffolks moved to Dungeness for the winter. The following spring they left Kent and moved to Northern England, marching out on 16 April for their new station at Hull, the Grenadier Company (which had been detached to Canterbury) rejoining at Sevenoaks during the march. By now the danger of invasion seemed to have passed, and the militia were reduced, the two Suffolk battalions to less than 500 each. When the East Suffolks were inspected at Leeds in September 1800, the regiment mustered 32 officers and 459 ORs, reported as 'a serviceable body of men'. The regiment arrived at Sheffield on 12 November, when it was sent to the Midlands, marching in two 'divisions' to Stourbridge, Dudley and adjacent places for the winter. By January 1801 it was at Wolverhampton. On 2 September that year it was sent back to Chelmsford in Eastern England.

The French Revolutionary War was drawing to a close, and hostilities ended with the Treaty of Amiens on 27 March 1802. The East Suffolks were marched to Ipswich on 12 April and two days later warrants were issued to disembody both regiments of Suffolk Militia.

=== Napoleonic Wars ===
However, the Peace of Amiens was short-lived and Britain declared war on France once more in 1803 when both Suffolk Militia regiments were re-embodied on 12 May. The East Suffolks at Ipswich had a new establishment of 30 officers, 28 sergeants, 19 drummers and 547 rank and file. It was still under the command of Col Goate, though he was replaced on 26 May 1803 by Charles, Viscount Brome, eldest son of Marquess Cornwallis; he succeeded as the 2nd Marquess two years later. Militia duties during the Napoleonic Wars were much as before: home defence and garrisons, guarding prisoners of war, and increasingly internal security in the industrial areas where there was unrest. Increasingly the regular army regarded the militia as a source of trained men and many militiamen took the proffered bounty and transferred, leaving the militia regiments to replace them through the ballot or 'by beat of drum'.

The East Suffolks remained at Ipswich until 21 June when it marched to Hull. Now 715 strong in 10 companies, it, was part of the militia brigade garrisoning the port alongside regular artillery. Another duty of the militia here was to prevent smuggling by the local inhabitants. The regiment left Hull on 4 July 1805 when it moved to Berwick-upon-Tweed and Tweedmouth on the Scottish Border. By 1 September the regiment with 560 men in 8 companies under Lt-Col John White was at Aberdeen Barracks forming the bulk of Brig-Gen John Gordon-Cumming's brigade. It subsequently spent two years in Scotland.

In 1807 the regiment went back to Kent, spending the winter at Sheerness. It was in Maidstone during 1808 before returning to Sheerness on 15 February 1809. In June it was at Ashford for the summer, then went to Winchelsea in Sussex on 14 October. From 28 November it was in winter quarters in Berkshire at Hungerford and Speen, Newbury. On 8 April 1810 the regiment moved to Middlesex, first at Brentford, then on 14 May to Acton, Ealing and Hanwell; in June it sent a detachment to do duty at the Tower of London. In August 1810 the East Suffolks moved to Portsmouth in Hampshire, in which area they would spend the new few years. In October 1811 they were t Porchester, and spent 1812–13 at Gosport.

=== France and Ireland ===
During the period 1803–1813 the regiment supplied 1119 volunteers to regiments of the line (from its established strength of 521 men), mainly to the 43rd Light Infantry. In addition, from November 1813 the militia were invited to volunteer for limited overseas service, primarily for garrison duties in Europe. From the East Suffolks 2 officers and 83 ORs volunteered, serving in the 2nd Provisional Battalion under Lt-Col Edward Bayley of the Royal West Middlesex Militia. The 2nd Provisional Bn assembled at Chelmsford and marched to Portsmouth where the Militia Brigade was assembling, arriving on 5 March. The brigade embarked on 10–11 March 1814 and joined the Earl of Dalhousie's division that had occupied Bordeaux just as the war was ending. The brigade did not form part of the Army of Occupation after the abdication of Napoleon and returned to England in June.

Meanwhile, the rest of the East Suffolks went to Ireland in February 1814, and were still serving there while the short Waterloo campaign was fought in 1815. Indeed, even after the battle, on 16 August and 25 November two strong drafts of recruits were sent from Ipswich to Liverpool to be sent to reinforce the regiment in Ireland. The East Suffolks finally returned to Ipswich in January 1816 to be disembodied the following month.

=== Long Peace ===
After Waterloo there was another long peace. Although officers continued to be commissioned into the militia and ballots were still held until they were suspended by the Militia Act 1829, the regiments were rarely assembled for training and the permanent staffs of sergeants and drummers (who were occasionally used to maintain public order) were progressively reduced.

After the death of Marquess Cornwallis in 1823, Henry, Earl of Euston (later 5th Duke of Grafton), a half-pay Lieutenant in the 7th Hussars, was appointed colonel of the regiment on 23 September 1823. On 24 May 1830 he transferred to the vacant colonelcy of the West Suffolk Militia and was succeeded in command of the East Suffolks by John Rous, 2nd Earl of Stradbroke, who had served in the Coldstream Guards during the Peninsular War and at the Battle of Quatre Bras.

The East Suffolks became a Light Infantry regiment in 1831.

Henry Bence Bence of Thorington Hall was promoted to colonel of the East Suffolk LI on 3 May 1844. He had served in the 16th Light Dragoons during the Peninsular War, being wounded at the Battle of Talavera, and had joined the East Suffolks as a major at the same time that the Earl of Euston became colonel, being promoted to lt-col on 24 May 1837. His second-in-command, also appointed on 3 May 1844, was Lt-Col Charles Blois of Cockfield Hall, who had served in the Royal Dragoons and been wounded at Waterloo.

== Suffolk Artillery Militia ==
The Militia of the United Kingdom was revived by the Militia Act 1852, enacted during a renewed period of international tension. As before, units were raised and administered on a county basis, and filled by voluntary enlistment (although conscription by means of the Militia Ballot might be used if the counties failed to meet their quotas). Training was for 56 days on enlistment, then for 21–28 days per year, during which the men received full army pay. Under the Act, Militia units could be embodied by Royal Proclamation for full-time home defence service in three circumstances:

1. 'Whenever a state of war exists between Her Majesty and any foreign power'.
2. 'In all cases of invasion or upon imminent danger thereof'.
3. 'In all cases of rebellion or insurrection'.

The 1852 Act introduced Artillery Militia units in addition to the traditional infantry regiments. Their role was to man coastal defences and fortifications, relieving the Royal Artillery (RA) for active service. In 1853 the East Suffolk Light Infantry was converted into the Suffolk Artillery Militia with five batteries based at Ipswich. While Henry Bence Bence remained Colonel of the Regiment, Robert Shafto Adair, MP, (who later became Lord Waveney) was appointed Lieutenant-Colonel Commandant. In 1854 the new unit was painted by John Duvall undergoing training with heavy field guns on Landguard Common, and drilling in Landguard Fort. The corps was provided with a purpose-built barracks on the north side of Ipswich, opened in 1855.

=== Crimean War and Indian Mutiny ===
War having broken out with Russia in 1854 and an expeditionary force sent to the Crimea, the militia began to be called out for home defence. The Suffolk Artillery Militia was embodied at Ipswich early in 1855, and detachments were stationed at Landguard Fort, Tilbury Fort, and at Hull, later concentrated at Landguard. The unit volunteered for overseas service in the Mediterranean, but this offer was not taken up. It was disembodied in July 1856

It was also embodied on 12 April 1859 during the absence of much of the regular army fighting in the Indian Mutiny. This time it served in the defences of Portsmouth until November 1860.

=== Cardwell Reforms ===
Following the Cardwell Reforms a mobilisation scheme began to appear in the Army List from December 1875. This assigned places in an order of battle of the 'Garrison Army' to Militia Artillery units: the Suffolk Artillery's war station was in the Harwich Defences, including Landguard Fort, the Circular Redoubt, Angel Gate Battery, Shotley Battery, and adjacent towers. (Note: The Army List for the 1870s actually lists a 'West Suffolk Reg' as providing the militia artillery for the Harwich defences: this is clearly an error for the Suffolk Artillery Militia, the infantry of the West Suffolk Militia being assigned to the 2nd Brigade of 2nd Division, VII Corps.)

The Artillery Militia was reorganised into 11 divisions of garrison artillery in 1882, and the Suffolk unit became the 3rd Brigade, Eastern Division, RA. from 1 April 1882. This was changed to The Suffolk Artillery, Eastern Division, RA, on 1 July 1889.

=== Second Boer War ===
After the disasters of Black Week at the start of the Second Boer War in December 1899, most of the regular army was sent to South Africa, and many militia units were embodied to replace them for home defence and to garrison certain overseas stations. The Suffolk Artillery was embodied from 1 May to 6 November 1900.

In the postwar reorganisation of the Royal Artillery, the divisions were scrapped and the Suffolk Artillery became the Suffolk Royal Garrison Artillery (Militia) in 1902.

=== Special Reserve and disbandment ===
Under the more sweeping Haldane Reforms of 1908, the Militia was replaced by the Special Reserve (SR), a semi-professional force whose role was to provide reinforcement drafts for regular units serving overseas in wartime.

The Suffolk RGA (M) converted into the Suffolk Royal Field Reserve Artillery on 24 May 1908, but after a change in policy it was disbanded on 15 October 1909.

== Heritage & Ceremonial ==
=== Uniforms & Insignia ===
In 1762 both battalions of the Suffolk Militia wore red facings on their red coats and the East Suffolks were recorded at Warley Camp in 1778 as still wearing red. But by 1780 both regiments wore yellow facings, and continued with these through the Napoleonic Wars. By 1850 the East Suffolk LI had changed to white facings.

The East Sussex LI wore buttons with the numeral '34' within the strings of a light infantry bugle-horn.

When the unit became artillery militia in 1853 it adopted a similar uniform to the Regular RA, in blue with red facings and trouser stripe, but with silver/white lace and piping instead of gold/yellow. The officers' waistbelt clasp in about 1880 was gilt, with the intertwined letters 'SA' in silver. From 1882 the officers wore the standard Eastern Division RA helmet plate, but in 1889 the words 'EASTERN DIVISION' on the lower scroll were replaced with "SUFFOLK ARTILLERY'. The officers' pouch flaps and sabretaches were embroidered with the Sea Holly (Eryngium maritimum) found growing on Landguard Common.

=== Precedence ===
In the Seven Years War militia regiments camped together took precedence according to the order in which they had arrived. During the War of American Independence the counties were given an order of precedence determined by ballot each year. For the Suffolk Militia the positions were:

- 39th on 1 June 1778
- 36th on12 May 1779
- 42nd on 6 May 1780
- 31st on 28 April 1781
- 26t on 7 May 1782

The militia order of precedence balloted for in 1793 (Suffolk was 19th) remained in force throughout the French Revolutionary War: this covered all the regiments in the county. Another ballot for precedence took place at the start of the Napoleonic War, when Suffolk was 59th.This order continued until 1833. In that year the King drew the lots for individual regiments and the resulting list remained in force with minor amendments until the end of the militia. The regiments raised before the peace of 1763 took the first 47 places: the East Suffolk LI was 34th. Formally, it became the '34th, or East Suffolk Light Infantry Militia'; most regiments paid little notice to the additional number, the East Suffolks included it in their insignia. When the Militia Artillery was formed its regiments took precedence alphabetically, Suffolk being 25th.

=== Colonels ===
The following served as Colonel of the East Suffolk Militia:

- Col Francis Vernon, 1st Earl of Shipbrook, from 27 April 1759
- Col William Wollaston, until 1780
- Col Gibb, promoted 1780
- Col Edward Goate, until 1803
- Col Charles Cornwallis, 2nd Marquess Cornwallis, appointed 26 May 1803 died 9 August 1823
- Col Henry, Earl of Euston (later 5th Duke of Grafton), appointed 23 September 1823; transferred to West Suffolk Militia 24 May 1830
- Col John Rous, 2nd Earl of Stradbroke, appointed 24 May 1830
- Col Henry Bence Bence, promoted 3 May 1844

After 1852 regimental colonels were abolished in the militia and replaced by Honorary Colonels:

- Col Robert Adair, 1st Baron Waveney (first CO of Suffolk Artillery Militia), appointed 19 November 1881
- Frederick Thellusson, 5th Baron Rendlesham, appointed 12 February 1887

== See also ==
- Militia (Great Britain)
- Militia (United Kingdom)
- Special Reserve
- Suffolk Militia
- West Suffolk Militia
- Militia Artillery units of the United Kingdom and Colonies

== Bibliography ==
- W. Y. Baldry, 'Order of Precedence of Militia Regiments', Journal of the Society for Army Historical Research, Vol 15, No 57 (Spring 1936), pp. 5–16. JSTOR 44227944.
- Ian F.W. Beckett, The Amateur Military Tradition 1558–1945, Manchester: Manchester University Press, 1991, ISBN 0-7190-2912-0.
- Steve Brown, 'Home Guard: The Forces to Meet the Expected French Invasion/1 September 1805' at The Napoleon Series (archived at the Wayback Machine).
- W. Y. Carman, 'Militia Uniforms 1780', Journal of the Society for Army Historical Research, Vol 36, No 147 (September 1958), pp. 108–9. JSTOR 44226867.
- W. Y. Carman, 'Philip J. de Loutherbourg and the Camp at Warley, 1778'. Journal of the Society for Army Historical Research, Vol 71, No 288 (Winter 1993), pp. 276–277. JSTOR 44224825.
- Capt John Davis, Historical Records of the Second Royal Surrey or Eleventh Regiment of Militia, London: Marcus Ward, 1877.
- Sir John Fortescue, A History of the British Army, Vol I, 2nd Ed., London: Macmillan, 1910.
- Sir John Fortescue, A History of the British Army, Vol II, London: Macmillan, 1899.
- Sir John Fortescue, A History of the British Army, Vol III, 2nd Ed., London: Macmillan, 1911.
- J. B. M. Frederick, Lineage Book of British Land Forces 1660–1978, Vol I, Wakefield: Microform Academic, 1984, ISBN 1-85117-007-3.
- Lt-Col H.G. Hart, The New Annual Army List, and Militia List (various dates from 1840).
- Col George Jackson Hay, An Epitomized History of the Militia (The Constitutional Force), London: United Service Gazette, 1905/Ray Westlake Military Books, 1987, ISBN 0-9508530-7-0/Uckfield: Naval & Military Press, 2015 ISBN 978-1-78331-171-2.
- Brig Charles Herbert, 'Coxheath Camp, 1778–1779', Journal of the Society for Army Historical Research, Vol 45, No 183 (Autumn 1967), pp. 129–48. JSTOR 44226981.
- Richard Holmes, Soldiers: Army Lives and Loyalties from Redcoats to Dusty Warriors, London: HarperPress, 2011, ISBN 978-0-00-722570-5.
- Frank Hussey, Suffolk Invasion: The Dutch Attack on Landguard Fort, 1667, Lavenham: Terence Dalton, 1983; Landguard Fort Trust reprint 2005, ISBN 0-86138-027-4.
- Jeremy Ive, 'The Local Dimensions of Defence: the Standing Army and Militia in Norfolk, Suffolk and Essex, 1649–1660', Cambridge University PhD Thesis, 1987.
- Roger Knight, Britain Against Napoleon: The Organization of Victory 1793–1815, London: Allen Lane, 2013/Penguin, 2014, ISBN 978-0-14-103894-0.
- Norman E. H. Litchfield, The Militia Artillery 1852–1909 (Their Lineage, Uniforms and Badges), Nottingham: Sherwood Press, 1987, ISBN 0-9508205-1-2.
- Col K. W. Maurice-Jones, The History of Coast Artillery in the British Army, London: Royal Artillery Institution, 1959/Uckfield: Naval & Military Press, 2005, ISBN 978-1-84574-031-3.
- Militia List, House of Commons Paper, 18 July 1839.
- H. Moyse-Bartlett, 'Dover at War', Journal of the Society for Army Historical Research, 1972, Vol 50, No 203 (Autumn 1972), pp. 131–154. JSTOR 44223961.
- Col R. W. S. Norfolk, Militia, Yeomanry and Volunteer Forces of the East Riding 1689–1908, York: East Yorkshire Local History Society, 1965.
- Sir Charles Oman,A History of the Peninsular War, Vol VII, August 1813 to April 14, 1814, Oxford: Clarendon Press, 1930/London: Greenhill Books, 1997, ISBN 1-85367-227-0.
- H. G. Parkyn, 'English Militia Regiments 1757–1935: Their Badges and Buttons', Journal of the Society for Army Historical Research, Vol 15, No 60 (Winter 1936), pp. 216–248. JSTOR 442196788.
- Capt B. E. Sargeaunt, The Royal Monmouthshire Militia, London: RUSI, 1910/Uckfield: Naval & Military Press, ISBN 978-1-78331-204-7.
- Arthur Sleigh, The Royal Militia and Yeomanry Cavalry Army List, April 1850, London: British Army Despatch Press, 1850/Uckfield: Naval and Military Press, 1991, ISBN 978-1-84342-410-9.
- Percy Sumner, 'Militia Facings 1762', Journal of the Society for Army Historical Research, Vol 27, No 110 (Summer 1949), p. 88. JSTOR 44232185
- War Office, A List of the Officers of the Militia, the Gentlemen & Yeomanry Cavalry, and Volunteer Infantry of the United Kingdom, 11th Ed., London: War Office, 14 October 1805/Uckfield: Naval and Military Press, 2005, ISBN 978-1-84574-207-2.
- Lt-Col E. A. H. Webb, History of the 12th (The Suffolk) Regiment 1685–1913, London: Spottiswoode, 1914/Uckfield: Naval & Military, 2001, ISBN 978-1-84342-116-0.
- J. R. Western, 'The County Fencibles and Militia Augmentation of 1794', Journal of the Society for Army Historical Research, March 1956, Vol 34, pp. 3–11. JSTOR 44222225.
- J. R. Western, The English Militia in the Eighteenth Century: The Story of a Political Issue 1660–1802, London: Routledge & Kegan Paul, 1965.

=== External sources ===
- T.F. Mills, Land Forces of Britain, the Empire and Commonwealth – Regiments.org (archive site)
