= Thredling Hundred =

Historical division of Suffolk, England

Coordinates: 52.22°N 1.18°E

Thredling Hundred

Thredling was a hundred of Suffolk, and at just under 10,000 acres (40 km^{2}) the smallest of Suffolk's 21 hundreds.

The five parishes of Thredling fall into the Deanery of Claydon, the Archdeaconry of Suffolk, and the Diocese of Norwich. The hundred was bounded by Loes, Carlford, Hoxne, Hartismere and Bosmere and Claydon. The River Deben has its source here. It was one of seven Saxon hundreds grouped together as the Wicklaw Hundreds.

The origin of the hundred's name is not known, though one theory derives it from "Thrythhild", known to be a female first name of the Saxon era.

== Parishes ==
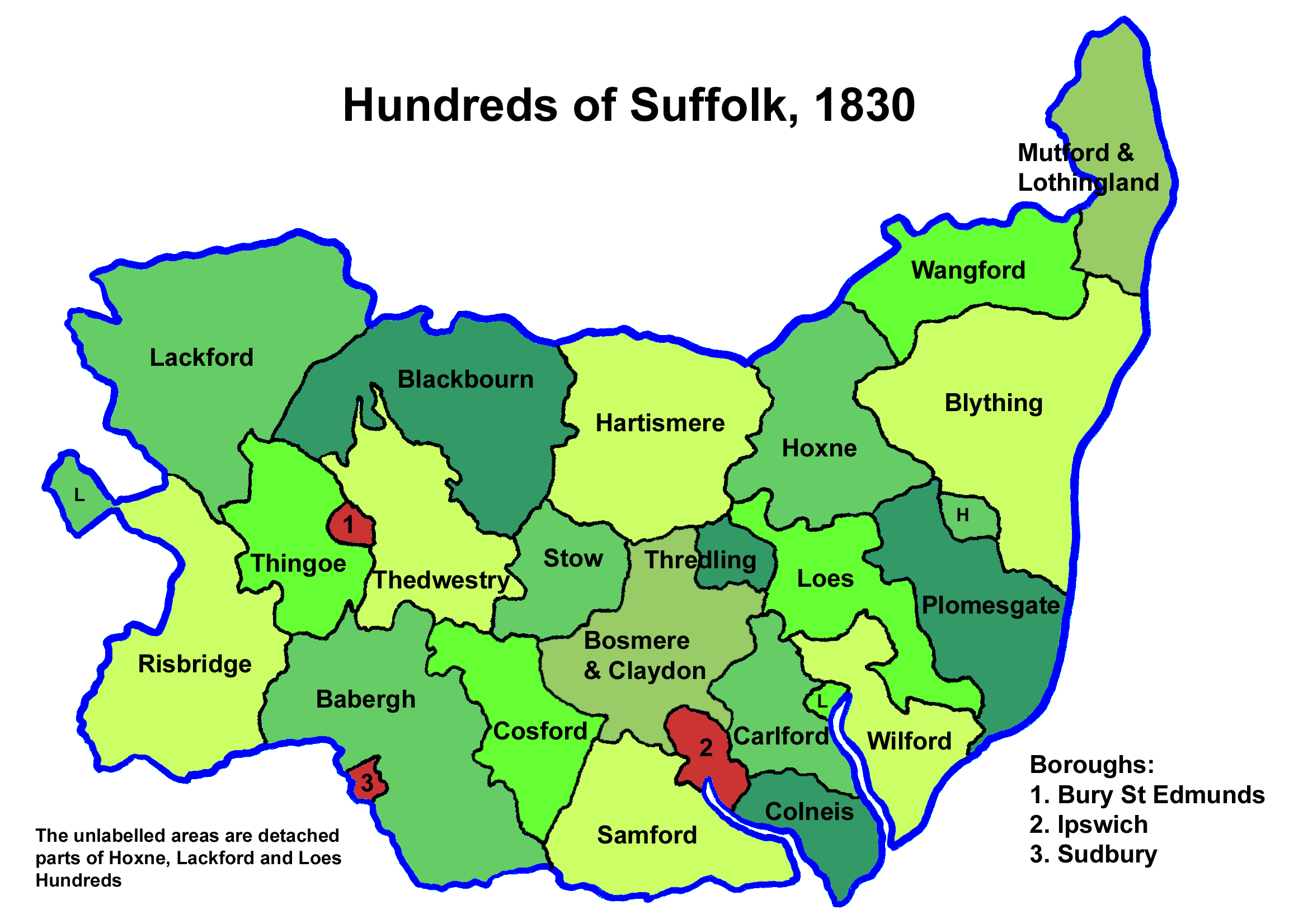
Suffolk hundreds

Thredling Hundred consisted of the following 5 parishes:

Parish	Area (acres)
Ashfield-cum-Thorpe	1565
Debenham	3271
Framsden	2837
Pettaugh	795
Winston	1470
