= Bosmere and Claydon Hundred =

Former administrative division of Suffolk, United Kingdom

Coordinates: 52.15°N 1.1°E

Bosmere and Claydon Hundred

Bosmere and Claydon was a hundred of Suffolk, consisting of 31,850 acres (128.9 km^{2}).

The hundred is a fertile and picturesque district varying from 8 to about 12 miles (19 km) in length and breadth. It is bounded on the south by the Borough of Ipswich and Samford Hundred, on the west by Cosford and Stow Hundreds on the north by Hartismere and Thredling Hundreds and on the east by Carlford Hundred. It falls in the Deaneries of Bosmere and Claydon in the Archdeaconry of Suffolk and Diocese of Norwich.

Its clay soil has long been associated with agriculture, and is suited to grain production. It is crossed by the River Gipping which becomes the River Orwell at Ipswich on becoming an estuary. Its main settlement is the town of Needham Market.

The hundred's name is taken from the parish of Claydon which falls within its bounds, and Bosmere, originally "Bosa's mere", a small lake near Needham Market in the grounds of Bosmere Hall.

== Parishes ==
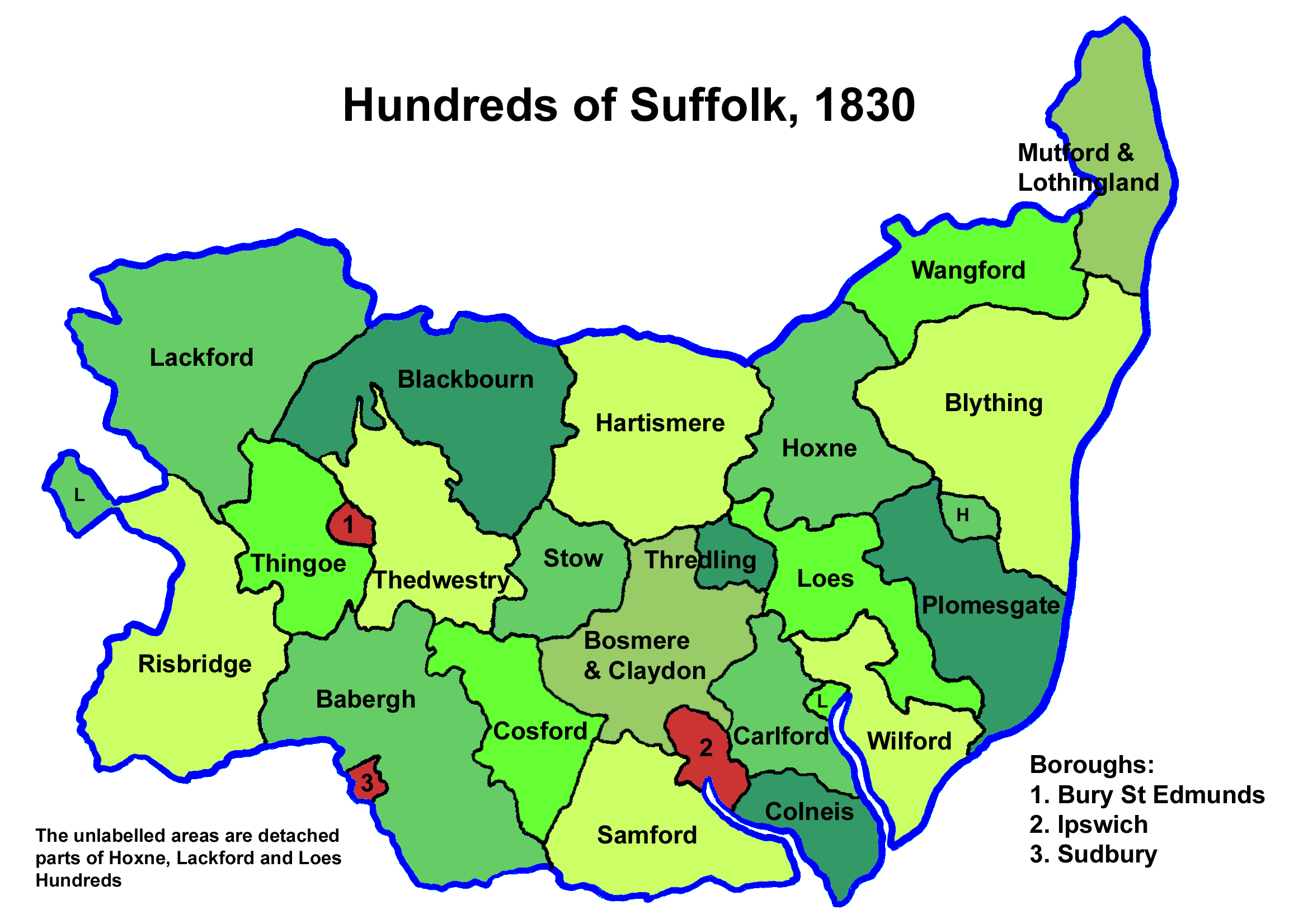
Suffolk hundreds

Bosmere and Claydon Hundred consisted of the following 33 parishes:

Parish	Area (acres)
Akenham	1,060
Ashbocking	1,383
Badley	1,050
Barham	1,800
Battisford	1,542
Baylham	1,332
Bramford	3,247
Claydon	951
Coddenham	2,719
Creeting All Saints	1,286
Creeting St Mary	1,441
Creeting St Olave	388
Crowfield	1,700
Darmsden	790
Flowton	495
Gosbeck	1,530
Great Blakenham	842
Great Bricett	916
Helmingham	2,438
Hemingstone	1,444
Henley	1,233
Little Blakenham	1,046
Mickfield	1,300
Needham Market	3,164
Nettlestead	1,029
Offton	1,530
Ringshall	2,116
Somersham	1,027
Stonham Aspal	2,399
Stonham Earl	2,521
Stonham Parva	1,173
Swilland	951
Willisham	1,030
