= Hoxne Hundred =

Historical division of Suffolk, England

Coordinates: 52.3°N 1.25°E

Hoxne Hundred with the exclave of Kelsale cum Carlton

Hoxne was a hundred of Suffolk, with an area of 55,648 acres (225.20 km^{2}).

Hoxne Hundred was a fertile district averaging about nine miles (14 km) in length and breadth. It was bounded on the north by the River Waveney which separates it from Norfolk, on the east by Wangford and Blything Hundreds, on the south by Plomesgate, Loes and Thredling Hundreds and on the west by Hartismere Hundred. The parishes of Carlton and Kelsale form a detached region to the south east of the hundred.

The area is watered by several streams flowing northward to the Waveney. On its southern side are the sources of the River Alde and near Laxfield the principal source of the River Blythe. The soil is primarily loam. The only town of any size is Stradbroke. It falls into the Deanery of Hoxne, the Archdeaconry of Suffolk, and the Diocese of Norwich.

Listed as Hoxana in the Domesday Book, the hundred owes its name to the village of Hoxne, claimed as the site of St Edmund's martyrdom.The name which in turn means "settlement of the Hoxan", believed to be a small Saxon tribe. Other information indicates that at the time of the Domesday Book, in 1086, Hoxne Hundred was also known as Bishop's Hundred. This is reinforced by the mention of a bishopric of Hoxne by Theodred, who was Bishop of London for several years before his death around 950.

== Parishes ==
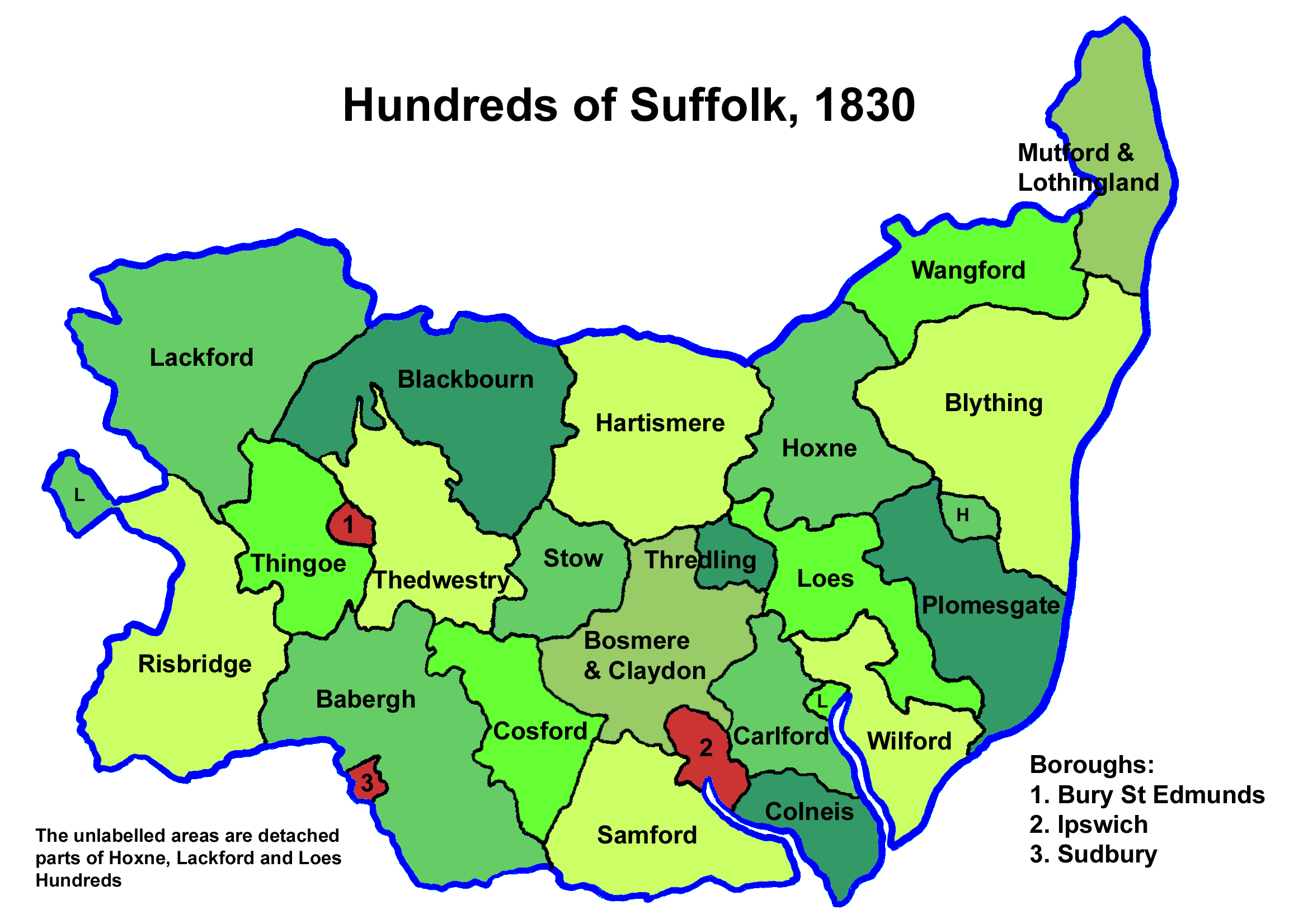
Suffolk hundreds

Hoxne Hundred was made up of the following 26 parishes:

Parish	Area (acres)
Athelington	488
Badingham	3200
Bedfield	1269
Bedingfield	1754
Brundish	2077
Carlton	548
Denham	1260
Dennington	3262
Fressingfield	4564
Horham	1434
Hoxne	4258
Kelsale	3047
Laxfield	3630
Mendham	2200
Metfield	2160
Monk Soham	1569
Saxtead	1202
Southolt	799
Stradbroke	3634
Syleham	1603
Tannington	1600
Weybread	2476
Wilby	1844
Wingfield	2443
Withersdale	880
Worlingworth	2447
