= Wilford Hundred =

Historical division of Suffolk, England

Coordinates: 52.05°N 1.39°E

Wilford Hundred

Wilford is a hundred of Suffolk, consisting of 31,500 acres (127 km^{2}).

Wilford Hundred extends about 12 miles (19 km) southward from Debach to Woodbridge and from there along the eastern banks of the River Deben to Bawdsey and Hollesley Bay in the North Sea. It covers about 8 miles (13 km) of the sea coast between the mouths of the Deben and Orford Haven and further north is wedged between Carlford and Loes Hundreds.

In the vale of the Deben between Wickham Market to Woodbridge and the sea it has some rich arable land but its central area around Sutton are sandy with open heaths. It is in the Deanery of Wilford in the Archdeaconry of Suffolk. Its only town of any size is Wickham Market. It was one of seven Saxon hundreds grouped together as the Wicklaw Hundreds.

Listed as Wileford in the Domesday Book, the exact meaning is not known but "Wili's ford" or "willow ford" are both possible.

== Parishes ==
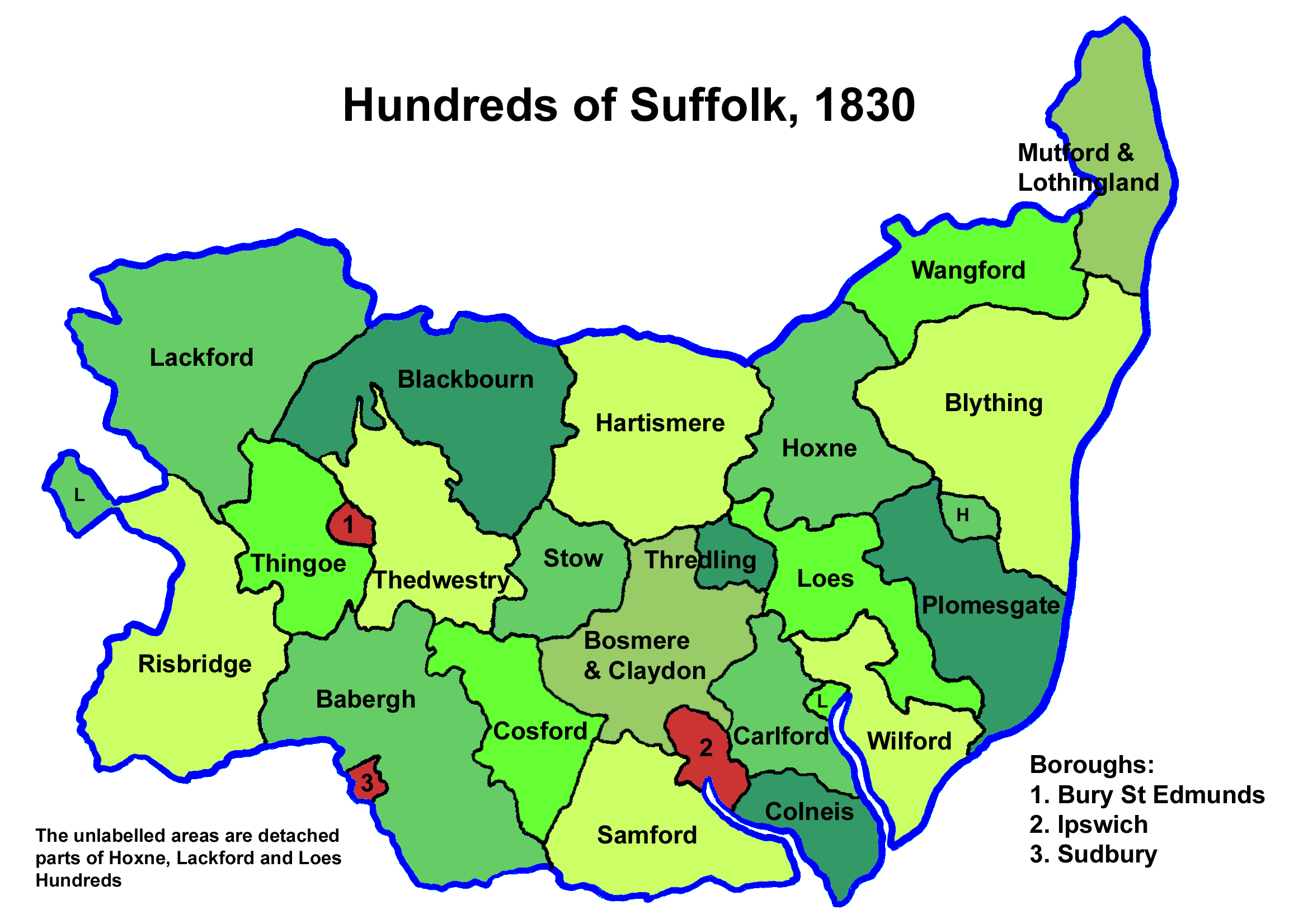
Suffolk hundreds

Wilford Hundred consists of the following 17 parishes:

| Parish | Area (acres) |
|---|---|
| Alderton | 2600 |
| Bawdsey | 2640 |
| Boulge | 545 |
| Boyton | 1890 |
| Bredfield | 1067 |
| Bromeswell | 1442 |
| Capel St Andrew | 2000 |
| Dallinghoo | 1495 |
| Debach | 500 |
| Hollesley | 2600 |
| Melton | 1408 |
| Pettistree | 1768 |
| Ramsholt | 1990 |
| Shottisham | 1033 |
| Sutton | 5789 |
| Ufford | 1555 |
| Wickham Market | 1178 |
