= Plomesgate Hundred =

Historical division of Suffolk, England

Coordinates: 52.15°N 1.5°E

Plomesgate is a hundred of Suffolk, consisting of 41,579 acres (168.26 km^{2}).

Plomesgate Hundred comprises the historic ports of Aldeburgh and Orford, the medieval market town of Saxmundham and twenty other parishes in the east of the county. It forms a strip around 14 miles long and up to 9 miles wide running south-east from near Framlingham to the North Sea. It is bounded on the east by the sea, on the north by Blything Hundred, on the west by Hoxne and Loes Hundreds and on the south by the Butley River which flows into the River Ore near Orford Ness.

The hundred is watered by the River Alde and its tributary streams and is generally a fertile loamy district with hills rising from the valleys and the coast and with sandy beaches in southern parts. It is in the Deanery of Orford in the Archdeaconry of Suffolk. It was one of seven Saxon hundreds grouped together as the Wicklaw Hundreds.

Listed as Plumesgata in the Domesday Book of 1086, the origin of the name is unknown though presumably a derivation of "Plum's gate".

== Parishes ==
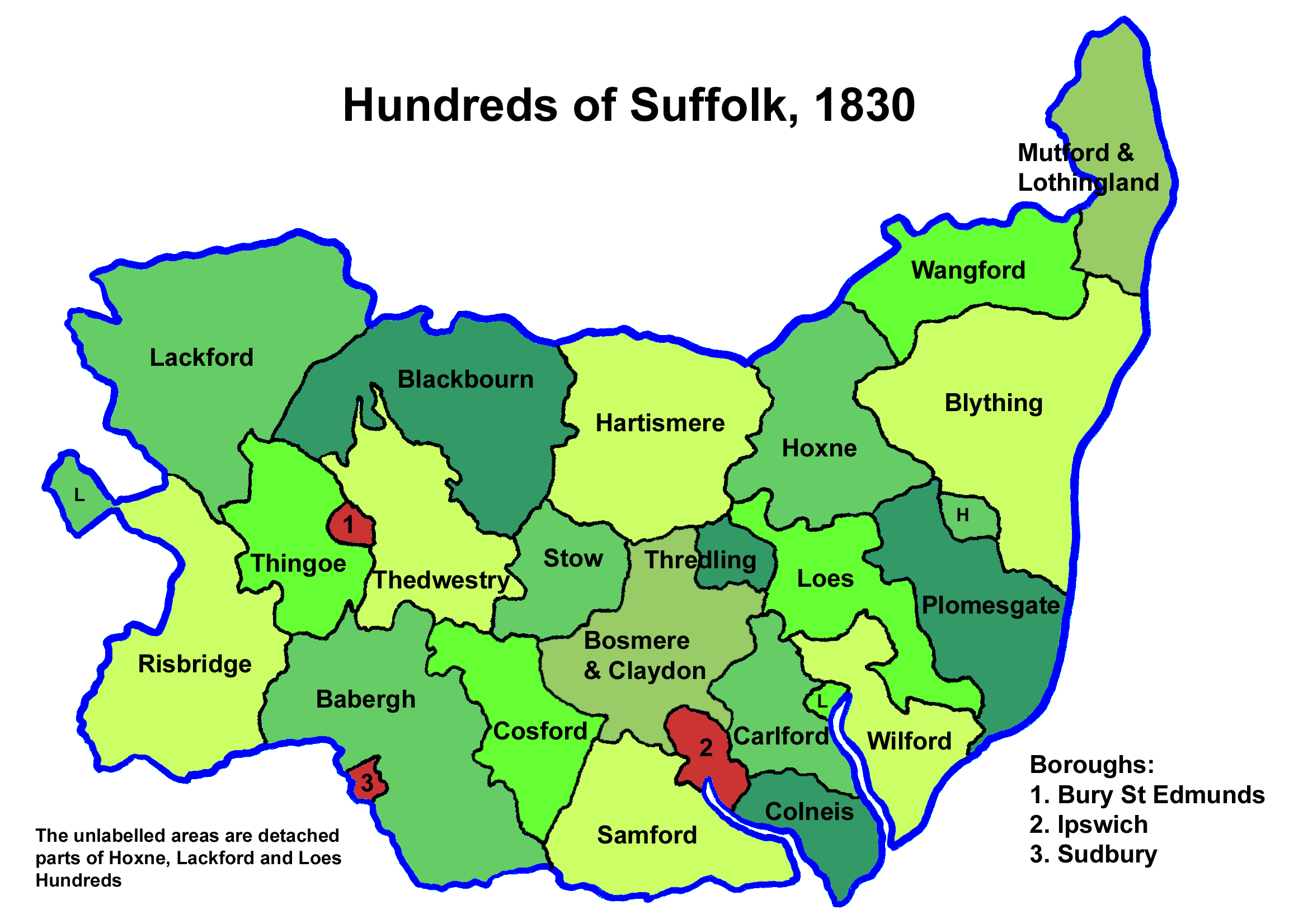
Suffolk hundreds

Plomesgate Hundred consists of the following 23 parishes:

Parish	Area (acres)
Aldeburgh	1710
Benhall	2154
Blaxhall	1975
Bruisyard	1127
Chillesford	1693
Cransford	1174
Farnham	1154
Friston	1851
Great Glemham	1801
Little Glemham	1160
Haselwood †	1897
Iken	2579
Orford	2740
Parham	1970
Rendham	1687
Saxmundham	1400
Snape	1700
Sternfield	1107
Stratford St Andrew	638
Sudbourne	5000
Swefling	1120
Tunstall	2642
Wantisden	1300

† Hamlet of Aldeburgh
