= Carlford Hundred =

Area of land in Suffolk, England

Coordinates: 52.1°N 1.24°E

Carlford Hundred

Carlford is a hundred of Suffolk, consisting of 25,461 acres (103.04 km^{2}).

Carford Hundred is of an irregular figure about ten miles (16 km) in length and from four to six miles (9.7 km) wide. It is bounded on the south by Colneis Hundred, on the east by Wilford Hundred and the River Deben, on the north by Loes Hundred and on the west by Bosmere and Claydon Hundred and the borough of Ipswich. It falls in the Deanery of Carlford, and in the Archdeaconry of Suffolk.

The southern part of the hundred running from the bounds of Ipswich to Woodbridge and the River Deben has generally a light sandy soil, whereas in its northern parts a rich loam prevails.

Listed as Carleford in the Domesday Book of 1086, the name has the structure "carla ford", meaning "ford of the churls (peasants)". It was one of seven Saxon hundreds grouped together as the Wicklaw Hundreds.

Greenwich, Ipswich was listed as "Grenewic", which means a “green farmstead”, was listed as being in Carlford Hundred in the Domesday Book, but was subsequently integrated into Ipswich as part of St Clement's Parish.

== Parishes ==
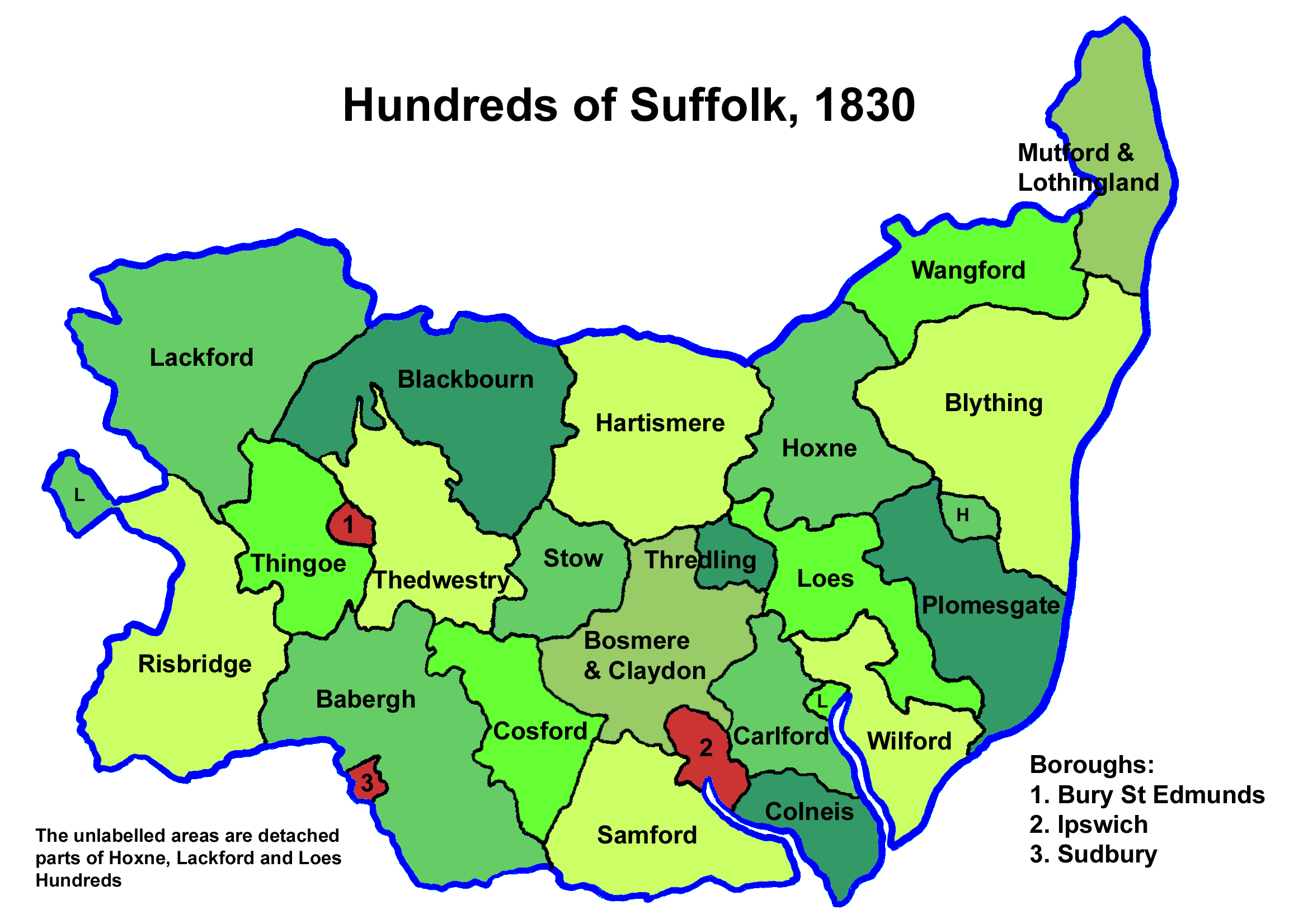
Suffolk Hundreds

Carlford Hundred consists of the following 18 parishes:

Parish	Area (acres)
Brightwell	510
Burgh	1200
Clopton	2034
Culpho	704
Foxhall	1060
Great Bealings	1100
Grundisburgh	1897
Hasketon	1600
Kesgrave	1610
Little Bealings	755
Martlesham	2558
Newbourn	840
Otley	2157
Playford	650
Rushmere	2720
Tuddenham St Martin	1232
Waldringfield	834
Witnesham	2000
