= Loes Hundred =

Historical division of Suffolk, England

Coordinates: 52.22°N 1.34°E

Loes Hundred including the exclaves Butley, Kenton, and Woodbridge

Loes was a hundred of Suffolk, with an area of 31,321 acres (126.75 km^{2}).

Loes Hundred was long and thin in shape, around 15 miles (24 km) long and between 2 and 6 miles (9.7 km) wide. It followed the course of the River Deben from Cretingham to Ufford where it crossed Wilford Hundred to Woodbridge where it widened considerably. The town and port of Woodbridge fell within the hundred but was detached from the main part by about three miles (5 km). Loes was bounded on the east by Plomesgate Hundred, on the north by Hoxne Hundred, and on the west and south west by Thredling, Carlford and Wilford Hundreds. It was one of seven Saxon hundreds grouped together as the Wicklaw Hundreds.

The area is a picturesque district of hill and valley watered by the Deben, the River Ore and their tributary streams, and the loamy soil is well suited to barley, wheat and beans.

Listed as Losa in the Domesday Book, the name "Loes" probably indicates that it was originally owned by a man named Hlossa.

== Parishes ==
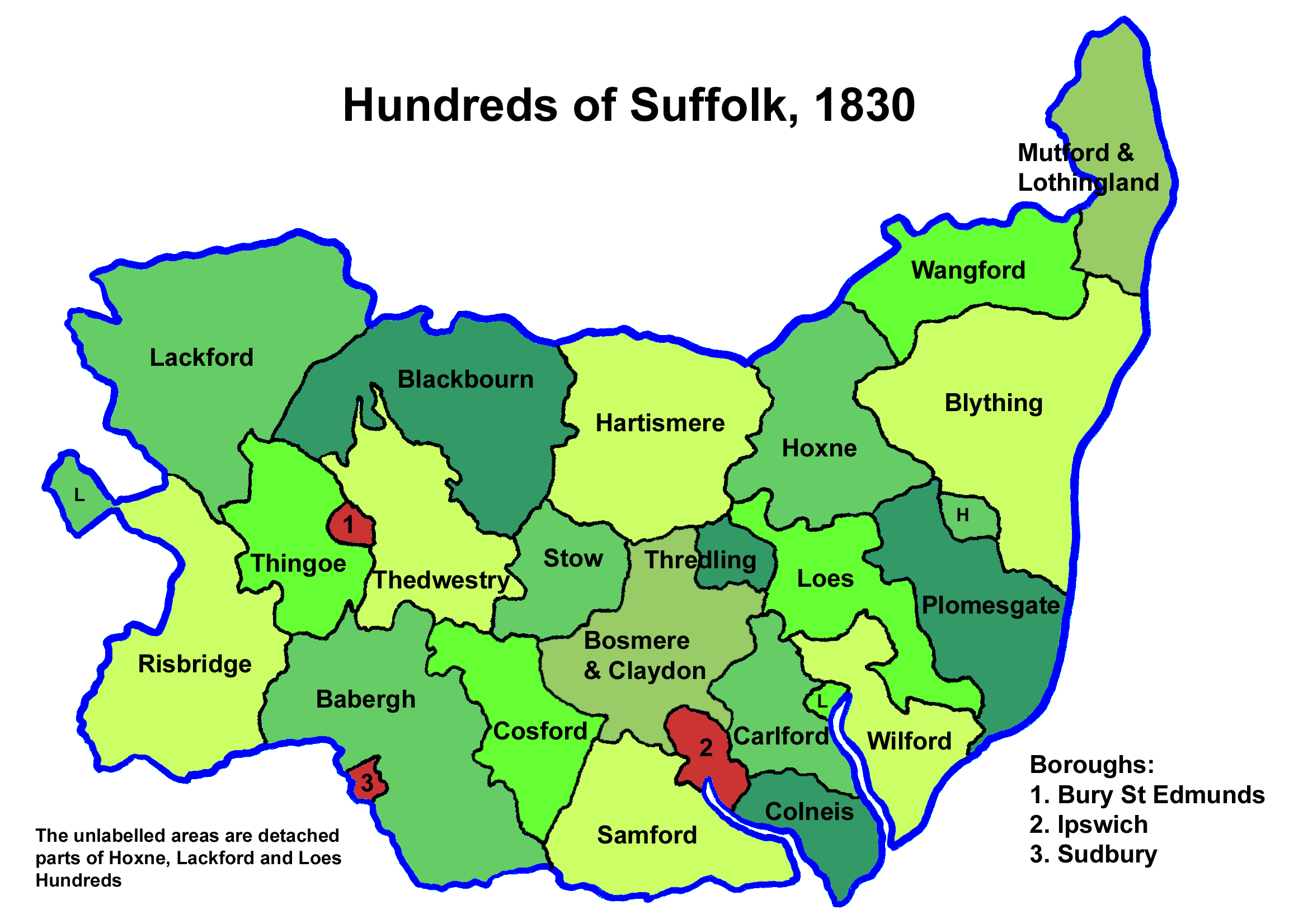
Suffolk hundreds

Loes Hundred consisted of the following 18 parishes:

Parish	Area (acres)
Brandeston	1196
Butley	2000
Campsey Ash	1814
Charsfield	1290
Cretingham	1639
Earl Soham	1945
Easton	1462
Eyke	2800
Hacheston	1727
Framlingham	4528
Hoo	1164
Kenton	1210
Kettleburgh	1400
Letheringham	1100
Marlesford	1268
Monewden	1063
Rendlesham	2065
Woodbridge	1650

The parishes of Woodbridge and Kenton are in a detached section of the hundred, which also includes small parts of Bredfield and Dallinghoo that are predominantly in Wilford Hundred.
