= Colneis Hundred =

Historical division of Suffolk, England

Coordinates: 52.0°N 1.3°E

Colneis Hundred

Colneis is a hundred of Suffolk, covering 16,712 acres (67.63 km^{2}).

Running from the south-east outskirts of Ipswich to the North Sea coast, the hundred is made up of the land between the estuaries of the rivers Orwell and Deben. It is one of the smallest in Suffolk, being only about four miles (6.4 km) wide and ten miles (16 km) long between its border with Carlford Hundred and the cliffs at Felixstowe. It lies within the Colneis Deanery, in the Archdeaconry of Suffolk. It was one of seven Saxon hundreds grouped together as the Wicklaw Hundreds.

Spelled Colenesse in Domesday Book, the origin of the name is not known for sure, though the suffix -ness means "headland", and t Col may represent the Old Danish personal name Koli

The name survives as that of a Junior School in Felixstowe.

== Parishes ==
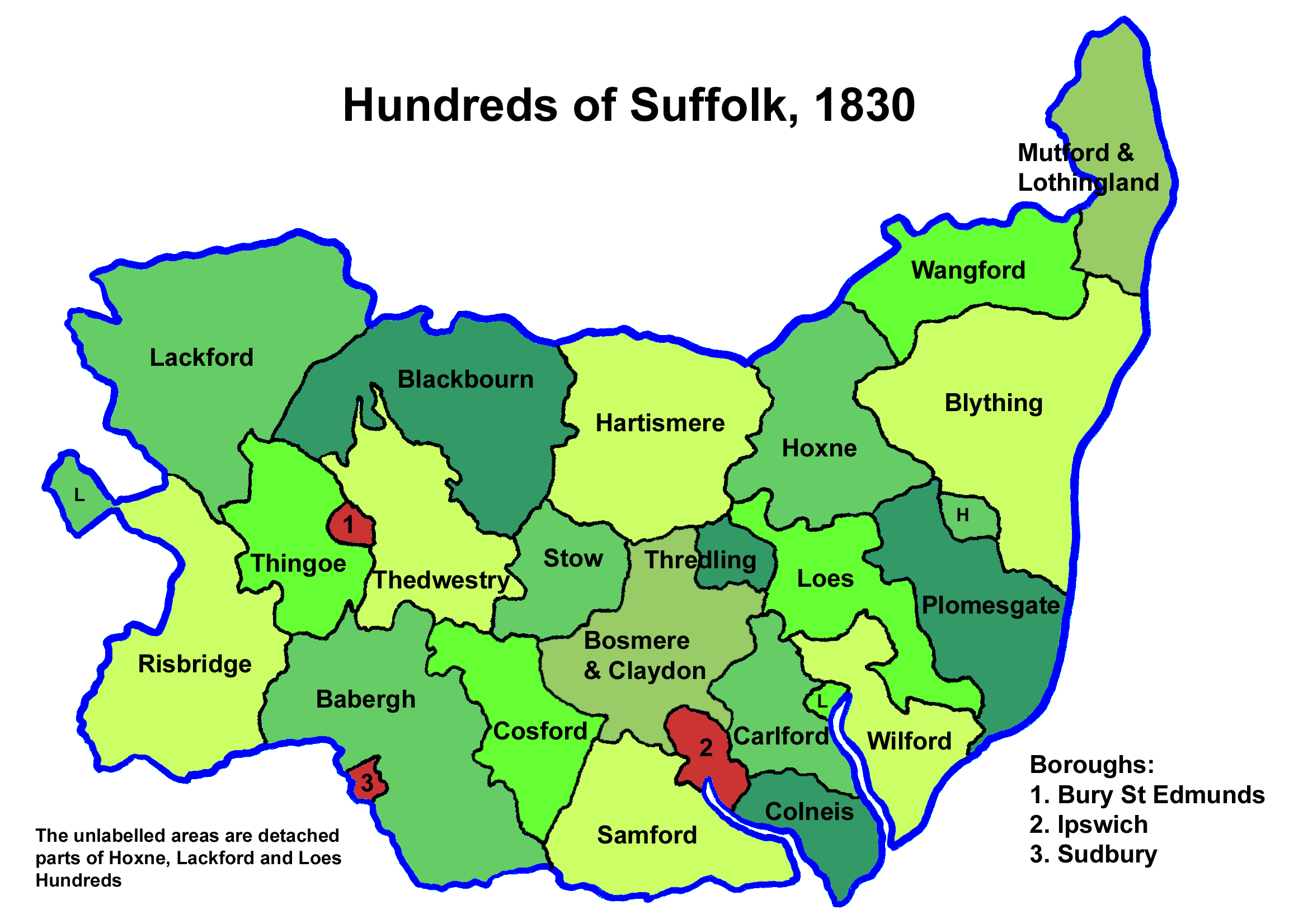
Suffolk Hundreds

Colneis Hundred consists of the following 10 parishes:

Parish	Area (acres)
Bucklesham	1800
Falkenham	1550
Felixstowe	1170
Hemley	1155
Kirton	1929
Levington	1660
Nacton	2380
Trimley St Martin	1200
Trimley St Mary	1868
Walton	2000
