= Diocese of St Edmundsbury and Ipswich =

Diocese of the Church of England

Coordinates: 52.2439°N 0.7168°E

Diocese of St Edmundsbury and Ipswich Dioecesis Sancti Edmundi et Gippisvicensis
- Coat of arms

Location
- Ecclesiastical province: Canterbury
- Archdeaconries: Sudbury, Suffolk, Ipswich

Statistics
- Parishes: 446
- Churches: 482

Information
- Cathedral: St Edmundsbury Cathedral
- Language: English

Current leadership
- Bishop: Joanne Grenfell, Bishop of St Edmundsbury and Ipswich
- Suffragan: Bishop of Dunwich (vacant)
- Dean: Joseph Hawes, Dean of St Edmundsbury
- Archdeacons: David Jenkins, Archdeacon of Sudbury; Sally Gaze, Archdeacon for Rural Mission; Rich Henderson, Archdeacon of Suffolk; Samuel Brazier-Gibbs, Archdeacon of Ipswich

Website
- cofesuffolk.org

The Diocese of St Edmundsbury and Ipswich is a Church of England diocese based in Ipswich, covering Suffolk (excluding Lowestoft). The cathedral is St Edmundsbury Cathedral, and the bishop is the Bishop of St Edmundsbury and Ipswich. It is part of the Province of Canterbury.

The diocese was formed on 23 January 1914 from parts of the Diocese of Norwich and the Diocese of Ely.

Though the diocesan offices, the bishops' offices and residences are all in Ipswich – only the cathedral (and its offices) are in Bury St Edmunds – the diocese is nonetheless often referred to as St Edmundsbury diocese. Both the diocese and the diocesan bishop are commonly called "(St) Eds and Ips."

== Bishops ==
Alongside the diocesan Bishop of St Edmundsbury and Ipswich (Joanne Grenfell), the Diocese has one suffragan bishop: the Bishop suffragan of Dunwich (vacant since 2024). There are also some retired bishops living in the diocese who are licensed as honorary assistant bishops:

- 2008–present: Gavin Reid, former Bishop of Maidstone, lives in Beccles.
- 2008–present: Jeremy Walsh, retired Bishop suffragan of Tewkesbury, lives in Martlesham.
- 2012–present: Retired Dean of St Paul's and former Bishop of Sodor and Man Graeme Knowles lives in Bury St Edmunds (and is also licensed in neighbouring Ely diocese.)
- 2012–present: Former vicar of HTB Sandy Millar lives in Aldeburgh and is also an honorary assistant bishop in London.
- 2015–present: Tim Stevens. retired Bishop of Leicester and former Bishop of Dunwich.

Alternative episcopal oversight (for parishes in the diocese which reject the ministry of priests who are women) is provided by the provincial episcopal visitor, Norman Banks, Bishop suffragan of Richborough, who is licensed as an honorary assistant bishop of the diocese in order to facilitate his work there.

== Archdeaconries and deaneries ==
The Archdeacon of Ipswich now only has oversight of the Deanery of Ipswich and Inspiring Ipswich mission project.

| Diocese | Archdeaconries | Rural Deaneries | Paid clergy | Churches | Population | People/clergy | People/church | Churches/clergy |
|---|---|---|---|---|---|---|---|---|
| Diocese of St Edmundsbury & Ipswich | Archdeaconry of Ipswich | Deanery of Bosmere | 6 | 24 | 21,948 | 3,658 | 915 | 4 |
| Diocese of St Edmundsbury & Ipswich | Archdeaconry of Ipswich | Deanery of Colneys | 7 | 21 | 38,615 | 4,827 | 1,839 | 2.63 |
| Diocese of St Edmundsbury & Ipswich | Archdeaconry of Ipswich | Deanery of Hadleigh | 4 | 23 | 18,765 | 4,691 | 816 | 5.75 |
| Diocese of St Edmundsbury & Ipswich | Archdeaconry of Ipswich | Deanery of Ipswich | 22 | 25 | 161,868 | 7,358 | 6,475 | 1.14 |
| Diocese of St Edmundsbury & Ipswich | Archdeaconry of Ipswich | Deanery of Samford | 3 | 19 | 20,084 | 6,695 | 1,057 | 6.33 |
| Diocese of St Edmundsbury & Ipswich | Archdeaconry of Ipswich | Deanery of Stowmarket | 5 | 18 | 31,761 | 6,352 | 1,765 | 3.6 |
| Diocese of St Edmundsbury & Ipswich | Archdeaconry of Ipswich | Deanery of Woodbridge | 8 | 35 | 25,128 | 3,141 | 718 | 4.38 |
| Diocese of St Edmundsbury & Ipswich | Archdeaconry of Sudbury | Deanery of Clare | 4 | 29 | 41,514 | 10,379 | 1,432 | 7.25 |
| Diocese of St Edmundsbury & Ipswich | Archdeaconry of Sudbury | Deanery of Ixworth | 5 | 31 | 19,666 | 3,933 | 634 | 6.2 |
| Diocese of St Edmundsbury & Ipswich | Archdeaconry of Sudbury | Deanery of Lavenham | 10 | 30 | 19,074 | 1,907 | 636 | 3 |
| Diocese of St Edmundsbury & Ipswich | Archdeaconry of Sudbury | Deanery of Mildenhall | 8 | 26 | 61,335 | 7,667 | 2,359 | 3.25 |
| Diocese of St Edmundsbury & Ipswich | Archdeaconry of Sudbury | Deanery of Sudbury | 8 | 22 | 39,268 | 4,909 | 1,785 | 2.75 |
| Diocese of St Edmundsbury & Ipswich | Archdeaconry of Sudbury | Deanery of Thingoe | 10* | 25* | 54,898* | 5,490 | 2,196 | 2.5 |
| Diocese of St Edmundsbury & Ipswich | Archdeaconry of Suffolk | Deanery of Hartismere | 4 | 21 | 12,294 | 3,074 | 585 | 5.25 |
| Diocese of St Edmundsbury & Ipswich | Archdeaconry of Suffolk | Deanery of Hoxne | 5 | 21 | 8,828 | 1,766 | 420 | 4.2 |
| Diocese of St Edmundsbury & Ipswich | Archdeaconry of Suffolk | Deanery of Loes | 7 | 32 | 17,492 | 2,499 | 547 | 4.57 |
| Diocese of St Edmundsbury & Ipswich | Archdeaconry of Suffolk | Deanery of Saxmundham | 5 | 23 | 19,611 | 3,922 | 853 | 4.6 |
| Diocese of St Edmundsbury & Ipswich | Archdeaconry of Suffolk | Deanery of Waveney & Blyth | 12 | 54 | 39,614 | 3,301 | 734 | 4.5 |
| Total/average | | | 134 | 479 | 651,763 | 4,864 | 1,361 | 3.57 |

*including Cathedral

=== Archdeacon for Rural Mission ===
On 11 January 2019, it was announced that Sally Gaze, the Diocese's "Dean of Rural Mission Consultancy" since 2017, would become "Archdeacon for Rural Mission". She was collated archdeacon and installed a Diocesan Canon Residentiary of St Edmundsbury Cathedral on 10 February 2019; the post is new and has no territorial archdeaconry attached.

== List of churches ==
=== Not in a deanery ===
| Benefice | Churches | Link | Clergy | Population served | Ref |
|---|---|---|---|---|---|
| Cathedral | Cathedral of St James & Edmund, Bury St Edmunds | | Dean: Joe Hawes; Canon: Philip Banks; Canon: Matthew Vernon | 409 | |

=== Deanery of Bosmere ===
| Benefice | Churches | Link | Clergy | Population served | Ref |
|---|---|---|---|---|---|
| Blakenham, Great (St Mary) and Little (St Mary) with Baylham and Nettlestead | St Mary, Little Blakenham; St Peter, Baylham; St Mary, Nettlestead | | Curate: Carl Melville; Curate (Blakenham etc): Julian Fennell | 5,488 | |
| Blakenham, Great (St Mary) and Little (St Mary) with Baylham and Nettlestead | St Mary, Great Blakenham | | Curate: Carl Melville; Curate (Blakenham etc): Julian Fennell | 5,488 | |
| Claydon (No Church) and Barham | St Mary and St Peter, Barham | | Curate: Carl Melville; Curate (Blakenham etc): Julian Fennell | 5,488 | |
| Coddenham (St Mary) with Gosbeck and Hemingstone with Henley | St Peter, Henley | | Priest-in-Charge: Philip Payne; Curate (Coddenham): Carl Melville (see above); NSM (Coddenham, Crowfield): Helen Norris; NSM (Coddenham): Catherine Austin | 4,958 | |
| Coddenham (St Mary) with Gosbeck and Hemingstone with Henley | St Mary, Coddenham; St Mary, Gosbeck; St Gregory, Hemingstone | | Priest-in-Charge: Philip Payne; Curate (Coddenham): Carl Melville (see above); NSM (Coddenham, Crowfield): Helen Norris; NSM (Coddenham): Catherine Austin | 4,958 | |
| Creeting St Mary (St Mary), Creeting St Peter and Earl Stonham with Stonham Parva | St Mary, Creeting St Mary; St Peter, Creeting St Peter; St Mary, Earl Stonham | | Priest-in-Charge: Philip Payne; Curate (Coddenham): Carl Melville (see above); NSM (Coddenham, Crowfield): Helen Norris; NSM (Coddenham): Catherine Austin | 4,958 | |
| Crowfield (All Saints) with Stonham Aspal and Mickfield | All Saints, Crowfield; SS Mary & Lambert, Stonham Aspal | | Priest-in-Charge: Philip Payne; Curate (Coddenham): Carl Melville (see above); NSM (Coddenham, Crowfield): Helen Norris; NSM (Coddenham): Catherine Austin | 4,958 | |
| Bramford (St Mary the Virgin) | St Mary the Virgin, Bramford | | Priest-in-Charge: Jennifer Seggar; Curate: Julian Fennell (see above) | 2,370 | |
| Needham Market (St John the Baptist) with Badley | St John the Baptist, Needham Market | | Priest-in-Charge: Diane Williams | 4,542 | |
| Ringshall (St Catherine) with Battisford, Barking with Darmsden and Great Bricett | St Catherine, Ringshall; St Mary, Barking; St Mary, Battisford; SS Mary & Lawrence, Great Bricett | | Priest-in-Charge: David Harrison | 4,590 | |
| Somersham (St Mary) with Flowton and Offton with Willisham | St Mary, Somersham; St Mary, Flowton; St Mary, Offton; St Mary, Willisham | | Priest-in-Charge: David Harrison | 4,590 | |

=== Deanery of Colneys ===
| Benefice | Churches | Link | Clergy | Population served | Ref |
|---|---|---|---|---|---|
| Felixstowe (Christ Church) | Christ Church Felixstowe (1989) | | Vicar: Vacant | 5,797 | |
| Felixstowe (St John the Baptist with St Edmund) | St John the Baptist, Felixstowe; St Edmund, Felixstowe | | Vicar: Andrew Dotchin; NSM: Penny Brinkley; Associate Priest Elizabeth Corker; Associate Priest Philip Young; Associate Priest Derick Brown; Associate Priest Catherine Bond; Associate Priest Jane Pearse | 4,347 | |
| Felixstowe (St Peter and St Paul) (St Andrew) (St Nicholas) | SS Peter & Paul, Felixstowe; St Andrew, Felixstowe; St Nicholas, Felixstowe | | Vicar: Chris Hood | 7,369 | |
| Martlesham (St Mary the Virgin) with Brightwell | St Mary the Virgin, Martlesham; St Michael & All Angels, Martlesham Heath; St John the Baptist, Brightwell | | Priest-in-Charge: Toby Tate; Curate: Christine Pinder; NSM: Margaret Rittman | 5,598 | |
| Nacton (St Martin) and Levington with Bucklesham and Foxhall with Kirton and Falkenham | St Martin, Nacton; St Mary, Bucklesham; St Ethelbert, Falkenham; SS Mary & Martin, Kirton; St Peter, Levington | | Priest-in-Charge: Ian Wilson; Curate: Sarah Jenkins | 3,716 | |
| Waldringfield (All Saints) with Hemley and Newbourne | All Saints, Waldringfield; All Saints, Hemley; St Mary the Virgin, Newbourne | | Priest-in-Charge: Ian Wilson; Curate: Sarah Jenkins | 3,716 | |
| Walton (St Mary) (St Philip) and Trimley | St Mary the Virgin, Walton; St Philip, Felixstowe | | Rector: Caroline Allen; Curate: Charlotte Cook; NSM: Wendy Smith | 11,788 | |
| Walton (St Mary) (St Philip) and Trimley | St Martin, Trimley St Martin | | Rector: Caroline Allen; Curate: Charlotte Cook; NSM: Wendy Smith | 11,788 | |
| Walton (St Mary) (St Philip) and Trimley | St Mary the Virgin, Trimley St Mary | | Rector: Caroline Allen; Curate: Charlotte Cook; NSM: Wendy Smith | 11,788 | |

=== Deanery of Hadleigh ===
| Benefice | Churches | Link | Clergy | Population served | Ref |
|---|---|---|---|---|---|
| Bildeston (St Mary Magdalene) with Wattisham and Lindsey, Whatfield with Semer, Nedging and Naughton | St Mary Magdalene, Bildeston; St Peter, Lindsey; St Mary, Naughton; St Mary, Nedging; All Saints, Semer; St Margaret, Whatfield | | Hon. Curate: Vacant | 2,214 | |
| Elmsett (St Peter) with Aldham, Hintlesham, Chattisham and Kersey | St Peter, Elmsett; St Mary, Aldham; All Saints & St Margaret, Chattisham; St Nicholas, Hintlesham; St Mary, Kersey | | Priest-in-Charge: Simon Battersby | 2,094 | |
| Hadleigh (St Mary), Layham and Shelley | St Mary, Hadleigh; St Andrew, Layham; All Saints, Shelley | | Vicar: Jo Delfgou; Curate: Susan Foster; NSM: Simon White | 8,938 | |
| Higham (St Mary), Holton St Mary, Raydon and Stratford St Mary | St Mary, Higham; St Mary, Holton St Mary; St Mary, Raydon; St Mary, Stratford St Mary | | Rector: Rosalind Paul | 1,562 | |
| Nayland (St James) with Wiston | St James, Nayland; St Mary the Virgin, Wissington | | Rector: Stéphane Javelle | 3,957 | |
| Stoke By Nayland (St Mary) with Leavenheath and Polstead | St Mary, Stoke-by-Nayland; St Mary, Polstead; St Matthew, Leavenheath | | Rector: Stéphane Javelle | 3,957 | |

=== Deanery of Ipswich ===
| Benefice | Churches | Link | Clergy | Population served | Ref |
|---|---|---|---|---|---|
| River Church Ipswich (BMO) | River Church Ipswich | | Church Leader: Amy Key Church Leader: Matt Key | N/A | |
| Ipswich (All Hallows) | All Hallows, Ipswich | | Priest-in-Charge: Emma Haggar | 12,311 | |
| MIE (Mission Ipswich East) | St Andrew, Ipswich; St John the Baptist, Ipswich; Bixley Hall | | Priest-in-Charge: Mark Prentice; NSM: Jagit Bachu | 19,163 | |
| Ipswich (St Augustine of Hippo) | St Augustine of Hippo, Ipswich | | Vicar: Trevor Golding; NSM: Ian Daniels; Curate Amy Key | 11,213 | |
| Ipswich (St Bartholomew) | St Bartholomew, Ipswich | | Vicar: Paul Carter | 4,375 | |
| Ipswich (St Helen) (Holy Trinity) (St Clement with St Luke) | Holy Trinity, Ipswich; St Helen's, Ipswich; St Luke, Ipswich | | Priest-in-Charge: Tom Rout | 12,107 | |
| Ipswich (St Margaret) | St Margaret, Ipswich | | Vicar: | 7,556 | |
| St Mary's At Stoke | St Mary at Stoke, Ipswich | | Priest in Charge: Sophie Cowan; Associate Priest: Kay Palmer | | |
| Ipswich (St Peter) | St Peter, Ipswich. | | Priest-in-Charge: Emily Swinerd Associate priest: Mervyn Dye | | |
| Ipswich (St Francis, with St Clare) | St Francis, Ipswich. | | Priest-in-Charge: Heather Livingstone Associate Minister: David Cutts | | |
| Ipswich (St Mary At the Elms) | St Mary at the Elms, Ipswich | | Priest-in-Charge: John Thackray | 268 | |
| Ipswich (St Mary-Le-Tower) (St Nicholas) | Ipswich Minster | | Vicar: Tom Mumford; Associate Priest: Pippa Scott; Assistant Curate: Gregor Purdie | 1,256 | |
| Ipswich (St Thomas) | St Thomas, Ipswich | | Priest-in-Charge: Rachel Revely | 10,701 | |
| Kesgrave (All Saints) | All Saints, Kesgrave | | Vicar: Robin Spittle; Curate: Gary Jones; NSM: Paul Darbyshire | 14,134 | |
| Rushmere (St Andrew) | St Andrew, Rushmere | | Vicar: Caroline Wilson | 7,301 | |
| Triangle (All Saints) (St Matthew) (Community Centre) Ipswich | Triangle Church, Ipswich; St Matthew, Ipswich; All Saints, Ipswich | | Rector: Nicholas Atkins; Curate: Daniel Morrison; Curate: Andrew Buttress; Curate: Lawrence Carey; NSM: Ruth Best | 15,684 | |
| Westerfield (St Mary Magdalene) and Tuddenham with Witnesham | St Mary Magdalene, Westerfield; St Martin, Tuddenham; St Mary, Witnesham | | Priest-in-Charge: Charlotte Cook; NSM: Simon Ramacci | 1,650 | |
| Whitton (St Mary and St Botolph) and Thurleston with Akenham | SS Mary & Botolph, Whitton; Ascension, Castle Hill | | Priest-in-Charge: Mary Sofanovic; Curate: Eric Falla | 12,753 | |

=== Deanery of Samford ===
| Benefice | Churches | Link | Clergy | Population served | Ref |
|---|---|---|---|---|---|
| Constable Country Benefice | St Mary, Bentley; St Mary the Virgin, East Bergholt; St Michael the Archangel, Brantham; St Mary the Virgin, Tattingstone | Constable Country Churches | Rector Designate: Christopher Willis | 5,315 | |
| The Benefice Capel St Mary with Little Wenham and Great Wenham | St Mary, Capel St Mary; St John, Great Wenham; All Saints, Little Wenham (redundant) | The Benefice of Capel St Mary with Little Wenham and Great Wenham | Rector: Sally Letman | 3,034 | |
| Two Rivers Benefice | All Saints, Holbrook; St Peter, Freston; St Peter, Stutton; St Mary, Wherstead; St Michael & All Angels, Woolverstone | Two Rivers Benefice | Rector: Jenny Seggar | 3,728 | |
| The Shoreline Benefice | St Andrew, Chelmondiston; St Mary the Virgin, Erwarton; St Mary, Harkstead; St Mary, Shotley | The Shoreline Benefice | Rector: Liesbeth Oosterhof | 3,809 | |
| North Samford Benefice | St Mary the Virgin, Belstead; St Mary the Virgin, Burstall; St Peter with St Mary, Copdock with Washbrook; All Saints, Sproughton | North Samford Benefice | Rector: Tony Wilcox | 4,198 | |

=== Deanery of Stowmarket ===
| Benefice | Churches | Link | Clergy | Population served | Ref |
|---|---|---|---|---|---|
| Bacton (St Mary the Virgin) with Wyverstone, Cotton and Old Newton, and Wickham Skeith | St Mary the Virgin, Bacton; St Andrew, Cotton; St Nicholas' Chapel, Gipping; St Mary, Old Newton; St Andrew, Wickham Skeith; St George, Wyverstone | | Priest-in-Charge: Val White; NSM: David White | 3,675 | |
| Combs (St Mary) and Little Finborough | St Mary, Combs | | Priest-in-Charge: Christopher Childs; Hon. Curate: Pauline Higham | 8,206 | |
| Combs (St Mary) and Little Finborough | St Mary, Little Finborough | | Priest-in-Charge: Christopher Childs; Hon. Curate: Pauline Higham | 8,206 | |
| Finborough, Great (St Andrew) with Onehouse, Harleston, Buxhall and Shelland | St Andrew, Great Finborough | | Priest-in-Charge: Christopher Childs; Hon. Curate: Pauline Higham | 8,206 | |
| Finborough, Great (St Andrew) with Onehouse, Harleston, Buxhall and Shelland | St Mary, Buxhall; St Augustine of Canterbury, Harleston; St John the Baptist, Onehouse; King Charles the Martyr, Shelland | | Priest-in-Charge: Christopher Childs; Hon. Curate: Pauline Higham | 8,206 | |
| Haughley (St Mary the Virgin) with Wetherden and Stowupland | Assumption of the Blessed Virgin Mary, Haughley; Holy Trinity, Stowupland; St Mary the Virgin, Wetherden | | Priest-in-Charge: Brin Singleton | 4,181 | |
| Mendlesham (St Mary) | St Mary, Mendlesham | | Vicar: Philip Gray | 1,411 | |
| Stowmarket (St Peter and St Mary) | SS Peter & Mary, Stowmarket | | Vicar: Michael Eden; NSM: Richard Stretch | 14,288 | |

=== Deanery of Woodbridge ===
| Benefice | Churches | Link | Clergy | Population served | Ref |
|---|---|---|---|---|---|
| Bealings, Great (St Mary) and Little (All Saints) with Playford and Culpho | St Mary, Great Bealings; All Saints, Little Bealings; St Botolph, Culpho; St Mary, Playford | | Priest-in-Charge: Celia Cook | 997 | |
| Carlford, Comprising Ashbocking, Boulge, Burgh, Clopton, Grundisburgh, Hasketon, Otley, and Swilland | All Saints, Ashbocking; St Michael, Boulge; St Botolph, Burgh; St Mary the Virgin, Clopton; St Mary the Virgin, Grundisburgh; St Andrew, Hasketon; St Mary, Otley; St Mary, Swilland | | Rector: Clare Sanders | 3,709 | |
| Melton (St Andrew) and Ufford | St Andrew the Apostle, Melton | | Rector: Paul Hambling; Hon. Curate: Penny Brown | 5,177 | |
| Melton (St Andrew) and Ufford | Assumption of the Blessed Virgin Mary, Ufford | | Rector: Paul Hambling; Hon. Curate: Penny Brown | 5,177 | |
| Wilford Peninsula, The, Comprising Alderton, Bawdsey, Boyton, Bromeswell, Butley, Chillesford, Eyke, Hollesley, Iken, Orford, Ramsholt, Rendlesham, Shottisham, Sudbourne, Sutton, Tunstall, and Wantisden | All Saints, Ramsholt | | Team Rector: Dave Murdoch; Team Vicar: Ruth Hatchett | 7,682 | |
| Wilford Peninsula, The, Comprising Alderton, Bawdsey, Boyton, Bromeswell, Butley, Chillesford, Eyke, Hollesley, Iken, Orford, Ramsholt, Rendlesham, Shottisham, Sudbourne, Sutton, Tunstall, and Wantisden | St Gregory the Great, Rendlesham; St Felix of Dunwich, Rendlesham | | Team Rector: Dave Murdoch; Team Vicar: Ruth Hatchett | 7,682 | |
| Wilford Peninsula, The, Comprising Alderton, Bawdsey, Boyton, Bromeswell, Butley, Chillesford, Eyke, Hollesley, Iken, Orford, Ramsholt, Rendlesham, Shottisham, Sudbourne, Sutton, Tunstall, and Wantisden | St Andrew, Alderton; St Mary the Virgin, Bawdsey; St Andrew, Boyton; St Edmund, Bromeswell; St John the Baptist, Butley; St Peter, Chillesford; All Saints, Eyke; All Saints, Hollesley; St Botolph, Iken; St Bartholomew, Orford; St Margaret of Antioch, Shottisham; All Saints, Sudbourne; All Saints, Sutton; St Michael & All Angels, Tunstall; St John the Baptist, Wantisden | | Team Rector: Dave Murdoch; Team Vicar: Ruth Hatchett | 7,682 | |
| Woodbridge (St John the Evangelist) and Bredfield | St John the Evangelist, Woodbridge; St Andrew, Bredfield | | Vicar: Clive Howard; Curate: Bill Herbert; NSM: Martin Roberts | 2,002 | |
| Woodbridge (St Mary the Virgin) | St Mary the Virgin, Woodbridge | | Rector: Kevan McCormack; NSM: Michael Hare | 5,561 | |

=== Deanery of Clare ===
| Benefice | Churches | Link | Clergy | Population served | Ref |
|---|---|---|---|---|---|
| Bansfield, Comprising Cowlinge, Denston, Lidgate, Ousden, Stansfield, Stradishall, and Wickhambrook | St Margaret of Antioch, Cowlinge; St Nicholas, Denston; St Mary, Lidgate; St Peter, Ousden; All Saints, Stansfield; St Margaret, Stradishall; All Saints, Wickhambrook | | Rector: Eve Bell | 3,037 | |
| Chevington (All Saints) with Hargrave, Chedburgh with Depden, Rede and Hawkedon | All Saints, Chevington; All Saints, Chedburgh; St Mary the Virgin, Depden; St Edmund King & Martyr, Hargrave; St Mary, Hawkedon; All Saints, Rede | | Rector: Simon Hill | 1,944 | |
| Haverhill (St Mary the Virgin) with Withersfield | St Mary the Virgin, Haverhill; St Mary the Virgin, Withersfield | | Priest-in-Charge: Max Drinkwater | 27,343 | |
| Stour Valley, The, Comprising Cavendish, Clare with Poslingford, Hundon, Stoke-By-Clare, and Wixoe | St Mary the Virgin, Cavendish; SS Peter & Paul, Clare; St Mary, Poslingford; All Saints, Hundon; St John the Baptist, Stoke by Clare; St Leonard, Wixoe | | Rector: Mark Woodrow | 5,789 | |
| Stourhead, Comprising Barnardiston, Great Bradley, Great Thurlow, Great Wratting, Hundon, Kedington, Little Bradley, Little Thurlow, and Little Wratting | All Saints, Barnardiston; St Mary the Virgin, Great Bradley; All Saints, Great Thurlow; St Mary, Great Wratting; SS Peter & Paul, Kedington; All Saints, Little Bradley; St Peter, Little Thurlow; St Mary, Little Wratting | | Vicar: Christopher Giles | 3,401 | |

=== Deanery of Ixworth ===
| Benefice | Churches | Link | Clergy | Population served | Ref |
|---|---|---|---|---|---|
| Badwell (St Mary) and Walsham | St Mary, Badwell Ash; St Bartholomew, Finningham; All Saints, Great Ashfield; St Michael, Hunston; St Mary the Virgin, Langham; St George, Stowlangtoft; St Mary the Virgin, Walsham le Willows; St Margaret, Westhorpe | | Priest-in-Charge: Philip Merry; Curate: Katherine Valentine (see below) | 3,462 | |
| Pakenham (St Mary) with Norton and Tostock | St Mary, Pakenham; St Andrew, Norton; St Andrew, Tostock | | Priest-in-Charge: Katherine Valentine; Curate: Janine Price | 2,449 | |
| Blackbourne, Comprising Bardwell, Barnham, Euston, Fakenham Magna, Honington, Ingham, Ixworth, and Troston | SS Peter & Paul, Bardwell; St Gregory, Barnham; St Genevieve, Euston; St Peter, Fakenham Magna; All Saints, Honington; St Peter, Ampton; St Bartholomew, Ingham; St Peter, Great Livermere; St Mary, Ixworth; All Saints, Ixworth Thorpe; St Mary the Virgin, Troston | [] | Team Rector: Karen Burton; NSM: Tony Redman | 7,471 | |
| Hepworth (St Peter) with Hinderclay, Wattisfield and Thelnetham | St Margaret, Wattisfield | | Priest-in-Charge: Cathy Bladen; Curate: Adam Barclay | 6,284 | |
| Hepworth (St Peter) with Hinderclay, Wattisfield and Thelnetham | St Peter, Hepworth; St Mary, Hinderclay; St Nicholas, Thelnetham | | Priest-in-Charge: Cathy Bladen; Curate: Adam Barclay | 6,284 | |
| Stanton (All Saints), Hopton, Market Weston, Barningham and Coney Weston | St Andrew, Barningham; St Mary, Coney Weston; All Saints, Hopton; St Mary, Market Weston; All Saints, Stanton | | Priest-in-Charge: Cathy Bladen; Curate: Adam Barclay | 6,284 | |

=== Deanery of Lavenham ===
| Benefice | Churches | Link | Clergy | Population served | Ref |
|---|---|---|---|---|---|
| Bradfield St Clare (St Clare), Bradfield St George with Little Whelnetham, Cockfield, Felsham and Gedding | St Clare, Bradfield St Clare; St George, Bradfield St George; St Mary Magdalene, Little Whelnetham; St Peter, Cockfield; St Peter, Felsham; St Mary the Blessed Virgin, Gedding | | Rector: Sharon Potter | 2,208 | |
| Elmswell (St John the Divine) | St John the Divine, Elmswell | | Rector: Peter Goodridge; Curate: Ernest Okeke | 3,914 | |
| Lavenham (St Peter and St Paul) with Preston | SS Peter & Paul, Lavenham; St Mary the Virgin, Preston | | Rector: Stephen Earl; Curate: Paul Tyler; NSM: Elke Cattermole | 1,896 | |
| Monks Eleigh (St Peter) with Chelsworth and Brent Eleigh with Milden and Kettlebaston | St Peter, Monks Eleigh; St Mary, Brent Eleigh; All Saints, Chelsworth; St Mary, Kettlebaston; St Peter, Milden | | Priest-in-Charge: Carol Mansell | 992 | |
| Rattlesden (St Nicholas) with Thorpe Morieux, Brettenham and Hitcham | St Nicholas, Rattlesden; St Mary the Virgin, Brettenham; All Saints, Hitcham; St Mary the Virgin, Thorpe Morieux | | Rector: Tiffer Robinson | 2,243 | |
| Rougham (St Mary), Beyton with Hessett and Rushbrooke | All Saints, Beyton | | Rector: Vacant | 2,372 | |
| Rougham (St Mary), Beyton with Hessett and Rushbrooke | St Ethelbert, Hessett; St Mary, Rougham; St Nicholas, Rushbrooke | | Rector: Vacant | 2,372 | |
| St Edmund Way, Comprising Bradfield Combust, Great Whelnetham, Hawstead, Lawshall, Nowton, and Stanningfield | All Saints, Bradfield Combust; St Thomas a Becket, Great Whelnetham; All Saints, Hawstead; All Saints, Lawshall; St Peter, Nowton; St Nicholas, Stanningfield | | Rector: Jeremy Parsons; NSM: David Jenkins | 2,885 | |
| Woolpit (Blessed Virgin Mary) with Drinkstone | Blessed Virgin Mary, Woolpit | | Rector: Ruth Farrell; NSM: Michael Birt | 2,564 | |
| Woolpit (Blessed Virgin Mary) with Drinkstone | All Saints, Drinkstone | | Rector: Ruth Farrell; NSM: Michael Birt | 2,564 | |

=== Deanery of Mildenhall ===
| Benefice | Churches | Link | Clergy | Population served | Ref |
|---|---|---|---|---|---|
| Brandon (St Peter) | St Peter, Brandon | | Vicar: Sharron Coburn; Curate: Dennis Coburn | 9,193 | |
| Dalham (St Mary), Gazeley, Higham, Kentford and Moulton | St Mary the Virgin, Dalham; All Saints, Gazeley; St Stephen, Higham Green; St Mary the Virgin, Kentford; St Peter, Moulton | | Priest-in-Charge: Rosemary Rycraft | 2,543 | |
| Lakenheath (St Mary), Santon Downham and Elveden | St Mary, Lakenheath; SS Andrew & Patrick, Elveden; St Mary the Virgin, Santon Downham | | Vicar: Paul Tams | 5,060 | |
| Mildenhall (St Mary) | St Mary, Mildenhall; St Mary the Virgin, Barton Mills; St John, Beck Row; SS Laurence & Peter, Eriswell; St Andrew, Freckenham; St James, Icklingham; St Andrew, Cavenham; St Mary, Tuddenham; St Ethelbert, Herringswell; St Peter, West Row; All Saints, Worlington | | Priest-in-Charge: Vacant; Curate: Sandra Barton; Curate: Sue Leathley; Curate: David Butcher | 24,061 | |
| Newmarket (All Saints) | All Saints, Newmarket | | Vicar: Malcolm Osborne; NSM: Susan Shaw | 5,648 | |
| Newmarket (St Mary the Virgin) with Exning St Agnes | St Mary the Virgin, Newmarket; St Agnes, Exning | | Rector/Priest-in-Charge: John Hardy; NSM (Newmarket): Cheryl Belding; NSM (Newmarket): Jeremy Lind | 14,830 | |
| Exning (St Martin) (St Philip) with Landwade | St Martin, Exning; SS Philip & Etheldreda, Exning; St Nicholas' Chapel, Landwade | | Rector/Priest-in-Charge: John Hardy; NSM (Newmarket): Cheryl Belding; NSM (Newmarket): Jeremy Lind | 14,830 | |

=== Deanery of Sudbury ===
| Benefice | Churches | Link | Clergy | Population served | Ref |
|---|---|---|---|---|---|
| Acton (All Saints) with Great Waldingfield | All Saints, Acton; St Lawrence, Great Waldingfield | | Priest-in-Charge: Caroline Hallett; Curate: Faith Marsden | 3,293 | |
| Boxford (St Mary), Edwardstone, Groton, Little Waldingfield and Newton | St Mary, Boxford; St Mary the Virgin, Edwardstone; St Bartholomew, Groton; St Lawrence, Little Waldingfield; All Saints, Newton Green | | Priest-in-Charge: Vacant | 2,770 | |
| Bures (St Mary the Virgin) with Assington and Lt Cornard | St Mary the Virgin, Bures; St Edmund King & Martyr, Assington; All Saints, Little Cornard | | Vicar: Steve Morley; NSM: Mary Cantacuzene; NSM: Tricia Box | 2,754 | |
| Chadbrook, Comprising Alpheton, Shimplingthorne, and Long Melford | SS Peter & Paul, Alpheton; St George, Shimplingthorne | | Rector: Matt Lawson | 4,225 | |
| Chadbrook, Comprising Alpheton, Shimplingthorne, and Long Melford | Holy Trinity, Long Melford; St Catherine, Long Melford | | Rector: Matt Lawson | 4,225 | |
| Cornard, Great (St Andrew) | St Andrew, Great Cornard | | Vicar: Chris Ramsey; NSM: Jennie Ridley | 8,532 | |
| Glemsford (St Mary the Virgin), Hartest with Boxted, Somerton and Stanstead (Glem Valley United Benefice) | St Mary the Virgin, Glemsford; Holy Trinity, Boxted; All Saints, Hartest; St Margaret, Somerton; St James, Stanstead | | Rector: Patrick Prigg | 4,346 | |
| Sudbury (All Saints) with Ballingdon and Brundon | All Saints, Sudbury | | Priest-in-Charge: Simon Gill | 1,699 | |
| Sudbury (St Gregory) St Peter and Chilton | St Gregory, Sudbury | | Priest-in-Charge: Cheryl Collins | 11,649 | |

=== Deanery of Thingoe ===
| Benefice | Churches | Link | Clergy | Population served | Ref |
|---|---|---|---|---|---|
| Barrow (All Saints) | All Saints, Barrow; St Mary, Denham; St Andrew, Great Saxham; St Nicholas, Little Saxham; St Giles, Risby | | Interim Priest in Charge: Lynda Sebbage | 2,994 | |
| Barton, Great (Holy Innocents) and Thurston | Holy Innocents, Great Barton; St Peter, Thurston | | Vicar: Vacant | 5,370 | |
| Bury St Edmunds (All Saints) (St John the Evangelist) (St George) | All Saints, Bury St Edmunds; St George, Bury St Edmunds; St John the Evangelist, Bury St Edmunds | | Team Rector: Vacant; Team Vicar: Vacant; Curate: Vacant; Curate: Vacant; Assistant Priest: Julia Mann; House for Duty Priest: Val Gagen; Asst. Curate: Miriam Webb; Associate Priest: Tim Jones | 23,536 | |
| Lark Valley Benefice, The, Comprising Culford, Flempton, Fornham, Lackford, and Timworth | St Mary, Culford; St Mary, West Stow; St Catherine of Alexandria, Flempton; All Saints, Fornham All Saints; St Martin, Fornham St Martin; St Lawrence, Lackford; St Andrew, Timworth | | Team Rector: Vacant; Team Vicar: Vacant; Curate: Vacant; Curate: Vacant; Assistant Priest: Julia Mann; House for Duty Priest: Val Gagen; Asst. Curate: Miriam Webb; Associate Priest: Tim Jones | 23,536 | |
| Bury St Edmunds (Christ Church) Moreton Hall | Christ Church, Moreton Hall | | Vicar: Vacant; NSM: David Carpenter | 8,038 | |
| Bury St Edmunds (St Mary) (St Peter's District Church) | St Mary, Bury St Edmunds; St Peter, Bury St Edmunds | | Vicar: Simon Harvey; Curate: Laura Pope; NSM: David Crofts | 12,558 | |
| Horringer (St Leonard) | St Leonard, Horringer; St Andrew, Brockley; St Mary, Westley; St Petronilla, Whepstead | | Rector: Chris Griffiths | 1,993 | |

=== Deanery of Hartismere ===
| Benefice | Churches | Link | Clergy | Population served | Ref |
|---|---|---|---|---|---|
| Eye (St Peter and St Paul) | SS Peter & Paul, Eye | | Rector: Guy Sumpter | 2,984 | |
| Eye (St Peter and St Paul) | St Mary, Bedingfield; St Michael, Occold | | Rector: Guy Sumpter | 2,984 | |
| Hartismere, North, Comprising Brome, Burgate, Palgrave, Stuston, Thrandeston, and Wortham | St Mary, Brome; St Nicholas, Oakley; St Mary of Pity, Burgate; St Peter, Palgrave; All Saints, Stuston; St Margaret of Antioch, Thrandeston; St Mary the Virgin, Wortham | | Rector: Adrian Watkins | 2,604 | |
| Hartismere, South, Comprising Gislingham, Mellis, Stoke Ash with Thwaite, Thorndon with Rishangles, Thornham Magna, Thornham Parva, Wetheringsett, and Yaxley | St Mary the Virgin, Gislingham; St Mary the Virgin, Mellis; All Saints, Stoke Ash; All Saints, Thorndon; St Mary Magdalene, Thornham Magna; St Mary, Thornham Parva; All Saints, Wetheringsett; St Mary the Virgin, Yaxley | | Rector: Julia Lall | 4,158 | |
| Redgrave (St Mary) Cum Botesdale St Mary with Rickinghall | St Mary, Rickinghall Inferior | | Rector: Chris Norburn | 2,548 | |
| Redgrave (St Mary) Cum Botesdale St Mary with Rickinghall | St Botolph, Botesdale; All Saints, Redgrave | | Rector: Chris Norburn | 2,548 | |

=== Deanery of Hoxne ===
| Benefice | Churches | Link | Clergy | Population served | Ref |
|---|---|---|---|---|---|
| Athelington (St Peter), Denham, Horham, Hoxne, Redlingfield, Syleham and Wingfield | St Peter, Athelington; St John the Baptist, Denham; St Mary, Horham; SS Peter & Paul, Hoxne; St Andrew, Redlingfield; St Margaret, Syleham; St Andrew, Wingfield | | Rector: Michael Womack; NSM: Eleanor Goodison | 2,055 | |
| Four Rivers, Comprising Bedfield, Brundish, Cratfield, Laxfield, Monk Soham, Tannington, Wilby, and Worlingworth with Southolt | St Nicholas, Bedfield; St Lawrence, Brundish; St Mary, Cratfield; All Saints, Laxfield; St Peter, Monk Soham; St Ethelbert, Tannington; St Mary, Wilby; St Mary, Worlingworth | | Rector: David Burrell; Curate: David Mulrenan; Curate: Rebecca Artiss; NSM: Ron Orams | 3,073 | |
| Sancroft, Comprising Fressingfield, Mendham, Metfield, Stradbroke, Weybread, and Withersdale | SS Peter & Paul, Fressingfield; All Saints, Mendham; St John the Baptist, Metfield; All Saints, Stradbroke; St Andrew, Weybread; St Mary Magdalene, Withersdale | | Rector: Susan Loxton; NSM: Peter Schwier | 3,700 | |

=== Deanery of Loes ===
| Benefice | Churches | Link | Clergy | Population served | Ref |
|---|---|---|---|---|---|
| Alde, Upper, Comprising Badingham, Bruisyard, Cransford, Dennington, Rendham, and Sweffling | St John the Baptist, Badingham; St Peter, Bruisyard; St Peter, Cransford; St Mary the Virgin, Dennington; St Michael, Rendham; St Mary, Sweffling | | Priest-in-Charge: Martin Percival | 1,797 | |
| Debenham (St Mary Magdalene) and Helmingham | St Mary of Grace, Aspall; St Mary Magdalene, Debenham; St Mary, Framsden; St Mary, Helmingham; All Saints, Kenton; St Catherine, Pettaugh; St Andrew, Winston | | Rector: Susan Bates | 3,367 | |
| Framlingham (St Michael) with Saxtead | St Michael the Archangel, Framlingham; All Saints, Saxtead | | Rector: Mark Sanders; Curate: Mark Cresswell | 3,672 | |
| Mid Loes, Comprising Ashfield-Cum-Thorpe, Charsfield with Debach, Cretingham, Dallinghoo, Earl Soham, Hoo, Letheringham, and Monewden | St Mary, Ashfield cum Thorpe; St Peter, Charsfield; St Peter, Cretingham; St Mary, Dallinghoo; St Mary, Earl Soham; SS Andrew & Eustachius, Hoo; St Mary, Letheringham; St Mary, Monewden | | Rector: Stephen Brian; Curate: Kathleen Martin | 1,771 | |
| Orebeck | All Saints, Hacheston | | Priest-in-Charge: Graham Hedger | 4,532 | |
| Orebeck | St John the Baptist, Campsea Ashe | | Priest-in-Charge: Graham Hedger | 4,532 | |
| Orebeck | All Saints, Brandeston; All Saints, Easton; St Andrew, Kettleburgh; St Andrew, Marlesford; St Mary the Virgin, Parham | | Priest-in-Charge: Graham Hedger | 4,532 | |
| Wickham Market (All Saints) with Pettistree | All Saints, Wickham Market | | Vicar: Leslie Siu | 2,353 | |
| Wickham Market (All Saints) with Pettistree | SS Peter & Paul, Pettistree | | Vicar: Leslie Siu | 2,353 | |

=== Deanery of Saxmundham ===
| Benefice | Churches | Link | Clergy | Population served | Ref |
|---|---|---|---|---|---|
| Alde River Benefice, The, Comprising Benhall, Blaxhall, Farnham St Mary with Statford St Andrew, Great Glemham, Little Glemham, Snape, and Sternfield | St Mary, Benhall; St Peter, Blaxhall; St Mary, Farnham; All Saints, Great Glemham; St Andrew, Little Glemham; St John the Baptist, Snape; St Mary Magdalene, Sternfield | | Rector: Rachel Cornish | 2,134 | |
| Alde Sandlings, Comprising Aldeburgh with Hazelwood, Aldringham with Thorpe, Friston, and Knodishall with Buxlow | SS Peter & Paul, Aldeburgh | | Rector: Mark Lowther; NSM: Sheila Hart; NSM: Johanna Mabey; NSM: Nichola Winter | 4,422 | |
| Alde Sandlings, Comprising Aldeburgh with Hazelwood, Aldringham with Thorpe, Friston, and Knodishall with Buxlow | St Andrew, Aldringham; St Mary Magdalene, Friston; St Lawrence, Knodishall | | Rector: Mark Lowther; NSM: Sheila Hart; NSM: Johanna Mabey; NSM: Nichola Winter | 4,422 | |
| Leiston (St Margaret) | St Margaret of Antioch, Leiston | | Priest-in-Charge: Rich Finch | 5,505 | |
| Saxmundham (St John the Baptist) with Kelsale Cum Carlton | St John the Baptist, Saxmundham | | Rector: Andy Wolton; NSM: Nic Stuchfield | 4,651 | |
| Saxmundham (St John the Baptist) with Kelsale Cum Carlton | St Peter, Carlton; SS Mary & Peter, Kelsale | | Rector: Andy Wolton; NSM: Nic Stuchfield | 4,651 | |
| Yoxmere Benefice, The, Comprising Darsham, Dunwich, Middleton Cum Fordley, Peasenhall, Sibton, Theberton with Eastbridge, Westleton, and Yoxford | All Saints, Darsham; St James, Dunwich; Holy Trinity, Middleton; St Michael, Peasenhall; St Peter, Sibton; St Peter, Theberton; St Peter, Westleton; St Peter, Yoxford | | Vicar: Christine Redgrave | 2,899 | |

=== Deanery of Waveney and Blyth ===
| Benefice | Churches | Link | Clergy | Population served | Ref |
|---|---|---|---|---|---|
| Beccles (St Michael the Archangel) (St Luke's Church Centre) | St Michael the Archangel, Beccles; St Luke, Beccles | | Rector: Rich Henderson; Curate: Phil Cudmore; Curate: Benjamin Edwards; Curate: Claire Kiddy | 10,146 | |
| Blyth Valley Team Ministry, The, Comprising Blyford, Bramfield, Chediston, Halesworth, Holton, Linstead Parva, Spexhall, Thorington, Walpole, Wenhaston, and Wissett | All Saints, Blyford; St Andrew, Bramfield; St Mary, Chediston; St Mary, Halesworth; St Peter, Holton; St Margaret of Antioch, Linstead Parva; St Peter, Spexhall; St Peter, Thorington; St Mary the Virgin, Walpole; St Peter, Wenhaston; St Andrew, Wissett | | Team Rector: Vacant; Team Vicar: Janet Bunday; Curate: Jane Held | 7,964 | |
| Bungay (Holy Trinity) | Holy Trinity, Bungay; Holy Trinity, Barsham; All Saints, Mettingham | | Vicar: Ian Byrne | 5,700 | |
| Heveningham (St Margaret) with Ubbeston, Huntingfield and Cookley (Held jointly with the Blyth Valley Team Ministry) | St Margaret, Heveningham; St Michael & All Angels, Cookley; St Mary the Virgin, Huntingfield | | Priest-in-Charge: Vacant | 514 | |
| Hundred River and Wainford, Comprising Brampton, Ellough and Weston, Ilketshall St Andrew, Redisham, Ringsfield, Shadingfield, Sotterley with Willingham, Stoven, and Westhall | St Peter, Brampton; St Peter, Weston; St Andrew, Ilketshall St Andrew; St Peter, Redisham; All Saints, Ringsfield; St John the Baptist, Shadingfield; St Margaret, Sotterley; St Margaret, Stoven; St Andrew, Westhall | | Priest-in-Charge: Phil Miller; NSM: John Loftus | 2,207 | |
| Saints, The, Comprising South Elmham and Ilketshall | St Mary, Flixton; St Mary, Homersfield; St John the Baptist, Ilketshall St John; St Lawrence, Ilketshall St Lawrence; St Margaret, Ilketshall St Margaret; St Michael & All Angels & St Felix, Rumburgh; St George, St Cross South Elmham; St James the Apostle, St James South Elmham; St Margaret, St Margaret South Elmham; St Michael & All Angels, St Michael South Elmham; St Peter, St Peter South Elmham | | Rector: Vacant; Curate: Ian Byrne (see above) | 1,674 | |
| Sole Bay, Comprising Blythburgh, Reydon, Sotherton, South Cove, Southwold, Uggeshall, Walberswick, and Wangford | Holy Trinity, Blythburgh; St Margaret of Antioch, Reydon; St Andrew, Sotherton; St Lawrence, South Cove; St Edmund King & Martyr, Southwold; St Mary, Uggeshall; St Andrew, Walberswick; SS Peter & Paul, Wangford | | Team Rector: Simon Pitcher; Team Vicar: Alan Perry; NSM: Judy Miller | 5,194 | |
| Worlingham (All Saints) with Barnby and North Cove | All Saints, Worlingham; St John the Baptist, Barnby; St Botolph, North Cove | | Priest-in-Charge: Jane Penn | 4,655 | |
| Wrentham (St Nicholas), Covehithe with Benacre, Henstead with Hulver and Frostenden | St Nicholas, Wrentham; St Andrew, Covehithe; All Saints, Frostenden; St Mary, Henstead | | Vicar: Vacant | 1,560 | |

== Financial and charitable bodies ==
The Diocese of St Edmundsbury and Ipswich Board of Finance is the principal charity within the Diocese. It was incorporated on 16 February 1916.

1. . Training for, and maintenance of the ministry
2. . Building, alteration and repair of properties in connection with the Board's objects
3. . Religious education
4. . Provision of central organisation.
