= St Mary and St Peter's Church, Barham =

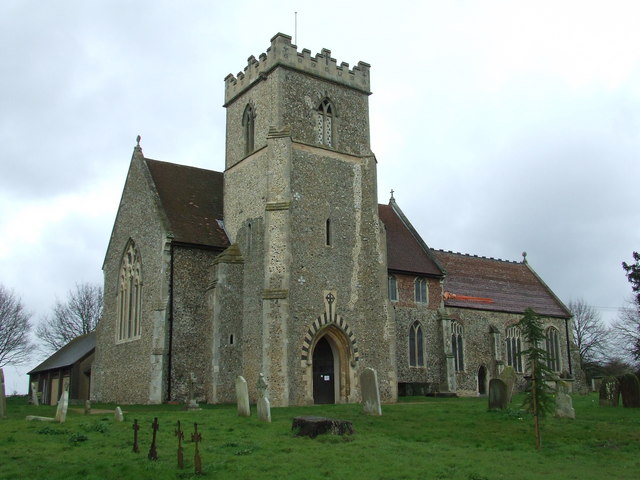
- St Mary and St Peter's Church, Barham
- 52.115561°N 1.119386°E
- OS grid reference: TM 136,509
- Location: Church Lane, Barham, Ipswich IP6 0PU
- Country: England
- Denomination: Anglican
- Churchmanship: Central Anglican
- Website: https://claydonchurches.com

History
- Status: Parish church

Architecture
- Functional status: Active
- Heritage designation: Grade I
- Designated: 9 December 1955
- Architectural type: Church

Specifications
- Capacity: 350

Administration
- Province: Canterbury
- Diocese: St Edmundsbury and Ipswich
- Archdeaconry: Ipswich
- Deanery: Gipping Valley
- Parish: Claydon and Barham

Clergy
- Priest: Jennifer Ablett

St Mary and St Peter's Church is an active Anglican parish church in the village of Barham near Ipswich. It contains a Henry Moore statue of Madonna and the Child originally held at St Peter, Claydon. It is in the deanery of Bosmere, part of the archdeaconry of Ipswich, and the Diocese of St Edmundsbury and Ipswich.

== History ==
A church is recorded as being within the village of Barham in the Domesday Book. Architectural features in the tower of long-and-short work (or quoins), which is typical of Anglo-Saxon architecture, suggests the church dates from Saxon times. It was known as St Mary from at least 1538, when the parishioners included the inhabitants of Barham Green. In 1975, the parish extended to include the village of Claydon, and when St Peter's Church in Claydon was officially made redundant, St Mary was retitled as St Mary and St Peter.

== Monuments ==
The best-known monument in the church is that of the Henry Moore statue of Madonna and Child originally held at St Peter's Church, Claydon. Crafted as a war memorial in commemoration for those in the village who died in the Second World War it was moved to St Mary after the closure of St Peter.

Other monuments and brasswork have been part of the church but were removed or destroyed over the course of its history.

In the chancel of the church were monuments to Jon Southwell, grandfather to Thomas Bedingfield as well as a tomb used for the burial of an unnamed inhabitant of the local estate of Shrubland Hall.

== Current status ==
St Mary and St Peter's Church was listed at Grade I on 9 December 1955.

Communion services, using the Book of Common Worship are offered on every Sunday morning at 8am except on the fifth Sunday of a month.

On the first Sunday of each month a shorter communion service based on the Book of Common Worship is held at 10am, on the second and fourth Sundays a full communion service is held at 10am.

On the third Sunday of each month at 10am a community worship service is held. This service is aimed at a wider age range of the congregation including families with children, adults and those with little or no experience of the Church. The services are often run by community groups or local charitable organisations otherwise unaffiliated with the Church itself.

Where a 5th Sunday falls within a month a family communion service is held at one of the three parishes served by the same parish grouping. One in three of these is held at St Mary and St Peter; the others being held at St Mary's Church, Great Blakenham or St Peter's Church, Henley.

== Notable clergy ==
William Kirby 1782–1850 Entomologist

== See also ==
- Grade I listed buildings in Suffolk
