= Jane Kinderley Stanford =

- Born: 19 January 1800
- Died: 25 July 1887
- Occupation: Novelist
- Spouse: Edward Pote Neale

Jane Kinderley Stanford Neale (19 January 1800 – 25 July 1887) was a British novelist.

Jane Kinderley Smith was born on 19 January 1800, the daughter of Francis Smith of Norwich. She married John Stanford of Ashbocking, who died in 1831. In 1851, she married, secondly and as his second wife, the Rev. Edward Pote Neale, vicar of Horsey, artist, and son of John Preston Neale. She died at Horsey on 25 July 1887.

Stanford wrote two novels and a number of works for children. Her novel The Stoic; or, Memoirs of Eurysthenes the Athenian (1834) was favourably reviewed by William Makepeace Thackeray in his publication The National Standard.

== Bibliography ==
- The Stoic; or, Memoirs of Eurysthenes the Athenian. London: Smith and Elder, 1834.
- A Lady's Gift: or, Woman as She Ought to Be. 1 vol. London: Smith, Elder, 1835.
- The Rector's Note-Book : Anah the Jewess. London : Hatchard and Son. 1843.
- Tales for Village Schools: Amusing and Instructive. 1 vol. London: Frederick Warne, 1866. (as Jane K. Neale)
- Philip Wright, or, The English Oak. London: Frederick Warne and Co., 1883. (as Jane K. Neale)
