= Henley Parish Church =

Henley Parish Church may refer to:

- St Mary the Virgin Church, Henley-on-Thames, Oxfordshire, England
- St Peter's Church, Henley in Suffolk, England
- St John the Baptist's church, Henley-in-Arden, Warwickshire, England
