= Peter Harold Wright =

Recipient of the Victoria Cross (1916–1990)

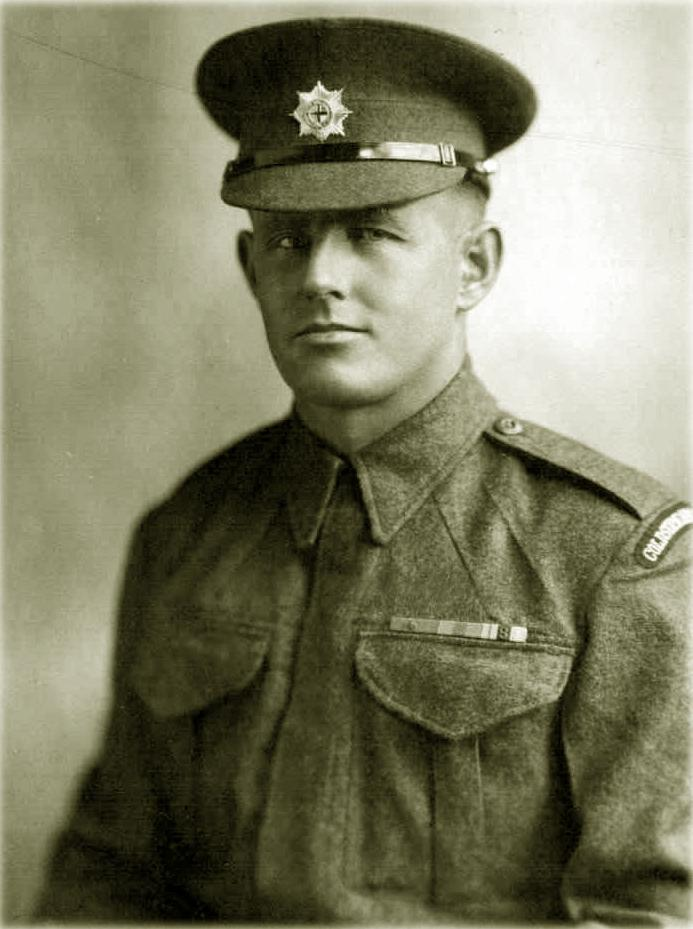
- Peter Harold Wright, pictured here in 1945.
- Born: 10 August 1916; Mettingham, Suffolk, England
- Died: 5 April 1990 (aged 73); Ipswich, Suffolk, England
- Burial place: All Saints Churchyard, Ashbocking, Suffolk, England
- Military career
- Allegiance: United Kingdom
- Branch: British Army
- Service years: 1936–1945
- Rank: Company Sergeant Major
- Service number: 2657545
- Units: Coldstream Guards
- Conflicts: Second World War
- Awards: Victoria Cross
- Other work: Farmer

Company Sergeant Major Peter Harold Wright VC (10 August 1916 – 5 April 1990) was a British Army soldier and an English recipient of the Victoria Cross (VC), the highest award for gallantry in the face of the enemy that can be awarded to British and Commonwealth forces.

== Early life and military career ==
Peter Harold Wright was born in Mettingham, near Bungay in Suffolk on 10 August 1916, during the First World War. Until the age of 20, he worked on his father's farm but decided to join the Coldstream Guards, one of the oldest regiments in the British Army. He served with the 3rd Battalion of his regiment.

== VC citation ==
Wright was 27 years old, and a company sergeant major in the 3rd Battalion, Coldstream Guards, British Army during the Second World War when the following deed took place for which he was awarded the VC.

On 25 September 1943 near Salerno, Italy, a steep, wooded hill was being assaulted by the 3rd Bn. Coldstream Guards, and Company Sergeant Major Wright's company, most of its officers killed, was held up near the crest. Sergeant Major Wright took charge and single-handed he silenced with grenades and bayonet three Spandau posts and then led his men to consolidate the position. He then beat off a counter-attack, and disregarding the heavy fire, brought up extra ammunition.

Wright's Distinguished Conduct Medal (DCM) was substituted for the VC on the instructions of King George VI.

== After the war ==
Wright retired from the army in 1945 and in the following year he married Mollie Hurren from Wenhaston, Suffolk. Together they farmed Church Farm at nearby Blythburgh.

Peter Harold Wright died in Ipswich, Suffolk on 5 April 1990, at the age of 73, and is buried in the village churchyard of All Saints at Ashbocking, also in Suffolk.
