= Church of St John the Baptist, Metfield =

Grade I listed church in Suffolk

Coordinates: 52°22′23″N 1°22′09″E

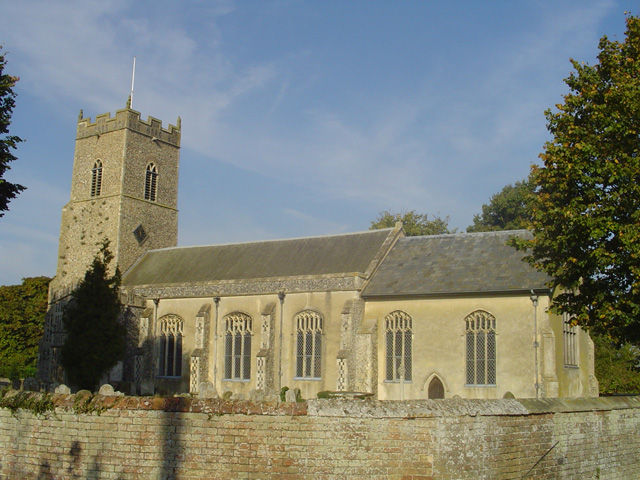
Church of St John the Baptist, Metfield

The Church of St John the Baptist, Metfield is the parish church of Metfield, Suffolk. It is a Grade I listed building. It is part of the Sancroft benefice of churches, part of the Hoxne Deanery, in the Diocese of St Edmundsbury and Ipswich.

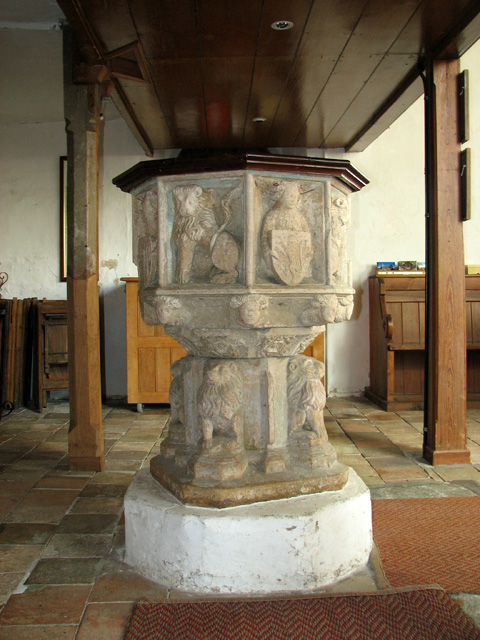

The 15th century octagonal font has panels which alternately depict lions and angels. The Angels are carrying a shield which depicts a leopard. This was derived from Jermy Coat of Arms. Sir John Jermy (b. 1375) was Lord of the manor and fought at the Battle of Agincourt.

== General references ==
- Knott, Simon (April 2019). "St John the Baptist, Metfield". suffolkchurches.co.uk.
