= Sally Gaze =

British Anglican priest

Sally Gaze (b 1969) is a British Anglican priest. Since 2019, she has served as Archdeacon for Rural Mission in the Diocese of St Edmundsbury and Ipswich

Gaze was educated at Sidney Sussex College, Cambridge, the University of Birmingham and The Queen's Foundation. She was ordained in the Church of England as a deacon in 1996 and as a priest in 1997. She served her title at Martley between 1996 and 2000. After another curacy at Crickhowell she was the Team Rector at the Tas Valley Team Ministry from 2002 to 2017. During this time she served on the working group which produced the Mission -shaped church report. In 2006, her book Mission-shaped and Rural: Growing Churches in the Countryside was published by CHP. After this she became Fresh Expressions Facilitator for the Diocese of Norwich, alongside her benefice role.

From 2017, Sally became Dean for Rural Mission Consultancy in St Edmundsbury for two years before being appointed archdeacon. Her ministry has included the starting of a county-wide Bishop's Mission Order called The Lightwave Community.
