= Henley, Suffolk =

Village in Suffolk, England

Coordinates: 52.118205°N 1.150458°E

Henley
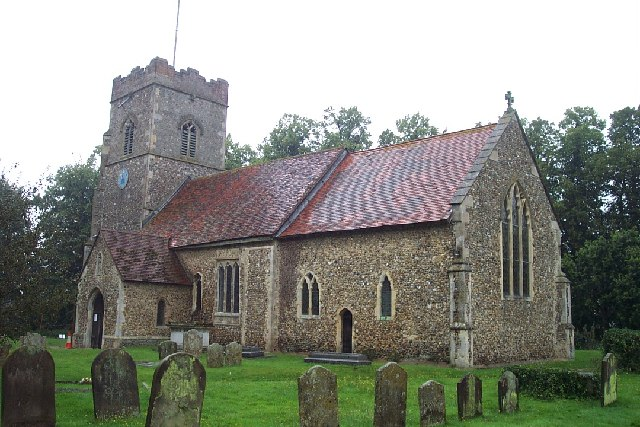
- Church of St Peter

- Location within Suffolk
- Population: 573 (2011 Census)
- Civil parish: Henley
- District: Mid Suffolk
- Shire county: Suffolk
- Region: East
- Country: England
- Sovereign state: United Kingdom
- Post town: IPSWICH
- Postcode district: IP6
- Dialling code: 01473
- Police: Suffolk
- Fire: Suffolk
- Ambulance: East of England
- UK Parliament: Bury St Edmunds and Stowmarket

Henley is a village and civil parish in the Mid Suffolk district of Suffolk, England, located just north of Ipswich. In 2011 the parish had a population of 573.

== Geography ==
Henley is positioned on a hill between two valleys. To the west of the village is a hill that extends down to the villages of Claydon and Barham situated in the Gipping Valley. East of the village is the Fynn Valley where the village of Witnesham is located. The main Henley Road runs through the centre of the village and provides good transport links with Ipswich. The road also connects the outer lying villages of Debenham and Gosbeck to the county town. Just outside the village is Rede Lane which runs down the hill to Claydon and provides access to the A14.

== Church ==
There was a church in Henley at the time William the Conqueror had the Domesday Survey prepared, there were also three manors within the village. The body of the present church dates from the 13th century, the porch having been added in the 15th century and the tower in the early 16th century (possibly 1525) when the village was known as Hendley. The vestry on the north side of the church was added in 1838 and the outer wall on the south of the churchyard is dated 1900. In the last 150 years there have been major renovations in 1846, 1895. 1904 and 2005 The church interior had been decorated in 1969 and 1993 but has just been completely redecorated in 2008. On the nave walls and ceiling old style lime wash was used rather than emulsion paint, which was removed in October 2008. Electric lighting was installed in 1946 and the whole building completely rewired in 1983. The roof required extensive repairs in 1959 and the nave was replaced and retiled in 2005, when the opportunity was taken to upgrade the lighting throughout the church. At the same time, more modern and efficient heating was also installed. The chancel roof was completely retiled in November 2007 under the 'chancel tax' legislation - http://www.cofe.anglican.org/about/churchlawlegis/faq/landfaq.html

It is thought that the roof would have been thatched at one time but is known to have been tiled since 1900. As one approaches the church, the perpendicular style tower can be seen. From the inscription above the west door asking for prayers for Thomas Sekeford (Seckford) and his second wife Margarete, it can be assumed that it was built at his expense. The Seckford arms, a pair of scissors or shears, appear between the letters. He died on 23 November 1505 and is buried at Great Bealings. The Seckford family gave generously to the town of Woodbridge. On the left, a symbol of a key links with St. Peter. The west window was repaired in 1872 but the original shape was retained. the decorative flintwork on the buttresses of the tower is considered to be a good example of such work. The stone and flintwork of the tower were refurbished in 1980 at a cost of £9,000. This included cleaning and repointing the Elizabethan brickwork around the top of the tower. The flag pole came from HMS Ganges in 1902, a naval training establishment in Shotley for a number of years. This is surmounted by a weathervane in the form of St. Peter's Key. Also on top of the tower is a plaque recording the replacement of the lead on the tower in 1772. The "plummers" bill for the work was £18 18s 9d. Recently both the flagpole and weathervane have had major repair work, resulting in removing, repairing and replacing the lead on the tower. The present electric clock was installed in 1973 and made to strike the hours in 1976. For up to 300 years there was a turret clock with a six-foot pendulum which needed to be wound up regularly. This was taken out when the electricity arrived. In June 2008 the clock was completely replaced with an up to date 24-hour system. Between the tower and the porch on a corner stone nine feet above ground level can be seen an old scratch dial (or sundial); a similar one can be found on the right of the porch entrance.

Above the entrance to the porch, in a niche, there is a statue of St. Peter. This is believed to have been put there during the renovation of 1895 as the niche was known to be empty in 1886. The porch, built before the tower, is not of the same high standard of workmanship. There are indications that materials were re-used. The carving above the entrance to the church is Norman but the pointed top suggests to scholars that it belonged to a wider door and was re-used, making a more pointed arch on the narrower door, possibly when the porch was built. On the left of the door it is obvious that a carved piece of stone has been re-used to infill the wall. On the right there is an indication of the remains of a stoup, for worshippers to bless themselves before entering the church.

On the left is a list of vicars since 1315, which was about the time of the building of the present church. One wooden plaque above the door commemorates the Queen's Silver Jubilee in 1977, with a second added in 2012 for the Diamond Jubilee. The latter was carved in lime wood, grown on a Suffolk estate. It was designed and carved by the church's organist and choirmaster as a gift to the church to mark 15 years of service; it includes the emblem of Henley (the Crossed Keys of St Peter), a diamond and a cameo of the church itself.

There is a list showing the ladies and gentlemen, who made the kneelers used in the church. The porch was renovated about 1846 and then repaired again in 1981. A new doorstep was installed to mark the 2000 millennium.

The eight-sided font was a replacement in the 1840s although it is considered that an earlier base was re-used. In 1990 four of the pews at the back of the church were reduced in width to give more room to the families around the font. The gallery at the west end was altered in 1846, and upgraded to health and safety standards in 2006. Previously it jutted further into the church. In earlier days the Sunday School children sat up there during services. The glass screen was inserted in 1973 sealing off the ringing chamber but leaving the bell ringers visible. Henley is justifiably proud of its eight bells; the two oldest are dated 1480 with another 1736 and one dated 1809. The remainder were installed in 1902. In 1972 the bell frame was renovated and the bells rehung on ball bearings. The ringers also have a hand bell team which is well known. The present handbells were purchased in 1969. The bell for the new clock to strike the hours was installed in 1976 having been transferred from a church at Ubbeston and was cast in 1520. Between the ceiling of the nave and the roof is an opening entered from the tower where it is suggested that the villagers kept smuggled goods. In 1846, when the steps up to the tower were repaired, it was observed that the steps were well worn. The funeral hatchment (wooden plaque) on the wall opposite the porch is for Miss Harriet Ibbetson who died in 1843-aged 69, daughter of Sir James Ibbetson from Yorkshire. She was a tenant of Henley Hall and gave generously to the parish including the vestry, built in 1838 as a day school, plus a legacy for a church education.

The vestry was rebuilt in 1904 and in 1971 had additional facilities provided from a legacy. In 1988 the roof was retiled at a cost of £6,000 and in 1993 modern heating was installed. The porch at the north end of the vestry was converted into a toilet room in 2003.

The vestry was used as a school, with part of the churchyard as a playground, until the present School Board building down the road was built in 1875. In the northwest corner of the churchyard is a brick "shed" which was refurbished in 1992 for use as a general store.

A seat has been placed on the south side in memory of a man from the village who died young. The building may have been there when the school was held in the vestry. The building was used at one time as a fuel store for the coal stove used to heat the church. The stove was in the base of the tower.

In the vestry are pictures of earlier vicars and choirs, including Rev. H. Pearson and Rev. W.C. Pearson, father and son, who between them held office for 92 years until W.C. Pearson died on 13 January 1942 having fallen downstairs in the wartime blackout and was found by his housekeeper next morning in the vicarage which stood at the other side of Church Lane until demolished in 1976. It is said that his ghost was sometimes sensed at the head of the stairs. His tomb is between the church porch and the tower with his father's, mother's and a sister's near the priests door in the chancel and adjacent to the raised tomb erected by Miss Ibbetson's only surviving brother. The 30 chairs in the vestry were given in 1993 as a memorial to Albert Hill, Sidney Quinton and Jack Ward, all well loved inhabitants of the village. The parish council also gave a clock in memory of Jack Ward in 1991 for his services to the council and the village. To the right of the vestry is a charming memorial to Elizabeth Vere, daughter of Rev. Glanville of Offton. The de Vere family were connected to the parish for over 200 years. Anne, the wife of an earlier John de Vere, has a tombstone in the chancel recording their 16 years of marriage and the surviving children; four sons (William, John, Francis and Edward) plus five daughters (Elizabeth, Mary, Anne, Frances and Susan). She subsequently remarried George Gosnell of Ipswich. A later member of the family, Thomas, was mayor of Norwich and an MP. He gave a legacy to the parish with a request for special services on St. Thomas' day, 21 December. The family sold out and left the parish in 1840. The various war memorials record the losses suffered by the village and in recent years details of these young men have been traced and recorded. The Good News Bibles in the pews and on the lectern with the embroidered bookmark were given in memory of parishioners and their families. The modern pattern kneelers were embroidered and given to the church in 1981-1984. Moving along the north wall, the first three-light window was inserted in 1872 "in place of an old brick one which was out of repair". The next two-light window was also repaired in 1872 but the shape was not changed. This work, plus repairs to the west windows appear to have been done by Mr Haggar to whom £23 16s was paid in June 1872. The two lancet windows in the chancel appear to be originals in the early English style. The Roland electronic piano in the chancel was brought into use on 4 September 1994 to replace the Hammond organ used since 1952. With the attachment of an Orla flute expander, organ sounds can be produced in addition to the variety of piano sounds that the Roland can produce. Before the renovations of 1895 the floor of the chancel was some six inches higher having been raised fifty years earlier, making a steep step up. During the renovations the floor was lowered to its original position and a dark wooden reredos across the east end of the church removed. The panelling had the creed, Ten Commandments and the Lord's Prayer painted on it. The dossal curtain at the back of the altar was renewed in 1978. The old painted altar rails were replaced in 1875. The free-standing lectern was acquired by the church in the early 1950s and holds a copy of the limited number of 'Vinegar Bibles', so called because of a printing error in Luke 20 where there is a reference to the parable of the vinegar (for vineyard). The Decorated style east window is relatively simple and was inserted "in Mr. Beevor's time (1840) in place of a wooden one of similar shape". The aumbry (stone cupboard) on the north side would be where the sacrament was reserved for the sick. The church has two sets of plate, one in use normally which includes a ciborium given by the Mothers Union in 2000 and the other, dated 1728, engraved with scenes from the passion. The second flagon and Paten are on show in the Treasury of the Cathedral at Bury St. Edmunds. Coinciding with the date on the earlier plate it is recorded that £1 2s 6d was spent on the purchase of a new "carpet" (cover) for the Communion Table. The carpet, running the length of the church, was replaced in 2002 following a receipt of a legacy. The altar cross and most of the brass items were given in memory of Rev. H. Pearson towards the end of the 19th century. Two further brass vases were given in 1993 and the brass jug used baptismal services was acquired in 1996. A wooden cross made by a parishioner is in place when the brass cross is locked away.

On the south (right hand) side of the church is the 13th-century piscina, in effect a sink where the communion vessels were washed. Adjacent is the Sedilia (priests' seats) inset in the wall with interesting stonework above.

The first window on the south side is in memory of Rev. Beevor, vicar for 13 years, who died after a long illness at the age of 47 in 1849. In those days there was also a curate who was paid about £50 per year. Lists exist of these curates most of whom stayed one or two years. In the Rev. Beevor's time the Meadows-Theobald family appear to have let Henley Hall to various tenants and after Miss Ibbetson's death Charles Steward occupied it. After the recovery of his wife's health he expressed his gratitude by paying for the next double light window. He paid for the renovation of the seating, including the carving of the poppy-head bench end replacements in the same style as the original where necessary. He also paid for the renovation of the porch. In early photographs, taken about 1900, the relatively simple pulpit appears across on the north side of the church and the hatchments were nearer the front of the church.

The large window on the south side is similar to windows at Barham and Barking and in the dairy at Shrubland Hall. These are all believed to have come from the old Shrubland Hall. The carving on the outside of the window has been recognised as containing the arms of the Booth family who occupied Shrubland Hall and the Swillington family who married into the Booth family.

To the left of the Shrubland window can be seen the bricked-up entrance and exit of the roodloft staircase. The outer wall is thicker here to accommodate the steps which would have given access to the beam across the church, which would have held candles and a figure of Christ on the cross. This would have been removed at the time of the Reformation but there is a story that Henley church clung to Rome for a while and that a window on the stairs was used as a lookout to obtain warning of the approach of the image-breakers.

The last window dedicated to St. Peter is thought to have been put in about 1900. The tablet on the wall to Rev. John Meadows Theobald reminds us of a local family. The Meadows were at Witnesham at the time of William the Conqueror and moved to Henley in 1630 when Ralph Meadows purchased the farm of William Dameron, who have emigrated to America. The family name was changed in 1774 to Meadows Theobald. John Meadows Theobald held the manor until his death in 1830 although he lived in Claydon Hall. The only son, of the same name (referred to on the tablet), appears to have moved back to Henley Hall after the departure of Charles Steward who moved to Thurleston Hall. His son, also John, was killed at Deyrah in the East Indies in 1876 and a memorial to him is in the east of the churchyard. The hatchment above the door nearer to the gallery was for Mary, mother of John referred to on the tablet, and a tombstone near the altar lists members of the family in the 18th and 19th centuries. The other hatchment is for Mrs. Henrietta Sleorgin who has the raised tomb outside the east window. Little is known of this lady except that she is understood to have sent parcels to Margaret Catchpole, the Ipswich woman transported to Australia for taking a horse without permission.

In 1836 the vicarage would have been occupied by Rev. Beevor who died of consumption when only 47. Rev. Henry Pearson MA, born 18 August 1817, died 5 May 1894, was vicar from 1849 to 1894. He had two sons: one became a naval officer, the second followed him as vicar. He also had a daughter Isobel who died 22 January 1933 aged 78, and did not marry. Henry's son William Carter Pearson was born 11 February 1859 and died 13 January 1942. He was vicar after the death of his father for 48 years.

He was a keen historian and either took or arranged for a number of local photographs of which a selection are currently on display in the Community Centre.

== Amenities ==
The village has a large community centre located in the centre of the village off Ashbocking Road which contains many facilities including a large hall used for sport and other functions, smaller rooms including a bar and the Henley Pre-School, a large football pitch and changing rooms and a small children's play area. The football pitch is home to Henley Athletic who currently play in Division One of the Suffolk and Ipswich Football League (as in 2012/2013 season). The main hall has recently hosted many dramatic companies to put on shows for the local people.

There is also a farm shop called the 'Egg Shed' on the corner of Mill Lane and Henley Road located opposite the Fiveways Garage. This is home to the Happy Hens of Henley Free range eggs and also sells sausages and other seasonal goods. There is also a bus stop next to five ways garage.

There is an intermittent bus service that runs from the village of Debenham through the centre of Henley and into Ipswich which runs every hour.
