= St Martin's Church, Nacton =

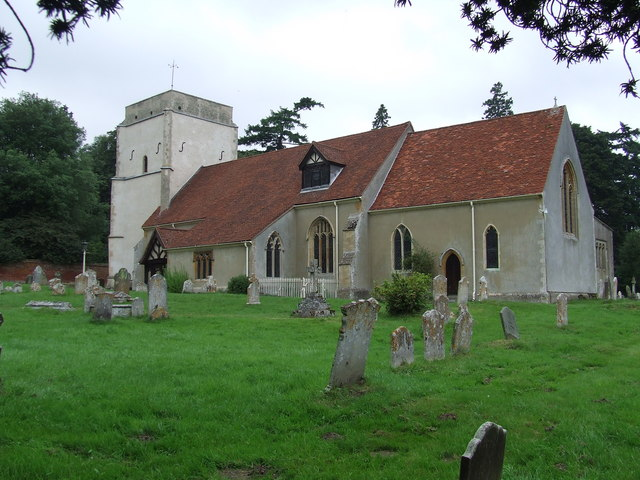
- St Martin's Church, Nacton
- OS grid reference: TM2170439693
- Location: Church Road, Nacton, Suffolk IP10 0EP
- Country: England
- Denomination: Anglican
- Churchmanship: Central Anglican

History
- Status: Parish church

Architecture
- Functional status: Active
- Heritage designation: Grade II*
- Designated: 16 March 1966
- Architectural type: Church

Administration
- Province: Canterbury
- Diocese: St Edmundsbury and Ipswich
- Archdeaconry: Ipswich
- Deanery: Colneys
- Parish: Nacton

St Martin's Church is located in the village of Nacton near Ipswich. It is an active Anglican parish church in the deanery of Colneys, part of the archdeaconry of Norfolk, and the Diocese of St Edmundsbury and Ipswich.

St Martin's Church was listed at Grade II* on 16 March 1966.

== History ==
The church is originally medieval in origin with major reworking carried out in the early 20th century at which point both a north aisle, organ chamber and vestry were added. The tower originally from the 15th century was remodelled in the late 18th to early 19th century to remove the belfry and redesign to the current parapet.

== Memorials ==
The church contains memorials to several local families in various forms. Located in the North aisle are memorials for Edward Vernon and family. Located in the nave is a memorial to Philip Broke and a 15th-century brasswork is mounted in the floor in memory of Richard Fastolph of Broke Hall. A south transept forms a memorial chapel to the Broke family including reference to acts during the American War of Independence.

== Glasswork ==
The church contains several stained glass windows ranging from medieval through to the 1920s. Pieces of glasswork include a 1913 depiction of the Adoration of the Shepherds and Magi by Burlison and Grylls and a memorials to both Herbert Pretyman and for the safe return of two members of the same family from World War I. Also displayed in glass are the heraldric symbols of the local Broke families marriages dating from the 1860s.

== See also ==
Media related to St Martin, Nacton at Wikimedia Commons
