= All Saints Church, Ashbocking =

Church in Ashbocking, Suffolk, England

All Saints' Church, Ashbocking
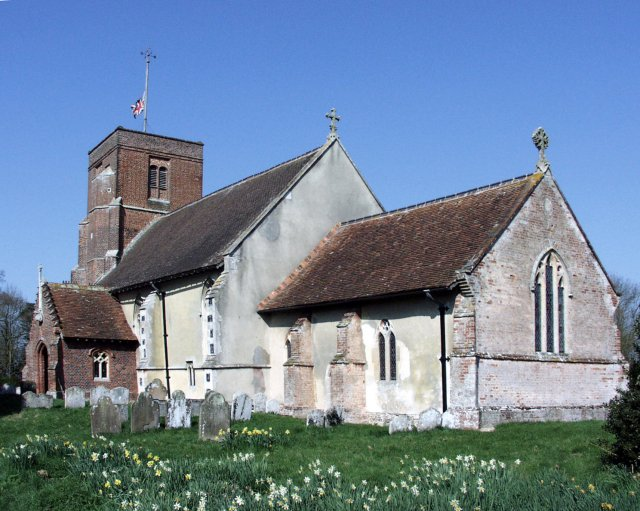
- All Saints' Church, Ashbocking
- OS grid reference: TM1695654509
- Location: Ashbocking Church Lane, Ashbocking, Suffolk IP6 9LG
- Country: England
- Denomination: Anglican
- Churchmanship: Central Anglican

History
- Status: Parish church

Architecture
- Functional status: Active
- Heritage designation: Grade I
- Designated: 9 December 1955
- Architectural type: Church

Administration
- Province: Canterbury
- Diocese: St Edmundsbury and Ipswich
- Archdeaconry: Ipswich
- Deanery: Woodbridge
- Parish: Ashbocking

Clergy
- Priest: Hilary Sanders

All Saints' Church is located in the village of Ashbocking near Ipswich. It is an active Anglican parish church in the deanery of Woodbridge, part of the archdeaconry of Ipswich, and the Diocese of St Edmundsbury and Ipswich.

There is mention of a church being in the village of Ashbocking in the Domesday Book of 1086. Parts of the present church date from between the 13th and 14th centuries.

All Saints' Church was listed at Grade I on 9 December 1955.

== See also ==
- Grade I listed buildings in Suffolk

Media related to All Saints' church, Ashbocking at Wikimedia Commons
