= Cotton, Suffolk =

Village in Suffolk, England

Coordinates: 52.26149°N 1.03358°E

Cotton
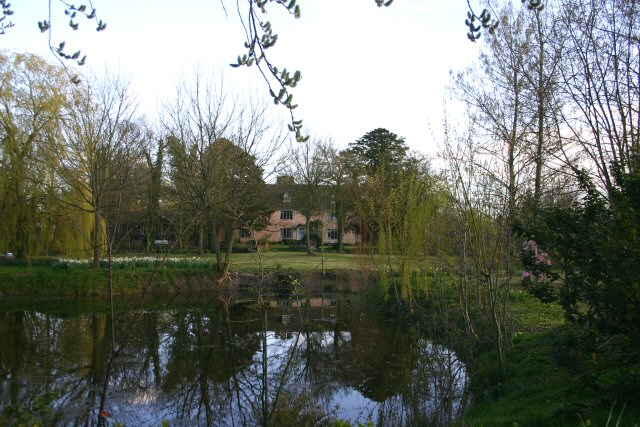
- Hampnalls Hall

- Location within Suffolk
- Population: 510; 526 (2011)
- OS grid reference: TM 0712 6693
- District: Mid Suffolk
- Shire county: Suffolk
- Region: East
- Country: England
- Sovereign state: United Kingdom
- Post town: Stowmarket
- Postcode district: IP14
- Dialling code: 01449
- Police: Suffolk
- Fire: Suffolk
- Ambulance: East of England
- UK Parliament: Central Suffolk and North Ipswich

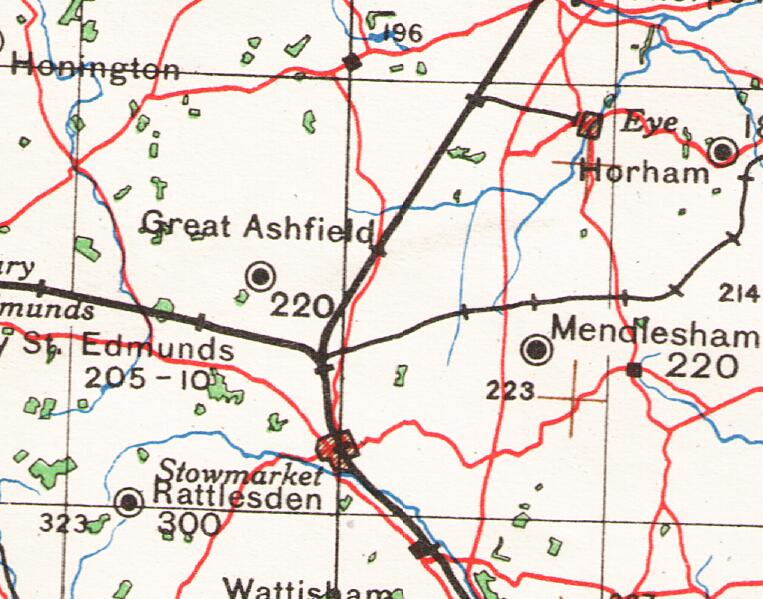
A 20th Century map of Cotton, Suffolk 5th edition published in 1940

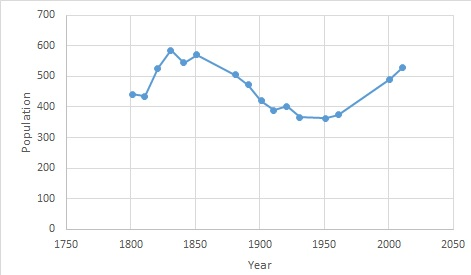
Total population of Cotton Civil Parish, Suffolk, as reported by the Census of Population from 1801–2011

Cotton is a small village and civil parish located in the Mid Suffolk district of Suffolk in eastern England. Cotton lies a few miles to the east of the Great Eastern Main Line and to the west of the A140. Nearby villages include Mendlesham and Bacton, and the parish also includes the small hamlet of Dandy Corner. Its precise location is 4 1/2 miles north east of its post town, Stowmarket, and 2 1/2 miles north west of Mendlesham.

In 2005 its population was 510 and according to the 2011 census, the total population had increased by 16 to 526.

In the 1870s, Cotton was described as

"a parish in Hartismere district, Suffolk; on the Eastern Union railway, 1½ mile S of Finningham r. station, and 6 N by E of Stowmarket. The church is good; and there is a Wesleyan chapel, a parochial school, and charities."

== Population ==
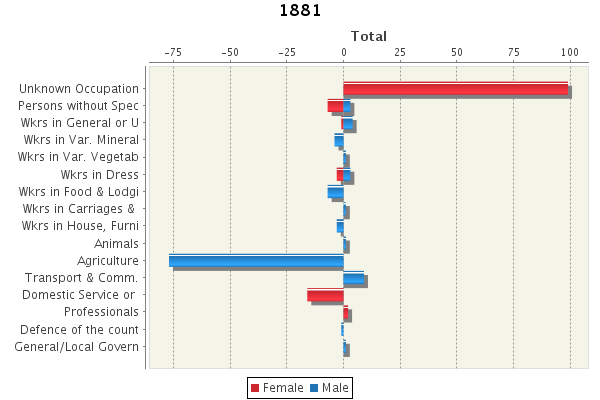
1881 Census Data – 'Occupations of Males and Females in the Division and its Registration Counties'

Between 1801 and 2011, according to UK Census data, the population of Cotton has fluctuated quite a lot. In 1801, the population of the village was 441; it continued to rise until it reached its peak population in 1831 of a population of 585. It then began to steadily decrease for several decades until 1951 where the village reached its lowest recorded population of 363. This could have affected the economy and industry of Cotton, as the workforce was dwindling. However, after this point in 1951, the population began to gradually increase again and in 2011 it was recorded to be 526.

== Religion ==
Cotton appears to be a one religion parish: of the 526 people living in Cotton in 2011, 368 declared themselves as being part of the Christian religion, only 1 Buddhist and 159 either of no religion or not stating their religion. In 2001, there were 489 people living in Cotton, and of these, 420 were of a Christian faith. There were no other religions declared in the 2001 census, only 69 people who either did not state their religion or had no religion.

== Church ==
St Andrew's Church, located on Church Street, is the local place of Church of England worship for Cotton, which is classified under the Diocese of St Edmundsbury & Ipswich. It is a listed building which holds services twice a month and several other special services throughout the year.

== Housing ==
In 2011, there was a recorded 225 households in Cotton. This had increased since 2001 where it was recorded to be 205. The most common type of household in 2011, according to the Census data, was married couple households with no dependent children. This type of household accounted for nearly half of the total households.

== Occupation ==
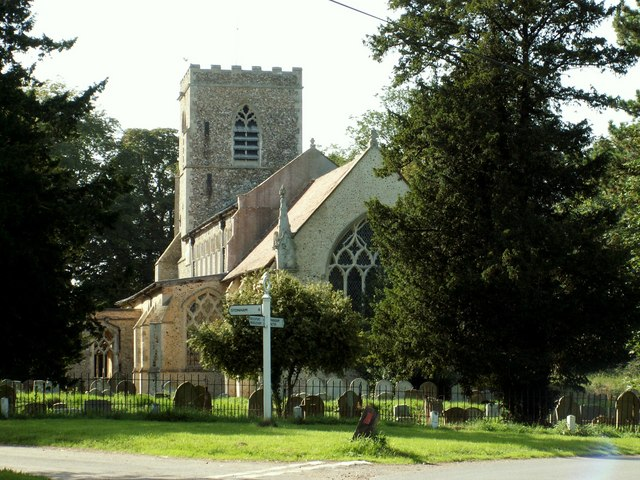
St Andrew's Church

In 1881, there was a large male and female divide concerning choice of occupations. The most popular occupations for men and women were in the agriculture and domestic service or office-based industries, respectively. With a population of 506 in 1881, 77 males worked in agriculture and 16 females worked in domestic services. In 2011 there was 263 people between the ages of 16 and 74 who were in employment. 34 were in a managerial occupation, 34 in a professional career, 55 in the skilled trade industry, and just 18 people operating plant machinery. This is very different to the 1881 career distribution, as it has shifted from an agricultural-based workforce to a more service-based workforce, in both men and women.

== Land ==
The total area of the parish is 7,556.35m^{2}. The vast majority of the land use in Cotton is greenspace, with 7,111.22m^{2} of land being green, agricultural area. Domestic land use – i.e. residential areas – comprise 29.55m^{2} of the parish and 19.18m^{2} is non-domestic land use.
