= St Botolph's Chapel, Botesdale =

- St Botolph's Chapel, Botesdale
- 52°20′34″N 1°00′22″E
- OS grid reference: TM 04877 75890
- Location: Chapel Lane, Botesdale, Suffolk, IP22 1RG
- Country: England
- Denomination: Anglican
- Churchmanship: Central Anglican
- Website: www.stmarysrickinghallinferior.onesuffolk.net

History
- Status: Parish church
- Founded: Circa 14th Century

Architecture
- Heritage designation: Grade II*
- Designated: 29 July 1955
- Architectural type: Chapel of ease

Administration
- Province: Canterbury
- Diocese: St Edmundsbury and Ipswich

St Botolph's Chapel is located in Botesdale, Suffolk. Built as a chapel of ease for the parish church of St Mary's Church, Redgrave, it now serves as the parish church, since St Mary's was declared redundant in 2004. It is a Grade II* listed building.

The earliest reference to the chapel was in a court roll in 1338, but in c. 1470 the chapel was converted to a chantry using land and property left by John Sheriffe.

In 1547 the chapel passed to the Crown following the Dissolution of the Monasteries, and in 1576 the chapel building was converted to use as a grammar school founded by Sir Nicholas Bacon. It closed as a school in 1878, reverting to use as a chapel of ease in 1883.
