= St Mary's Church, Stoke-by-Nayland =

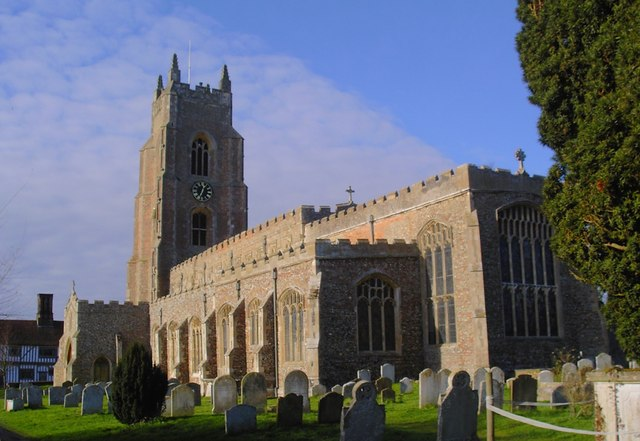
- St Mary's Church, Stoke-by-Nayland
- St Mary's Church, Stoke-by-Nayland
- 51°59′22.01″N 0°53′28.77″E
- OS grid reference: TL 98628 36281
- Location: Stoke-by-Nayland
- Country: England
- Denomination: Church of England

History
- Dedication: St Mary

Architecture
- Heritage designation: Grade I listed

Specifications
- Length: 168 feet (51 m)
- Height: 126 feet (38 m)

Administration
- Diocese: Diocese of St Edmundsbury and Ipswich
- Archdeaconry: Ipswich
- Deanery: Hadleigh
- Parish: Stoke-by-Nayland

St Mary's Church is a Grade I listed parish church in the Church of England in Stoke-by-Nayland.

== History ==
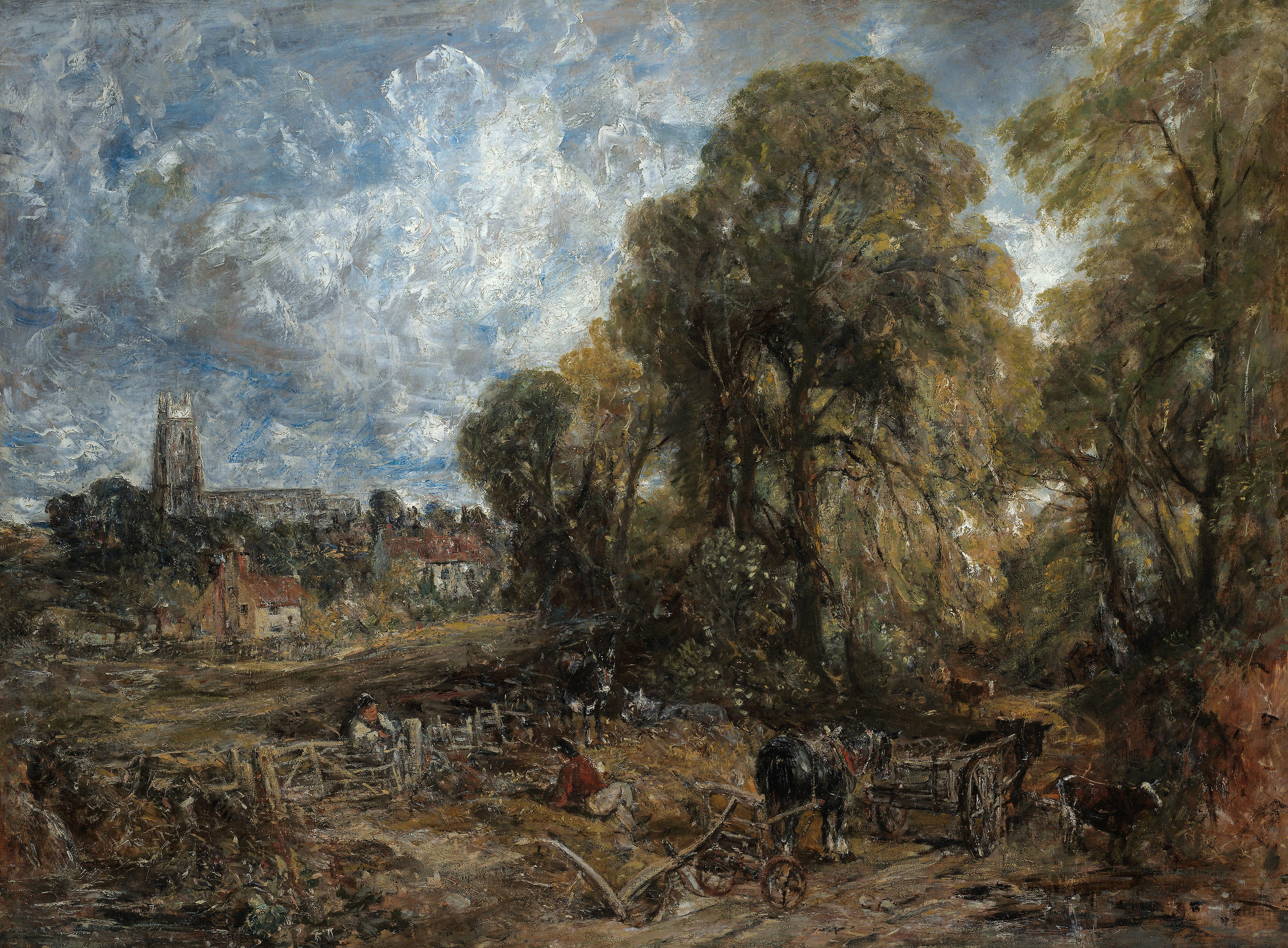
Stoke-by-Nayland by John Constable, 1836. St Mary's is on the left

The earliest parts of the church date from the late 13th century or early 14th century and comprise the south porch, St Edmund's Chapel (ca. 1318) and some of the aisle wall. The remainder was rebuilt in the 15th centuryin the perpendicular style. Its patron during this rebuilding was Sir John Howard (1443–1485), made Duke of Norfolk in 1483. Raised in the village, Howard was the right-hand man of both Edward IV and Richard III, who created him Duke of Norfolk. Howard's principal home was Tendring Hall at Stoke-By-Nayland. His coat of arms with Howard impaling Tendring may be found in several places.

== Special Features ==
The church is noted for the south porch with its groin vaulted roof, restored carved bosses and priests chamber above. The original and almost unique 15th-century south doors of Stoke- by-Nayland church reveal a Jesse tree, carved with figures, birds and insects, exquisitely carved in oak. Other special features of the interior include the font, clearly marked with the rose en soleil badge of Edward IV and with panels of the emblems of the four Evangelists.

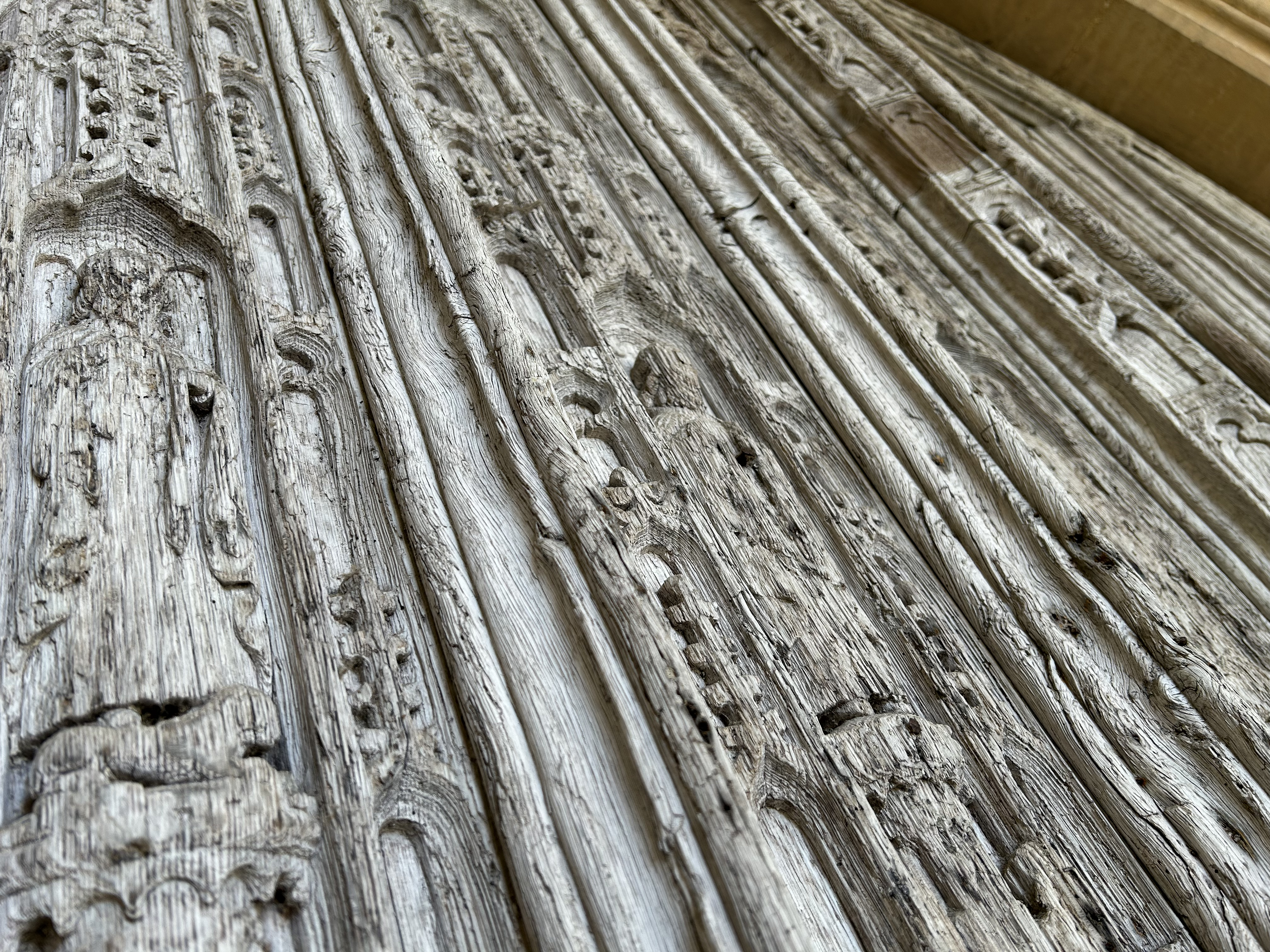
The church door in Stoke by Nayland, Suffolk

The tower is 126 feet (38 metres) high to the top of the pinnacles. Believed to be one of the fifty finest medieval church towers in England, St Mary's tower dominates the skyline of Dedham Vale and can be seen from miles around. John Constable, who painted the church on a number of occasions wrote that 'The tower is the church's grandest feature, which from its commanding height seems to impress on the surrounding country its own sacred dignity of character';. Constable also described the soaring and supremely elegant arch beneath it as “the crowning beauty of the interior”

== Memorials ==
There is a brass in memory of Lady Catherine Howard of Tendring Hall, daughter of Sir William Molyns and wife of John Howard, 1st Duke of Norfolk, Earl Marshal of England. The Howards were the third most powerful family in England at the time of the Wars of the Roses.

An explanatory board in the church says that her funeral in Stoke-by-Nayland in 1465 was attended by the brothers of Edward IV: Richard Plantagenet, Duke of Gloucester, the future Richard III of England, and George Plantagenet, Duke of Clarence as well as Anthony Woodville, 2nd Earl Rivers. Howard was the great-grandmother of both Anne Boleyn and Catherine Howard, the second and fifth wives of Henry VIII. Howard's brass was paid for by her son Thomas in 1520 which is why she wears Tudor dress rather than the fashion of her time. Catherine's mantle has her husband's arms on one side with the Molynes on the other. Another brass is to Sir William de Tendring (d1408), considered to be a portrait.

The church has a number of other 15th century brasses and a wall monument to Sir Francis Mannock, 1st Baronet, of Giffords Hall (d 1634). See the Mannock baronets . There is also a monument to Lady Anne Windsor (d1615), who left an endowment of four almshouses. These are still administered by a village committee.

== John Howard Window ==
Contemporary depiction of John Howard at prayer from stained glass window, south chapel, St. Mary's Church. Image believed to have been reproduced (c.1500) in a painting at Tendring Hall, Norfolk, both now lost (see image, right).

All the mediaeval glass in St Mary's fell victim to Colonel Dowsing's Parliamentary Commissioners in 1643, with other examples of Puritan vandalism to be seen in the church.

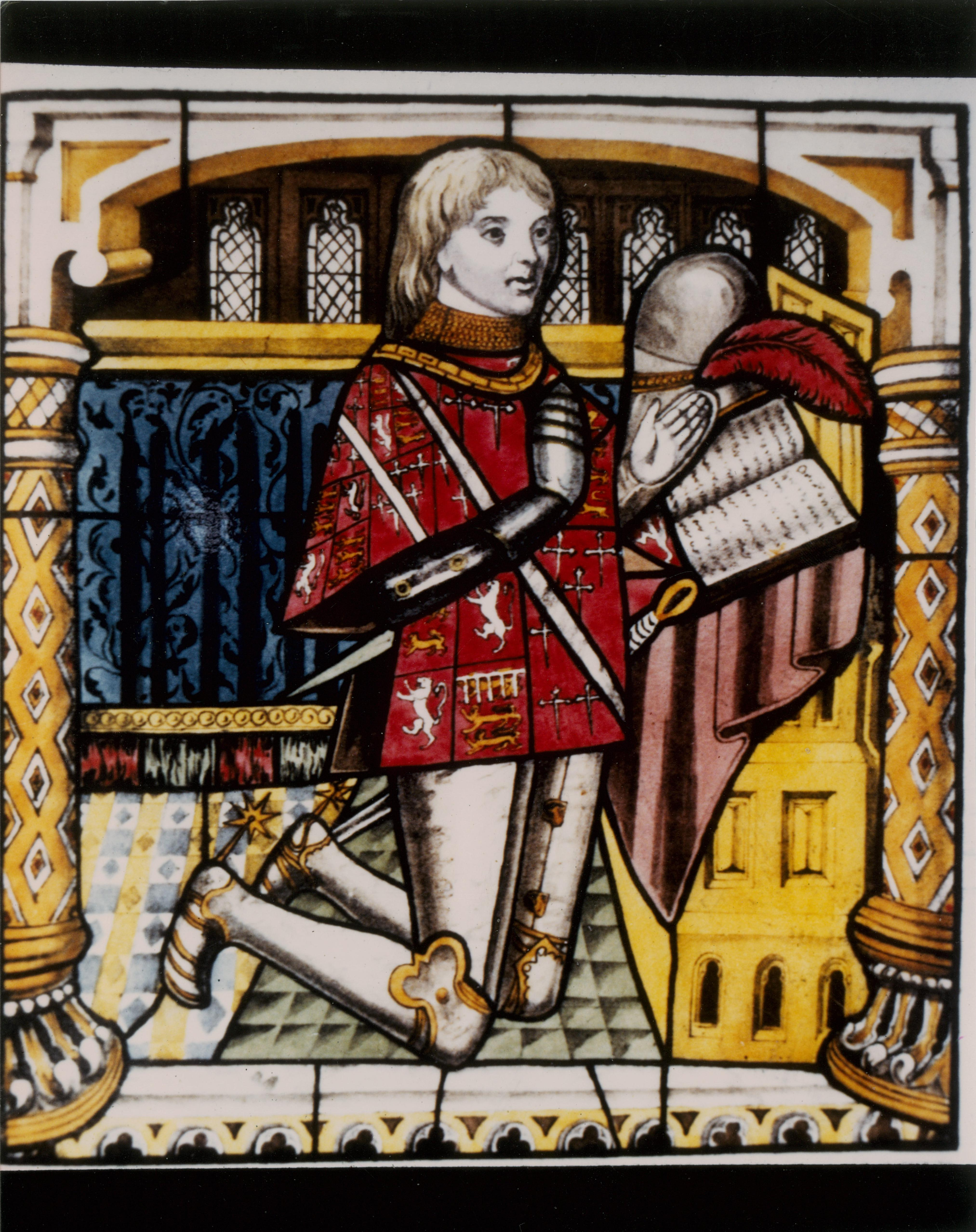
John Howard, 1 st Duke of Norfolk (c.1425-1485). A contemporary image of Howard at prayer from stained glass window, south chapel, St Mary's Church, now lost.

== Parish status ==
The church is in a group of parishes which includes:

- St Matthew's Church, Leavenheath
- St Mary's Church, Polstead

== Organ ==
The church has a two manual pipe organ the origins of which are from an organ of around 1834 by Gray. There has been subsequent renovations and alterations by Gray and Davison, Henry Jones, Rayson and Bishop and Son. A specification of the organ can be found on the National Pipe Organ Register.

== Bells ==
The tower contains 8 bells with a tenor weight of 22cwt in D. Details on the bells as follows:

Bell	Weight	Nominal	Note	Diameter	Dated	Founder	Canons	Turning
1	5-1-2	1177.4	D	29.00"	1956	John Taylor & Co	F	N
2	5-1-21	1112.6	C#	29.88"	1956	John Taylor & Co	F	N
3	6-1-15	985.2	B	32.13"	1956	John Taylor & Co	F	N
4	7-0-23	875.6	A	35.00"	1725	Thomas Gardiner	Y	Y
5	9-3-18	778.8	G	38.38"	c1499†	? John Sturdy	Y	Y
6	14-0-0	739.0	F#	42.38"	c1380†	(unidentified)	R	Y
7	15-1-24	653.8	E	45.75"	1699	Henry Pleasant	Y	Y
8	22-0-12	582.2	D	52.00"	1811	Thomas II Mears	R	Y
