= St Andrew's Church, Westhall =

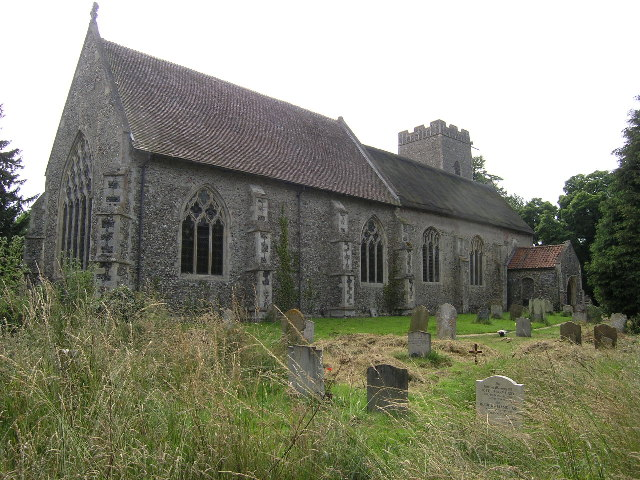
- St Andrew's Church, Westhall
- OS grid reference: TM4232580434
- Location: Church Hill, Westhall, Suffolk IP19 8NU
- Country: England
- Denomination: Anglican
- Churchmanship: Central Anglican

History
- Status: Parish church

Architecture
- Functional status: Active
- Heritage designation: Grade I
- Designated: 1 September 1953
- Architectural type: Church

Administration
- Province: Canterbury
- Diocese: St Edmundsbury and Ipswich
- Archdeaconry: Suffolk
- Deanery: Waveney and Blyth
- Parish: Westhall

St Andrew's Church is located in the village of Westhall near Halesworth. It is an active Anglican parish church in the deanery of Waveney and Blyth, part of the archdeaconry of Suffolk, and the Diocese of St Edmundsbury and Ipswich.

== Layout ==
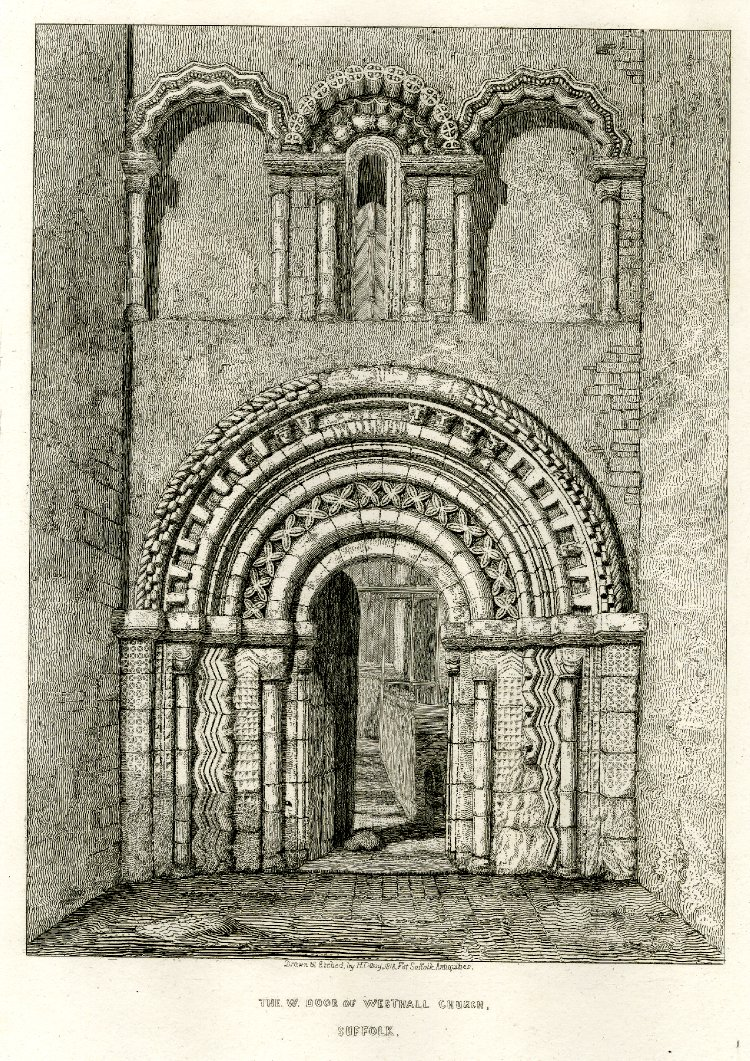
The West door - etching by Henry Davy

The church is of flint construction and comprises a nave, south aisle chancel and tower. The church has a non-standard design and layout. The tower, dating from the 13th century with a post-Reformation bell-stage, splits into both a northern and easterly direction. The eastern section being a Norman construct, while to the north is a large 13th-century thatched nave containing 19th-century pews. Beyond the nave is a 14th-century chancel. The unusual layout is due to the church having been extended from the original Norman building and the original church becoming what is now the church's south aisle. The eastern entrance dates from around 1100 and stonework including depictions of humans and animals including bird head grotesques and human-animal hybrids as well as unfinished faces are still visible.

== Font and screens ==
Located in the nave is a font with eight panels, seven of which are sacramental panels depicting the Sacraments of the Catholic Church. The panel depicting the Eucharistic sacrament was used as the cover illustration for Eamon Duffy's book The Stripping of the Altars. The eighth panel shows the baptism of Christ.

The nave also contains a painted screen depicting various saints. The south side of the screen shows the Saints Etheldreda, Sitha, Agnes, Brigit of Kildare, Catherine of Alexandria, Dorothy, Margaret of Antioch and Apollonia. (Note: Inscribed below each saint on the screen is their name and they are each depicted with associated attributes: Agnes is shown with a wounded throat, inflicted by a sword; Apollonia is holding iron tongs; Brigit is shown with the abbess's crozier and a book; Catherine holds a sword and a book; Dorothy is carrying a basket of white flowers and holds red ones in her other hand; at Margaret's feet is a defeated demon or dragon and she holds a weapon; Sitha holds keys on a chain and carries a bag. Only the right half of the panel bearing Etheldreda's image survives, so that only a small portion of the portrait can be seen.)

The north side of the screen contains images of Saint James, St Leonard, Saint Michael and Saint Clement. Alongside these images on the north side are depictions of the Transfiguration of Jesus. Christ on a mountain top between the two figures of Moses and Elijah. It is the only surviving medieval screen representation of the Transfiguration in England. The final panel on the north side depicts Saint Anthony of Egypt.

== Wall paintings ==
Located on the north wall is a painting of Saint Christopher and other figures including Moses. Other wall paintings include a flower-surrounded consecration cross beside the south door and a niche alcove in the eastern side of a window in the south wall. Alongside the painted niche and consecration cross there are surviving traces of a large painting consisting of seven large roundels surrounded in leafwork.

== Monuments and brass-work ==
In the south-east corner of the church is the tomb of Nicholas Bohun (1602) which includes a brass plaque. On the south wall is the coat of arms of George III. In the chancel are located the remains of two Chalice brasses. The chancel ceiling depicts the Holy Trinity, with God the Father holding the Crucified Christ between his knees.

== Listed status ==
St Andrew's Church was listed at Grade I on 1 September 1953.

== See also ==
- Grade I listed buildings in Suffolk
