= Stoke-by-Nayland (painting) =

Painting by John Constable

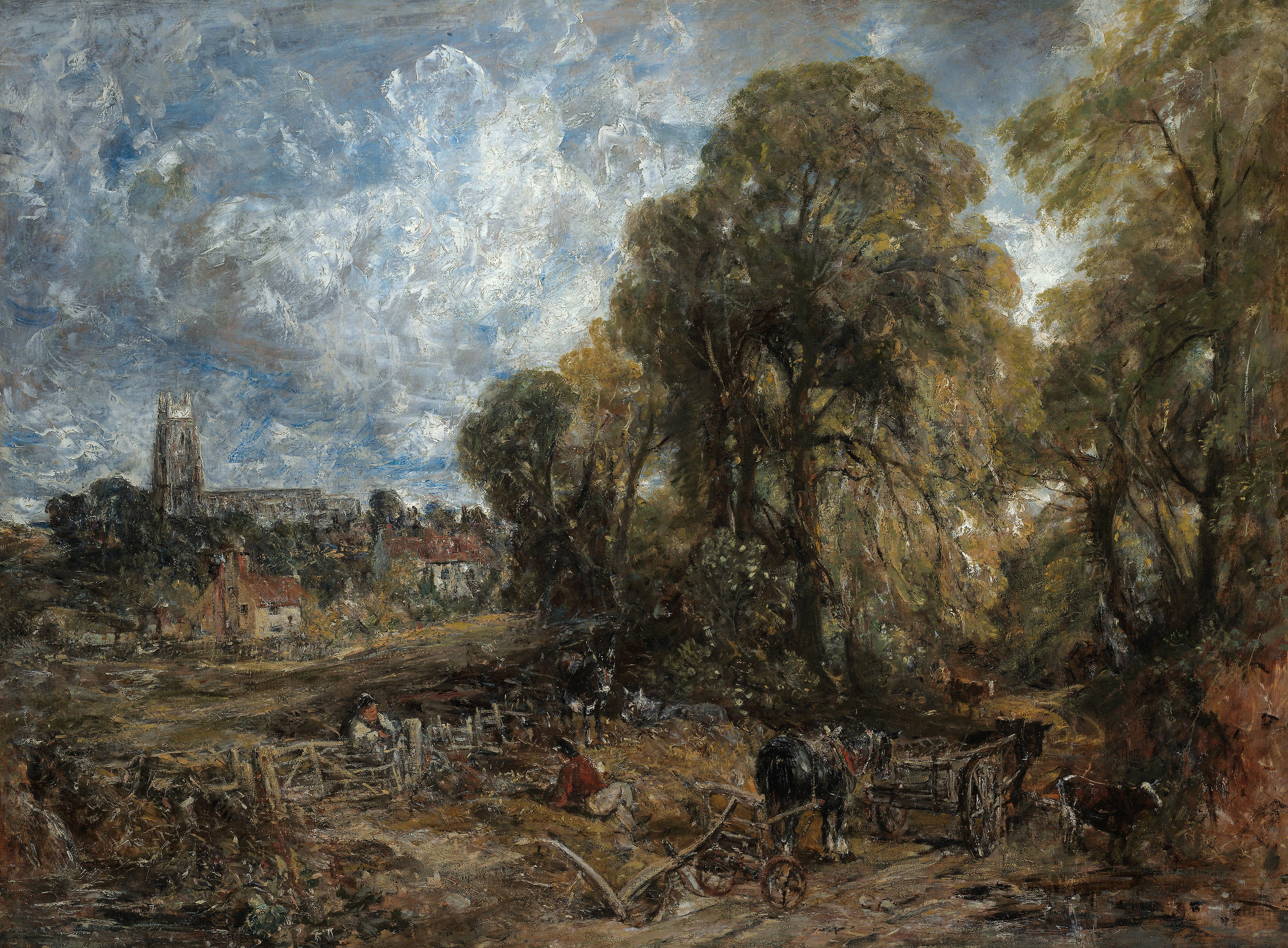
- Artist: John Constable
- Year: c.1836
- Type: Oil on canvas, landscape painting
- Dimensions: 320 cm × 430 cm (126 in × 169 in)
- Location: Art Institute of Chicago; Illinois

Stoke-by-Nayland is a c.1836 landscape painting by the British artist John Constable. It features a view near the village of Stoke-by-Nayland in Suffolk close to the border with Essex. It is located in what became known as Constable Country, as it featured so often in the artist's work. St Mary's Church can be seen on the left.

A large oil sketch, it was prepared on the same scale as Constable's earlier "six-footers". He tended to produce a full-size oil sketch before completing his finished version. Constable likely intended to work it up into a finished painting to display at the Royal Academy Exhibition of 1837. However he died before the Exhibition took place. The sketch is now in the collection of the Art Institute of Chicago, having been acquired in 1922.

== See also ==
- List of paintings by John Constable

== Bibliography ==
- Concannon, Amy (ed.) Turner and Constable: Rivals and Originals. Tate Publishing, 2025.
- Druick, Douglas. Master Paintings in the Art Institute of Chicago. Yale University Press, 2013.
