= Metfield =

Village in Suffolk, England

Coordinates: 52°22′20″N 1°22′06″E

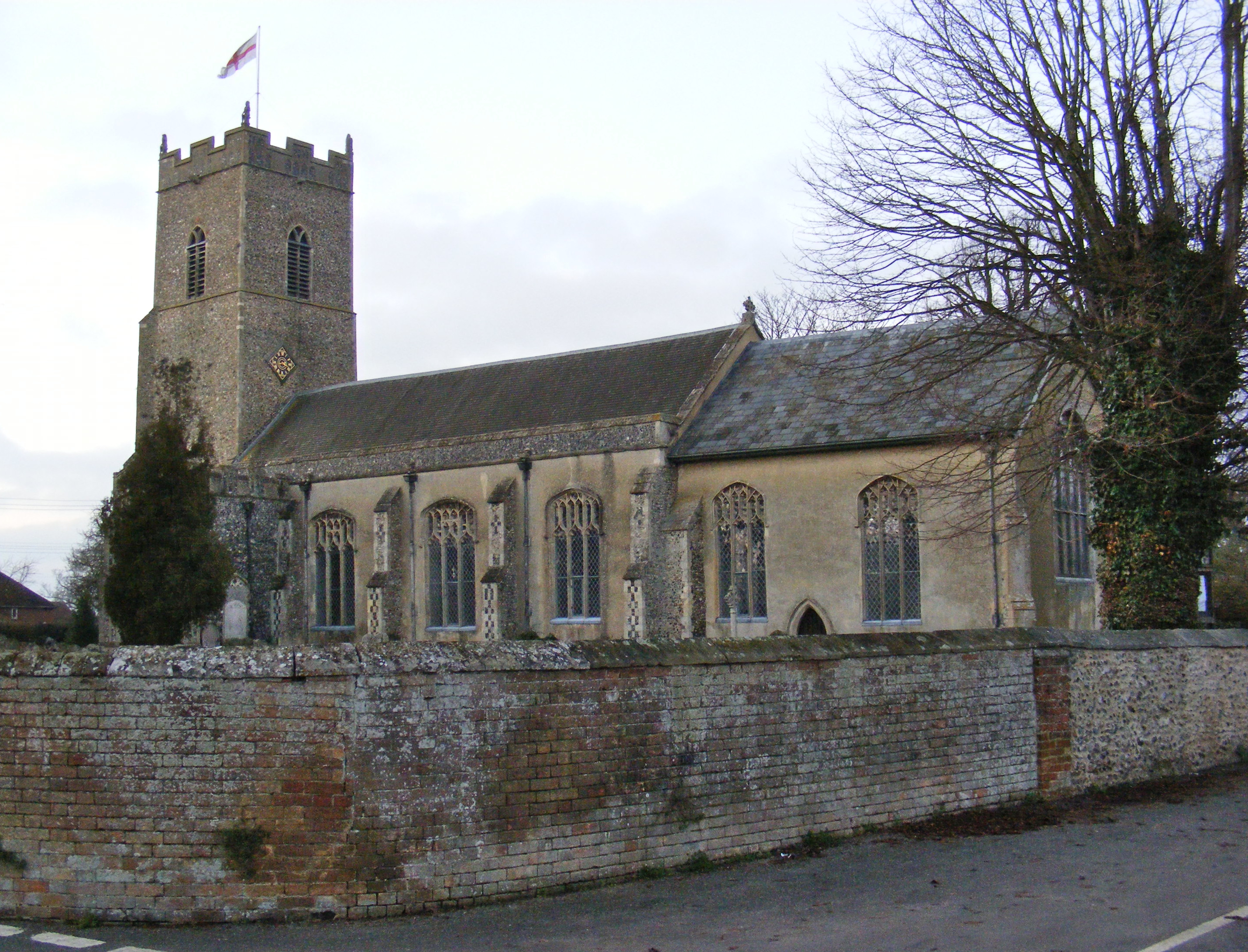
- Church of St. John the Baptist

- Location within Suffolk
- Population: 388 (2011)
- Civil parish: Metfield
- District: Mid Suffolk
- Shire county: Suffolk
- Region: East
- Country: England
- Sovereign state: United Kingdom
- Post town: HARLESTON
- Postcode district: IP20
- Dialling code: 01379
- UK Parliament: Waveney Valley

Metfield is a village and civil parish in the Mid Suffolk district, in Suffolk, England, but its name is derived from Medefeld or 'Meadow feld' (see Concise Oxford Dictionary of English Place Names). It is situated close to the border with Norfolk, being approximately 5 miles south east of Harleston and 7 miles north west of Halesworth. The population was estimated to be 370 in 1996, increasing to 388 at the 2011 Census.

== History ==
The parish was part of the historic Hoxne Hundred.

The parish church is the 13th-century church of St. John the Baptist, which was extensively remodelled in the 15th century. St. John the Baptist has a sister parish in Medfield, Massachusetts in the United States, the Church of the Advent. The town is named after Metfield.

In 1885 a provisional order reallocated part of the neighbouring parish of Withersdale to Metfield resulting in the parish encompassing 2,338 acres. In 1901 the population was recorded as 437.

During World War II an airfield was built just outside Metfield for use by the USAAF 491st Bomb Group and the 353d Fighter Group. On 15 July 1944 a bomb dump blew up, detonating over 1,000 tons of bombs and explosive, killing five men and wrecking five B-24 bombers.

The local economy is mainly agricultural with some light industry.

The village now has its own website at metfieldsuffolk.com .

In November 2017, local author Christine Brennan published her book METFIELD Tales From a Suffolk Village 1928–2017.

Nearby villages include Cratfield.
