= St Mary's Church, Great Blakenham =

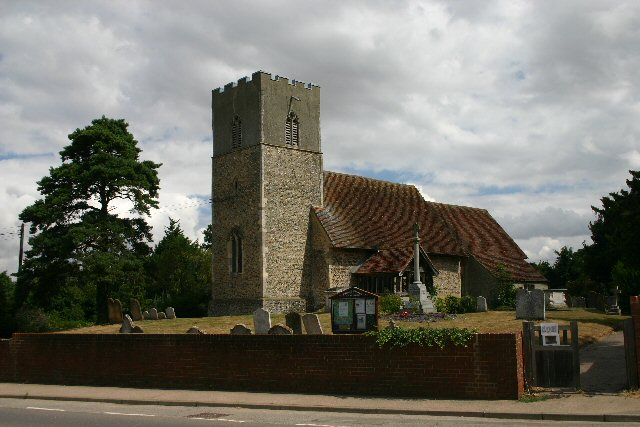

- Location in Suffolk
- 52.1152°N 1.0921°E
- OS grid reference: TM1180850827
- Location: 92 Stowmarket Road, Great Blakenham, Suffolk IP6 0LQ
- Country: England
- Denomination: Anglican
- Churchmanship: Central Anglican

History
- Status: Parish church

Architecture
- Functional status: Active
- Heritage designation: Grade I
- Designated: 9 December 1955
- Architectural type: Church

Administration
- Province: Canterbury
- Diocese: St Edmundsbury and Ipswich
- Archdeaconry: Ipswich
- Deanery: Gipping Valley
- Parish: Great Blakenham

St Mary's Church is located in the village of Great Blakenham near Ipswich. It is an active Anglican parish church in the deanery of Bosmere, part of the archdeaconry of Ipswich, and the Diocese of St Edmundsbury and Ipswich.

St Mary's Church was listed at Grade I on 9 December 1955.

== See also ==
- Grade I listed buildings in Suffolk
