= St Peter's Church, Claydon =

Coordinates: 52.1056°N 1.1195°E

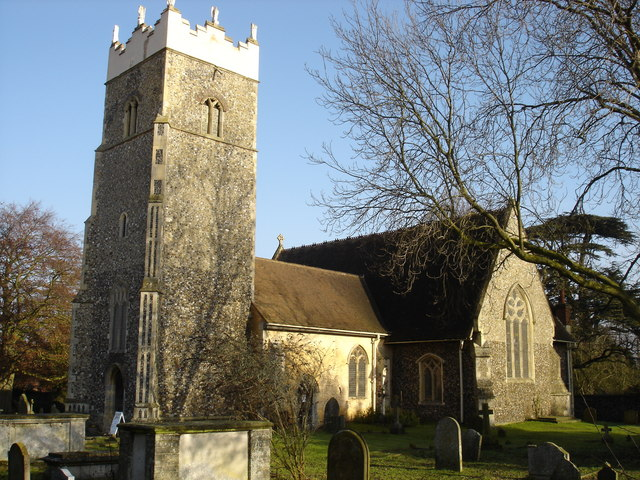
- St Peter's Church seen from the southwest

- Location in Suffolk
- OS grid reference: NZ274513
- Location: Claydon, Suffolk
- Country: England
- Denomination: Church of England
- Churchmanship: Anglo-Catholicism
- Website: Churches Conservation Trust St Peter's Church, Claydon, Suffolk

History
- Dedication: Saint Peter

Architecture
- Functional status: Redundant
- Heritage designation: Grade I
- Designated: 9 December 1955
- Architect: Richard Phipson (restoration)
- Architectural type: Church
- Style: Anglo-Saxon, Gothic, Gothic Revival
- Completed: 1852

Specifications
- Materials: Flint with limestone dressings; tile roofs

St Peter's Church is a redundant Church of England parish church in Claydon, Suffolk, England. It is a Grade I listed building, and is in the care of the Churches Conservation Trust. It overlooks the Gipping valley.

== History ==
The earliest fabric in the church is in the nave, which is 10th- or 11th-century. The east window is from the 14th century, and the tower was added in the 15th century. Also around this time the north porch was built and doorways and windows in the nave were replaced.

A major restoration was carried out in 1852 under the direction of the then rector, The high churchman Rev George Drury, working with the architect Richard Phipson. Until then the church had consisted of a nave, a chancel, a west tower and a north porch. The restoration included virtually rebuilding the chancel and adding the transepts and organ chambers. Much of the joinery of the transept roofs and fittings was carried out by Henry Ringham. It is thought that some of the stained glass in the east window was designed by Rev Drury.

The church was declared redundant in 1977 but it was not vested in the Churches Conservation Trust until 11 years later.

== Architecture ==
The church is built of flint, parts of which have been rendered, with limestone dressings. The roofs are tiled. The church has a short nave with a north porch, north and south transepts, a chancel, a vestry, and a west tower.

The nave seems to be Anglo-Saxon, indicated by characteristic long-and-short quoins at the western corners. The tower is Perpendicular, and the parts restored in the 19th century are in a Decorated style. The tower has a battlemented parapet on which are seven limestone statues. There were originally eight, but one is missing. It is supported by buttresses decorated with flushwork. The nave contains moulded north and south doorways. The rear arch in the south doorway is round-headed. The nave roof is in three bays. The transept roofs contain carved bosses.

The octagonal limestone font dates from about 1400. The rest of the fittings date from the 19th-century restoration. These include the pulpit with its elaborate pierced tracery. The two-manual organ was built in 1863 by Bevington.

== See also ==
- List of churches preserved by the Churches Conservation Trust in the East of England
