= Westhall =

Village in Suffolk, England

Coordinates: 52.378°N 1.546°E

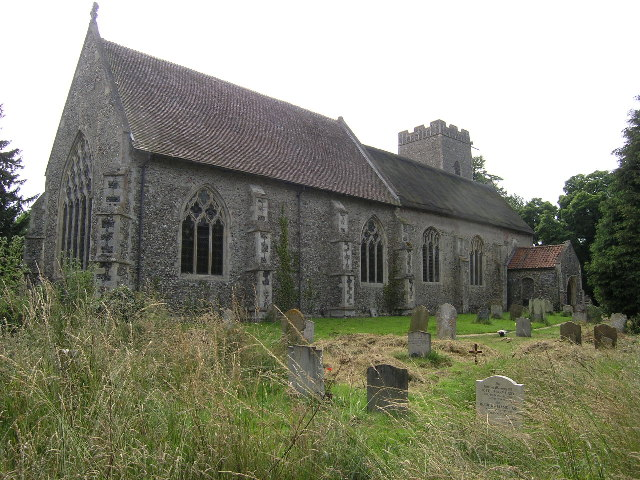
- Westhall, Church of St Andrew

- Location within Suffolk
- OS grid reference: TM415815
- District: East Suffolk
- Shire county: Suffolk
- Region: East
- Country: England
- Sovereign state: United Kingdom
- Post town: Halesworth
- Postcode district: IP19
- Dialling code: 01502
- UK Parliament: Suffolk Coastal

Westhall is a village and civil parish in the East Suffolk district, in the county Suffolk, England about 3 miles (5 km) north east of Halesworth, 1 mile (1.6 km) south west of Brampton and 5 miles (8 km) south of Beccles, close to the A145. The mid-2005 population estimate for Westhall parish was 390. Sotherton is located to the south east and Holton to the south west.

The village church, which dates from Norman times, is dedicated to St Andrew and is a Grade I listed building. Westhall has a village pub, the Racehorse Inn.

== See also ==
- Grade I listed buildings in East Suffolk District
