= Barham, Suffolk =

Village in Suffolk, England

Coordinates: 52.118°N 1.105°E

Barham
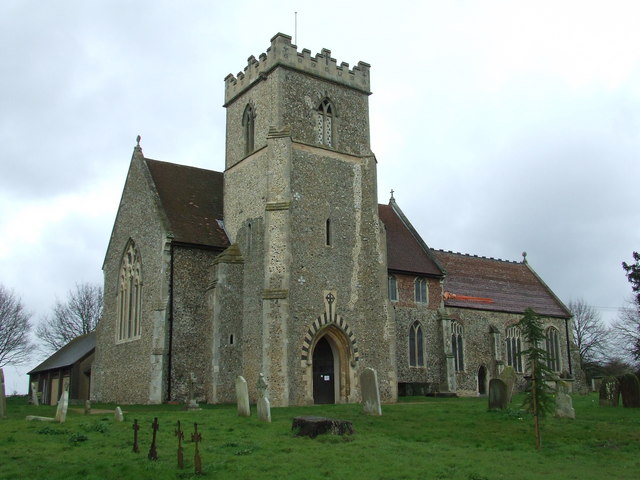
- St Mary and St Peter, Barham

- Location within Suffolk
- Interactive map of Barham
- Population: 1,504 (2011 census)
- OS grid reference: TM141513
- District: Mid Suffolk
- Shire county: Suffolk
- Region: East
- Country: England
- Sovereign state: United Kingdom
- Post town: IPSWICH
- Postcode district: IP6
- Dialling code: 01473

Barham is a village and civil parish in the Mid Suffolk district of Suffolk, England. The village is on the River Gipping. Surrounded by Great Blakenham, Baylham, Coddenham, Henley and Claydon, Barham is on the A14 road about six miles north of Ipswich. Barham has one pub – The Sorrel Horse – and is also known for the Gaps Fishing lakes, situated next to the Barham Picnic site on Pesthouse Lane.

== History ==
In 1901 the population was 449, and the parish covered 1 806 acres.

== Geography ==
The Barham Picnic site covers an area of 2.89 hectares and consists of a children's play area, car park, purpose-built toilets facilities and a visitors centre. The area was designated by the Suffolk county council as a public right of way location to safeguard the future use of the site.
