= Ashbocking =

Village in Suffolk, England

Coordinates: 52.146369°N 1.192063°E

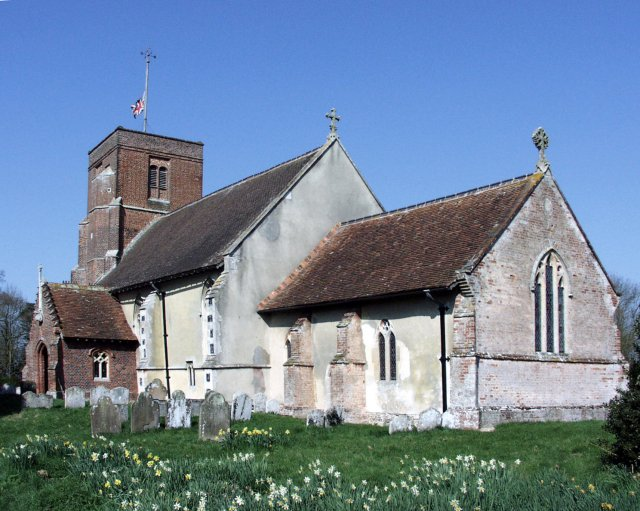
- All Saints' Church, Ashbocking

- Location within Suffolk
- Interactive map of Ashbocking
- Population: 356 (2011)
- OS grid reference: TM1654
- District: Mid Suffolk
- Shire county: Suffolk
- Region: East
- Country: England
- Sovereign state: United Kingdom
- Post town: Ipswich
- Postcode district: IP6
- Police: Suffolk
- Fire: Suffolk
- Ambulance: East of England

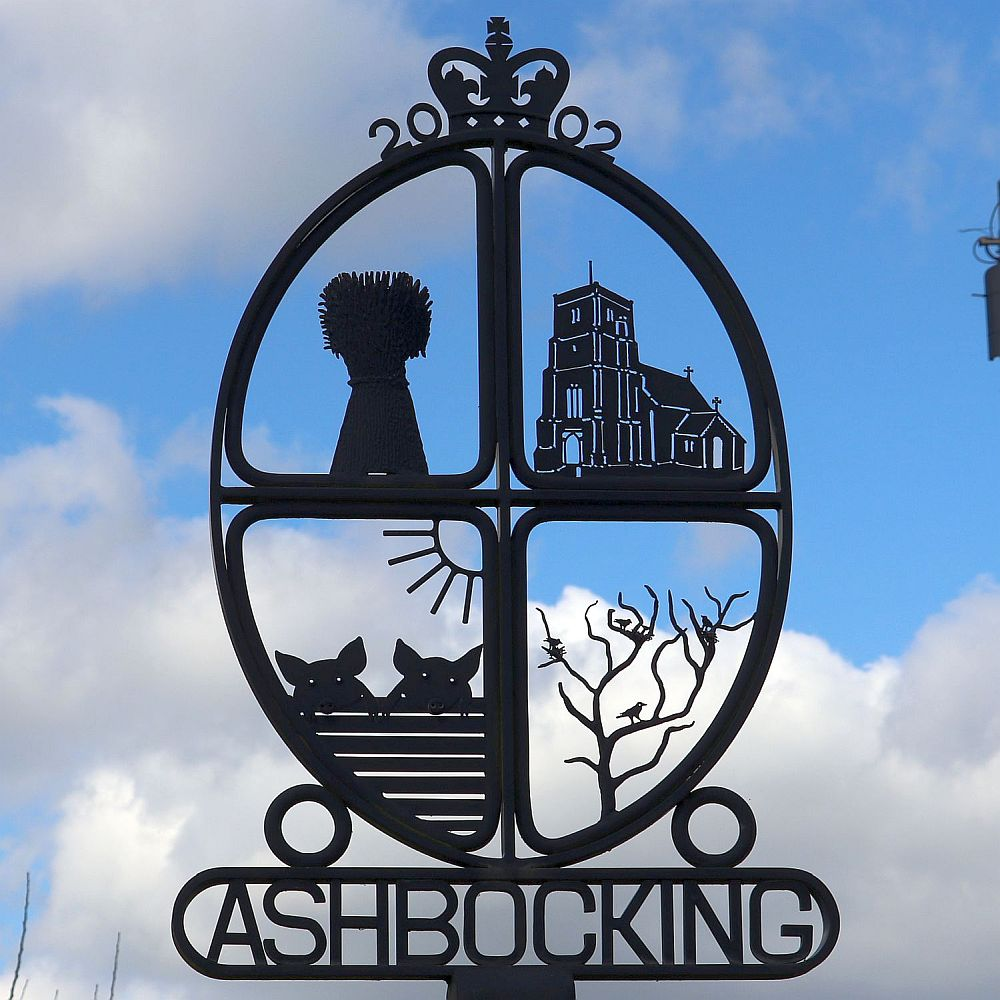
Ashbocking village sign

Ashbocking is a village and civil parish in the Mid Suffolk district of Suffolk, England. The village is about seven miles north of Ipswich, and according to the 2001 census had a population of 318, increasing to 356 at the 2011 Census.

The village's name means 'Ash-tree', with the 'de Bocking' family name (probably from Bocking, Essex) added later.

In 1326, All Saints' Church, Ashbocking was impropriated to the monastery of Christ Church, Canterbury. After the Reformation, the patronage of the church passed to the Lord Chancellor. The church building dates back to the 14th century with later additions, and was remodelled in 1872.

The lords of the manor were the Tollemache family of Helmingham Hall. Ashbocking Hall on Church Lane is a Grade II* listed building, with the remains of a medieval moat. The original half-timbered house dates back to the early 16th century, with later additions.

In 1901 the population was 289, and the parish covered 1 408 acres.

Peter Harold Wright, a recipient of the Victoria Cross during the Second World War, is buried in All Saints' churchyard.
