= St Peter's Church, Henley =

Coordinates: 52.1181°N 1.1516°E

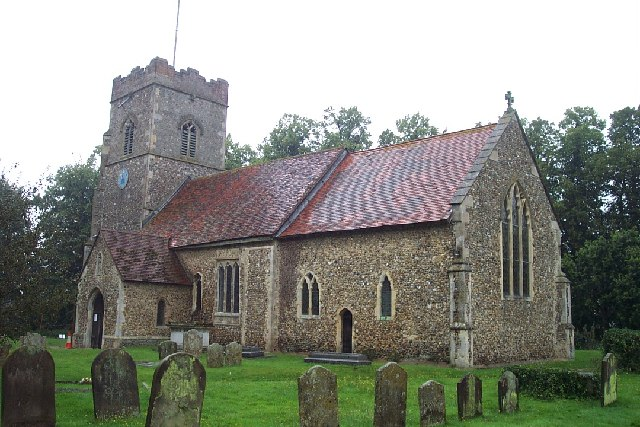
- Church of St Peter

- Location in Suffolk
- OS grid reference: TM158,513
- Location: Church Lane, Henley, Suffolk IP6 0QT
- Country: England
- Denomination: Anglican
- Churchmanship: Central Anglican
- Website: https://claydonchurches.com

History
- Status: Parish church

Architecture
- Functional status: Active
- Heritage designation: Grade I
- Designated: 9 December 1955
- Architectural type: Church

Administration
- Province: Canterbury
- Diocese: St Edmundsbury and Ipswich
- Archdeaconry: Ipswich
- Deanery: Bosmere
- Parish: Henley

Clergy
- Priest: Cathy Austin

St Peter's Church is located in the village of Henley near Ipswich. It is an active Anglican parish church in the Gipping Valley deanery, part of the archdeaconry of Ipswich, and the Diocese of St Edmundsbury and Ipswich.

== History ==
The Church is a Grade I listed building in the village of Henley.

The building includes features dating from the 13th century such as the south door of the church through to more modern work including a nineteenth century addition of a parish room.

The tower contains a ring of eight bells dating from between 1480 and 1902. In 1972 the frames were renovated and the bells rehung. An additional bell for the clock on the tower was installed in 1976 previously having been held in a church at Ubbeston.

== See also ==
- Grade I listed buildings in Suffolk

Media related to St Peter's Church, Henley at Wikimedia Commons
