= Claydon, Suffolk =

Village in Suffolk, England

Coordinates: 52.10729°N 1.10898°E

Claydon
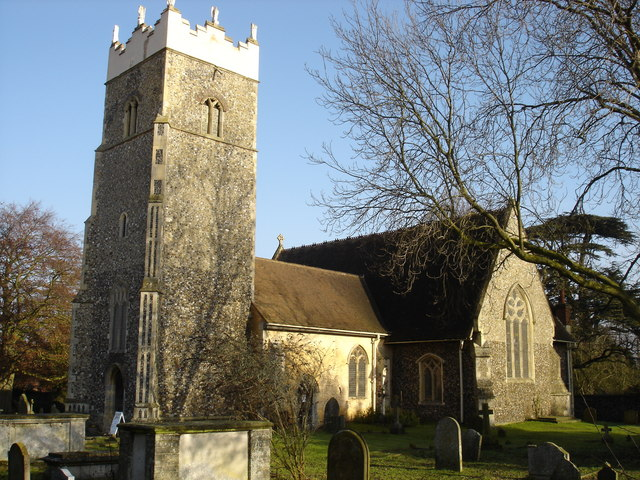
- Church of St Peter

- Location within Suffolk
- Population: 2,197 (2011)
- OS grid reference: TM1350
- District: Mid Suffolk
- Shire county: Suffolk
- Region: East
- Country: England
- Sovereign state: United Kingdom
- Post town: IPSWICH
- Postcode district: IP6
- Dialling code: 01473
- Police: Suffolk
- Fire: Suffolk
- Ambulance: East of England
- UK Parliament: Central Suffolk and North Ipswich

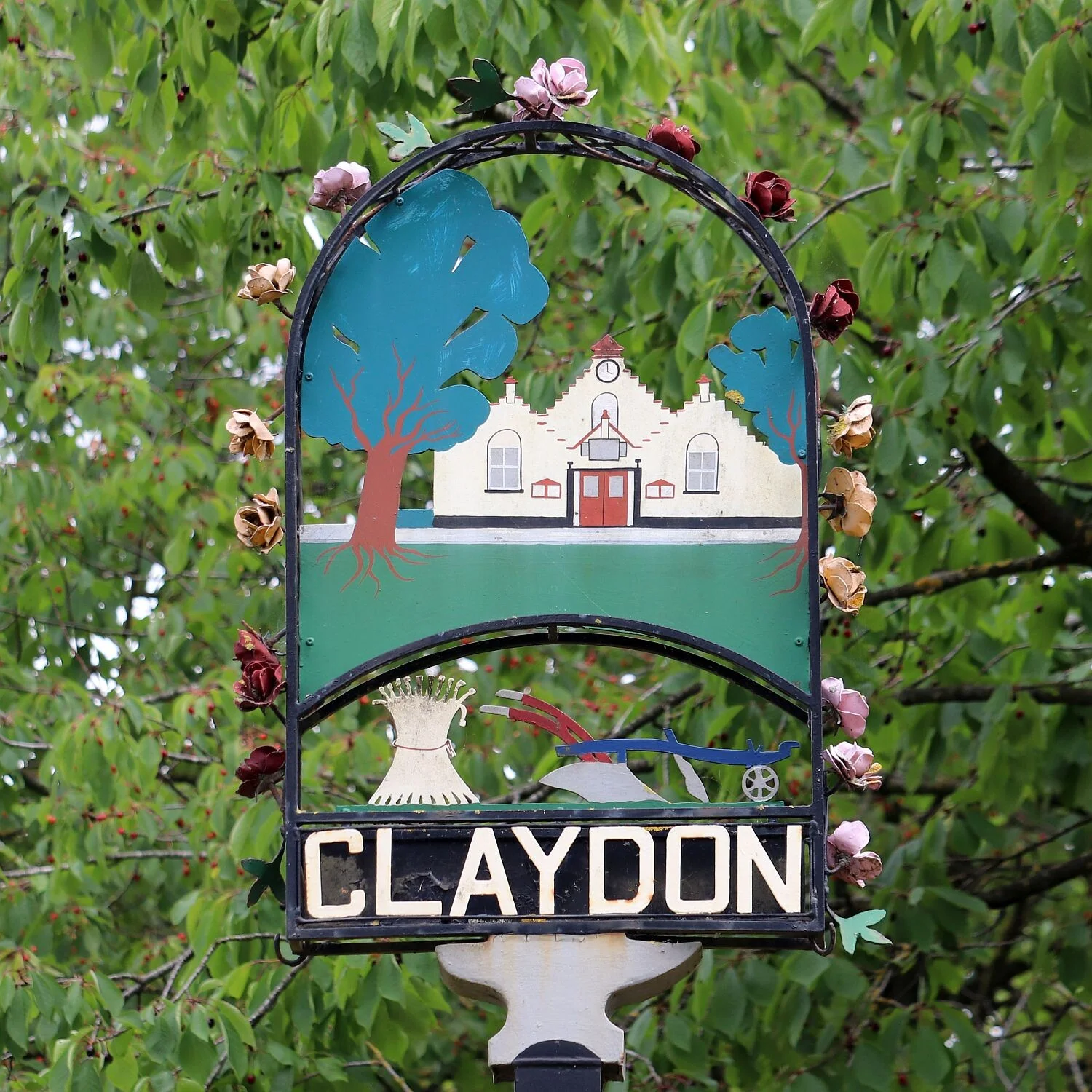
Claydon Village Sign

Claydon is a village just north of Ipswich in Suffolk, England. The meaning of the name is "clay-on-the-hill".

The village gives its name to the hundred of Bosmere-and-Claydon, one of the 21 administrative districts into which Suffolk was divided for administrative purposes between Saxon and Victorian times.

== Geography ==
The countryside around Claydon is set among low-lying hills and lies next to the River Gipping. It is close to the intersection of the A14 and the B1113. Between the A14 and the B1113 (former A45) is the Ipswich to Ely Line.

== Amenities ==
The village has two pubs: The Crown and The Greyhound. There is also a bakers and sandwich bar Freshfills, post office, fish and chip shop, hotel, hairdressers, car dealership and travel agency. It also has a primary school and Claydon High School. There are regular bus connections to Ipswich, Bramford and Stowmarket from the centre of the village.

At the top of the hill on Church Lane can be found the Church of St Peter, which has been partially restored. It is one of the few pre-Norman churches in Suffolk. The interior contains a wooden fan-vaulted ceiling.

Nearby villages include Barham, Bramford, Great Blakenham and the hamlet of Akenham.

== Former fuel storage depot ==
An Air Force distribution depot was constructed around 1939 by Shell-Mex & BP for the Air Ministry. It received fuel by rail and distributed it by road tanker. In the 1970s two new sites were constructed with modern storage tanks and pump-houses. It was connected to the Government Pipeline and Storage System and supplied RAF Bentwaters and Woodbridge. The wartime site was sold off in the mid-2000s and later demolished. The other two sites are no longer operational.
