= Silvanigrella aquatica =

Scientific classification
- Domain: Bacteria
- Kingdom: Pseudomonadati
- Phylum: Bdellovibrionota
- Class: Oligoflexia
- Order: Silvanigrellales
- Family: Silvanigrellaceae
- Genus: Silvanigrella
- Species: S. aquatica

Binomial name
- Silvanigrella aquatica Hahn et al. 2017

Species of bacterium

Silvanigrella aquatica is a bacterial species of the phylum Bdellovibrionota. The type strain was isolated from the small lake Nonnenmattweiher located in the Southern Black Forest in Germany. This species is currently the only species in the genus Silvanigrella, which is the only genus in the family Silvanigrellaceae, which is the only family in the order Silvanigrellales. The order Silvanigrellales is one of only two orders in the class Oligoflexia. The type strain MWH-Nonnen-W8red is remarkable due to its low GC content, its pigmentation and its plastic morphology. Of further interest is the relative close relationship of S. aquatica to "Spirobacillus cienkowskii" (Metchnikoff 1889) known as pathogens of daphnids (Daphnia), which are commonly called water fleas. However, S. aquatica is assumed to be a non-pathogenic free-living species. The genome of the type strain was sequenced,
