= Fairclough =

Fairclough is a surname. A variant form is Faircloth. Notable people with the surname include:

- Adam Fairclough (historian), British historian of the United States
- Anna Fairclough (born 1957), member of the Alaska House of Representatives
- Arthur Fairclough (manager) (born 1873), Soccer manager
- Arthur Bradfield Fairclough (1896–1968), Canadian First World War flying ace
- Ben Fairclough (born 1989), English soccer player
- Chris Fairclough (born 1964), soccer player
- David Fairclough (born 1957), Liverpool footballer in the 1970s
- Dennis Fairclough, Computing & Networking professor
- Ellen Fairclough (1905–2004), first female member of the Canadian Cabinet
- Eric Fairclough, Canadian politician
- Leonard Fairclough (1853–1927), English stonemason
  - founder of Leonard Fairclough & Son, a construction firm
- Les Fairclough (1902–1951), English professional rugby league player
- Lora Fairclough (born 1970), English professional golfer
- Mick Fairclough (born 1952), Irish professional soccer player
- Norman Fairclough (born 1941), linguist
- Paul Fairclough (born 1950), soccer manager
- Percy Fairclough (1858–1947), English amateur footballer
- Peter Fairclough (cricketer) (1887–1952), English cricketer
- Peter Fairclough (footballer) (1893–1953), English footballer
- Peter Fairclough (musician) (b. 1956), English jazz drummer, instructor at the Liverpool Institute for Performing Arts
- Richard Fairclough (divine) (1621–1682), nonconformist divine
- Samuel Fairclough (1594–1677), English nonconformist divine
- Wilfred Fairclough (1907–1996), English artist, engraver and printmaker.

== Fictional characters ==
- Len Fairclough, character in the soap opera Coronation Street
- Rita Fairclough, character in the soap opera Coronation Street
- Stanley Fairclough, character in the soap opera Coronation Street

== See also ==
- Fairclough Homes, UK housebuilder part of Centex Corporation
