= Micavibrio aeruginosavorus =

Scientific classification
- Domain: Bacteria
- Phylum: Pseudomonadota
- Class: Bdellovibrionia
- Order: Bdellovibrionales
- Family: Bdellovibrionaceae
- Genus: Micavibrio
- Species: M. aeruginosavorus

Binomial name
- Micavibrio aeruginosavorus Lambina et al. 1983

Species of bacterium

Micavibrio aeruginosavorus is a species of epibiotic predatory bacteria. Unlike Bdellovibrio, Micavibrio do not invade the periplasmic space of their prey, but feed by attaching themselves to its surface.

Micavibrio aeruginosavorus was initially discovered while searching for traces of the bacteria species Bdellovibrio in wastewater. Similar to Bdellovibrio, M. aeruginosavorus was also found to have predatory tendencies against other bacteria, however the way that aeruginosavorus consumes its prey differs from Bdellovibrio in distinct ways. M. aeruginosavorus seek out their prey, primarily Pseudomonas aeruginosa, and attach to their cell wall using. Once attached, the predatory bacteria uses a specialized enzyme called Bdellovibrio-like protein (BLP) which allows it to break down the cell wall of P. Aeruginosa consumes the contents of the prey cell. This essentially kills the prey cell while allowing the predator cell to grow and reproduce. During this process the predatory bacterium is free to move to a new host cell whenever it has expended the resources of the original cell. This differs from Bdellovibrio as those bacteria use pili to enter the space between the cell membrane and the cell wall of the host bacterium. Once inside the Bdellovibrio will replicate using the resources of the host cell until it is entirely broken down and a complete life cycle has passed, only then can the Bdellovibrio move on to a new host cell. While the medicinal use of predatory bacteria is still in an experimental phase, there have been some promising studies that show its usefulness as a tool against multidrug resistant infections. Predatory bacteria have been determined to attack bacteria of the genus Acinetobacter, Aeromonas, Bordetella, Burkholderia, Citrobacter, Enterobacter, Escherichia, Klebsiella, Listonella, Morganella, Proteus, Pseudomonas, Salmonella, Serratia, Shigella, Vibrio and Yersinia. A 2007 study found that Micavibrio aeruginosavorus was effective against reducing biofilm build up. This is an important development as biofilms that build up after surgical implants can be up to 1,000 more resistant to antibiotic medications, which could lead to devastating infections in these patients. The safety of using predatory bacteria as medication is still being determined via in vivo and in vitro experimentation. A 2015 study found both the intravenous and respiratory administration of M. aeruginosavorus and B. bacteriovorus to rats to be relatively safe. While some reactions, including some inflammation and inflammatory cytokines, were detected they subsided within 24 hours and no lasting tissue damage was observed. Additionally, it was found that the predatory bacteria were safely and effectively eliminated from the body.
