= Silvanigrella =

Scientific classification
- Domain: Bacteria
- Kingdom: Pseudomonadati
- Phylum: Bdellovibrionota
- Class: Oligoflexia
- Order: Silvanigrellales
- Family: Silvanigrellaceae
- Genus: Silvanigrella; Hahn et al. 2017

Type species
- Silvanigrella aquatica Hahn et al. 2017

Species
- S. aquatica; S. paludirubra

Genus of bacteria

Silvanigrella is a genus of the phylum Bdellovibrionota. The genus currently contains two described species: Silvanigrella aquatica and Silvanigrella paludirubra.

== Phylogeny ==
The currently accepted taxonomy is based on the List of Prokaryotic names with Standing in Nomenclature (LPSN) and National Center for Biotechnology Information (NCBI).

16S rRNA based LTP_10_2024

- - Fluviispira
    - F. multicolorata
    - F. sanaruensis
  - Silvanigrella
    - S. aquatica
    - - S. paludirubra
      - "Pigmentibacter ruber"

120 marker proteins based GTDB 09-RS220

- Silvanigrella
  - - Fluviispira multicolorata Pitt et al 2020
    - - Fluviispira sanaruensis Maejima et al. 2021
      - Fluviispira vulneris Tang et al. 2025
  - - "Pigmentibacter ruber" Peng et al. 2021
    - - "Ca. Spirobacillus cienkowskii" Metchnikoff 1889 ex Bresciani et al. 2018
      - - S. aquatica Hahn et al. 2017
        - S. paludirubra Pitt et al. 2020

== See also ==
- List of bacterial orders
- List of bacteria genera
