= Bacteriovorax =

Scientific classification
- Domain: Bacteria
- Kingdom: Pseudomonadati
- Phylum: Bdellovibrionota
- Class: Bacteriovoracia
- Order: Bacteriovoracales
- Family: Bacteriovoracaceae
- Genus: Bacteriovorax; Baer et al. 2000

Type species
- Bacteriovorax stolpii (Seideler, Mandel & Baptist 1972) Baer et al. 2000

Species
- B. stolpii

Synonyms
- Bacteriolyticum Piñeiro, Williams & Stine 2008; Bdellovibrio stolpii Seideler, Mandel & Baptist 1972; Bacteriolyticum stolpii (Seideler, Mandel & Baptist 1972) Piñeiro, Williams & Stine 2008

Genus of bacteria

Bacteriovorax is a genus containing a single species of bacterium in the family Bacteriovoracaceae, Bacteriovorax stolpii. It is a predator that feeds on larger Gram-negative bacteria. These prey bacteria tend to live in enteric environments and have similar lipopolysaccharide structures. Bacteriovorax stolpii recognizes its prey by outer membrane protein receptors, which explains why Gram-positive bacteria that lack outer membranes do not serve as prey. They prey on bacteria by invading the interperiplasmic space where they feed, grow, and reproduce. Bacteriovorax stolpii used to be classified in the genus Bdellovibrio because of similar morphologies and lifestyle characteristics, however they were recognized as a new genus through phylogenetic analysis.

== Characteristics ==
The genera Bacteriovorax and Bdellovibrio share numerous morphological and lifestyle characteristics. Bacteriovorax and similar genera are recognized by their presence of sphingolipids, which are not widely distributed in prokaryotes. Bacteriovorax stolpii is known for the presence of sphinophosphonolipids in its membranes. The genome size of the genus Bacteriovorax has been noted from 2.0–2.6 Mb. Bacteriovorax is only predatory to Gram-negative bacteria, though they have been found in the gut of humans. Bacteriovorax and Bdellovibrio are approximately 0.2-0.4 x 0.5-1.4 μm, are aerobic, with oxygen as a terminal electron acceptor, and are mesophilic. They display a typical Gram-negative morphology and are motile by a single, polar, sheathed flagellum.

== History ==
The description of Bacteriovorax stolpii is based on the original description by Seidler et al. Strain Uki2T is the only isolate described at this time and is the type strain of Bacteriovorax stolpii. This isolate has a GC content of 41±8 mol%. The optimal temperature range for growth of this organism is 15–35 °C. The major cellular fatty acids are 5:1ω8c13:0 and 13:0iso. Uki2T is sensitive to most antibiotics tested (penicillin, streptomycin, neomycin, kanamycin, gentamicin, methicillin, nalidixic acid, pteridine 0/129 and vancomycin).

== Life cycle ==
Members of the Bacteriovorax exhibit the same general morphological and life cycle features as described for the genus Bdellovibrio. In addition, members of this genus exhibit a biphasic life cycle, with the potential of displaying an actively predacious form as well as a PI (predatory independent), saprophytic form capable of growing on nutrient medium. Prey-dependent (wild-type) strains are comma-shaped rods, 0±5–1±4 μm in length, which demonstrate a predatory lifestyle in the presence of susceptible prey bacteria. The wild-type strains are motile by a single, polar flagellum. PI cells (mutants) are pleomorphic, demonstrating a range of cell shapes from simple rods to long, tightly spiral shaped cells.

== Reclassification ==
Most bacteria that prey on Gram-negative bacteria were lumped together in the genus Bdellovibrio. This was done regardless of their isolation from various habitats and unstudied phylogenetic relatedness. The previously wide genus included differences in sodium chloride tolerance and %G+C content. Bacteriovorax stolpii and Bacteriovorax starrii were compared to Bdellovibrio bacteriovorus, the model bacterium for its genus, using 16S rDNA sequences and analyses. There was only 81.7% 16S rDNA sequence similarity between Bdellovibrio bacteriovorus and Bacteriovorax stolpii. DNA-DNA hybridization also only yielded <4% hybridization between the species. On these findings, the genus Bacteriovorax was created and Bacteriovorax stolpii and Bacteriovorax starrii moved into it. In 2015, Bacteriovorax marinus and Bacteriovorax litoralis were reclassified as Halobacteriovorax, leaving B. stolpii as the only species in the genus.

== See also ==
- List of bacterial orders
- List of bacteria genera
