= Richard Fairclough =

Richard Fairclough may refer to:

- Richard Fairclough (divine) (died 1682)
- Daniel Featley (died 1645), sometimes called Richard Fairclough
