= Bacteriovoracaceae =

Scientific classification
- Domain: Bacteria
- Kingdom: Pseudomonadati
- Phylum: Bdellovibrionota
- Class: Bacteriovoracia
- Order: Bacteriovoracales
- Family: Bacteriovoracaceae; Davidov & Jurkevitch 2004

Genera
- Bacteriovorax; Halobacteriovorax; Peredibacter

Synonyms
- Halobacteriovoraceae corrig. Koval, Williams & Stine 2015; Peredibacteraceae Pineiro, Williams & Stine 2008

Family of bacteria

Bacteriovoracaceae is a family of gram-negative, comma-shaped bacteria. All members have a two-part life cycle consisting of a free-living motile "attack phase" and a "predatory phase" that lives in the periplasm of other gram-negative bacteria. Bacteriovoracaceae are found in freshwater and in the soil.

== Phylogeny ==
The currently accepted taxonomy is based on the List of Prokaryotic names with Standing in Nomenclature (LPSN) and National Center for Biotechnology Information (NCBI).

16S rRNA based LTP_10_2024

- - - Peredibacteraceae
      Peredibacter Davidov & Jurkevitch 2004
  - - Bacteriovoracaceae
      Bacteriovorax Baer et al. 2000
    - Halobacteriovoracaceae
      Halobacteriovorax Koval, Williams & Stine 2015

120 marker proteins based GTDB 10-RS226

- Bacteriovoracaceae
  - Peredibacter
  - - Bacteriovorax
    - Halobacteriovorax
