= Huntingfield, Suffolk =

Village in Suffolk, England

Coordinates: 52.317°N 1.427°E

Huntingfield
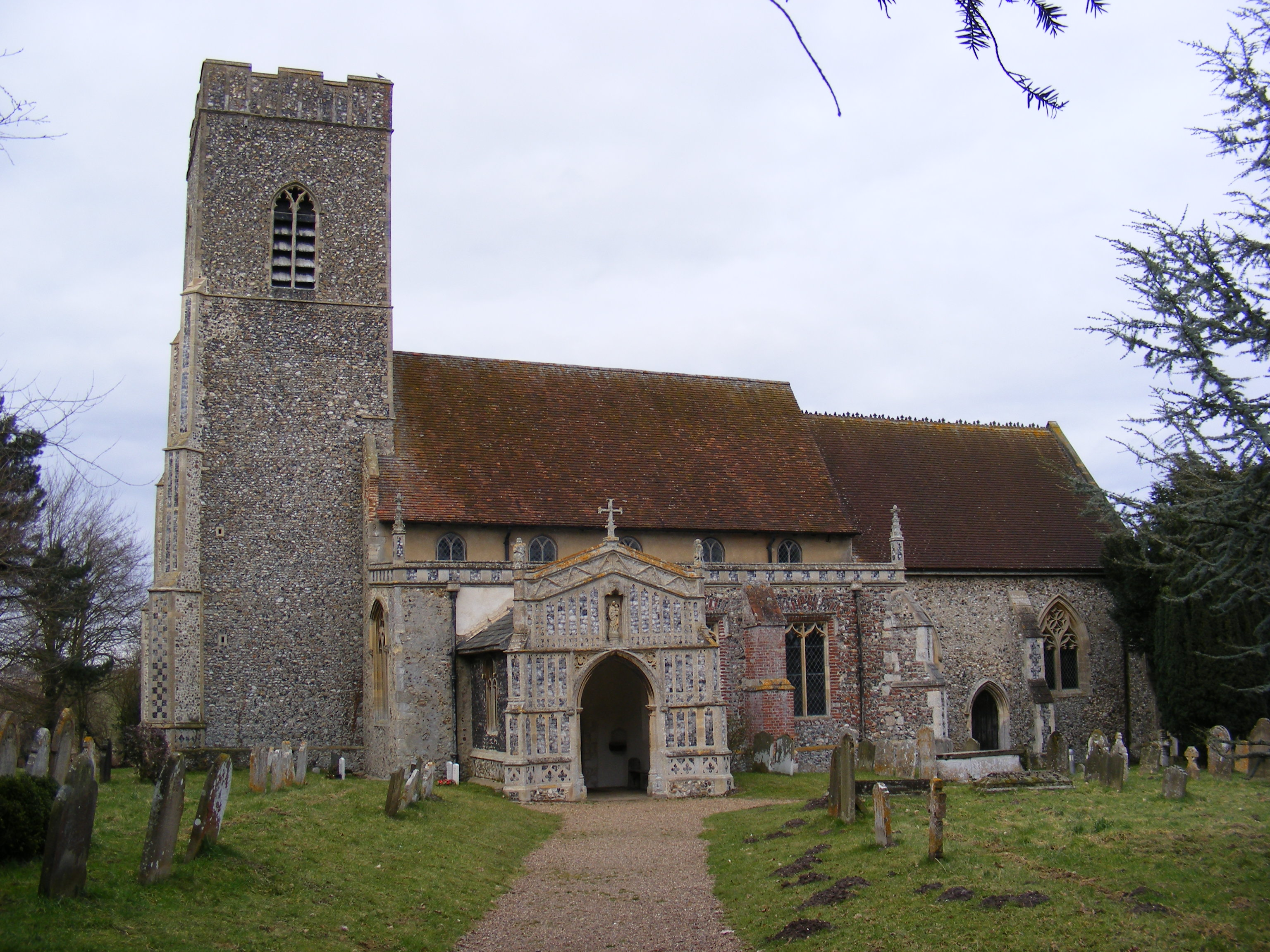
- Church of St Mary, Huntingfield

- Location within Suffolk
- Area: 8.71 km^{2} (3.36 sq mi)
- Population: 188 (2011)
  - Density: 22/km^{2} (57/sq mi)
- Civil parish: Huntingfield
- District: East Suffolk
- Shire county: Suffolk
- Region: East
- Country: England
- Sovereign state: United Kingdom
- Post town: Halesworth
- Postcode district: IP19
- Police: Suffolk
- Fire: Suffolk
- Ambulance: East of England
- UK Parliament: Suffolk Coastal

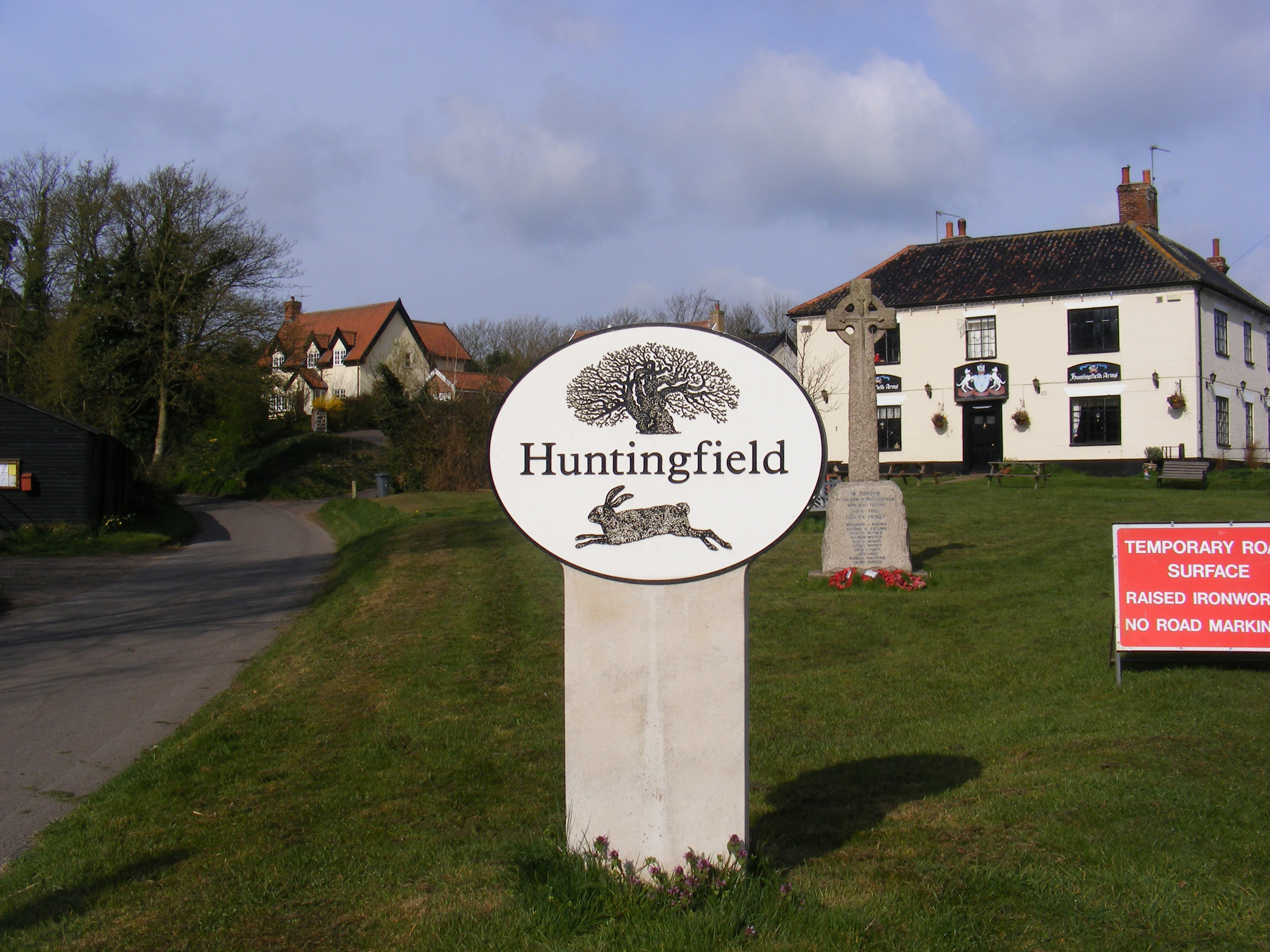
Huntingfield distinctive village sign was designed by a local resident in 2005.

Huntingfield is a village and civil parish near the B1117 road, in the East Suffolk district, in the county of Suffolk, England. The village is close to the source of the River Blyth and the parish is 12 miles from the seaside town of Southwold. Nearby settlements include the town of Halesworth and the villages of Walpole, Heveningham, Cookley and Laxfield.

== History ==
In 1870–72 John Marius Wilson described Huntingfield as,

"a village and a parish in Blything district, Suffolk. The village stands 4½ miles SW of Halesworth r. station. The parish comprises 2,134 acres; and its post town is Halesworth".

Huntingfield was listed in the Domesday Book in the Hundred of Blything. The parish was written in the Domesday Book as Huntingafelda.

Data from the first UK census in 1801 is available for the parish of Huntingfield. In 1801 it was recorded the population of Huntingfield was 373. The highest population was recorded in 1851, with a population of 411. However, since then, the population has slowly declined. The census data showed the population in 2011 in Huntingfield was 188. This data is shown in the graph below and shows the total population of Huntingfield from 1801 to 2011.

Housing records for Huntingfield from 1831 to 1961 show the number of houses vacant and occupied during this time. The number of vacant houses in Huntingfield went from zero to five, with the highest number of houses occupied in 1851.

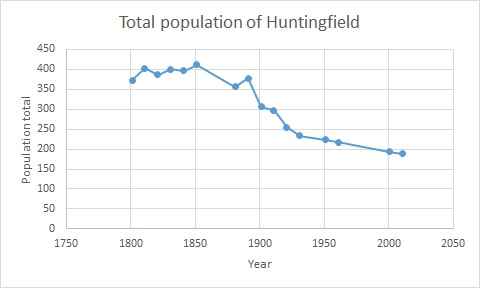
Total population of Huntingfield, as reported by the census of population from 1801 to 2011

In 2005, a sign was designed by a local resident, David Gentleman. The sign stands on the village green and is a distinctive feature of the village.

== Present day ==
Nowadays Huntingfield has remained a rural parish and covers a large area that is sparsely populated. The area is mainly agricultural and is dotted with farmhouses and dwellings.

The 2011 census showed the population of Huntingfield ranged from 0–93 years of age. The most common age within the village in 2011 was 56. Huntingfield is also home to young people and families. In 2011, 39 people under the age of 18 were shown to be living within the parish.

The 2011 census shows Huntingfield doesn't have much cultural diversity as 108 out of its 188 population are of a Christian background. One person is of a Jewish religion while 79 people within the parish have non-or not stated their religion.

The healthcare in the area of Huntingfield appears to be prominently good with 48.4% of the population having very good health compared to 2.2% of the population having bad to very bad health.

== Places of interest ==
=== Church of St Mary ===
The church of St Mary is a fine example of East Anglian late Medieval work. The church is a Grade I listed building and dates from around the 11th century. The church often attracts visitors due to the beautifully painted ceiling. The ceiling was painted by Mildred Holland, the wife of William Holland who was the rector of the parish for 44 years through the years 1848–1892. Holland painted the Chancel roof in the style of the 15th century and during her work, the church was closed for eight months from September 1859 to April 1860. Three years later, Mildred painted the nave and other furnishings of the church. Some of the more recent painted furnishings are as a tribute to her.

=== Huntingfield Arms ===
The Huntingfield arms, previously known as the Arms Inn, is listed as a grade II building. It has been part of the village since the late 18th century.

=== The Hub ===
The Hub, located across the green from the Arms, is a modern example of a village hall, built in 2015/16 to serve the three villages of Huntingfield, Heveningham and Ubbeston.

== Transport ==
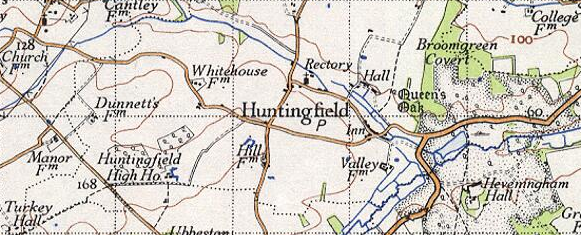
The parish of Huntingfield can be found on Vision of Britain. This extract is from the 1945 Ordnance Survey.

Car ownership within the parish is quite high, as the 2011 census showed there are currently 130 cars registered to households in the area.

Huntingfield has very limited transport facilities. The nearest railway station is in Halesworth, about 4 miles away from the parish. Bus services are also very limited. The nearest bus stop is 4 miles away (6 km). This is evident as the census from 2011 showed the most common mode of transport to work was by car or a van. 53 people were listed as driving a car to work, while 6 were listed as being a passenger in a car or a van. The remaining population travelled to work on a bike/moped or on foot, with only one person using a train. A high proportion, 21 people, are remote workers, while 44 people are not in employment.

== Economy ==
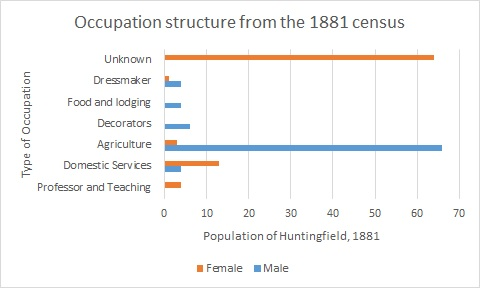
The occupational structure of Huntingfield as shown by the 1881 Census

Historically, employment in Huntingfield appears to have been firmly based within the agricultural sector. The 1881 census also revealed a large majority of women were of unknown occupation. The bar chart shows the types of occupations of the population of Huntingfield and the number of men and women employed in each sector. Despite agriculture being the dominant sector of employment, a large majority, particularly women were employed in Domestic services. This type of occupation included employment as a gardener, indoor servant or washing and bathing services.

According to the 2011 census the agricultural sector still remains popular in the parish. Out of the 88 people of working age in Huntingfield (those aged 16–74 in employment), 12.5% are working in the agricultural area. This is evident, as even today in relation to the map representing the area of Huntingfield the majority of land is agricultural, and of green space. The parish is sited on the eastern edge of the high Suffolk claylands, where the heavy soils make it ideal for farming.

Despite a variety of employment shown in the graph, it appears the majority of the population in Huntingfield relied heavily on agriculture as a source of income during this time.

The current average house price in Huntingfield is £515,750. In the last 12 months house prices have decreased by an average of £8,244. In terms of types of housing within the parish, it is evident from the Office for National Statistics 2011 census report that the most predominant type of housing in Huntingfield is detached houses. The data also shows in 2011 there were 2 temporary structures/ caravans in the parish.
