= Faircloth =

Faircloth is a surname and a given name. A variant form is Fairclough. Notable people with the name include:

== Surname ==
- Art Faircloth (1921–2010), American football player
- Earl Faircloth (1920–1995), American politician and lawyer
- Frank M. Faircloth (1820–1900), Union naval officer
- Frederic Herbert Faircloth (1870–1925), Australian architect
- John Faircloth (born 1939), American politician
- Larry V. Faircloth (born 1948), American politician
- Lauch Faircloth (1928–2023), American politician
- Nancy Bryan Faircloth (1930–2010), American philanthropist
- Rags Faircloth (1892–1953), American baseball player
- Sean Faircloth (born 1960), American writer and politician
- Wayne Faircloth (born 1953), American legislator from Texas
- William T. Faircloth (1829–1900), American jurist

== As a given name ==
- Faircloth Barnes (1929–2011), American pastor and gospel musician
