= Silvanigrellaceae =

Scientific classification
- Domain: Bacteria
- Kingdom: Pseudomonadati
- Phylum: Bdellovibrionota
- Class: Oligoflexia
- Order: Silvanigrellales
- Family: Silvanigrellaceae; Hahn et al. 2017

Genera
- Fluviispira; "Pigmentibacter"; Silvanigrella; "Ca. Spirobacillus"; "Ca. Turbibacter" corrig. Dirren & Posch 2016

Family of bacteria

The Silvanigrellaceae are the only family of the order Silvanigrellales, of the class Oligoflexia.

== Phylogeny ==
The currently accepted taxonomy is based on the List of Prokaryotic names with Standing in Nomenclature (LPSN) and National Center for Biotechnology Information (NCBI).

16S rRNA based LTP_10_2024

- Silvanigrellaceae
  - Fluviispira
  - Silvanigrella [incl. "Pigmentibacter"]

120 marker proteins based GTDB 09-RS220

- Silvanigrellaceae
  Silvanigrella [incl. Fluviispira, "Pigmentibacter", "Ca. Spirobacillus"]

== See also ==
- List of bacterial orders
- List of bacteria genera
