= Peter Fairclough =

Peter Fairclough may refer to:

- Peter Fairclough (cricketer) (1887–1952)
- Peter Fairclough (footballer) (1893–1963)
