= Cotton Hall =

Grade II listed home in Suffolk, England

Coordinates: 52°04′58″N 0°29′27″E

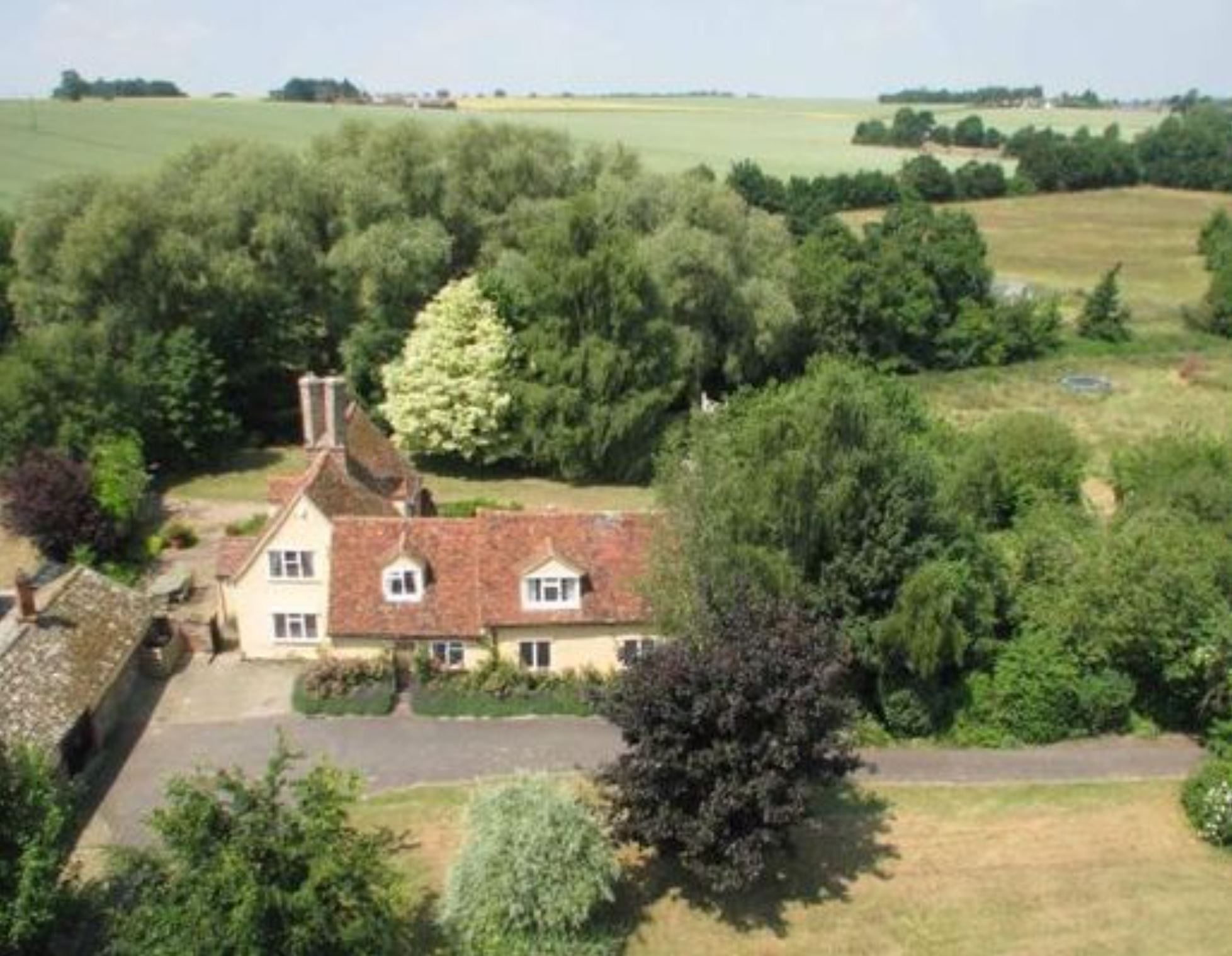
West front of Cotton Hall, Kedington

Cotton Hall is a Grade II listed house and former sub-manor in the village of Kedington, Suffolk, England. It is located on the banks of the River Stour and is one of the ancient notable manor houses in the parish. From 1742 it was the residence of the Bowyer family of Suffolk. The present building is a timber-frame and plaster structure estimated to be built between the 15th and 17th centuries. It was heavily restored in the 20th century.

== History ==
The estate was seized from Sir Hugh de Peche upon his death in 1292. There is mention of the hall in 'The Calendar of Inquisitions Post-Mortem' from the reign of Edward II, indicating the existence of a profitable estate in the 14th century. In 1734, Hitch Wale, the uncle of Sir Charles Wale stayed at the hall. The Suffolk newspaper the Ipswich Journal describes the estate in a publication of July 10, 1742 as "a good dairy farm called Cotton Hall consisting of 270 acres of meadow, pasture and plow with new house upon it, barns, stables, neat houses". The 1742 change of hand, when the estate came into the possession of the Bowyer family, was organised by the local Baron Prettyman. In 1896, the will of William Bowyer states that his estate was valued at £11,637 (equivalent to £1,583,180 in 2020). At some point before 1896 the Bowyer family acquired Church Farm, in nearby Clare. The house was also the residence of the British virologist Peter Wildy up until his death in 1987.

== See also ==
- St Peter and St Paul's Church, Clare
