= Peter Wildy =

British virologist (1920–1987)

Norman Peter Leete Wildy
- Born: 31 March 1920; Tunbridge Wells
- Died: 10 March 1987 (aged 66); Kedington, Suffolk
- Resting place: Hinxton
- Education: University of Cambridge
- Known for: herpes simplex virus
- Spouse: Joan Audrey Kenion
- Children: 3
- Awards: FRSE 1962; President, Society for General Microbiology 1978–1981
- Scientific career
- Fields: Virology
- Workplaces: St Thomas's Hospital, London; MRC Experimental Virology Unit, Glasgow; University of Birmingham; University of Cambridge

Norman Peter Leete Wildy (31 March 1920 – 10 March 1987) was a 20th-century British virologist who was an expert on the herpes simplex virus.

== Education and personal life ==
Wildy was born in Tunbridge Wells in Kent on 31 March 1920, the son of Eric Lawrence Wildy (1890–1973) an electrical engineer, and his wife, Gwendolen Leete (1890–1982). He was educated at Eastbourne College. He studied medicine at the University of Cambridge, graduating MB BChir, and completed his medical training at St Thomas Hospital, London. In 1945, he married Joan Audrey Kenion; they had a son and two daughters.

He was called up and did his National Service as a medical officer with the Kings West African Rifles, serving in Nigeria, India and Egypt.

On his return, Wildy worked as a house officer at Greenbank Hospital, Plymouth. Housing was in short supply, so he bought Happy Medium, a retired RAF air-sea rescue launch, which was moored initially on the Cornish side of the Tamar. When he obtained a fellowship at St Thomas's Hospital in London, he sailed the Happy Medium to the more convenient location of Shoreham-by-Sea, near Brighton.

In the early 1950s, he achieved a two-year Exchange Fellowship to the University of Melbourne, Australia.

Wildy could play the flute and piccolo, kept Black Welsh Mountain Sheep, and was able to spin and dye wool. He was also a competent carpenter – he built his own spinning wheel – and capable of other practical activities such as re-roofing a barn and re-building rooms in his house.

He died of lung cancer on 10 March 1987 at Cotton Hall in Kedington in Suffolk.

== Scientific career ==
Wildy obtained a research post at the Research Laboratory at St Thomas's Hospital in London, working as a bacteriologist. He was appointed to a lectureship in 1952 and senior lectureship in 1957. During this time, he became interested in virology and managed to spend time working with Sir MacFarlane Burnet at the Walter and Eliza Hall Institute in Melbourne, Australia. It was there that he started work on herpes.

He subsequently was at the Department of Pathology at University of Cambridge, where he worked on herpes simplex virus and met Michael Stoker, who would have a significant impact on his career. During his brief time at the University of Cambridge, he worked with Sydney Brenner and Bob Horne, a leading electron microscopist, to use negative staining to see details of viral structure for the first time. This led him into viral classification, an important area of his work for the rest of his life. Proposals for viral classification that he made with collaborators became the basis for an international system. He was subsequently the first chair of the International Committee for the Taxonomy of Viruses.

By 1959, Wildy was brought to the new Medical Research Council (Experimental Virology Unit) in Glasgow by Michael Stoker, its founding director. Wildy was the assistant director. In 1962, he was elected a Fellow of the Royal Society of Edinburgh; his proposers were Guido Pontecorvo, Michael Stoker, Sir William Weipers and Sir Michael Swann.

From 1963 to 1975, he was professor of virology and bacteriology at the University of Birmingham, introducing a specialised MSc degree programme in virology. During this time, he was also involved in the foundation of the Journal of General Virology, which began publication in 1967, and was the journal's first editor. He was also one of the four founders of the International Congress of Virology, first held in Helsinki in 1968.

In 1975, he was appointed to the chair of pathology at the University of Cambridge, remaining there until 1987. During this time, part of his department moved to a site three miles away at Addenbrooke. He also became a Fellow of Gonville and Caius College.

He was president of the Society for General Microbiology from 1978 to 1981, and an honorary member from 1986.

During his career, he was a member of many committees, serving on the board of the Public Health Laboratory Service, and as an adviser to the World Health Organization and the governing bodies of several research council institutes.

== Publications ==
- What's in a Virus Name? (1966)
- Andrewes, C.; Pereira, H. G.; Wildy, P. Viruses of vertebrates (1978, 4th edition), Bailliere Tyndall, London
- Wildy P. Herpes: History and Classification. Kaplan A.S. (Ed.), The Herpesviruses, Academic Press, New York (1973), pp. 1–26.

== Legacy ==
The annual Peter Wildy Prize Lecture in microbiology education or communication is named after him.

Gonville and Caius College, Cambridge, awards an annual Wildy Student scholarship in virology.

== Peter Wildy Prize Lecturers ==
This Prize lecture was introduced in 2001 by the Microbiology Society for communication of microbiology in education and to the public. The following have been guest lecturers:

- Lucy Thorne (2024)
- Iruka N Okeke (2023)
- Elisabeth Bik (2021)
- Laura Bowater (2019)
- Tansy Hammarton (2018)
- Wendy Barclay (2016)
- Simon Park (2015)
- Stephen Curry (2014)
- David Bhella (2013)
- Vincent Racaniello (2012)
- Anthony C. Hilton (2011)
- Sue Assinder (2010)
- Chris Smith (2008)
- R. E. Sockett (2006)
- Joanna Verran (2005)
- Nicholas Thomson (2004)
- R. A. Killington (2003)
- Alan J. Cann (2001)
