= Samuel Fairclough =

English nonconformist divine (1594–1677)

Samuel Fairclough (1594–1677) was an English nonconformist divine.

== Early life ==
Fairclough was born 29 April 1594 at Haverhill, Suffolk, the youngest of the four sons of Lawrence Fairclough, vicar of Haverhill, by his wife Mary, daughter of John Cole of that town. After some preliminary training under a Mr. Robotham, who said of him that he was the best scholar he had ever taught in the course of thirty years, he was sent to Queens' College, Cambridge, at the age of fourteen. Various stories are told of his strict life and steady attachment to moderate puritan principles. He refused on principle to take a woman's part in the comedy of ‘Ignoramus’ when about to be presented before James I.

== Ministry ==
Soon after taking his B.A. degree a Mr. Allington offered him a presentation to a living in Suffolk, but not being of age to receive priest's orders he declined it, and preferred to pursue his theological studies with Richard Blackerby, then resident at Ashen, Essex, whose eldest daughter he afterwards married. In 1619, he accepted an offer from the mayor and nine aldermen of Lynn Regis, Norfolk, of a lectureship,. from the congregation. ‘His popularity,’ relates Edmund Calamy, ‘excited the envy of the other ministers, and he was openly opposed by the publicans, whose business declined from the decrease of drunkenness.’

Samuel Harsnet, bishop of Norwich, cited him into his court for neglecting to use the sign of the cross in baptism, and the result was that Fairclough retired. He then accepted a similar but a less conspicuous position at Clare, Suffolk, where he had often preached while at Ashen. Before long Sir Nathaniel Barnardiston, who was frequently one of his hearers, presented him to the adjoining rectory of Barnardiston, 27 June 1623. He there met with further opposition. One of the clergymen at Sudbury being ill, Fairclough occupied his pulpit for him, and in the evening he repeated the sermon which he had preached to the family in whose house he lodged. For this articles were exhibited against him in the Star Chamber as a factious man; he was convened before the Court of High Commission, and made to attend at different times for more than two years. Matters were only resolved by covert influence.

Barnardiston then presented Fairclough to the rectory of Kedington, near Haverhill, and obtained his institution 10 February 1629, ‘without his personal attendance upon the bishop, taking the oath of canonical obedience, or subscribing the three articles.’ In this living he continued for nearly thirty-five years, preaching four times a week. His Thursday lectures were admired, by the local ministers, and scholars and fellows of colleges from Cambridge.’ When the Book of Sports was republished, Fairclough was often cited to appear before the archdeacon and commissary at Bury St Edmunds, but managed to evade attendance on the plea of a weakness which disabled him from riding. During the First English Civil War he showed little active sympathy with the presbyterians. He was nominated one of the Westminster Assembly of divines in June 1643, but excused himself from attending; and though he signed the petition in 1646 he absolutely refused the engagement. He also declined the mastership of Trinity College, Cambridge.

== Ejection and later life ==
In 1662, he could not take the oath, and so left his living. He resided for four or five years with two of his sons, Richard and Samuel, and his two sons-in-law, George Jones and Richard Shute, who had left their livings, in an old manor house called Sculpins at Finchingfield, Essex, which became ‘a little college.’ Father and sons preached by turns in the family.

When they were dispersed Fairclough went to live with his youngest son, a conforming minister at Kennett, Cambridgeshire, and then with his daughters at Heveningham, Suffolk, and Stowmarket in the same county successively. He died at Stowmarket 14 December 1677, aged 84, and was buried near the vestry door of the church.

== Works ==
He published:

- ‘The Troublers troubled, or Achan condemned and executed. A sermon … Apr. 4, 1641,’ London, 1641.
- ‘The Prisoners Praises for their deliverance from their long imprisonment in Colchester, on a day of publique thanksgiving, set apart for that purpose by the Gentlemen of the Committee of Essex, … surprised by the enemie at Chelmesford. In a sermon … Ps. cxlix. 6–8, preached at Rumford Septemb. 28, 1648,’ London, 1650.
- ‘Ἅγιοι ἄξιοι, or the Saints worthinesse and the worlds worthlessnesse, … declared in a sermon [on Heb. xi. 38] … at the funeral of … Sr Nathaniel Barnardiston,’ London, 1653.
- ‘The Pastor's Legacy,’ London, 1663.

His portrait, a small head by F. H. van Hove, is in Clarke's ‘Lives’ (1683), p. 153 b.

== Family ==
His son Richard Fairclough was a preacher in Frome until he too was ejected in 1622.

His second son, Samuel Fairclough (1625?–1691), was a fellow of Caius College, Cambridge, and afterwards rector of Houghton Conquest, Bedfordshire, but was ejected in 1662. In 1672 he was licensed a congregational teacher at Chippenham, Cambridgeshire. He died 31 December 1691, aged 66, and was buried at Heveningham, Suffolk, his funeral sermon having been preached by a conformist, Nathaniel Parkhurst, vicar of Yoxford. There are memorials to him and his wife, Frances Folkes of Kedington, in Heveningham Church. He published: an ‘offertory’ in verse in ‘Suffolk's Tears; or, Elegies on … Sir Nathaniel Barnardiston,’ London, 1653; a ‘brief account of some remarkable passages of the life and death of Mrs. Anne Barnardiston,’ prefixed to John Shower's funeral sermon for that lady, London, 1682, and an ‘epistle’ before the funeral sermon for his brother-in-law, Richard Shute, in 1689.
