= Liz Sockett =

British microbiologist

Liz Sockett CBE FRS
- Born: Renee Elizabeth Sockett; 1962 (age 63–64); Newcastle upon Tyne
- Education: University of Leeds (BSc); University College London (PhD)
- Awards: Daiwa Adrian Prize (2007)
- Scientific career
- Fields: Microbiology; Bdellovibrio
- Workplaces: University of Oxford; University of Nottingham; University of Illinois at Urbana–Champaign
- Thesis: Biochemistry of motility and taxis in purple photosynthetic bacteria (1986)
- Website: nottingham.ac.uk/life-sciences/people/liz.sockett

Renee Elizabeth Sockett CBE FRS (born 1962) is a professor and microbiologist in the School of Life Sciences at the University of Nottingham. She is a world-leading expert on Bdellovibrio bacteriovorus, a species of predatory bacteria.

== Early life and education ==
Sockett was born in Newcastle upon Tyne in 1962 and completed her Bachelor of Science degree in biochemistry at the University of Leeds in 1983. She moved to University College London (UCL) for her postgraduate study, and was awarded a PhD in 1986 for research on the biochemistry of motility and taxis in purple bacteria.

== Career and research ==
After completing her PhD, Sockett worked as a postdoctoral research associate at the University of Illinois at Urbana–Champaign (1986-1988) and then the University of Oxford (1988-1990). In 1991, she was appointed as a Lecturer at the University of Nottingham and subsequently promoted to senior lecturer in 2001, Reader in 2004 and Professor in 2005.

Her research group started by studying the photosynthetic bacterium Rhodobacter sphaeroides. Her interests in bacterial physiology and mechanisms then turned to understanding the bacterial predator Bdellovibrio bacteriovorus. Bdellovibrio preys upon a wide range of bacteria including antibiotic-resistant pathogens that are harmful to human health. Sockett's lab have studied the genome of Bdellovibrio during the invasion of other bacteria. Her group has identified several Bdellovibrio genes that make enzymes which break down important structural components of bacteria, and also secrete enzymes that break down chromosomes. She is studying the application of predatory bacteria like Bdellovibrio to treat antimicrobial-resistant infections.

Sockett's group worked together with Alexandra Willis and her PhD supervisor Serge Mostowy at Imperial College London to study Bdellovibrio predation in a zebrafish infection model. Zebrafish infected with a lethal dose of the antibiotic-resistant human pathogen Shigella flexneri were given Bdellovibrio as a treatment. Together, the researchers showed that Bdellovibrio could kill the Shigella, working synergistically with the zebrafishs' own immune system to promote zebrafish survival.

Sockett and her group collaborated with Erkin Kuru at Indiana University Bloomington, using fluorescent D-amino acids (FDAAs) to illuminate the mechanisms by which Bdellovibrio invades its prey. They discovered that Bdellovibrio forms a small reinforced 'porthole' in the cell wall of its prey through which it squeezes and then re-seals from the inside.

She also has long-standing collaborations with Andrew Lovering at the University of Birmingham, who studies the structural biology of predatory Bdellovibrio enzymes, and Waldemar Vollmer at the Institute for Molecular Bioscience at University of Queensland, who studies the structure of bacterial cell walls.

As part of a Human Frontier Science Program grant, Sockett collaborated with Shin-Ichi Aizawa to study the Bdellovibrio interaction with Escherichia coli. Her strains appeared in electron microscope images in the 2013 book The Flagellar World.

Her research has been funded by the Biotechnology and Biological Sciences Research Council (BBSRC), Engineering and Physical Sciences Research Council (EPSRC), Medical Research Council (MRC), Leverhulme Trust and the Wellcome Trust.

Sockett is a communicator and role model for careers in microbiology, which was recognised by the award of the Peter Wildy prize of the Society for General Microbiology in 2006, where her prize lecture was entitled Not Just Germs - Bringing Bacteria to Life.

Socket is an advocate for public engagement and science outreach.

== Honours and awards ==
Sockett was appointed Commander of the Order of the British Empire (CBE) in the 2022 Birthday Honours for services to microbiology.

Sockett was interviewed on The Life Scientific by Jim Al-Khalili in 2017. Other awards and honours include:

- 2019 Elected a Fellow of The Royal Society
- 2017 Elected a Fellow of the American Academy of Microbiology
- 2007 Daiwa-Adrian Prize for Anglo-Japanese Science
- 2006 Society for General Microbiology Peter Wildy Prize
- 2000 University of Nottingham Lord Dearing Award
- 2000 Royal Society / BAAS Millennium Award
