= St Michael and All Angels' Church, Cookley =

St Michael and All Angels
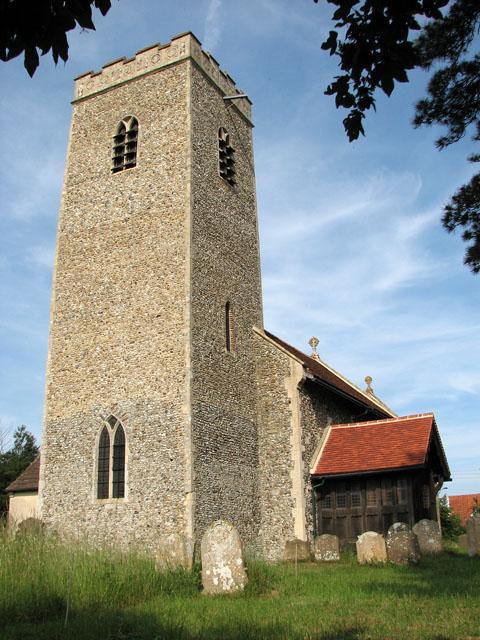
- St Michael and All Angels
- 52.3259°N 1.4465°E
- Location: Cookley, Suffolk, IP19 0LW
- Country: England
- Denomination: Church of England
- Previous denomination: Roman Catholic Church

History
- Status: Active

Architecture
- Functional status: Parish church
- Heritage designation: Grade I listed
- Designated: 7 December 1966

Administration
- Diocese: Diocese of St Edmundsbury and Ipswich
- Archdeaconry: Archdeaconry of Suffolk
- Deanery: Waveney and Blyth
- Parish: Cookley

Clergy
- Bishop: The Rt Revd Norman Banks (AEO)

The Church of St Michael and All Angels is a Church of England parish church in Cookley, Suffolk. The church is a grade I listed building.

== History ==
The church is medieval, with the tower dating to the 12th century. The nave is mainly 12th century with 15th-century windows, while the chancel likely dates to the 14th century. The church was altered in 1894 during the Victorian restoration.

On 7 December 1966, the church was designated a Grade I listed building.

=== Present day ===
St Michael's is part of the Benefice of Heveningham with Ubbeston, Huntingfield and Cookley in the Archdeaconry of Suffolk of the Diocese of St Edmundsbury and Ipswich.

As the parish rejects the ordination of women, it receives alternative episcopal oversight from the Bishop of Richborough (currently Norman Banks).

== Interior ==
The original 15th Century rood screen was discovered in the 1930's by Munro Cautley, later diocesan surveyor for St Edmundsbury and Ipswich, making up part of a chicken shed in Huntingfield he brought it back to the church and it is now bolted to the wall on the south side of the chancel arch. A typical 15th Century East Anglian font with angels holding shields alternating with lions around the bowl stands at the West end of nave.

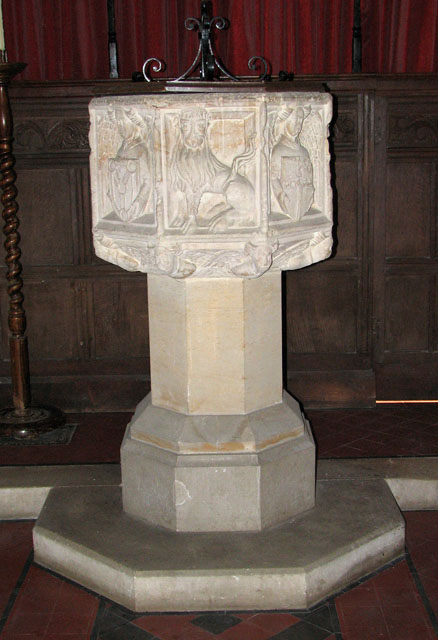
The C15th font

== Bells ==
The church has a ring of 3 bells, two were cast by John Taylor & Co in 1893 the other by Thomas Gardiner of Sudbury in 1720. The tower is affiliated to the Suffolk Guild of Ringers.

Bells of St Michael and All Angels' Church, Cookley
Bell	Date	Note	Diameter	Founder	Weight		
Bell	Date	Note	Diameter	Founder	Hundredweight	lb	kg
Treble	1893	C	30.50 in (77.5 cm)	John Taylor & Co	5 long cwt 1 qr 4 lb	592	269
2nd	1720	Bb	30.75 in (78.1 cm)	Gillett & Johnston	4 long cwt 3 qr 17 lb	549	249
Tenor	1893	Ab	34.00 in (86.4 cm)	John Taylor & Co	7 long cwt 2 qr 15 lb	855	388
