= Church of St Mary, Huntingfield =

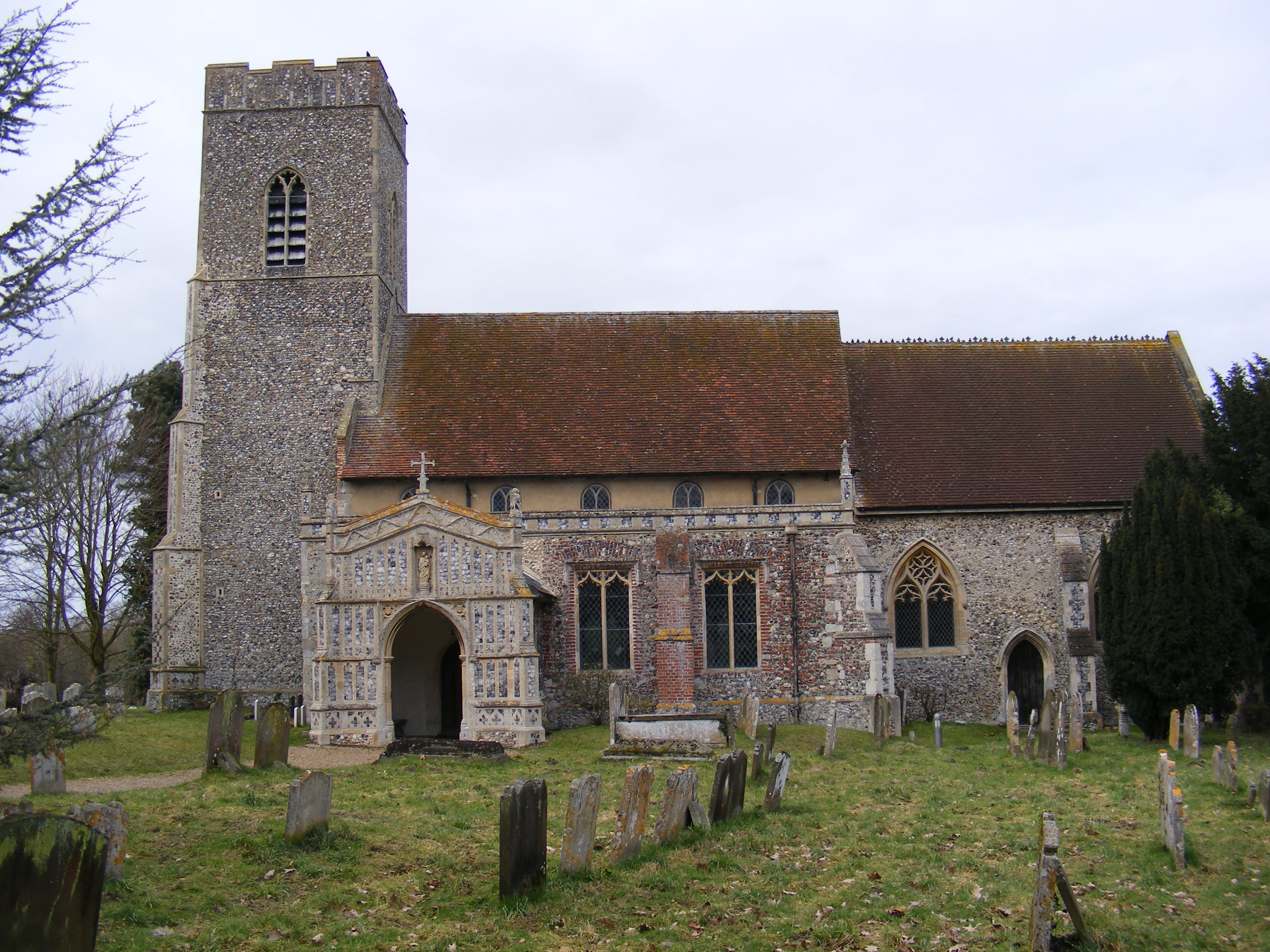
- Church of St Mary, Huntingfield
- 52.3171°N 1.4264°E
- Location: Church Road, Huntingfield, Suffolk, IP19 0PR
- Country: England
- Denomination: Church of England
- Churchmanship: Central

History
- Status: Active
- Dedication: St Mary the Virgin

Architecture
- Functional status: Parish church
- Heritage designation: Grade I listed
- Designated: 7 December 1966

Administration
- Diocese: Diocese of St Edmundsbury and Ipswich
- Archdeaconry: Archdeaconry of Suffolk
- Deanery: Waveney and Blyth
- Parish: Huntingfield

Clergy
- Bishop: The Rt Revd Norman Banks (AEO)

The Church of St Mary the Virgin is a Church of England parish church in Huntingfield, Suffolk. The church is a grade I listed building. It is noted for its highly decorated ceiling.

== History ==
The church dates to the Medieval period. The nave contains a 12th-century window opening. The chancel dates to the 13th or 14th century. The tower dates to the 15th century.

The arched nave ceiling is highly decorated with paintings. It was painted by Mildred Holland during the 19th century when her husband, William Holland, was the church's rector. Norman Scarfe notes that "between 1859 and 1882 that over £2,000 was spent on the church". The church was altered during the Victorian restoration in 1858 to 1859 and in 1896 to 1906.

On 7 December 1966, the church was designated a grade I listed building.

=== Present day ===
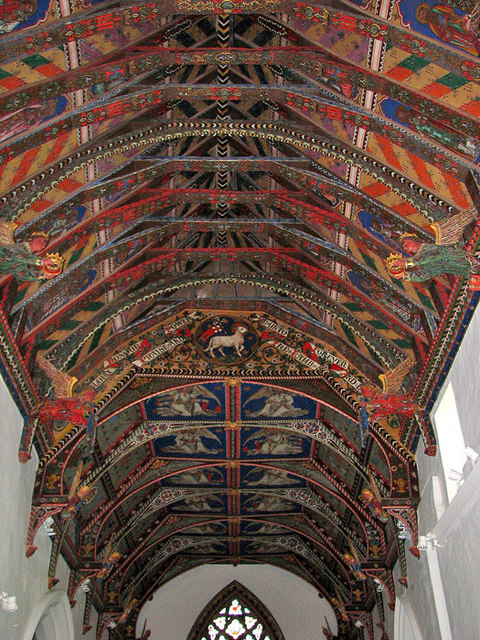
The church's ceiling

St Mary's is part of the Benefice of Heveningham with Ubbeston, Huntingfield and Cookley in the Archdeaconry of Suffolk of the Diocese of St Edmundsbury and Ipswich. The church stands in the Central tradition of the Church of England.

As the parish rejects the ordination of women, it receives alternative episcopal oversight from the Bishop of Richborough (currently Norman Banks).
