= William Benger =

British World War I flying ace

William Joseph Benger
- Born: 21 November 1894; Devizes, Wiltshire, England
- Died: 17 October 1917 (aged 22); Poelcapelle, Belgium
- Burial place: Arras Flying Services Memorial, Pas de Calais, France
- Military career
- Allegiance: United Kingdom
- Branch: British Army
- Rank: Sergeant
- Units: King's Royal Rifle Corps; No. 20 Squadron RFC
- Awards: Military Medal

Sergeant William Joseph Benger MM (21 November 1894 – 17 October 1917) was a British First World War flying ace credited with five aerial victories over German Albatros D.V fighters.

== Biography ==
Benger was born in Devizes, the son of Joseph William and Eleanor Dangerfield Benger. By 1903 the family had moved to Ewell, Surrey, as William and his brother Frank entered the Boys School there, while their father was employed as an attendant at Horton Asylum. William left school in April 1909 to work as an errand boy. By 1911 he was working as a butcher.

Benger initially served in the King's Royal Rifle Corps, and transferred to the Royal Flying Corps in 1917, where he served as an observer/gunner in the Bristol Two-Seater Fighters of 20 Squadron. He was injured in action in a crash landing caused by anti-aircraft fire on 25 June 1917. He scored his first aerial victory on 25 September 1917, in a win shared with Leslie William Burbidge. Two days later, piloted by William Durrand, he set an Albatros D.V aflame over Moorslede. On 3 October, Benger scored an "out of control" victory. Eight days later, he set a D.V on fire and drove another one down out of control. On 17 October 1917 Benger was the observer in Bristol Fighter, No. A7271, piloted by Lieutenant Arthur Gilbert Vivian Taylor, which was shot down over Poelcapelle, Belgium, by Theodor Quandt of Jasta 36. Benger and Taylor were both captured, but died of their injuries shortly afterwards.

Benger's award of the Military Medal was gazetted on 17 December 1917, two months after his death. He has no known grave and is commemorated on the Arras Flying Services Memorial, and on the War Memorial in the churchyard of St Mary's Church, Ewell, alongside his brother Lance Sergeant Frank John Benger, 6th Battalion, Bedfordshire Regiment, KIA 12 April 1917.

== Bibliography ==
- Franks, Norman; Guest, Russell F.; Alegi, Gregory (1997). Above the War Fronts: The British Two-seater Bomber Pilot and Observer Aces, the British Two-seater Fighter Observer Aces, and the Belgian, Italian, Austro-Hungarian and Russian Fighter Aces, 1914-1918. London, UK: Grub Street. ISBN 978-1-898697-56-5.
