= Cookley, Suffolk =

Village in Suffolk, England

Coordinates: 52.325784°N 1.445397°E

Cookley
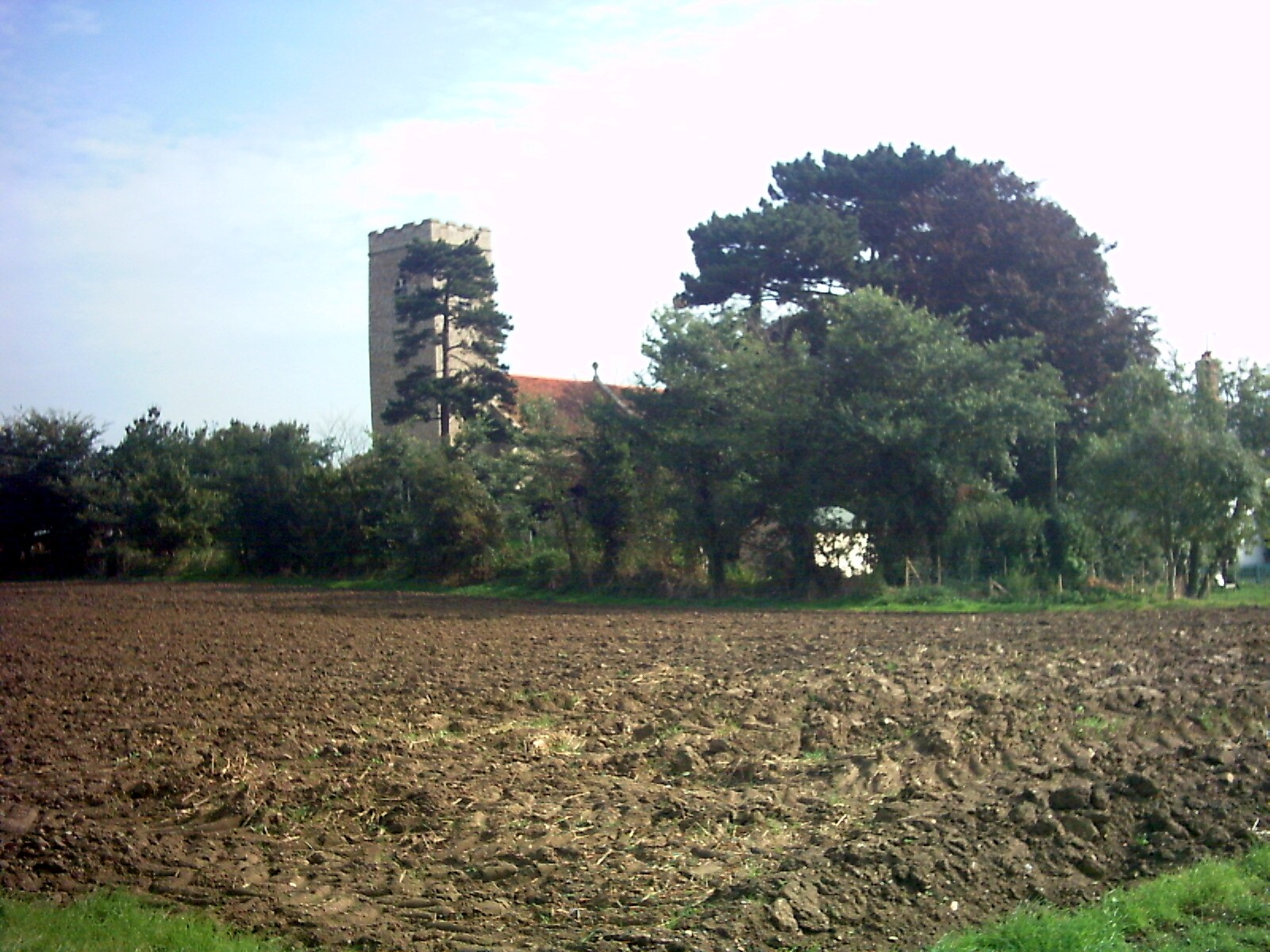
- Church of St Michael

- Location within Suffolk
- Population: 109 (2011 census)
- Civil parish: Cookley
- District: East Suffolk
- Shire county: Suffolk
- Region: East
- Country: England
- Sovereign state: United Kingdom
- Post town: Halesworth
- Postcode district: IP19
- Police: Suffolk
- Fire: Suffolk
- Ambulance: East of England
- UK Parliament: Suffolk Coastal

Cookley is a small village and civil parish in the East Suffolk district, in the east of the county of Suffolk, England. Nearby settlements include the town of Halesworth and the village of Walpole. The village includes the church, cottages and a farm that follows the stream which joins the Blyth River at the town of Halesworth. The church and houses are on the rising ground to the North of the stream. In 2011 the parish had a population of 109.

== Education ==
Overall, in 2011, 27% of people were found to have level 4 qualifications and above whereas 17% had no qualifications. 17% of people also have level 2 and level 3 qualifications however only 14% of people in the Parish of Cookley have level 1 qualifications. Due to the number of students decreasing, The Cookley and Walpole school had to shut down. As Cookley is a rural area, the number of children attending schools may be quite small, due to a lower population implying schools are being forced to close down, and children are forced to move to other schools.

== Population ==
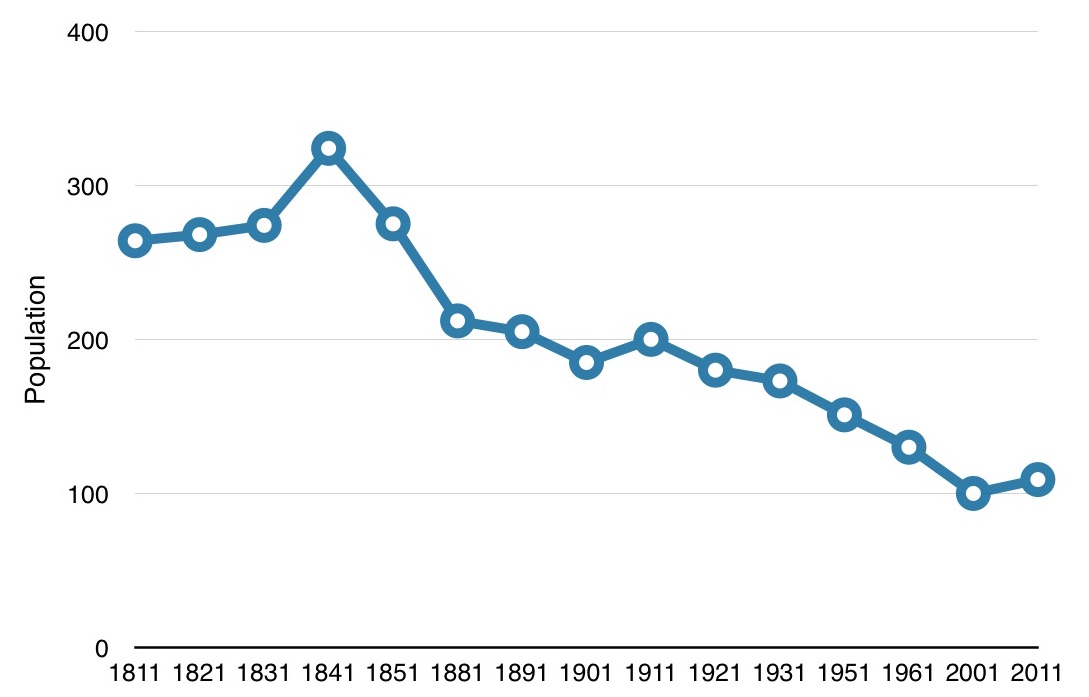
Total population of the parish Cookley

The population has fluctuated over time as the graph shows. From 1811 to 2011 the population has decreased overall. The peak population was in 1840 with 330 people. Before 1901, statistics show that the population of females was overall higher than males but after 1901 this wasn't the case. In 1801 there were 131 males and 133 females whereas in 1901 there were 96 males and 89 females portraying a significant population decrease for both genders. The number of houses also decreased from 1831 to 1961 from 53 houses to 45, supporting the population decrease. The age structure ranged from 0–4 years old to 85–89 years old throughout the population. The age range of 45–49 years old has the highest percentage of people with 35.9% and 2nd highest is 65–74 years old with 14.7% of people in that age range. This implies that Cookley has more pull factors for elderly people and those who that may be retired as it is a rural area compared to those who are young families or economically active individuals therefore Cookley doesn't offer many opportunities to them.

== Occupations ==
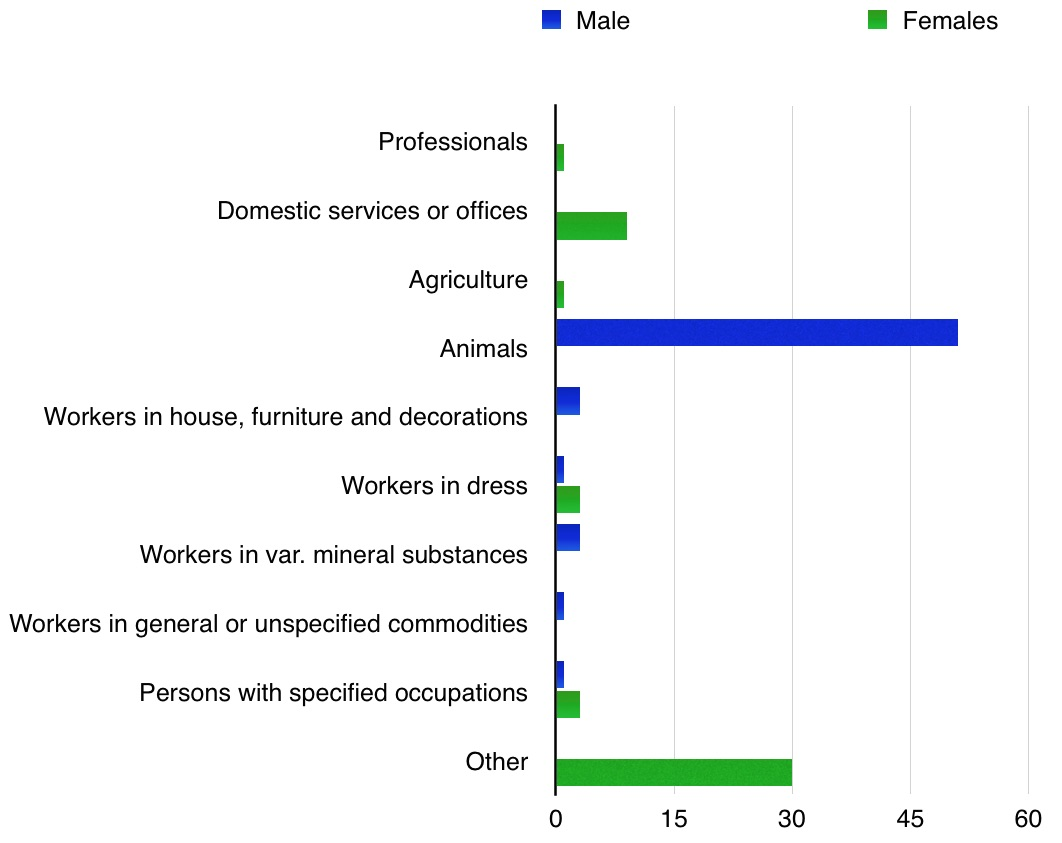
Male and Female Occupations in 1881

The Occupation graph shows the various job sectors males and females were employed in. In 1881 most males (51) worked in the agricultural sector whereas most females (30) worked in the unknown occupation sector. This implies that many jobs were in the primary industry. The number of people employed in other occupations fluctuated for both genders, such as a few number of females being employed as professionals although no males are, and males working in house, furniture and decorations although females aren't and neither gender worked in animal-related jobs. Due to a low population in this area, in 2011 when uncontested parish elections were held, in Cookley there was only one candidate for five seats suggesting that politics aren't strong for employment in the area. The 2011 census portrays that 20.6% are employed as managers, directors or senior officials whereas only 4.8% are employed in the sales and customer service sector. The Process, plant and machine operatives also have only 4.8% of people in that occupation. There are only 11.1% who have jobs in the associate professional and technical sector and 14.3% who have a professional occupation implying that more people are overall employed in the secondary sector rather than the tertiary or quaternary sector.

== Religion and ethnicity ==
The 2011 census shows that 78.9% of people are Christian whereas 9.2% chose not to mention their religion and 11.9% do not have a religion. This suggests that Cookley is not a religiously diverse place suggesting that Cookley isn't a connected location, and remains historically original. The 2011 census shows that 96.3% of people are "White; English/Welsh/Scottish/Northern Irish/British" suggesting the area isn't culturally diverse.

== Tourist sites ==
Many people may travel to Cookley to view the different rural perspectives and to see if it matches their rurality. Due to it being a rural area, transport may be difficult; however, the closest airport to Cookley is the Norwich International Airport, with a distance of 41.5 km North of the village centre of Cookley. Halesworth Railway Station is only 5 km away from Cookley, increasing connections.

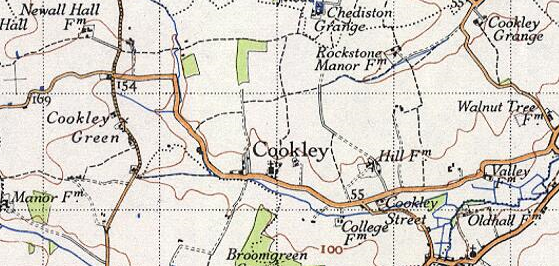
Historical map of Cookley

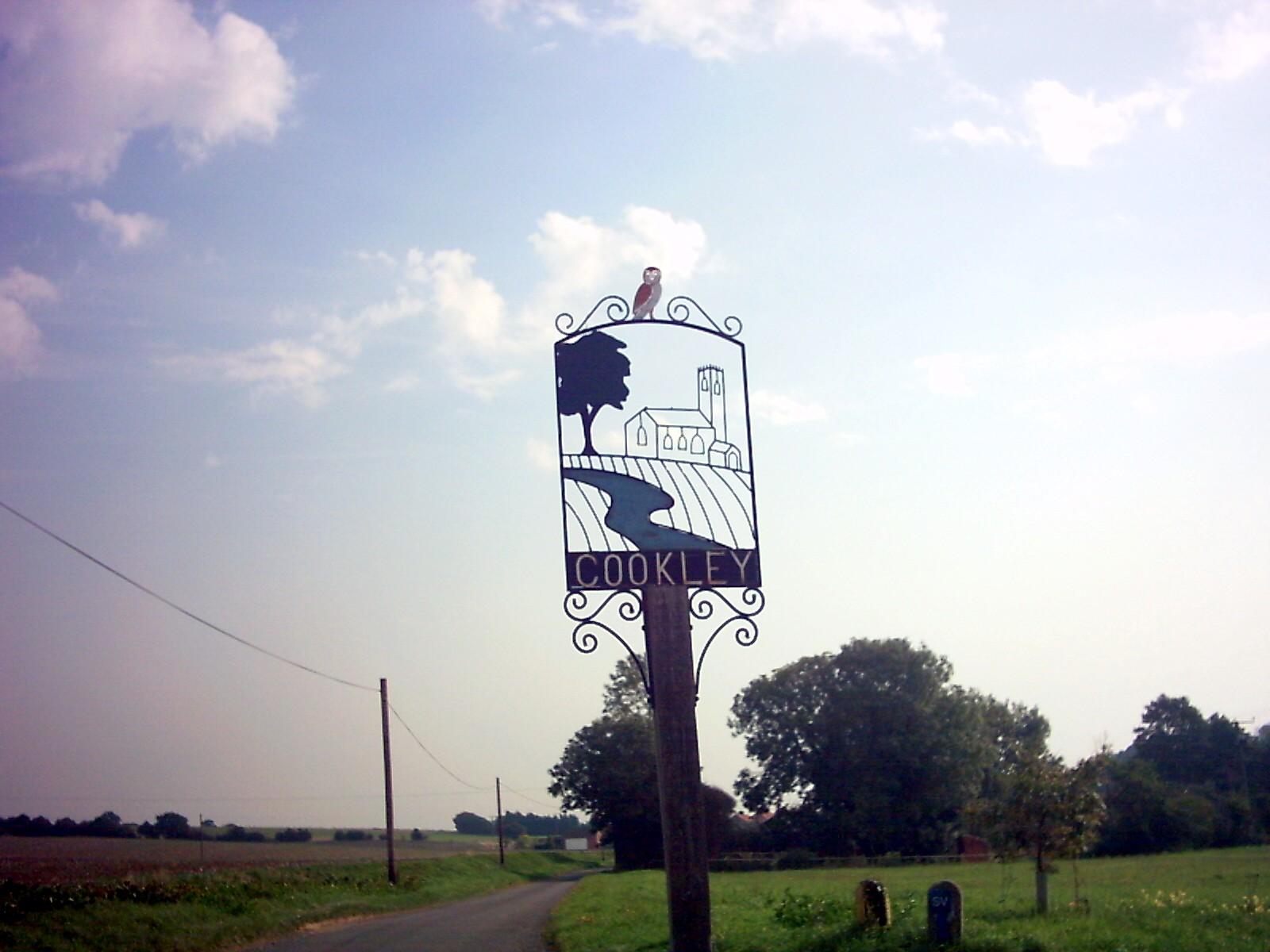
Cookley sign

=== The church ===
The village's church of St Michael was described as follows in the 1870s:

The church consists of nave and chancel, with a tower, and has a Norman door, decorated English windows, an oaken roof, good carved benches, an octagonal font, and a brass of 1587.

The church is described as having "a lack of grandeur that suited a small rural church". "There is a Romanesque sculpture on the N nave doorway." Public transport helped people to travel to the church too, which therefore allows more people to visit.

=== Farms ===
Bucks Farm is a 60-acre farm which overlooks the Blyth Valley. They have four barns which have been modernised for visitors. They also have different facilities such as a fitness room, indoor pool, table tennis and snooker. For families with children, there are toys and books available and a baby sitting service is provided and tourists can visit the animals and feed them if they wish too. The farm is ten miles from the coastline, nearby to Southwold, Walberswick, Dunwich and Aldeburgh and it is only 1.5 miles from Halesworth, where there are various shops, pubs and restaurants.

== Sustainability ==
A plan to install a wind turbine at Rockstone Manor Farm which has been granted permission. The wind turbine is 24.8m tall and will cost£50,000. It is designed to generate 20,000 kW of electricity. They also made sure that rare species will not be threatened before this project goes further. The money generated from the project will help to fund other eco-friendly projects. However, 44 people in Cookley signed a petition in opposition, due to concerns over noise and unaesthetic views.
