= Leslie William Burbidge =

Leslie Williams Burbidge
- Born: 10 March 1891; Bexhill-on-Sea, Sussex, England
- Died: Unknown (post 1919)
- Military career
- Allegiance: United Kingdom
- Branch: British Army; Royal Air Force
- Rank: Captain
- Units: No. 20 Squadron RFC/RAF; No. 12 Squadron RAF
- Awards: Distinguished Flying Cross

Captain Leslie William Burbidge DFC (born 10 March 1891, Bexhill-on-Sea, Sussex, England, date and place of death unknown) was a World War I flying ace credited with six aerial victories. He flew as an observer/gunner in Bristol F.2 Fighters in 20 Squadron.

== Pre-World War I ==
Leslie William Burbidge was the son of Reverend E. O. Burbidge. The younger Burbidge worked for a shipyard in St Helens, Lancashire, from 1910 to 1914. He was fluent in both French and Italian, and gave a home of record in Le Havre when he joined the Royal Flying Corps.

== World War I service ==
=== Military appointments ===
On 1 August 1915 he was promoted from Second Lieutenant to Lieutenant. Temporary Captain Burbidge was appointed an Adjutant in the Army Service Corps on 1 June 1916. He was superseded as Adjutant on 30 July 1917. On 7 October 1917, Burbidge was transferred to the RFC's General List, with seniority backdated to 10 September.

=== Aerial victories ===
On 25 September 1917, Burbidge helped drive down an Albatros D.V out of control for an aerial victory shared with Sgt. William Benger. At mid-day 2 October over Dadizeele, Burbidge drove down two D.Vs five minutes apart for wins two and three. On 13 November, he teamed with pilot ace Lt. Robert Kirby Kirkman to drive down another Albatros D.V out of control; they repeated the feat on 5 December 1917, and Burbidge was an ace.

On 21 February 1918, Burbidge was transferred to Home Establishment. He rejoined 20 Squadron in September. He was flying with Thomas Traill when they destroyed a Fokker D.VII north of Saint Quentin on 29 September 1918. He was also flying with Traill when they collided with another "Brisfit", losing part of a wing; Burbidge climbed out onto the opposite wings, which stabilized their broken plane enough for Traill to be able to crash-land. Burbidge was slightly injured, breaking his nose and biting through his tongue.

== Post World War I ==
Burbidge served in 22 Squadron, then in 12 Squadron in Cologne, Germany. On 23 October 1919, Burbidge transferred to the Royal Air Force's unemployed list.

== Honours and awards ==
Distinguished Flying Cross

Lieut. (Hon. Capt.) Leslie William Burbidge. (FRANCE)

On 23 October this officer displayed marked gallantry and bravery. After destroying a hostile machine his own machine collided, by mischance, with another of his formation on the return journey, and at once began to fall out of control. Capt. Burbidge, with great presence of mind and considerable personal risk, climbed out on to the damaged plane, and so enabled his pilot to regain partial control, maintaining this position till the machine slowly side-slipped on to the ground. By his courageous action this officer undoubtedly saved the life of his pilot at considerable danger to his own, for, on the machine striking the ground, he was thrown from the plane and received serious injuries to his face.

== Bibliography ==
- Franks, Norman; Guest, Russell F. & Alegi, Gregory (1997). Above the War Fronts: The British Two-seater Bomber Pilot and Observer Aces, the British Two-seater Fighter Observer Aces, and the Belgian, Italian, Austro-Hungarian and Russian Fighter Aces, 1914–1918. London, UK: Grub Street. ISBN 978-1-898697-56-5.
