= Thomas Traill =

Argentine-born Royal Air Force Air Vice-Marshal (1899-1973)

Thomas Cathcart Traill
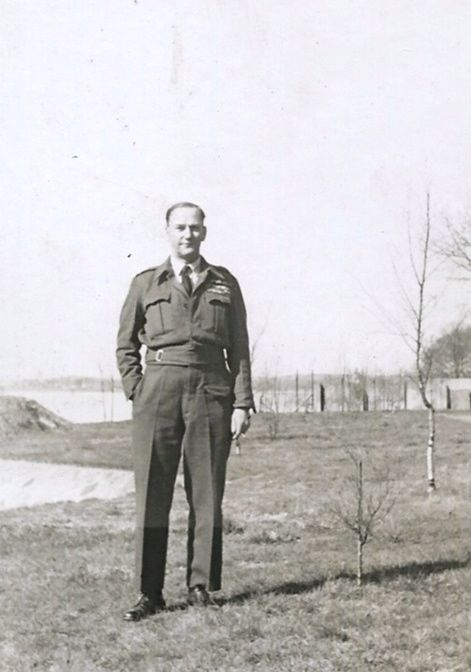
- Born: 6 August 1899; Argentina
- Died: 1 October 1973 (aged 74)
- Burial place: Saint Margaret's Church, Heveningham, Suffolk, England
- Military career
- Allegiance: United Kingdom
- Branch: Royal Navy (1914–17); British Army (1917–18); Royal Air Force (1918–54)
- Service years: 1914–1954
- Rank: Air Vice Marshal
- Commands: No. 19 Group RAF (1952–54); No. 12 Group RAF (1946–49); No. 83 Group RAF (1945–46); RAF Middleton St. George (1941); RAF Helwan (1938); No. 14 Squadron RAF (1935–38)
- Conflicts: First World War; Second World War
- Awards: Companion of the Order of the Bath; Officer of the Order of the British Empire; Distinguished Flying Cross; Mentioned in Despatches (2); Officer of the Legion of Merit (United States)

Air Vice Marshal Thomas Cathcart Traill, CB, OBE, DFC (6 August 1899 – 1 October 1973) was an Argentine-born senior Royal Air Force officer. He began his military career as a midshipman in the Royal Navy, transferred to the Royal Flying Corps in 1917 and rose to the rank of captain during the First World War, becoming a flying ace credited with eight aerial victories. He remained in the newly formed Royal Air Force after the war; by the time he retired in 1954, he had risen to the rank of air vice marshal.

== Early life ==
Thomas Cathcart Traill was born on 6 August 1899 in Argentina. He attended school at the Royal Naval Colleges at Osborne and Dartmouth.

== First World War ==
Traill joined the Royal Navy as a midshipman on 2 August 1914, when he was just four days shy of his 15th birthday. He was assigned to HMS Lord Nelson and served in the Gallipoli campaign.

Traill transferred to the Royal Flying Corps to train as a pilot, and after completion of training was commissioned as a temporary second lieutenant on probation on 11 October 1917. He was assigned to No. 20 Squadron RFC that day as a Bristol F.2 Fighter pilot.

Traill was promoted to lieutenant on 1 April 1918, as the Royal Air Force came into existence. He was promoted to temporary captain when he was appointed as a flight commander on 28 September 1918.

Traill scored eight aerial victories. In the process, he had three other aces serve as his gunner/observer at various times. While in combat on 2 July 1918, Percy Griffith Jones called out a warning from the plane's rear seat and Traill ducked. The German fighter behind them killed Jones and put a bullet through the cockpit and out the windscreen, missing Traill. Traill's next observer took an incendiary bullet in his leg. Leslie William Burbidge then became Traill's observer.

On 23 October, while returning from the mission upon which Traill scored his eighth victory, Traill collided with another plane in his flight while flying at 7,000 feet. The accident knocked away part of the Bristol F.2 Fighter's wing. As the fighter tried to spin out of control, Burbidge leaped out onto the opposite wing at Traill's command, to counterbalance the spin while Traill struggled for control. The resultant crashlanding hurled Burbidge onto his face, but left Traill uninjured and preserved the airplane. Both men were awarded the Distinguished Flying Cross for this incident. Traill's citation read

An officer of marked skill and bravery, who has shot down three enemy machines and seriously damaged a fourth. On 23rd October his machine accidentally collided with one of ours at a height of 7,-000 feet, and a part of the left plane was carried away, the machine being thereby rendered out of control. With great presence of mind Captain Traill ordered his observer to climb out and so directed him to balance the machine which enabled him to obtain partial control. Displaying rare skill and determination, he managed to land his damaged machine safely.

== List of aerial victories ==
Sources
No.	Date/time	Aircraft	Foe	Result	Location	Notes
1	29 May 1918 @ 1840 hours	Bristol F.2 Fighter serial number C856	Fokker Triplane	Driven down out of control	West of Armentières, France	Observer: Percy Griffith Jones
2	30 June 1918 @ 0730 hours	Bristol F.2 Fighter s/n C938	Albatros D.V	Driven down out of control	North of Comines (in Belgium)	Observer: Percy Griffith Jones
3	2 July 1918 @ 0840 hours	Bristol F.2 Fighter s/n B1344	Fokker D.VII	Destroyed	Southeast of Gheluvelt	Observer: Percy Griffith Jones (KIA)
4	29 July 1918 @ 1955 hours	Bristol F.2 Fighter s/n E2452	Fokker D.VII	Driven down out of control	Gheluwe	Observer: Richard Gordon-Bennett
5	24 September 1918 @ 1600 hours	Bristol F.2 Fighter s/n E2252	Fokker D.VII	Driven down out of control	West of Busigny, France	Observer: Richard Gordon-Bennett
6	25 September 1918 @ 1820 hours	Bristol F.2 Fighter s/n E2252	Fokker D.VII	Destroyed	Northeast of Saint-Quentin, France	Observer: Richard Gordon-Bennett
7	29 September 1918 @ 1025 hours	Bristol F.2 Fighter s/n E2370	Fokker D.VII	Destroyed	North of Saint-Quentin, France	Observer: Leslie William Burbidge
8	23 October 1918 @ 1520 hours	Bristol F.2 Fighter s/n E2403	Fokker D.VII	Destroyed	West of Aulnoye-Aymeries, France	Observer: Leslie William Burbidge

== Interwar period ==
Traill remained in military service, becoming the assistant air attaché in Washington D. C. in 1919. During this period he was sent off to join a barn-storming flying circus in the Mid West to raise funds for the Victory Liberty Loan. This was run by the United States Army Air Service under the command of Major George Stratemeyer. They travelled by train from Texas to the Canada–US border, putting on twenty-eight flying displays. These displays took place at race courses, sports grounds or fields. Large crowds attended as the local city authorities frequently closed all schools and colleges, and encouraged businesses to close in order to raise the maximum amount for the war loan. He returned home to Britain the following year, being assigned to experimental work beginning 18 May 1920. He entered the University of Cambridge on 1 October 1922, receiving a Master of Arts in 1924. After that, he had various further domestic military assignments, as well as foreign service in Iraq, before he began attendance at the RAF Staff College on 23 January 1933.

Traill was promoted to squadron leader on 1 December 1934. He was appointed to the command of No. 14 Squadron RAF on 16 August 1935, moving on to command RAF Helwan, Egypt on 10 May 1938. He was subsequently promoted to wing commander on 1 July 1938. On 26 September 1938, he was assigned to staff duty with the headquarters of No. 2 (Bomber) Group.

== Second World War ==
On 14 May 1940, Traill was appointed assistant senior air staff officer at Headquarters Bomber Command. On 11 July 1940, he was made an Officer of the Order of the British Empire. A promotion to Group Captain followed on 1 December 1940. The following year would see him command RAF Middleton St. George before moving on to the post of senior air staff officer (SASO) at Headquarters, No. 242 Group. As part of 242 Group's deployment into Northwest African Air Forces, Traill was promoted to acting air commodore on 21 February 1943 and appointed SASO at the latter organization's headquarters on 8 March 1943. For his services there, he would be Mentioned in Despatches on 2 June 1943.

Traill was appointed director of air tactics on 28 February 1944, and selected as the RAF's liaison officer to the United States Army Air Forces' Eighth Air Force that same year. He was made of Officer of the American Legion of Merit on 11 April 1944, and was again Mentioned in Despatches on 8 June 1944.

== Post-war career ==
On 1 September 1945, Traill became an acting air vice-marshal and was granted command of No. 83 Group RAF. He moved to command of No. 12 Group RAF on 5 May 1946. He was appointed an Officer of the Most Honourable Order of the Bath on 1 January 1948. One year later, he was confirmed as an air vice-marshal.

After a period as director-general of personnel that began on 25 April 1949, he was again appointed to command on 18 February 1952, this time as air officer commanding No. 19 (Reconnaissance) Group. By virtue of this appointment he also became air commander, North-East Atlantic Sub-Area, Allied Command Atlantic, NATO, in 1953.

== Later life ==
Traill retired on 21 September 1954, having served for 40 years. He died on 1 October 1973, and was buried in Saint Margaret Churchyard, Heveningham, Suffolk, England.

== Sources ==
- Shores, Christopher F.; Franks, Norman & Guest, Russell (1990). Above the Trenches: A Complete Record of the Fighter Aces and Units of the British Empire Air Forces 1915–1920. Grub Street. ISBN 978-0-948817-19-9.
- Franks, Norman; Guest, Russell & Alegi, Gregory (1997). Above the War Fronts: the British Two-seater Bomber Pilot and Observer Aces, the British Two-seater Fighter Observer Aces, and the Belgian, Italian, Austro-Hungarian and Russian Fighter Aces, 1914–1918. Fighting Airmen of WWI. Vol. 4. Grub Street. ISBN 978-1898697-56-5.
