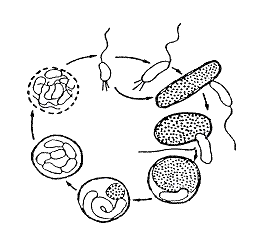
- Bdellovibrionaceae cycle

Scientific classification
- Domain: Bacteria
- Kingdom: Pseudomonadati
- Phylum: Bdellovibrionota
- Class: Bdellovibrionia
- Order: Bdellovibrionales
- Family: Bdellovibrionaceae; Garrity et al. 2006

Genera
- Bdellovibrio; Pseudobdellovibrio

Synonyms
- Pseudobdellovibrionaceae Waite et al. 2022

= Bdellovibrionaceae =

Family of bacteria

The Bdellovibrionaceae are a family of Pseudomonadota. They include genera, such as Bdellovibrio and Vampirovibrio, which are unusual parasites that enter other bacteria.

== Phylogeny ==
The currently accepted taxonomy is based on the List of Prokaryotic names with Standing in Nomenclature (LPSN) and National Center for Biotechnology Information (NCBI).

16S rRNA based LTP_10_2024

- Pseudobdellovibrionaceae
  - Bdellovibrio Stolp & Starr 1963
  - Pseudobdellovibrio Waite et al. 2020

120 marker proteins based GTDB 10-RS226

- Bdellovibrionaceae
  - Bdellovibrio
  - Pseudobdellovibrio

== See also ==
- List of bacterial orders
- List of bacteria genera
