= Bacteriovoracales =

Scientific classification
- Domain: Bacteria
- Kingdom: Pseudomonadati
- Phylum: Bdellovibrionota
- Class: Bacteriovoracia; Waite et al. 2020
- Order: Bacteriovoracales; Hahn et al. 2017

Families
- Bacteriovoracaceae; Halobacteriovoracaceae; Peredibacteraceae

Order of bacteria

Bacteriovoracales is an order of bacteria.

== Phylogeny ==
The currently accepted taxonomy is based on the List of Prokaryotic names with Standing in Nomenclature (LPSN) and National Center for Biotechnology Information (NCBI).

16S rRNA based LTP_10_2024

- - - Peredibacteraceae
      Peredibacter Davidov & Jurkevitch 2004
  - - Bacteriovoracaceae
      Bacteriovorax Baer et al. 2000
    - Halobacteriovoracaceae
      Halobacteriovorax Koval, Williams & Stine 2015

120 marker proteins based GTDB 10-RS226

- Bacteriovoracaceae
  - Peredibacter
  - - Bacteriovorax
    - Halobacteriovorax
