= Frank M. Faircloth =

Union Navy officer

Frank Carney
- Born: c. 1820; Newark, New Jersey, U.S.
- Died: January 6, 1900 (aged 79–80); Jersey City, New Jersey, U.S.
- Burial place: Green Wood Cemetery
- Military career
- Conflicts: Mexican–American War; American Civil War

Frank M. Faircloth aka Francis Marion Faircloth (c. 1820 – January 6, 1900) was an American naval officer who served in the Union Navy during the Civil War.

Born near Newark, New Jersey, Frank Faircloth became a sailor at an early age. He participated in the Mexican–American War and the Civil War. In the latter conflict, as the captain of the Boston, he ordered the ship burned to prevent its capture by the Confederate Navy.

During the Spanish–American War, Faircloth, at the age of 78, commanded the transport Seguranca. He also served as the captain of a Ward Line steamer. At the time of his death he had the title of Port Captain of the recently captured Cuban city of Santiago.

On Tuesday, January 2, 1900, suffering from a fever, Frank Faircloth returned to his home at 110 Clinton Avenue in Jersey City, New Jersey, where he died the following Saturday night at the age of 79.

He was laid to rest at Green Wood Cemetery in Brooklyn NY Section 162, lot 15491, grave 2
