= Joanna Verran =

British microbiologist

Joanna Verran FRSB
- Education: University of Manchester (BSc, MSc, PhD)
- Awards: AAAS Award for Public Engagement with Science (2019); National Teaching Fellowship (2011)
- Scientific career
- Workplaces: Manchester Metropolitan University
- Thesis: Effect of two potential sucrose-substitutes upon adherence and sucrose metabolism of Streptoccus mutans (1981)
- Website: www2.mmu.ac.uk/athena-swan/women-in-science-at-mmu/joanna-verran/

Joanna Verran FRSB is an Emeritus Professor of Microbiology and Head of Science Communication at Manchester Metropolitan University (MMU). She studies the interaction of microorganisms with inert surfaces. She was awarded the 2019 AAAS Award for Public Engagement with Science.

== Early life and education ==
Verran studied maths, biology and chemistry at A-level. She studied bacteriology and virology and the University of Manchester and graduated with a bachelor's degree in 1977. She went on to earn a Master of Science (MSc) degree in 1978 followed by a PhD in 1981. Her postgraduate research was based on Streptococcus mutans.

== Career and research ==
Verran works on the interactions of microorganisms with surfaces including food preparation surfaces, water pipes and dentures at Manchester Metropolitan University. She has looked at the pathogenicity of Candida albicans and how it relates to stomatitis. She recognised that the properties of surfaces affected the retention of cells, and began to investigated the topography and chemistry of surfaces. She was the academic lead for a Ministry of Agriculture, Fisheries and Food (MAFF) LINK project that worked with Unilever, AstraZeneca, studying the impact of wear on the ability to clean food surfaces. She developed atomic force microscopy to evaluate the attachment of microorganisms to work surfaces. The project informed European Commission funded PathogenCombat, which informed small and medium-sized enterprises about food hygienic preparation. She served as President of the International Biodeterioration Biodegradation Society between 2006 and 2009.

Verran was awarded a National Teaching Fellowship in 2011 and is a Principal Fellow of the Higher Education Academy (HEA). She was involved in the creation of the National Subject Profile in Microbiology. She published An Atlas of Biodeterioration in 2013. She contributed to Effective Learning in the Life Sciences: How Students Can Achieve Their Full Potential.

Verran became interested in the intersection of science and the arts; supporting students to engage with different disciplines. In 2009 Verran launched the Bad Bugs Book Club which looks to engage people with microbiology and infectious diseases. The book club is open to the scientists and non-scientists. She held a Bad Bugs Book Club at the British Science Association Science Communication Conference in 2015. The book club was a case study in Science Communication: A Practical Guide for Scientists. Verran has used zombies and vampires that can act as models of infectious diseases, and demonstrated the exhibit at Cheltenham Science Festival. She has researched effective means of evaluating science communication. She launched the Manchester Metropolitan University (MMU) science communication Master's program in 2016. Verran has been involved with the Bradford Literature Festival and Manchester Children's Book Festival. She has written for The Conversation. She has explored how educational interventions can impact adolescent opinions of vaccinations.

=== Awards and honours ===
Her awards and honours include:

- 2019 AAAS Award for Public Engagement with Science
- 2011 National Teaching Fellowship from the HEA
- 2011 Society for Applied Microbiology Communications Award
- 2006 Society for General Microbiology Award for Innovation in Microbiology Education
- 2023 FEMS Science Communication Award

== Personal life ==
Verran is married with two children.
