= Dennis Fairclough =

Dennis Fairclough is Deputy Chair/Professor at the Computing & Networking Sciences Department at Utah Valley University. He specializes in teaching Borland C++ Builder and Java.

Raised in Northern California, Fairclough earned a Ph.D. at Brigham Young University. He taught at BYU's department of electric engineering from 1976 to 1984. He was an architect of Wicat Systems and began the computer-related section at Eyring Research Institute. He subsequently founded Praxis Computer Systems and Icon Systems.
