= Ubbeston =

Village in Suffolk, England

Coordinates: 52.302017°N 1.406973°E

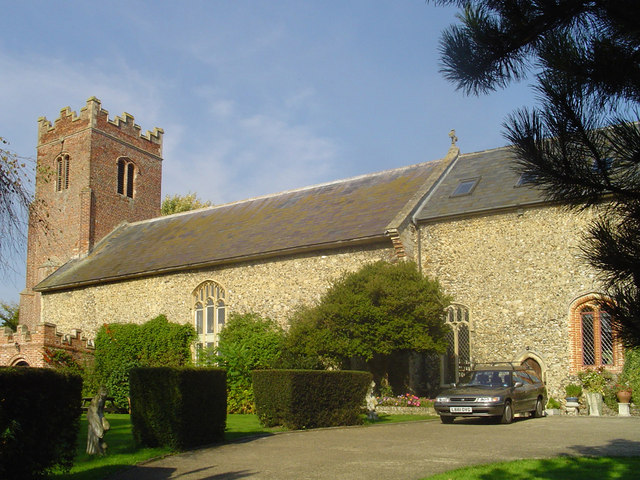

- Location within Suffolk
- Population: 86 (2021 census)
- Civil parish: Ubbeston
- District: East Suffolk
- Shire county: Suffolk
- Region: East
- Country: England
- Sovereign state: United Kingdom
- Post town: Halesworth
- Postcode district: IP19
- Dialling code: 01986
- Police: Suffolk
- Fire: Suffolk
- Ambulance: East of England
- UK Parliament: Suffolk Coastal

Ubbeston is a village and civil parish in the East Suffolk district, in the county of Suffolk, England. It is located at an average elevation of 47 metres above the sea level. Nearby settlements include the town of Halesworth, the village of Heveningham and the hamlet of Ubbeston Green. In 2021 the parish had a population of 86. The church called St Peter is now a house. From 1974 to 2019 it was in Suffolk Coastal district.
