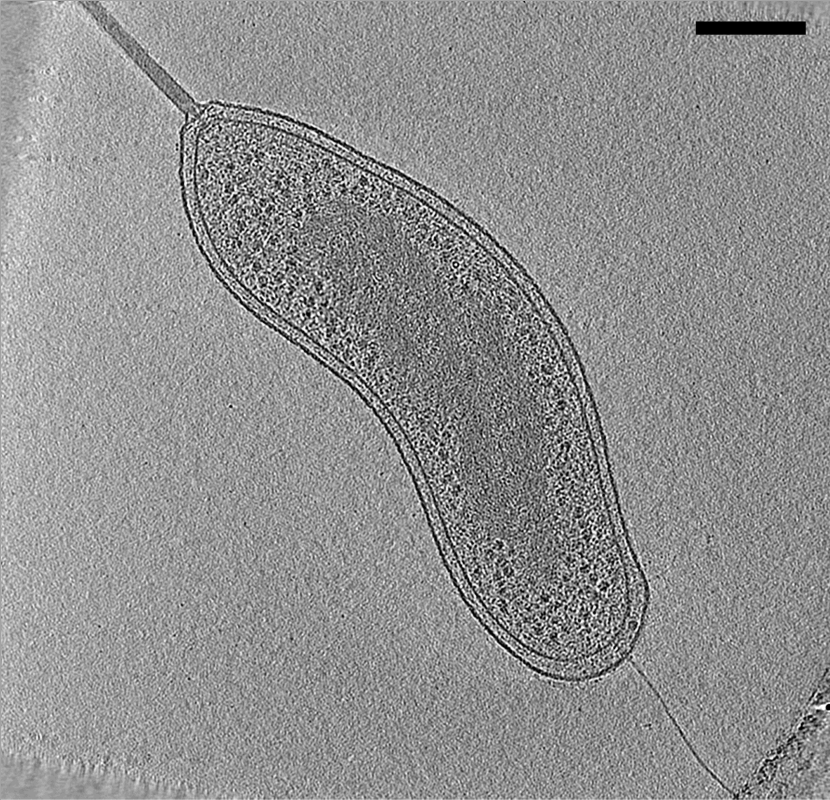
- Central slice through a cryotomogram of an intact Bdellovibrio bacteriovorus cell. Scale bar 200 nm

Scientific classification
- Domain: Bacteria
- Kingdom: Pseudomonadati
- Phylum: Bdellovibrionota
- Class: Bdellovibrionia
- Order: Bdellovibrionales
- Family: Bdellovibrionaceae
- Genus: Bdellovibrio; Stolp & Starr 1963

Type species
- Bdellovibrio bacteriovorus Stolp & Starr 1963

Species
- B. bacteriovorus; B. reynosensis; B. svalbardensis

= Bdellovibrio =

Genus of bacteria

Bdellovibrio is a genus of gram-negative, obligate aerobic bacteria. One of the most notable characteristics of this genus is that members can prey upon other gram-negative bacteria and feed on the biopolymers, e.g. proteins and nucleic acids, of their hosts. They have two lifestyles: a host-dependent, highly mobile phase, the "attack phase", in which they form "bdelloplasts" in their host bacteria; and a slow-growing, irregularly shaped, host-independent form.

== Bdellovibrio bacteriovorus ==
The best studied of these is Bdellovibrio bacteriovorus, which is found almost exclusively in host dependent growth in nature. In this free swimming attack form after searching for prey using its pili, it burrows through the host outer membrane/ peptidoglycan cell wall and enters the periplasmic space. The Bdellovibrio bacterium then forms a structure called a bdelloplast. This bdelloplast is created as the host cell is modified to become spherical in shape. Inside the bdelloplast, the singular large flagellum of the predatory Bdellovibrio is lost. The host cell is then rapidly killed allowing the passage of molecules from the interior of the host cytoplasm through to the periplasm freely, and the periplasm dwelling Bdellovibrio to feed. Using some of these molecules the Bdellovibrio creates a protective environment by reinforcing the peptidoglycan cell wall of the host in which it now dwells using amidases and transpeptidases. After around 4hrs, depending on ambient temperature, the Bdellovibrio has increased in size dramatically through this nourishment. It divides to replicate and then leaves via final lysis of the host's cell wall and membranes. The newly emerging Bdellovibrio uses their newly grown powerful flagella to swim away and find the next suitable host. Because of this intermittent bdelloplast stage, and momentary parasitic phase (15-20 mins), Bdellovibrio could be considered bacterial predators or parasites.

Bdellovibrio bacteriovorus was first described by Stolp and Petzold in 1962. In 2012 another member of the Bdellovibrio species was identified "Bdellovibrio tiberius" of the River tiber. This species is more capable of host-independent growth.

Not much of Bdellovibrio exovorus, an extra-parasitic bdellovibrio, which cannot enter its prey, and does not form Bdelloplasts.

== Appearance ==
Under a light microscope, host-dependent Bdellovibrio appears to be a comma-shaped motile rod that is about 0.3–0.5 by 0.5–1.4 μm in size with a barely discernible flagellum. Bdellovibrio show up as a growing clear plaque in an E. coli "lawn". Notably, Bdellovibrio has a sheath that covers its flagellum – a rare feature for bacteria. Flagellar motion stops once Bdellovibrio has penetrated its prey, and the flagella is then shed.

Host-independent Bdellovibrio appear amorphous, and larger than the predatory phase.

== Culture conditions ==
B. bacteriovorus appears to be ubiquitous in nature and manmade habitats. They have been found in soil samples, rhizosphere of plant roots, rivers, oceans, sewage, intestines and feces of birds and mammals, and even in oyster shells and the gills of crabs. B. bacteriovorus are able to thrive in almost any habitat, the general requirements are that there needs to be oxygen and some other gram-negative bacteria present in its environment. Its optimal temperature is between 28-30 °C, making B. bacteriovorus a mesophile. Bdellovibrio is grown in the laboratory in its stationary HI (host-independent) phase at 29 °C on yeast peptone broth agar. Host-dependent (predatory) cultures are grown with a population of E. coli S-17 at 29 °C for 16 hrs. They may also be cultured using YPSC (yeast extract, peptone, sodium acetate, calcium chloride) overlays or prey lysates.

== Life cycle and parasitism ==
Bdellovibrio life cycle. The Bdellovibrio attaches to a gram-negative bacterium after contact, and penetrates into the prey's periplasmic space. Once inside, elongation occurs and progeny cells are released within 4 hours.

Bdellovibrio cells can swim as fast as 160 μm/s, or over 100 times their body-length per second. It swims using a single sheathed polar flagellum with a characteristic dampened filament waveform. Bdellovibrio attacks other gram-negative bacteria by attaching itself to the prey cell's outer membrane and peptidoglycan layer, after which it creates a small hole in the outer membrane. The Bdellovibrio cell then enters the host periplasmic space. It remains reversibly attached to it for a short "recognition" period.

After the recognition period, it becomes irreversibly attached via the pole opposite the flagellum. Once inside the periplasm, the Bdellovibrio cell seals the membrane hole and converts the host cell to a spherical morphology, this is due to secretion of L,D transpeptidases which breaks the peptidoglycan apart, and therefore causes the cell to become amorphous. The two-cell complex formed is called a bdelloplast. The Bdellovibrio cell uses hydrolytic enzymes to break down the host cell molecules, which it uses to grow filamentously. When the host cell nutrients are exhausted, the filament septates to form progeny Bdellovibrios. The progeny become motile before they lyse the host cell and are released into the environment. The entire life cycle takes three to four hours, and produces an average of 3–6 progeny cells from a single E. coli, or up to 90 from larger prey such as filamentous E. coli.

Targets of Bdellovibrio species, including Vibrio vulnificus, may undergo co-infection by Bdellovibrio and bacteriophage. Although the Bdellovibrio rounding of prey is thought to be evolved to reduce co-infection of multiple Bdellovibrio, larger prey that do not round may be infected by multiple Bdello's.

== Genomics ==
The genome of Bdellovibrio bacteriovorus HD100 was sequenced in 2004. The HD100 genome is 3782950 nucleotides long, larger than expected given its small size.

== Research and implications ==
Bdellovibrio may be used to help control harmful populations of bacteria due to their predatory nature. In an experiment where Bdellovibrio were added to a shrimp tank to consume populations of bacteria, the target bacterial populations declined by up to 44%. The Bdellovibrio population declined as well after consuming most of the available bacteria. Therefore, use of Bdellovibrio as an inhibitor of other bacteria shows potential, but may be limited to certain cases as Bdellovibrio prefers certain strains, such as gram-negative bacteria. In a subsequent experiment, chickens, highly susceptible to cecal or gut infections, were used in an experiment in which scientists purposely infected chickens with a pathogenic form of Salmonella enterica. The chicken were then exposed to Bdellovibrio bacteriovorus, after which a reduction in inflammation and other harmful changes in the chickens' ceca were observed as a result of decreased Salmonella populations. The success of this experiment suggest there is significant potential for Bdellovibrio in bioremediation. In another study from 2016, scientists discovered that Bdellovibrio bacteriovorus can attack and reduce populations of antibiotic-resistant bacteria, such as Klebsiella pneumoniae, even inside mammalian cell cultures. This finding suggests that Bdellovibrio could one day be used as a living antibiotic to help treat infections caused by drug-resistant Gram-negative bacteria. Experimental infections in mice have shown that Bdellovibrio bacteriovorus can significantly reduce populations of multidrug-resistant bacteria such as Acinetobacter baumannii and Klebsiella pneumoniae without harming the host, suggesting its potential as a therapeutic or ‘living antibiotic’ agent. Bdellovibrio bacteriovorus has had mixed outcomes as an experimental antimicrobial in animal models of eye infections.

== Phylogeny ==
The currently accepted taxonomy is based on the List of Prokaryotic names with Standing in Nomenclature (LPSN) and National Center for Biotechnology Information (NCBI).

16S rRNA based LTP_10_2024

- Bdellovibrio
  - B. bacteriovorus
  - B. reynosensis

120 marker proteins based GTDB 10-RS226

- Bdellovibrio
  - B. svalbardensis Choi et al. 2024
  - - B. bacteriovorus Stolp & Starr 1963
    - B. reynosensis Ajao et al. 2022

== See also ==
- List of bacterial orders
- List of bacteria genera
