= Church of St Margaret, Heveningham =

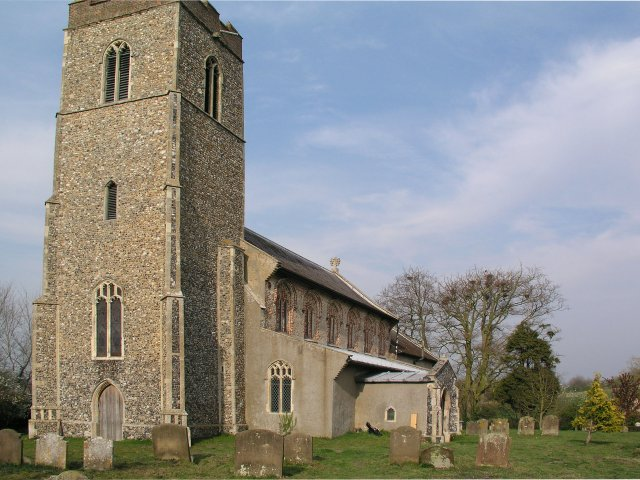
- Church of St Margaret, Heveningham
- 52.3018°N 1.4209°E
- Location: Heveningham, Suffolk, IP19 0EP
- Country: England
- Denomination: Church of England
- Previous denomination: Roman Catholic Church

History
- Status: Active

Architecture
- Functional status: Parish church
- Heritage designation: Grade I listed
- Designated: 7 December 1966

Administration
- Diocese: Diocese of St Edmundsbury and Ipswich
- Archdeaconry: Archdeaconry of Suffolk
- Deanery: Waveney and Blyth
- Parish: Heveningham and Ubbeston

Clergy
- Bishop: The Rt Revd Norman Banks (AEO)

The Church of St Margaret is a Church of England parish church in Heveningham, Suffolk. The church is a grade I listed building.

== History ==
The churches dates to the Medieval period. The chancel dates to the 14th century. The tower dates to the 15th century. The double hammerbeam nave roof dates to the early 16th century. The church was restored from 1847 to 1966.

On 7 December 1966, the church was designated a Grade I listed building.

=== Present day ===
St Margaret's is part of the Benefice of Heveningham with Ubbeston, Huntingfield and Cookley in the Archdeaconry of Suffolk of the Diocese of St Edmundsbury and Ipswich.

== Notable burials ==
- The church contains an oak tomb of Sir John Haveningham.
- Air Vice-Marshal Thomas Traill, senior RAF officer, is buried in the churchyard.
- Mary Shelton, suspected mistress of King Henry VIII, is buried in the churchyard.
