= Kedington =

Village in Suffolk, England

Coordinates: 52.093°N 0.487°E

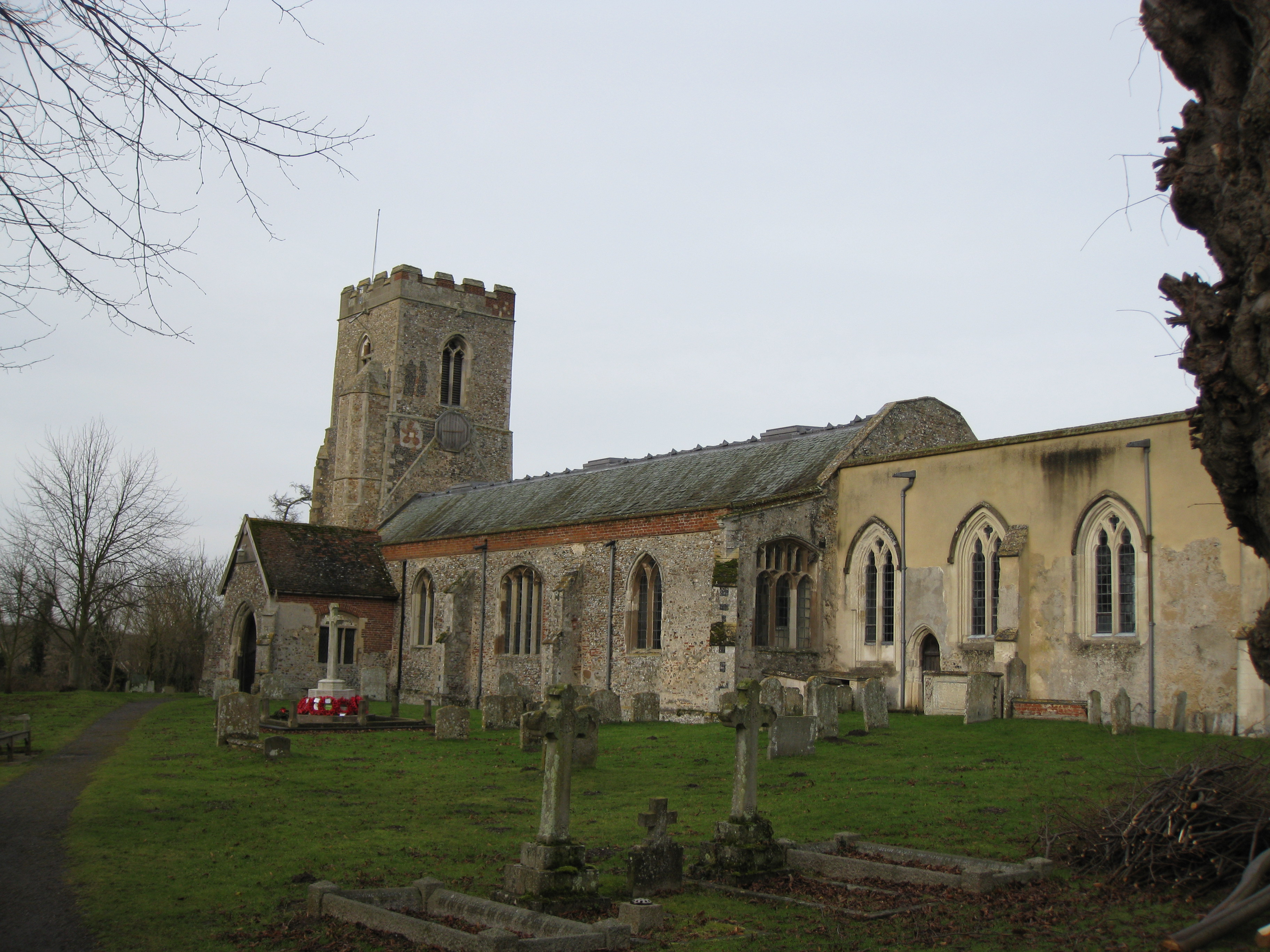
- Church of St Peter and St Paul, Kedington

- Location within Suffolk
- Population: 2,000 (2022)
- Shire county: Suffolk
- Region: East
- Country: England
- Sovereign state: United Kingdom
- Post town: Haverhill
- Postcode district: CB9
- Dialling code: 01440

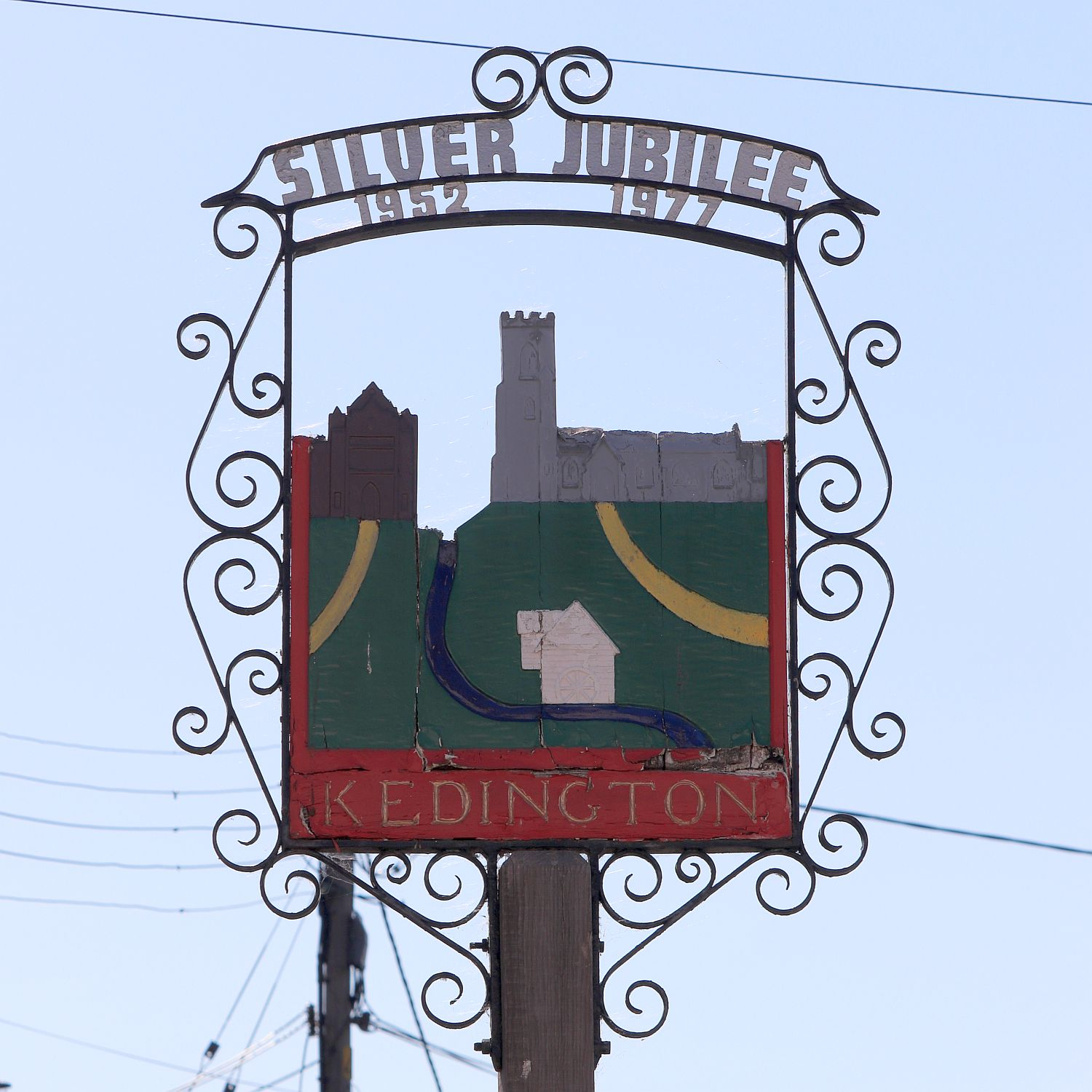
Kedington Village Sign

Kedington is a village and civil parish in the West Suffolk district of Suffolk in eastern England, located between the towns of Clare and Haverhill in the south-west of Suffolk.

== History ==
Known as Kidituna in the Domesday Book (1086), there were 280 people living there at that time. Part of it was formerly in Essex. The puritan, Thomas Barnardiston studied under Calvin in Geneva during the reign of Queen Mary I, but returned to Kedington after the accession of Queen Elizabeth I in 1558 and the consequent Elizabethan Religious Settlement.

== Church of St Peter and St Paul ==
Kedington's church, St Peter and St Paul, is one of the historical treasures of East Anglia, dating from the late 13th century. However, the church is built on top of a Roman villa, the remains of which can be viewed under small trap doors located in the pews towards the back of the nave. There is an Anglo-Saxon stone cross located above the altar on the east wall of the church. This was found near to the church and is believed to be from a church dating from Saxon times. Kedington comes in the top rank of small English churches and is renowned for its unmodernised interior and Barnardiston tombs. John Betjeman understandably christened Kedington ' a village Westminster Abbey'.

The Anglican minister, Samuel Fairclough, was born nearby in Haverhill and was appointed rector in 1629. However in 1662, following the Archbishop of Canterbury's passage of the Act of Uniformity, Fairclough was ejected for non-conformity and replaced by John Tillotson, who served in the role 1663-1664 and went on to become Archbishop of Canterbury.

== Notable residents ==
- Samuel Fairclough (1594-1677), nonconformist divine and Rector of Kedington 1629-1662
- John Tillotson, Archbishop of Canterbury from 1691 to 1694 and Rector of Kedington 1663-1664.
- Philip Skippon (1641-1691), traveller, writer, diarist, landowner and Member of Parliament for Dunwich.
- Peter Wildy (1920-1987), Virologist and Chair of Pathology at the University of Cambridge.
- Francis Crick, winner of the Nobel Prize for the discovery of DNA, and his wife Odile had a cottage in Kedington for about 15 years in the 1960s to 1970s
