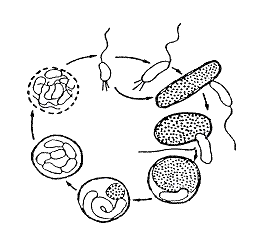

Scientific classification
- Domain: Bacteria
- Kingdom: Pseudomonadati
- Phylum: Bdellovibrionota
- Class: Bdellovibrionia; Waite et al. 2020
- Order: Bdellovibrionales; Garrity, Bell & Lilburn 2006

Family
- Bdellovibrionaceae

Synonyms
- Pseudobdellovibrionaceae Waite et al. 2022

= Bdellovibrionales =

Order of bacteria

Bdellovibrionales is an order of Pseudomonadota.

== See also ==
- List of bacterial orders
- List of bacteria genera
