= Silvanigrellales =

Scientific classification
- Domain: Bacteria
- Kingdom: Pseudomonadati
- Phylum: Bdellovibrionota
- Class: Oligoflexia
- Order: Silvanigrellales; Hahn et al. 2017

Families
- Silvanigrellaceae

Order of bacteria

The Silvanigrellales are an order of the phylum Bdellovibrionota. They include currently only the single family Silvanigrellaceae.

== See also ==
- List of bacterial orders
- List of bacteria genera
