= Heveningham =

Village in Suffolk, England

Coordinates: 52.302129°N 1.421569°E

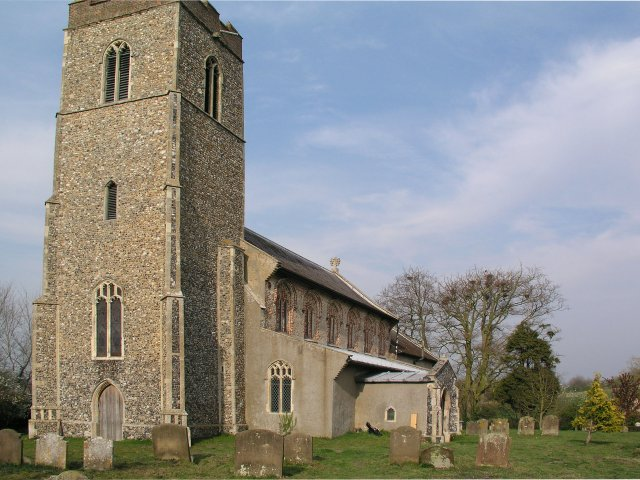
- Church of St Margaret

- Location within Suffolk
- Population: 223 (2011) inc the parish of Ubbeston
- District: East Suffolk
- Shire county: Suffolk
- Region: East
- Country: England
- Sovereign state: United Kingdom
- Post town: Halesworth
- Postcode district: IP19
- Police: Suffolk
- Fire: Suffolk
- Ambulance: East of England
- UK Parliament: Suffolk Coastal

Heveningham is a village and civil parish in the East Suffolk district of Suffolk in eastern England. Located four miles south-west of Halesworth, in 2005 it had a population of 120.

Heveningham Hall, a country house built in 1777, once belonged to the Lords Huntingfield.

== History ==
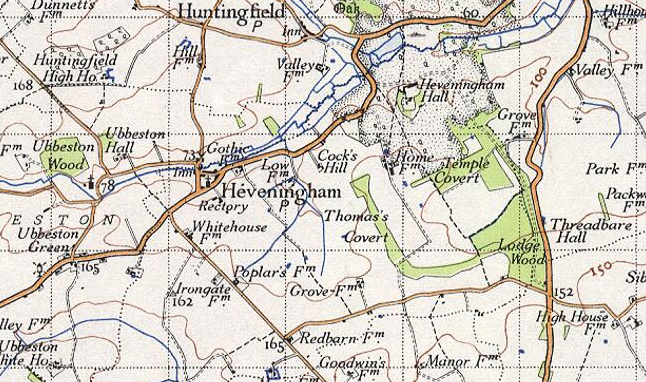
Heveningham in 1945

In 1870–1872, John Marius Wilson's Imperial Gazetteer of England and Wales described the parish as: ”Haveningham, or Heveningham, a village and parish in Blything district, Suffolk.”

== Historic buildings ==
=== Church of St Margaret ===
St. Margaret's Church, built in 1539, is a Perpendicular style parish church and is now a Grade I listed building.

=== Heveningham Hall ===
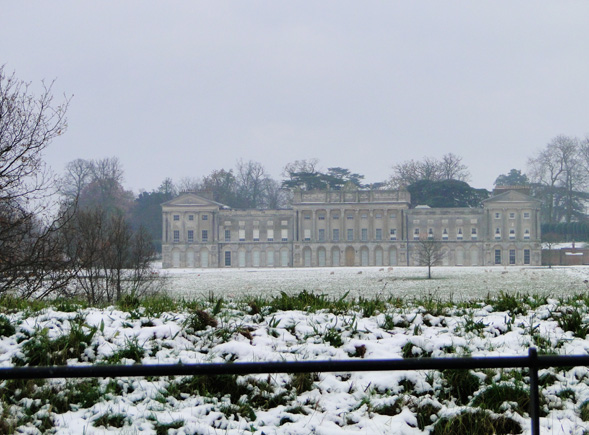
Heveningham Hall

Heveningham Hall is a Grade I listed building that stands on the site of an earlier house built for William Heveningham in 1658.

== Country fair ==
The summer fair is held annually in the grounds of Heveningham Hall and is a landmark event for the Parish, as it highlights the local rural traditions. Activities include a Sheep Show, Clay Pigeon Shooting, and a Poultry Exhibition.

== Population ==
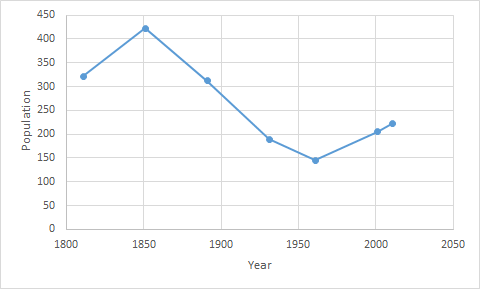

Around the year 1800 the population of the parish was higher than it is now, at approximately 310 people. There was a sharp decrease in the hundred years between 1850 and 1950, when the population fell from approximately 425 to 150. The decrease in population in the 19th century could be due to emigration towards urban centres due to the Industrial Revolution and undoubtedly due to both the First World War and Second World War. Since 1960, there has been a gradual increase in population, and in 2011, including Ubbeston 225 people occupied the area.

== Demographics ==
=== Age profile ===
In 2011 there were 52 people under the age of twenty-one, and approximately fifty people between the ages of 61 and 100, this created a large proportion of the population who were dependent on the working population. There were around 123 people between the ages of 20–61 considered economically active.

=== Ethnicity ===
According to the census, in 2011 Heveningham had a population of 223 people, of whom 218 described themselves as of White English/Welsh/Northern Irish/British origin, which is 97% of the total population. Of the remaining five people, four described themselves as White from outside the United Kingdom, and one claimed to be of Mixed/Multiple Ethnicity; White/Black Caribbean.

Age Structure Heveningham 2011

=== Occupations ===
The 1881 census shows that agriculture, including cattle rearing, was the main occupation in Heveningham. The area was once devoted to pasture, with over sixty men working in the sector. Men dominated the working population, with fifty women at the time stating they had no specific occupation. The number of people working in the domestic sector was high (especially for women) in 1881, partly due to Heveningham Hall, where many servants were employed.

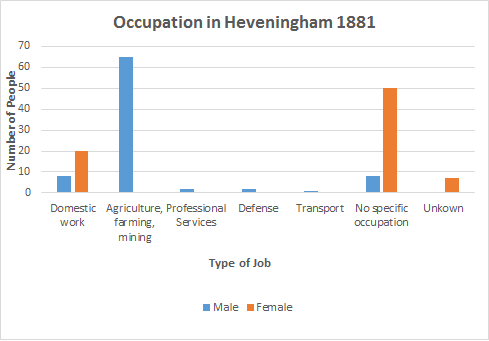
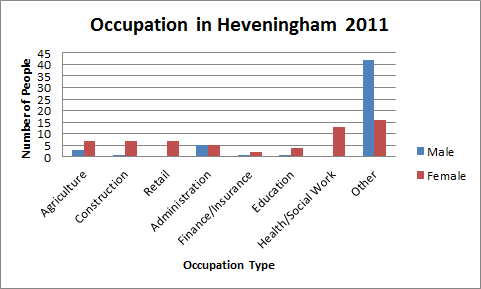

At the 2011 census, 58 women claimed to be in employment. Three were employed in the Fishing, Agriculture, and Forestry sector, and thirteen said they worked in Human Health and Social Work Activities. In contrast, 61 males claimed to be in employment in 2011. Seven worked in the Agriculture, Fishing, and forestry sector, while seven worked in construction, and six in the Professional/Scientific sector.

== Notable people ==
- Sir Edward Echyngham (died 1527) owned the manor of Blaunchards in Heveningham
- Henry Heveningham (1651–1700)
- Joshua Vanneck, 1st Baron Huntingfield (1745–1816)
- Joshua Vanneck, 1st Baron Huntingfield (1778–1844)
- Bruce Reynolds, later the brains behind the Great Train Robbery of 1963, was evacuated to Heveningham during the Second World War.
- Air Vice Marshal Thomas Traill (1899–1973) and the actor Stratford Johns ended their lives in the village.
