= Richard Fairclough (divine) =

Richard Fairclough (1621–1682) was an English nonconformist divine.

== Life ==
Fairclough was the eldest son of Samuel Fairclough (1594–1677). Samuel was a preacher in Suffolk until he lost his post during the Great Ejection of 1622.

Richard graduated M.A. as a member of Emmanuel College, Cambridge. He served at Somerset with Benjamin Whichcot and then moved to the rectory at Frome; however, after the Act of Uniformity 1662, he lost his post. While a resident in Thames Street, London, he was licensed in 1672 to be a general Presbyterian teacher.

He died in London 4 July 1682 and was buried in Bunhill Fields. John Howe preached at his funeral. According to Howe, Fairclough was "a man of a clear, distinct understanding, of a very quick, discerning, and penetrating judgment, that would on a sudden … strike through knotty difficulties into the inward center of truth with such a felicity that things seem'd to offer themselves to him which are wont to cost others a troublesome search."

== Publications ==
He was author of "The nature, possibility, and duty of a true believer attaining to a certain knowledge of his effectual vocation, eternal election, and final perseverance to glory", a sermon printed in Nathaniel Vincent's The Morning-Exercise against Popery, 1675, and in vol. vi. of Samuel Annesley's The Morning Exercises, 1844, &c. Edmund Calamy also mentions 'An Abridgment of some of his latter Sermons to his beloved people at Mells'.
