= Peter Fairclough (cricketer) =

English cricketer

Peter Moss Fairclough (25 September 1887 – 16 November 1952) was an English cricketer who played for Lancashire from 1911 to 1923. He was born in Bickershaw and died in Blackpool. Throughout his career, he appeared in 20 first-class matches as a right-handed batsman who bowled slow left-arm orthodox. He scored 140 runs, with the highest score of 19, and held nine catches. Fairclough took 52 wickets, with his best bowling figure being seven for 27.
