= Oligoflexia =

Scientific classification
- Domain: Bacteria
- Kingdom: Pseudomonadati
- Phylum: Bdellovibrionota
- Class: Oligoflexia; Nakai et al. 2014

Orders
- Oligoflexales; Silvanigrellales

Synonyms
- "Oligoflexidae" Cavalier-Smith 2020

Class of bacteria

The Oligoflexia are a class of the phylum Bdellovibrionota. All species of this group are all Gram-negative.

== Phylogeny ==
The currently accepted taxonomy is based on the List of Prokaryotic names with Standing in Nomenclature (LSPN) and National Center for Biotechnology Information (NCBI).

16S rRNA based LTP_10_2024

- "Oligoflexaeota"
  - Oligoflexia
    - Oligoflexales
    - Silvanigrellales

120 marker proteins based GTDB 10-RS226

- "Oligoflexaeota"
  - Oligoflexia
    - Oligoflexales Nakai et al. 2014
    - Silvanigrellales Hahn et al. 2017

== See also ==
- List of bacterial orders
- List of bacteria genera
