= Bdellovibrionota =

Scientific classification
- Domain: Bacteria
- Kingdom: Pseudomonadati
- Phylum: Bdellovibrionota; Waite et al. 2021

Classes
- Bacteriovoracia; Bdellovibrionia; Oligoflexia

Synonyms
- "Bdellovibrionota" Waite et al. 2020; "Oligoflexaeota"

Phylum of bacteria

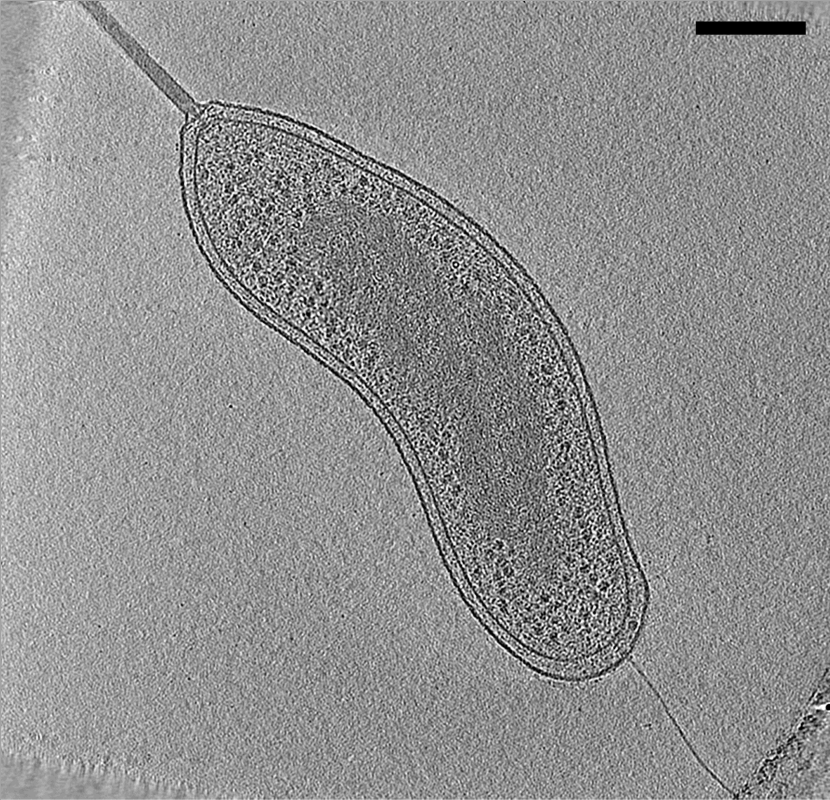
Central slice through a cryotomogram of an intact Bdellovibrio bacteriovorus cell. Scale bar 200 nm.

Bdellovibrionota is a phylum of bacteria.

== Phylogeny ==
The currently accepted taxonomy is based on the List of Prokaryotic names with Standing in Nomenclature (LSPN) and National Center for Biotechnology Information (NCBI).

16S rRNA based LTP_10_2024

- Oligoflexia
  - Oligoflexales
  - Silvanigrellales

- Bacteriovoracia
  Bacteriovoracales

- Bdellovibrionia
  Bdellovibrionales

120 marker proteins based GTDB 10-RS226

- "Oligoflexaeota"
  - Oligoflexia
    - Oligoflexales
    - Silvanigrellales

- Bdellovibrionota
  - Bacteriovoracia
    Bacteriovoracales
  - Bdellovibrionia
    Bdellovibrionales

== See also ==
- List of bacterial orders
- List of bacteria genera
