= St. Mary's Church =

St. Mary's Church, St. Mary the Virgin's Church, St. Mary Church, Saint Mary Church, or other variations on the name, is a commonly used name for specific churches of various Christian denominations. Notable uses of the term may refer to:

== Albania ==
- St. Mary's Church, Krujë
- St. Mary's Church, Moscopole
- St. Mary's Church on Drianos, Zervat
- St. Mary's Church, Elbasan
- St. Mary's Church, Himarë
- St. Mary's Church, Leusë
- St. Mary's Church, Maligrad
- St. Mary's Church, Mbreshtan
- St. Mary's Church, Melçan
- St. Mary's Church, Surrel
- St. Mary's Church, Vau i Dejës
- St. Mary's Monastery Church, Dhivër
- St. Mary's Monastery Church, Koshovicë
- St. Mary's Monastery Church, Lubonjë
- St. Mary's Monastery Church, Piqeras
- St. Mary's Monastery Church, Tranoshisht
- St. Mary's Monastery, Goranxi
- St. Mary's Monastery, Kakome

== Australia ==
- St Mary's Anglican Church, Busselton, Western Australia
- St Mary's Anglican Church, Kangaroo Point, Queensland
- St Mary's Anglican Church, Mount Morgan, Queensland
- St Mary's Anglican Church, Waverley, New South Wales
- St Mary's Roman Catholic Church, Mudgee, New South Wales
- St Mary's Church, Ipswich, Queensland
- St Mary's Church, Lethbridge, Victoria
- St Mary's Church, Maryborough, Queensland
- St Mary's Church, Middle Swan, Western Australia
- St Mary's Church, South Brisbane, Queensland
- St Mary's Church & Convent, Townsville, Queensland
- St Mary's Church, Williamstown, Victoria
- First St Mary's Church, Warwick, Queensland
- Second St Mary's Church, Warwick, Queensland
- St Mary's on the Sturt, Anglican church in South Australia

== Azerbaijan ==
- Church of the Immaculate Conception, Baku

== Belarus ==
- St. Mary's Church, Grodno

== Belgium ==
- Saint Mary's Royal Church, Schaerbeek
- St. Mary's Church, Vaux-sous-Chèvremont

== Canada ==
- St. Mary Armenian Apostolic Church, Toronto
- St. Mary's Church (Toronto)
- St. Mary's Church, Red Deer
- St. Mary's Roman Catholic Church (Souris, Prince Edward Island)

== Cyprus ==
- St. Mary's Church, Larnaca

== Czech Republic ==
- Church of the Virgin Mary (Prague Castle)

== Denmark ==
- St. Mary's Church, Sønderborg

== Egypt ==
- Church of the Holy Virgin (Babylon El-Darag)
- Church of the Virgin Mary (Haret Zuweila)
- Saint Mary Church (Haret Elroum)

== Estonia ==
- St Mary's Church, Tartu

== Falkland Islands ==
- St. Mary's Church, Falkland Islands

== Faroe Islands ==
- St. Mary's Church, Tórshavn

== Finland ==
- St. Mary's Church of Lappee, Lappeenranta
- St. Mary's Church, Helsinki
- St. Mary's Church, Turku

== France ==
- Church of St. Mary, Corneilla-de-Conflent

== Germany ==
- Church of the Assumption of the Blessed Virgin Mary, Frauenau, Bavaria
- Domkirche St. Marien, Sankt Georg, Hamburg
- Liebfrauen, Frankfurt
- Liebfrauenmünster, Wolframs-Eschenbach
- Maria Regina Martyrum (St. Mary Queen of the Martyrs Church), Berlin
- Marienkirche, Neubrandenburg
- Marienkirche, Wismar, a church with an 80 m (260 ft) high tower in Wismar
- Marienkirche, Wolfenbüttel
- Marienkirche, Zwickau, a Gothic church with a 285 ft (87 m) spire in Zwickau
- Marktkirche Unser Lieben Frauen (Liebfrauenkirche, Marienkirche), Halle
- St. Marien am Behnitz, Berlin
- St. Mary's Cathedral, Hamburg
- St. Mary's Church, Bad Homburg
- St. Mary's Church, Berlin
- St. Mary's Church, Fuhlsbüttel, Hamburg
- St. Mary's Church, Helminghausen
- St. Mary's Church, Himmelpforten
- St. Mary's Church, Lübeck
- St. Mary's Church, Marienberg
- St. Mary's Church, Mühlhausen
- St. Mary's Church, Osnabrück
- St. Mary's Church, Ramersdorf
- St. Mary's Church, Reutlingen
- St. Mary's Church, Rostock
- St. Mary's Church, Stralsund
- Überwasserkirche, Münster

== Hungary ==
- Church of St. Mary the Virgin, Budapest

== India ==
- Gunadala Matha Shrine, in Vijayawada
- Padri Ki Haveli (St. Mary's Church), Patna, Bihar
- St. Mary's Church, Vendore, Thrissur, Kerala
- St. Mary's Church, Chennai
- St. Mary's Church, in Vallavilai
- St. Mary's Church, Marady
- St. Mary's Church, Noida
- St. Mary's Church, Pune
- St. Mary's Church, Secunderabad
- St. Mary's Jacobite Soonoro Cathedral, Angamaly, Ernakulam, Kerala
- St. Mary's Jacobite Syrian Cathedral, Manarcad, Kottayam, Kerala

== Iran ==
- Church of the Holy Mother of God, Darashamb
- Saint Mary Church of Tabriz
- Sourp Asdvadzadzin (Sarnaq)
- St. Mary Church, Isfahan
- St. Mary Church, Shiraz
- St. Mary Church, Urmia

== Ireland ==
=== County Donegal ===
- St. Mary's Church, Inis Cealtra

=== Dublin Region ===
- St Mary's Church, Haddington Road, Dublin
- St Mary's Church, Mary Street, Dublin

=== County Kildare ===
- St. Mary's Church, Castlemartin

=== County Kilkenny ===
- St. Mary's Church, Callan
- St. Mary's Church, Kilkenny
- St. Mary's Collegiate Church, Gowran

=== County Meath ===
- St Mary's Church, Navan

=== County Tipperary ===
- Old St. Mary's Church, Clonmel

=== County Wexford ===
- St. Mary's Church, Kilmore, County Wexford
- St. Mary's Church, New Ross

=== County Westmeath ===
- Church of St. Mary, Moate
- Church of St. Mary, Raharney
- St. Mary's Church of the Assumption, Kinnegad
- St. Mary's Church, Athlone
- St. Mary's Church, Collinstown
- St. Mary's Roman Catholic Church, Athlone

== Malta ==
- Cathedral of the Assumption, Victoria
- Parish Church of St Mary, Attard
- Parish Church of St Mary, Birkirkara
- Parish Church of the Assumption of Mary, Żebbuġ
- Parish Church of the Assumption, Qrendi
- St Mary's Chapel, Bir Miftuħ
- St Mary's Church, Għaxaq
- St Mary's Church, Gudja
- St Mary's Church, Mosta
- St Mary's Church, Mqabba
- St Mary's Church, Żurrieq

== Netherlands ==
- Protestant church of Bears
- Protestant church of Buitenpost
- Protestant church of Oentsjerk
- St Mary's Church, Rotterdam
- St. Mary's Church, Utrecht

== New Zealand ==
- St Mary of the Angels, Wellington
- St Mary's Cathedral, Auckland
- St Mary's Cathedral, Wellington
- St Mary's Catholic Church, Hokitika
- St Mary's Church, Tikitiki
- St Mary's Church, Timaru
- Taranaki Cathedral, the Church of St Mary (historically known as St. Mary's Church)

== Norway ==
- St Mary's Church, Askim
- St Mary's Church, Bergen
- St Mary's Church, Gran, one of the Sister churches (Norway)
- St Mary's Church, Lillehammer
- St Mary's Church, Oslo
- St Mary's Church, Stabekk

== Pakistan ==
- St. Mary's Church, Gulberg
- St. Mary's Church, Sukkur

== Philippines ==
- Church of Saint Mary the Virgin (Sagada)

== Poland ==
- Basilica of Our Lady of Licheń
- Basilica of the Assumption of the Blessed Virgin Mary, Krzeszów
- Blessed Virgin Mary Church, Pińczów
- Cathedral Basilica of the Assumption of the Blessed Virgin Mary, Kielce
- Cathedral of the Blessed Virgin Mary, Płock
- Church of the Visitation of the Blessed Virgin Mary, Kraków
- Collegiate Basilica of the Birth of the Blessed Virgin Mary, Wiślica
- St. Mary's Basilica, Kraków
- St. Mary's Church, Chojna
- St. Mary's Church, Gdańsk
- St. Mary's Church, Katowice
- St. Mary's Church, Stargard

== Romania ==
- Church of the Virgin Mary, Focșani
- Church of the Virgin Mary, Galați

== Slovakia ==
- Church of the Blessed Virgin Mary, Staré
- Church of the Virgin Mary (Senica)

== Spain ==
- St. Mary's Church, Peniscola

== Sri Lanka ==
- St. Mary's Cathedral, Batticaloa
- St. Mary's Cathedral, Galle
- St. Mary's Cathedral, Jaffna
- St. Mary's Church, Negombo

== Switzerland ==
- Liebfrauenkapelle (Rapperswil) (St. Mary Chapel)

== Syria ==
- Saint Mary Church of the Holy Belt, Homs

== Turkey ==
- Saint Mary's Catholic Church, Bornova
- Saint Mary's Catholic Church, Konak
- St. Mary Church, Diyarbakır
- St. Mary of Sakızağaç Cathedral, Istanbul

== United Arab Emirates ==
- St. Mary's Catholic Church, Dubai

== United Kingdom ==
=== England ===
==== Bedfordshire ====
- Church of Saint Mary the Virgin, Harlington, Bedfordshire
- Church of St Mary the Virgin, Henlow
- Church of St Mary the Virgin, Keysoe
- Church of St Mary the Virgin, Northill
- Church of St Mary the Virgin, Salford, Bedfordshire
- Church of St Mary the Virgin, Shelton, North Bedfordshire
- Church of St Mary the Virgin, Wootton, Bedfordshire
- Church of St Mary the Virgin, Yielden
- Church of St Mary, Everton, Bedfordshire
- St Mary's Church, Clophill
- St Mary's Church, Lower Gravenhurst
- St Mary's Church, Luton
- St Mary's Church, Potsgrove
- St Mary's Church, Woburn

==== Berkshire ====
- Church of St Mary the Virgin, Aldermaston
- Reading Minster (known also as the Minster Church of St Mary the Virgin)
- St Mary the Virgin Church, Langley
- St Mary's Church, Castle Street, Reading
- St Mary's Church, Lambourn Woodlands
- St Mary's Church, Maidenhead
- St Mary's Church, Thatcham
- St Mary's Parish Church, Slough

==== Bristol ====
- St Mary Redcliffe
- St Mary's Church, Henbury

==== Buckinghamshire ====
- St Mary Magdalene's Church, Boveney
- St Mary the Virgin, Great Brickhill
- St Mary the Virgin's Church, Aylesbury
- St Mary the Virgin's Church, Fawley
- St Mary's Church, Bletchley
- St Mary's Church, Chesham
- St Mary's Church, Edlesborough
- St Mary's Church, Fleet Marston
- St Mary's Church, Hardmead
- St Mary's Church, Hartwell
- St Mary's Church, Old Amersham
- St Mary's Church, Pitstone
- St Mary's Church, Shenley
- St Mary's Church, Whaddon, Buckinghamshire

==== Cambridgeshire ====
- Church of St Mary the Great, Cambridge
- Little St Mary's, Cambridge
- St Mary's Church, Ely
- St Mary's Church, Huntingdon
- St Mary's Church, Whaddon, Cambridgeshire

==== Cheshire ====
- Church of St Mary of the Angels, Hooton
- Church of St Mary the Virgin, Bosley
- Church of St Mary the Virgin, Wistaston
- St Mary and All Saints' Church, Great Budworth
- St Mary's and St Helen's Church, Neston
- St Mary's and St Michael's Church, Burleydam
- St Mary's Chapel, Arley
- St Mary's Chapel, High Legh
- St Mary's Church, Acton
- St Mary's Church, Astbury
- St Mary's Church, Bruera
- St Mary's Church, Coddington
- St Mary's Church, Congleton
- St Mary's Church, Crewe
- St Mary's Church, Disley
- St Mary's Church, Dodleston
- St Mary's Church, Eccleston
- St Mary's Church, Hale
- St Mary's Church, Halton
- St Mary's Church, Handbridge
- St Mary's Church, Lymm
- St Mary's Church, Nantwich
- St Mary's Church, Nether Alderley
- St Mary's Church, Pulford
- St Mary's Church, Rostherne
- St Mary's Church, Sandbach
- St Mary's Church, Thornton-le-Moors
- St Mary's Church, Tilston
- St Mary's Church, Warrington
- St Mary's Church, Weaverham
- St Mary's Church, Whitegate
- St Mary's Church, Widnes

==== Cornwall ====
- St Mary the Virgin's Church, Week St Mary
- St Mary's Church, St Mary's, Isles of Scilly
- St Mary's Old Church, St Mary's, Isles of Scilly

==== Cumbria ====
- St Mary and St Michael's Church, Great Urswick
- St Mary Magdalene's Church, Broughton-in-Furness
- St Mary of Furness Roman Catholic Church, also known as St Mary's Church, Barrow-in-Furness
- St Mary the Virgin's Church, Walney
- St Mary's Church, Abbeytown
- St Mary's Church, Allithwaite
- St Mary's Church, Dalton-in-Furness
- St Mary's Church, Gosforth
- St Mary's Church, Hethersgill
- St Mary's Church, Kirkby Lonsdale
- St Mary's Church, Penny Bridge
- St Mary's Church, Staveley
- St Mary's Church, Ulverston
- St Mary's Church, Walton
- St Mary's Church, Whicham
- St Mary's Church, Windermere
- St Mary's Church, Wreay

==== Derbyshire ====
- St Mary and St Laurence's Church, Bolsover
- St Mary the Virgin's Church, Denby
- St Mary the Virgin's Church, Newton Solney
- St Mary the Virgin's Church, South Darley
- St Mary the Virgin's Church, Weston-on-Trent
- St Mary's Church, Chaddesden
- St Mary's Church, Derby
- St Mary's Church, Sutton cum Duckmanton
- St Mary's Church, Wirksworth

==== Devon ====
- Church of St Mary the Virgin, Uffculme
- St Mary's Church, Appledore
- St Mary's Church, North Huish
- St Marychurch (village & parish), Torbay

==== Dorset ====
- St Mary the Virgin, Gillingham, Dorset
- St Mary the Virgin, Tarrant Crawford
- St Mary's Church, Charminster
- St Mary's Church, Dorchester
- St Mary's Church, Long Crichel
- St Mary's Church, Longfleet
- St Mary's Church, Springbourne
- St Mary's Church, Swanage

==== County Durham ====
- St Mary's Church, Hartlepool
- St Mary's Church, Seaham
- St Mary's Church, Stockton-on-Tees

==== East Riding of Yorkshire ====
- St Mary's Church, Beverley

==== East Sussex ====
- St Mary and St Abraam Coptic Orthodox Church, Hove
- St Mary and St Peter's Church, Wilmington
- St Mary Magdalen's Church, Brighton
- St Mary the Virgin, Brighton
- St Mary's Church, Glynde
- St Mary's Church, Hampden Park, Eastbourne
- St Mary's Church, Preston Park
- St Mary's Church, Ticehurst
- St Mary's Church, Westham

==== Essex ====
- Church of St Mary, Great Baddow
- Church of St Mary the Virgin, Harlow
- Church of St Mary the Virgin, Layer Marney
- Old St Mary's Church, West Bergholt
- St Mary the Virgin Church, Wendens Ambo
- St Mary the Virgin, Great Warley
- St Mary the Virgin's Church, Little Bromley
- St Mary the Virgin's Church, Stansted Mountfitchet
- St Mary's Buttsbury
- St Mary's Church, Burnham on Crouch
- St Mary's Church, Chickney
- St Mary's Church, Lawford
- St Mary's Church, Mundon
- St Mary's Church, Prittlewell
- St Mary's Church, Widford

==== Gloucestershire ====
- Church of St Mary the Virgin, Meysey Hampton
- St Mary of the Angels Church, Brownshill
- St Mary the Virgin, Wotton-under-Edge
- St Mary's Church, Berkeley
- St Mary's Church, Beverston
- St Mary's Church, Cheltenham
- St Mary's Church, Fairford
- St Mary's Church, Kempley
- St Mary's Church, Little Washbourne
- St Mary's Church, Prestbury
- St Mary's Church, Shipton Solars

==== Greater Manchester ====
- Church of St Mary, Hulme
- Church of St Mary in the Baum, Rochdale
- Church of St Mary the Virgin, Bowdon
- Church of St Mary the Virgin, Bury
- Church of St Mary the Virgin, Eccles
- Church of St Mary the Virgin, Prestwich
- St Mary the Virgin's Church, Deane
- St Mary the Virgin's Church, Ellenbrook
- St Mary the Virgin's Church, Leigh
- St Mary's Church, Cheadle
- St Mary's Church, Lower Ince
- St Mary's Church, Lowton
- St Mary's Church, Manchester
- St Mary's Church, Stockport
- The Hidden Gem (St Mary’s Roman Catholic Church)

==== Hampshire ====
- Old Church of St Mary the Virgin, Preston Candover
- St Mary's Church, Ashley
- St Mary's Church, Bishopstoke
- St Mary's Church, Fordingbridge
- St Mary's Church, Hartley Wespall
- St Mary's Church, Hartley Wintney
- St Mary's Church, Hayling Island
- St Mary's Church, Itchen Stoke
- St Mary's Church, Micheldever
- St Mary's Church, Portsea
- St Mary's Church, Selborne
- St Mary's Church, South Stoneham
- St Mary's Church, Southampton
- St Mary's Church, Twyford

==== Herefordshire ====
- St Mary the Virgin's Church, Yazor
- St Mary's Church, Bishop's Frome
- St Mary's Church, Foy
- St Mary's Church, Wormsley

==== Hertfordshire ====
- Church of St Mary the Virgin, Baldock
- St Mary Magdalene's Church, Caldecote
- St Mary the Virgin's Church, Yazor
- St Mary's Church, Hemel Hempstead
- St Mary's Church, Hitchin
- St Mary's Church, Little Hormead
- St Mary's Church, Northchurch
- St Mary's Church, Watford
- St Mary's Church, Welwyn

==== Isle of Wight ====
- St Mary the Virgin Church, Cowes
- St Mary's Church, Brading
- St Mary's Church, Brighstone
- St Mary's Church, Brook
- St Mary's Church, Carisbrooke

==== Kent ====
- Church of St Mary the Virgin, Fordwich
- Church of St Mary the Virgin, Reculver
- St Mary the Virgin Church, Thurnham
- St Mary the Virgin Church, Westerham
- St Mary's Church, Burham
- St Mary's Church, Capel-le-Ferne
- St Mary's Church, Chilham
- St Mary's Church, Dover
- St Mary's Church, Eastwell
- St Mary's Church, Hadlow
- St Mary's Church, Higham
- St Mary's Church, Lamberhurst
- St Mary's Church, Leigh
- St Mary's Church, Lenham
- St Mary's Church, Luddenham
- St Mary's Church, Nettlestead
- St Mary's Church, Reculver
- St Mary's Church, Sandwich
- St Mary's Church, Selling
- St Mary's Church, Sundridge
- St Mary's Church, Walmer
- St Mary's Parish Church, Ashford

==== Lancashire ====
- Church of St Mary and St Michael, Bonds
- Church of St Mary le Ghyll, Barnoldswick
- Church of St Mary of the Assumption, Burnley
- St Mary Magdalene's Church, Ribbleton
- St Mary's and All Saints Church, Whalley
- St Mary's Church, Bolton-le-Sands
- St Mary's Church, Borwick
- St Mary's Church, Fernyhalgh
- St Mary's Church, Fleetwood
- St Mary's Church, Goosnargh
- St Mary's Church, Leyland
- St Mary's Church, Mellor
- St Mary's Church, Morecambe
- St Mary's Church, Newchurch in Pendle
- St Mary's Church, Penwortham
- St Mary's Church, Preston
- St Mary's Church, Tarleton
- St Mary's Church, Yealand Conyers

==== Leicestershire ====
- St Mary the Virgin's Church, Bottesford
- St Mary's Church, Anstey
- St Mary's Church, Barkby
- St Mary's Church, Bitteswell
- St Mary's Church, Brentingby
- St Mary's Church, Garthorpe
- St Mary's Church, Loughborough
- St Mary's Church, Melton Mowbray
- St Mary's Church, Queniborough

==== Lincolnshire ====
- Lincoln Cathedral (Cathedral Church of the Blessed Virgin Mary of Lincoln)
- St Mary and St Peter's Church, Harlaxton
- St Mary's Church, Barnetby
- St Mary's Church, Barton-upon-Humber
- St Mary's Church, Grantham
- St Mary's Church, Grimsby
- St Mary's Church, Horncastle
- St Mary's Church, Mablethorpe
- St Mary's Church, North Cockerington
- St Mary's Church, Stamford
- St Mary's Church, Welton
- Stow Minster (The Minster Church of St Mary, Stow-in-Lindsey)

==== London ====
- St Mary Abchurch
- St Mary Aldermary
- St Mary le Strand
- St Mary the Boltons
- St Mary the Virgin, East Barnet
- St Mary the Virgin, Monken Hadley
- St Mary the Virgin, Mortlake
- St Mary the Virgin's Church, Chessington
- St Mary with St Alban
- St Mary Woolnoth
- St Mary-at-Finchley Church
- St Mary-at-Hill
- St Mary-le-Bow
- St Mary's, Bryanston Square
- St Mary's Church, Barnes
- St Mary's Church, Battersea
- St Mary's Church, Blackheath
- St Mary's Church, Charing Cross Road
- St Mary's Church, Chislehurst
- St Mary's Church, Croydon
- St Mary's Church, Downe
- St Mary's Church, Ealing
- St Mary's Church, Edmonton
- St Mary's Church, Greenwich
- St Mary's Church, Hampstead
- St Mary's Church, Hanwell
- St Mary's Church, Harrow on the Hill
- St Mary's Church, Hendon
- St Mary's Church, Ilford
- St Mary's Church, Islington
- St Mary's Church, Norwood Green
- St Mary's Church, Putney
- St Mary's Church, Rotherhithe
- St Mary's Church, Somers Town
- St Mary's Church, Summerstown
- St Mary's Church, Tottenham
- St Mary's Church, Twickenham
- St Mary's Church, Walthamstow
- St Mary's Church, Welling
- St Mary's Church, Willesden
- St Mary's Church, Wimbledon
- St Mary's Greek Orthodox Church, Wood Green, also known as St Mary's Cathedral
- St Mary's New Church, Stoke Newington (parish)
- St Mary's Old Church, Stoke Newington
- St Mary's Parish Church, Hampton
- St Mary's Roman Catholic Church, Clapham

==== Merseyside ====
- Prescot Parish Church, dedicated to St Mary
- St Mary's Church, Billinge
- St Mary's Church, Eastham
- St Mary's Church, Grassendale
- St Mary's Church, Knowsley
- St Mary's Church, Presbytery and Convent, Little Crosby
- St Mary's Church, Walton-on-the-Hill
- St Mary's Church, Wavertree
- St Mary's Church, West Derby, Liverpool
- St Mary's Church, Woolton

==== Norfolk ====
- St Mary the Virgin's Church, Wiggenhall
- St Mary's Church, Barton Bendish
- St Mary's Church, East Bradenham
- St Mary's Church, East Ruston
- St Mary's Church, Elsing
- St Mary's Church, Fordham
- St Mary's Church, Heacham
- St Mary's Church, Holme-next-the-Sea
- St Mary's Church, Islington, Norfolk
- St Mary's Church, Moulton
- St Mary's Church, Old Hunstanton
- St Mary's Church, Snettisham
- St Mary's Church, Winfarthing

==== Northamptonshire ====
- St Mary Magdalene, Geddington
- St Mary the Virgin's Church, Maidwell
- St Mary's Church, Higham Ferrers

==== North Yorkshire ====
- Church of St Mary the Virgin, Masham
- Church of St Mary, Lastingham
- Church of St Mary, Levisham
- Church of St Mary, Wharram
- St Mary the Virgin's Church, Great Ouseburn
- St Mary's Catholic Church, Carlton
- St Mary's Church, Birdforth
- St Mary's Church, Conistone
- St Mary's Church, Harrogate
- St Mary's Church, Lead
- St Mary's Church, Myton-on-Swale
- St Mary's Church, Roecliffe
- St Mary's Church, Scarborough
- St Mary's Church, South Cowton
- St Mary's Church, Stainburn
- St Mary's Church, Tadcaster
- St Mary's Church, Whitby
- St Mary's, Studley Royal

==== Northumberland ====
- St Mary's Church, Hexham
- St Mary's, High Church

==== Nottinghamshire ====
- Church of St Mary the Virgin, Clumber Park
- Church of St Mary the Virgin, Plumtree
- St Mary the Virgin's Church, West Stockwith
- St Mary's Church, Arnold
- St Mary's Church, Attenborough
- St Mary's Church, Barnstone
- St Mary's Church, Bleasby
- St Mary's Church, Bunny
- St Mary's Church, Car Colston
- St Mary's Church, Carlton-on-Trent
- St Mary's Church, East Leake
- St Mary's Church, Edwinstowe
- St Mary's Church, Greasley
- St Mary's Church, Lowdham
- St Mary's Church, Norton Cuckney
- St Mary's Church, Nottingham
- St Mary's Church, Radcliffe on Trent
- St Mary's Church, Westwood
- St Mary's Church, Wollaton Park
- St Mary's Church, Worksop

==== Oxfordshire ====
- Chapel of St Mary at Smith Gate, Oxford
- St Mary the Virgin's Church, Black Bourton
- St Mary's Church, Banbury
- St Mary's Church, Chastleton
- St Mary's Church, Newnham Murren
- St Mary's Church, North Leigh
- St Mary's Church, Pyrton
- University Church of St Mary the Virgin, Oxford

==== Rutland ====
- Church of St Mary the Virgin, Ketton
- St Mary the Virgin's Church, Ayston

==== Shropshire ====
- Church of St Mary, Bitterley
- Church of St. Mary Magdalene, Bridgnorth
- St Mary Magdalene's Church, Battlefield
- St Mary the Virgin's Church, Bromfield
- St Mary's Church, Acton Burnell
- St Mary's Church, Burford
- St Mary's Church, Cleeton St Mary
- St Mary's Church, Cleobury Mortimer
- St Mary's Church, Edstaston
- St Mary's Church, Ellesmere
- St Mary's Church, Hopesay
- St Mary's Church, Madeley
- St Mary's Church, Shrewsbury

==== Somerset ====
- Church of St Mary & All Saints, Broomfield
- Church of St Mary and St Peter, Winford
- Church of St Mary Magdalene, Chewton Mendip
- Church of St Mary Magdalene, Ditcheat
- Church of St Mary Magdalene, Great Elm
- Church of St Mary Magdalene, Stocklinch
- Church of St Mary Magdalene, Winsford
- Church of St Mary the Virgin, Barrington
- Church of St Mary the Virgin, Batcombe
- Church of St Mary the Virgin, Chard
- Church of St Mary the Virgin, Croscombe
- Church of St Mary the Virgin, East Stoke
- Church of St Mary the Virgin, Isle Abbotts
- Church of St Mary the Virgin, Nettlecombe
- Church of St Mary the Virgin, Norton Sub Hamdon
- Church of St Mary the Virgin, Stanton Drew
- Church of St Mary the Virgin, Westonzoyland
- Church of St Mary, Brompton Ralph
- Church of St Mary, Christon
- Church of St Mary, Nempnett Thrubwell
- Church of St Mary, North Petherton
- Church of St Mary, Orchardleigh
- Church of St Mary, Rimpton
- Church of St Mary, Spaxton
- Church of St Mary, Witham Friary
- Church of St Mary, Woolavington
- Church of St Nicholas and the Blessed Virgin Mary, Stowey
- St Mary Magdalene, Taunton
- St Mary Magdalene's Church, Langridge
- St Mary the Virgin's Church, Bathwick
- St Mary's Church, Bathwick
- St Mary's Church, Berrow
- St Mary's Church, Bishops Lydeard
- St Mary's Church, Bridgwater
- St Mary's Church, Bruton
- St Mary's Church, Cannington
- St Mary's Church, Chedzoy
- St Mary's Church, East Brent
- St Mary's Church, Hardington
- St Mary's Church, Hemington
- St Mary's Church, Ilminster
- St Mary's Church, Kingston St Mary
- St Mary's Church, Litton
- St Mary's Church, Luccombe
- St Mary's Church, Marston Magna
- St Mary's Church, Meare
- St Mary's Church, Moorlinch
- St Mary's Church, Mudford
- St Mary's Church, Portbury
- St Mary's Church, Saltford
- St Mary's Church, Stogumber
- St Mary's Church, Wedmore
- St Mary's Church, West Buckland
- St Mary's Church, Yatton

==== South Yorkshire ====
- Church of St Mary the Virgin, Beighton
- Church of St Mary the Virgin, Sprotbrough
- Church of St Mary, Wheatley
- St Mary's Church, Barnsley
- St Mary's Church, Bolsterstone
- St Mary's Church, Bramall Lane
- St Mary's Church, Handsworth, Sheffield
- St Mary's Church, Tickhill

==== Staffordshire ====
- St Mary and St Modwen Church, Burton-on-Trent
- St Mary the Virgin Church, Uttoxeter
- St Mary the Virgin's Church, Bromfield
- St Mary's and All Saints' Church, Checkley
- St Mary's Catholic Church, Uttoxeter
- St Mary's Church, Blymhill
- St Mary's Church, Cresswell
- St Mary's Church, Lichfield
- St Mary's Church, Patshull

==== Suffolk ====
- St Mary the Virgin's Church, Cavendish
- St Mary the Virgin's Church, Stonham Parva
- St Mary's Church, Akenham
- St Mary's Church, Badley
- St Mary's Church, Brent Eleigh
- St Mary's Church, Bungay
- St Mary's Church, Bury St Edmunds
- St Mary's Church, Chilton
- Church of St Mary the Virgin, Earl Stonham
- St Mary's Church, Ickworth
- St Mary's Church, Redgrave
- St Mary's Church, Rickinghall Superior
- St Mary's Church, Washbrook
- St Mary's Church, Wortham

==== Surrey ====
- Church of St Mary the Virgin, Horsell
- Church of St Mary, Fetcham
- Church of St Mary, Stanwell
- St Mary's Church, Ewell
- St Mary's Church Oatlands, Surrey
- St Mary's Church, Stoke d'Abernon
- St Mary's, Staines

==== Teesside ====
- St Mary's Church, Longnewton

==== Tyne and Wear ====
- St Mary's Church, Sunderland

==== Warwickshire ====
- St Mary's Church, Atherstone
- St Mary's Church, Halford
- St Mary's Church, Leamington Spa
- St Mary's Church, Warwick

==== West Midlands ====
- St Mary & All Saints, Walsall
- St Mary and St John Church, Wolverhampton
- St Mary's Church, Aston
- St Mary's Church, Aldridge
- St Mary's Church, Handsworth
- St Mary's Church, Moseley
- St Mary's Church, Selly Oak
- St Mary's Church, Temple Balsall
- St Mary's Church, Walsall
- St Mary's Church, Walsgrave

==== West Sussex ====
- Church of St Mary the Blessed Virgin, Sompting
- St Mary de Haura Church, Shoreham-by-Sea
- St Mary Our Lady, Sidlesham
- St Mary the Virgin's Church, North Stoke
- St Mary's Church, Broadwater
- St Mary's Church, Goring-by-Sea
- St Mary's Church, Shipley
- St Mary's Church, Slaugham
- St Mary's Church, Walberton
- St Mary's Church, West Chiltington

==== West Yorkshire ====
- St Mary the Virgin Church, Boston Spa
- St Mary the Virgin's Church, Middleton
- St Mary's Church, Garforth
- St Mary's Church, Halifax
- St Mary's Church, Swillington
- St Mary's in the Wood Church, Morley

==== Wiltshire ====
- St Mary's Church, Calne
- St Mary's Church, Chute Forest
- St Mary's Church, East Knoyle
- St Mary's Church, Maddington
- St Mary's Church, Marlborough
- St Mary's Church, Old Dilton
- St Mary's Church, Purton
- St Mary's Church, Shrewton
- St Mary's Church, South Tidworth
- St Mary's Church, Whaddon, Wiltshire
- St Mary's Church, Wilton

==== Worcestershire ====
- St Mary the Virgin, Hanbury
- St Mary's Church, Kyre
- St Mary's Church, Tenbury Wells
- St Mary's Church, Wythall

=== Northern Ireland ===
- Church of the Blessed Virgin Mary, Derrytrasna, County Armagh
- St Mary's Church of Ireland Parish Church, Macosquin, County Londonderry
- St Mary's Church of Ireland, Newry
- St Mary’s RC Church, Macosquin, County Londonderry
- St Mary's, Chapel Street (formerly Newry Cathedral), Newry

=== Scotland ===
- Chapel of St. Mary, Colonsay, Argyll
- Church of St Mary on the Rock, St Andrews
- Church of St Mary the Virgin, Arbroath, Angus
- Dairsie Old Church, formerly St Mary's Church, Fife
- Dundee Parish Church (St Mary's)
- Priory Church, South Queensferry, or St Mary's Episcopal Church, South Queensferry
- Saint Mary's, Calton, Glasgow
- St Mary, Our Lady of Victories Church, Dundee
- St Mary's, Fochabers, Moray
- St Mary's Cathedral, Edinburgh (Episcopal), Edinburgh
- St Mary's Chapel, Rattray, Aberdeenshire
- St Mary's Chapel, Wyre, Orkney
- St Mary's Church, Auchindoir, Aberdeenshire
- St Mary's Church, Cove Bay, Aberdeenshire
- St Mary's Church, Stirling
- St Mary's Collegiate Church, Haddington, East Lothian
- St Mary's Episcopal Church, Dunblane, Stirling
- St Mary's Parish Church, Kirkintilloch

=== Wales ===
==== Anglesey ====
- St Mary's Church, Bodewryd
- St Mary's Church, Holyhead
- St Mary's Church, Llanfair Mathafarn Eithaf
- St Mary's Church, Llanfair-yn-Neubwll
- St Mary's Church, Llanfair-yn-y-Cwmwd
- St Mary's Church, Llanfair-yng-Nghornwy
- St Mary's Church, Llanfairpwllgwyngyll
- St Mary's Church, Llannerch-y-medd
- St Mary's Church, Menai Bridge
- St Mary's Church, Pentraeth
- St Mary's Church, Rhodogeidio
- St Mary's Church, Tal-y-llyn

==== Bridgend ====
- St Mary's Church, Coity Higher

==== Cardiff ====
- St Mary's Church, Cardiff, collapsed and abandoned c. 1700

==== Carmarthenshire ====
- St Mary's Church, Kidwelly
- St Mary's Church, Llanfair-ar-y-bryn
- St Mary's Church, Llanllwch

==== Ceredigion ====
- St Mary's Church, Cardigan

==== Conwy ====
- St Mary and All Saints' Church, Conwy
- St Mary's Church, Betws-y-Coed
- St Mary's Church, Llanrwst, demolished

==== Denbighshire ====
- St Mary's Church, Betws Gwerful Goch
- St Mary's Church, Derwen

==== Flintshire ====
- Church of St Mary the Virgin, Halkyn
- St Mary's Church, Cilcain
- St Mary's Church, Mold
- St Mary's Church, Northop Hall

==== Gwynedd ====
- St Mary's Church, Penllech

==== Monmouthshire ====
- Church of St Mary the Virgin, Llanfair Kilgeddin
- Prior Church of St Mary, Usk
- Priory Church of St Mary, Abergavenny
- St Mary's Church, Caldicot
- St Mary's Church, Chepstow
- St Mary's Church, Magor
- St Mary's Priory Church, Monmouth

==== Neath Port Talbot ====
- St Mary's Church, Aberavon

==== Newport ====
- St Mary the Virgin Parish Church, Marshfield
- St Mary's Church, Llanwern
- St Mary's Church, Malpas
- St Mary's Church, Nash

==== Pembrokeshire ====
- St Mary's Church, Haverfordwest
- St Mary's Church, Tenby

==== Powys ====
- St Mary's Church, Brecon

==== Swansea ====
- St Mary's Church, Pennard
- St Mary's Church, Swansea

==== Vale of Glamorgan ====
- St Mary Church, Llanfair, Vale of Glamorgan

=== Isle of Man ===
See List of churches on the Isle of Man

- Ballure Church (St Mary's), Ballure, Isle of Man
- St Mary (Abbey Church), Ballasalla
- St Mary (Old Church), Ballaugh (defunct)
- St Mary de Ballaugh, Ballaugh
- St Mary, Port St Mary
- St Mary of the Isle Church, Douglas
- St Mary's Catholic Church, Castletown
- St Mary's on the Harbour, Castletown

=== Tristan da Cunha ===
- St Mary's Church, Edinburgh of the Seven Seas

== United States ==
=== Alabama ===
- St. Mary of the Visitation Catholic Church (Huntsville, Alabama)

=== Arizona ===
- Old St. Mary's Church (Tempe, Arizona)
- Saint Mary's Catholic Church (Kingman, Arizona)
- St. Mary's Basilica (Phoenix), Arizona, also known and the National Register of Historic Places (NRHP)-listed as St. Mary's Church
- St. Mary's Episcopal Church (Phoenix)

=== Arkansas ===
- St. Mary's Catholic Church (Helena-West Helena, Arkansas)

=== California ===
- St. Mary Coptic Orthodox Church (Los Angeles)

=== Colorado ===
- St. Mary's Catholic Church (Colorado Springs, Colorado)

=== Connecticut ===
- St. Mary Church (Bridgeport, Connecticut)
- St. Mary Church (Norwalk, Connecticut)
- St. Mary Parish (Newington, Connecticut)
- St. Mary's Church (Coventry, Connecticut)
- St. Mary's Church (Greenwich, Connecticut)
- St. Mary's Church (New Haven, Connecticut)
- St. Mary's Church (Norwich, Connecticut)
- St. Mary's Church (Stamford, Connecticut)

=== Delaware ===
- St. Mary of the Immaculate Conception Church (Wilmington, Delaware)

=== Florida ===
- St. Mary's Episcopal Church (Green Cove Springs, Florida)

=== Georgia ===
- St. Mary A.M.E. Church, Thomaston, Georgia
- Saint Mary's Catholic Church (Rome, Georgia)

=== Idaho ===
- St. Mary's Catholic Church (Boise, Idaho)
- St. Mary's Catholic Church (Caldwell, Idaho)

=== Illinois ===
- St. Mary of the Woods Catholic Church, Chicago
- St. Mary's Church (Beaverville, Illinois)
- St. Mary's Church of Gilberts
- St. Mary's Roman Catholic Church, included in Sycamore Historic District
- St. Mary's Church (Centralia, Illinois)

=== Indiana ===
- St. Mary of the Assumption Church (Avilla, Indiana)
- St. Mary's Catholic Church (Fort Wayne, Indiana)
- St. Mary's Catholic Church (Huntington, Indiana)
- St. Mary's Catholic Church (Indianapolis, Indiana)

=== Iowa ===
- Holy Family Catholic Church (Fort Madison, Iowa) (St. Mary of the Assumption Church)
- Saint Mary's Catholic Church (Dubuque, Iowa)
- St. Mary of the Visitation Catholic Church (Ottumwa, Iowa)
- St. Mary's Catholic Church (Davenport, Iowa)
- St. Mary's Catholic Church (Guttenberg, Iowa)
- St. Mary's Catholic Church (Nichols, Iowa)
- St. Mary's Catholic Church (Riverside, Iowa)
- St. Mary's Church and Rectory (Iowa City, Iowa)

=== Kansas ===
- St. Mary's Catholic Church (Purcell, Kansas)
- St. Mary's Church (St. Benedict, Kansas), (NRHP)

=== Maine ===
- St. Mary's Church (Augusta, Maine)

=== Maryland ===
- St. Mary's Catholic Church (Bryantown, Maryland)
- St. Mary's Church (Emmorton, Maryland)
- St. Mary's Roman Catholic Church (Newport, Maryland)

=== Massachusetts ===
- St. Mary's Catholic Church (Winchester, Massachusetts)
- St. Mary's Church (Dedham, Massachusetts)
- St. Mary's Episcopal Church (Dorchester, Massachusetts)
- St. Mary's Episcopal Church (Newton Lower Falls, Massachusetts)
- St. Mary's Roman Catholic Church Complex (Waltham, Massachusetts)
- St. Peter's Roman Catholic Church-St. Mary's School (Southbridge, Massachusetts)

=== Michigan ===
- Saint Mary of Good Counsel Catholic Church (Adrian, Michigan)
- St. Mary Church (Lansing)
- St. Mary Roman Catholic Church (Detroit)
- St. Mary Star of the Sea Catholic Church (Jackson, Michigan)
- St. Mary's Catholic Church (Gaylord, Michigan), listed as a Michigan State Historic Site
- St. Mary's Church Complex Historic District (Monroe, Michigan)
- St. Mary's Pro-Cathedral (Sault Ste. Marie, Michigan)

=== Minnesota ===
- Church of St. Mary (Melrose, Minnesota)
- Saint Mary's Church of the Purification (Shakopee, Minnesota)

=== Missouri ===
- St. Mary's Church (Adair, Missouri), (NRHP)
- St. Mary's Parish (Bridgeton, Missouri)

=== Montana ===
- St. Mary's Mission (Montana) (St. Mary's Church and Pharmacy), Stevensville

=== Nebraska ===
- St. Mary of the Assumption Catholic Church, School and Grottoes, Dwight (NRHP)
- St. Mary's Catholic Church (Nebraska City, Nebraska)

=== New Hampshire ===
- Ste. Marie Church (Manchester, New Hampshire)

=== New Jersey ===
- Saint Mary of Mount Virgin Roman Catholic Church, New Brunswick
- St. Mary's Church (South River, New Jersey)
- St. Mary's Church (Wharton, New Jersey)

=== New York ===
- Church of Saint Mary the Virgin (Chappaqua, New York)
- St. Mary's Church (Albany, New York)
- St. Mary's Church (Ballston Spa, New York)
- St. Mary's Church (Rochester, New York)
- St. Mary's Church (Swormville, New York)
- St. Mary's Church (Wappingers Falls, New York)
- St. Mary's-in-Tuxedo, Tuxedo Park, New York

==== New York City ====
- Church of St. Mary the Virgin (Manhattan)
- St. Margaret Mary's Church (Bronx)
- St. Mary & St. Antonios Coptic Orthodox Church, Queens
- St. Mary Church (Grand Street, Manhattan)
- St. Mary Magdalen Church (New York City), Manhattan
- St. Mary's Church (Bronx)
- St. Mary's Church (Staten Island)
- St. Mary's Episcopal Church (Brooklyn)

=== North Carolina ===
- St. Mary A.M.E. Church (Apex, North Carolina)
- St. Mary Catholic Church (Greensboro, North Carolina)
- St. Mary's Chapel (Hillsborough, North Carolina)
- St. Mary's Chapel (Raleigh, North Carolina)
- St. Mary's Episcopal Church (Asheville, North Carolina)

=== North Dakota ===
- St. Mary's Catholic Church (Medora, North Dakota)
- St. Mary's Church Non-contiguous Historic District, Hague (NRHP)

=== Ohio ===
- Old St. Mary's Church (Cincinnati, Ohio)
- Saint Mary, Mother of God Church (Columbus, Ohio)
- St. Mary Mother of the Redeemer Church (Toledo, Ohio)
- St. Mary of the Annunciation Catholic Church (Portsmouth, Ohio)
- St. Mary of the Immaculate Conception Church (Morges, Ohio)
- St. Mary's Catholic Church (Delaware, Ohio)
- St. Mary's Catholic Church (Massillon, Ohio)
- St. Mary's Catholic Church (Sandusky, Ohio)
- St. Mary's Roman Catholic Church (Elyria, Ohio)

=== Oregon ===
- St. Mary Roman Catholic Church (Eugene, Oregon)
- St. Mary's Cathedral (Portland, Oregon)
- St. Mary's Roman Catholic Church (Mount Angel, Oregon)

=== Pennsylvania ===
- Blessed Virgin Mary Catholic Church (Darby, Pennsylvania)
- St. Mary Coptic Orthodox Church (Lancaster, Pennsylvania)
- St. Mary's Church (Pittsburgh)
- St. Mary's Roman Catholic Church (Philadelphia)

=== Rhode Island ===
- St. Mary's Church and Cemetery (Crompton, Rhode Island)
- St. Mary's Church Complex (Newport, Rhode Island)
- St. Mary's Church of the Immaculate Conception Complex, Pawtucket

=== South Carolina ===
- St. Mary of the Annunciation Catholic Church (Charleston, South Carolina)

=== South Dakota ===
- St. Mary's Catholic Church (Salem, South Dakota)

=== Tennessee ===
- St. Mary's Catholic Church (Memphis, Tennessee)
- St. Mary's Catholic Church (Nashville, Tennessee)

=== Texas ===
- Cathedral of Saint Mary (Austin, Texas)
- Saint Mary's Catholic Church (Victoria, Texas)
- St. Mary's Catholic Church (Brenham, Texas)
- St. Mary's Catholic Church (Fredericksburg, Texas)
- St. Mary's Church of the Assumption (Praha, Texas)

=== Virginia ===
- St. Mary (Alexandria, Virginia); see Lyceum (Alexandria, Virginia)
- St. Mary of the Immaculate Conception Roman Catholic Church (Fredericksburg, Virginia)
- St. Mary's Church (Fairfax Station, Virginia)
- St. Mary's Church (Norfolk, Virginia)

=== Wisconsin ===
- Old St. Mary's Church (Milwaukee, Wisconsin)
- St. Mary of the Angels Church and Monastery, Green Bay
- St. Mary's Catholic Church (Kaukauna, Wisconsin)
- St. Mary's Parish (Appleton, Wisconsin)
- St. Mary's Roman Catholic Church (Port Washington, Wisconsin)

=== Wyoming ===
- St. Mary's Catholic Cathedral (Cheyenne, Wyoming)

== See also ==
- Church of the Mother of God (disambiguation)
- Iglesia de Santa María (disambiguation)
- St Mary Magdalene Church (disambiguation)
- St Mary the Virgin (disambiguation)
- St. Mary and St. George's Church (disambiguation)
- St. Mary and St. Leonard's Church (disambiguation)
- St. Mary and St. Michael's Church (disambiguation)
- St. Mary and St. Nicholas's Church (disambiguation)
- St. Mary of the Assumption Church (disambiguation)
- St. Mary's (disambiguation)
- St. Mary's Assumption Church (disambiguation)
- St. Mary's Basilica (disambiguation)
- St. Mary's Cathedral (disambiguation)
- St. Mary's Chapel (disambiguation)
- St. Mary's Episcopal Church (disambiguation)
- St. Mary's Orthodox Church (disambiguation)
