= St. Mary of the Assumption Church =

St. Mary of the Assumption Church can refer to:

- St. Mary of the Assumption Church (Avilla, Indiana)
- Saint Mary of the Assumption Church (Chicago), Illinois
- St. Mary of the Assumption Church (Dedham, Massachusetts)
- St. Mary of the Assumption Catholic Church, School and Grottoes, Dwight, Nebraska
- St. Mary of the Assumption Church (Fort Worth), Texas
- St. Mary of the Assumption Church and School, Park City, Utah

== See also ==
- St. Mary's Church (disambiguation)
- St. Mary's Assumption Church (disambiguation)
