= St. Mary's Orthodox Church =

St. Mary's Orthodox Church may refer to:

- St. Mary's Coptic Orthodox Church Massarra, Egypt
- St Mary's Orthodox Church, Kallooppara, India
- St. Mary's Orthodox Church, Maikavu, India
- St. Mary's Orthodox Valiyapally, India
- St Mary's Greek Orthodox Church, Wood Green, United Kingdom
- St. Mary Orthodox Church (Cambridge, Massachusetts), United States
- St. Mary's Orthodox Church (West Virginia), United States
- St. Mary Coptic Orthodox Church (Lancaster, Pennsylvania), United States
- St. Mary Coptic Orthodox Church (Los Angeles), United States
- St. Mary Coptic Orthodox Church (Raleigh, North Carolina), United States

== See also ==
- St Mary and St Abraam Coptic Orthodox Church, Hove, United Kingdom
- St. Mary & St. Antonios Coptic Orthodox Church, New York, United States
- St. Mary's Church (disambiguation)
