= St. Mary's Assumption Church =

St. Mary's Assumption Church may refer to:

- St. Mary's Assumption Church, Sławno
- St. Mary's Assumption Church (Cottonport, Louisiana), listed on the National Register of Historic Places in Avoyelles Parish, Louisiana
- St. Mary's Assumption Church (New Orleans, Louisiana), listed on the National Register of Historic Places in Orleans Parish, Louisiana
- St. Mary's Assumption Catholic Church, listed on the National Register of Historic Places in Iron County, Michigan

== See also ==
- Church of the Assumption (disambiguation)
- St. Mary of the Assumption Church (disambiguation)
- St. Mary's Church (disambiguation)
