= St. Mary's Chapel =

St. Mary's Chapel may refer to:

== Ireland ==
- St. Marys Chapel of Ease, Dublin

== United Kingdom ==
=== England ===
- St. Mary's Chapel, Jesmond, Newcastle upon Tyne
- St Mary's Church, Hampstead, London
- St Mary's Chapel, High Legh, Cheshire
- Ss Mary & Everilda, Everingham, Yorkshire
- Chantry Chapel of St Mary the Virgin, Wakefield, West Yorkshire

=== Northern Ireland ===
- St. Mary's Chapel, Maguiresbridge, County Fermanagh

=== Scotland ===
- St Mary's Chapel, Crosskirk 12th-century
- St Mary's Chapel, Rattray
- St Mary's Chapel, Wyre, Orkney
- Chapel of St. Mary and St. Nathalan, ruined chapel, Stonehaven

== United States ==
- St. Mary's Chapel (Adams County, Mississippi)
- St. Mary's Chapel (Hillsborough, North Carolina)
- St. Mary's Chapel (Raleigh, North Carolina)
- St. Mary's Seminary Chapel, Baltimore, Maryland

== See also ==
- St. Mary's Church (disambiguation)
- St. Mary's Cathedral (disambiguation)
