= St. Mary and St. George's Church =

St. Mary and St. George's Church may refer to:

- St. Mary & St. George Anglican Church, Jasper, Alberta Canada (destroyed by fire in 2024)
- St Mary and St George Church, Comberford, Staffordshire, England
- St Mary and St George Church, High Wycombe, Buckinghamshire, England
- St Mary and St George's Coptic Orthodox Church, Nottingham, England

== See also ==
- St George and St Mary's Church, Church Gresley, Derbyshire, England
- Cathedral and Collegiate Church of St Mary, St Denys and St George, known as Manchester Cathedral, England
- St Mary's Church (disambiguation)
- St George's Church (disambiguation)
