= St. Mary Catholic Church (Greensboro, North Carolina) =

Church building in North Carolina, United States

Saint Mary Catholic Church
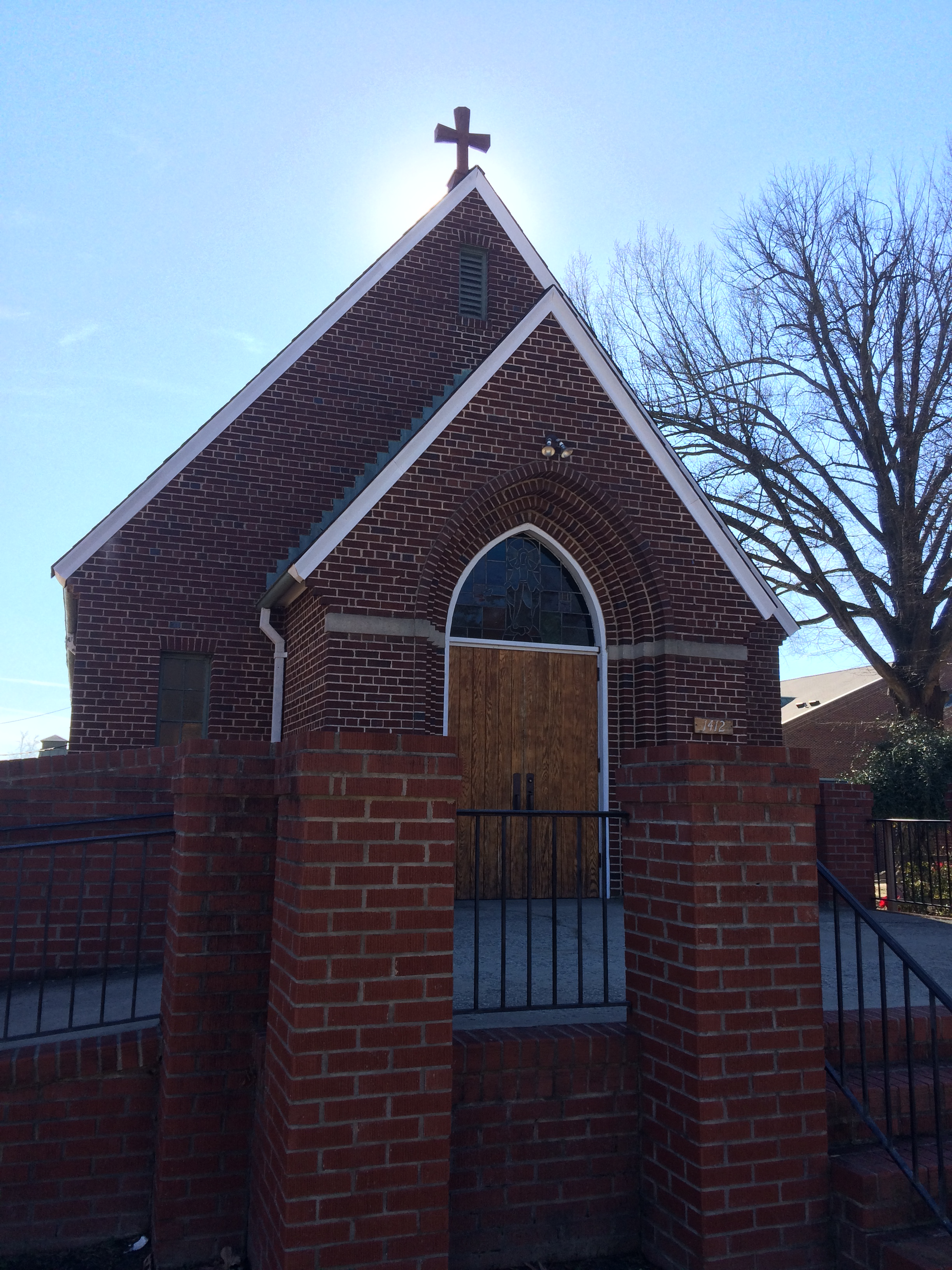
- Original building

Religion
- Affiliation: Catholic Church
- Diocese: Roman Catholic Diocese of Charlotte
- Rite: Latin Rite
- Leadership: Bishop Michael Thomas Martin

Location
- Location: 812 Duke St. Greensboro, North Carolina, United States 27401-2027
- State: North Carolina
- Interactive map of Saint Mary Catholic Church
- Coordinates: 36°3′54″N 79°46′8″W

Architecture
- Groundbreaking: 1928

St. Mary Catholic Church is a Black Catholic church in Greensboro, North Carolina, United States, which originally served as the Catholic parish and school for African-American Catholics in Greensboro prior to desegregation.

== History ==
St. Benedict's Church was the first Catholic church in Greensboro, founded in 1877 and later receiving funds from St Katharine Drexel to guarantee seating for African Americans. In the 1920s, however, African-American Catholics encountered resistance. To accommodate the increasing number of African-American converts to the faith, and to counter the impact of the segregation; a new mission church, Saint Mary's Catholic Church, and a school were built.

The Josephites—Fr Charles Hannigan, SSJ in particular—staffed the parish, and the Daughters of Charity of Saint Vincent de Paul, who at the time staffed the St. Leos' Hospital in Greensboro, provided staff for the school. The first Mass was celebrated at St. Mary's on September 16, 1928.

St. Mary's Church, originally having a mostly African-American congregation, was consecrated with its first Mass by Bishop William J. Hafey of Raleigh on Sept. 16, 1928. That same month, at the invitation of Bishop Hafey, Daughters of Charity of St. Vincent de Paul from Baltimore, Md., opened the parish school, Our Lady of Miraculous Medal, to a dozen children. The student population rapidly grew to exceed 100. The great majority of the students were African-American. Many of the original students, their children and grandchildren were still parishioners of St. Mary's in 2016.

Our Lady of Miraculous Medal School was closed in 1972. When the Diocese of Raleigh was divided and the Diocese of Charlotte was created, St. Mary's fell under the jurisdiction of the Diocese of Charlotte. In October 1973 St. Mary's Church officially changed from its traditional role as an African-American parish into an integrated territorial parish.

In the 1970s many refugees from Asia and Africa began arriving in Greensboro and many joined the parish. Around the turn of the millennium, one-third of the parishioners at St. Mary's were African-American, one-third white, and one-third exiles from civil wars in Asia and Africa, and Latin American countries. There were also a great number of parishioners from the above regions that joined St. Mary's through family ties to the church.

In the early 2000s a new church building for St. Mary's was built off of East Lee Street. Both the original church building and new building are used for celebrations of Mass.

In 2014, Emmanuel O. Ukattah, a native of Nigeria and naturalized U.S. citizen, became the first Catholic deacon of African descent in the history of St. Mary's.
