= St. Mary A.M.E. Church (Apex, North Carolina) =

Methodist church in Apex, North Carolina

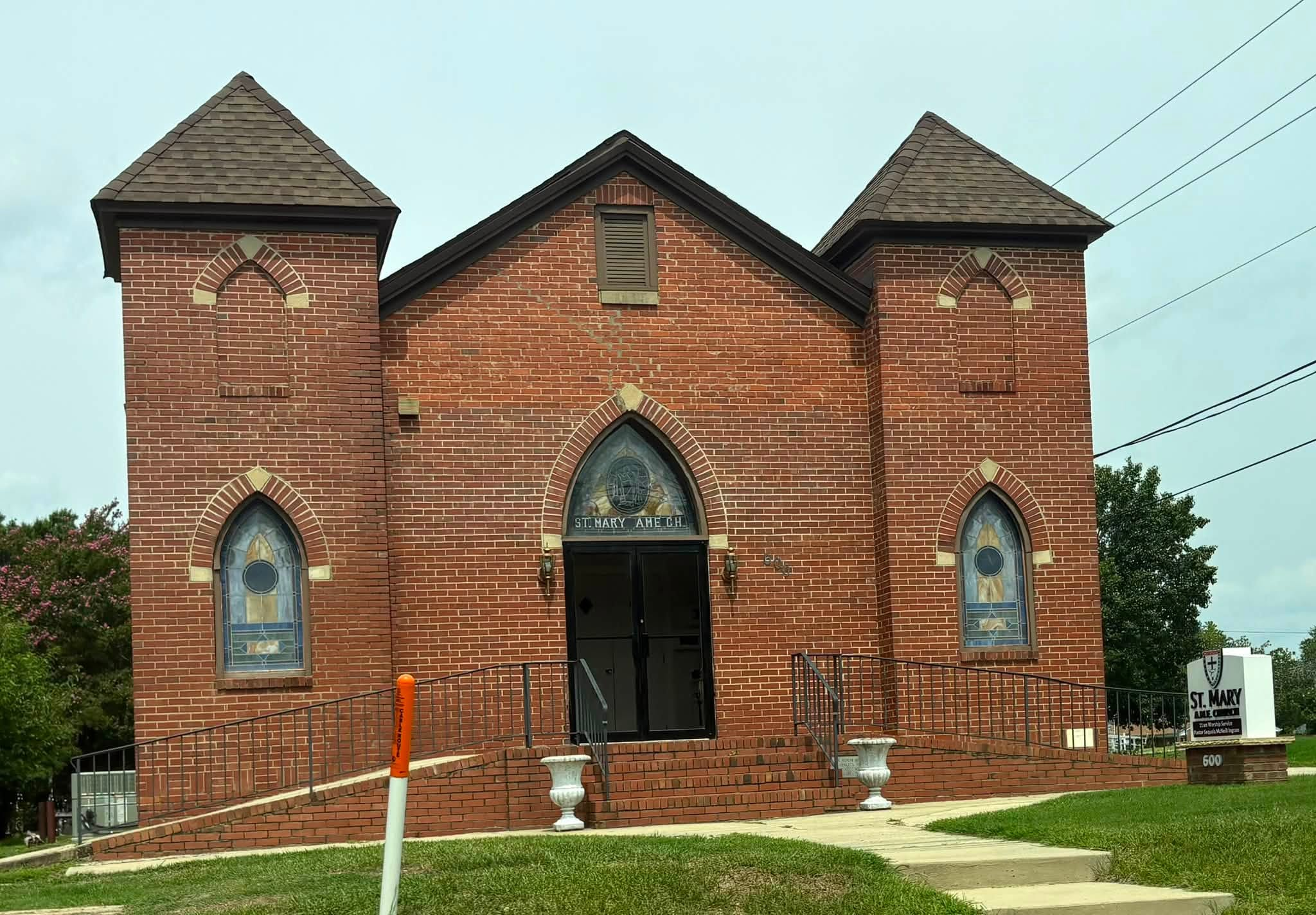
- St. Mary's in 2026

Religion
- Affiliation: African Methodist Episcopal
- Status: Active

Location
- Location: 600 S. Salem Street; Apex, North Carolina, U.S.
- State: North Carolina
- Interactive map of St. Mary A.M.E. Church
- Coordinates: 35.7245°N 78.8564°W

St. Mary A.M.E. Church is a historic African Methodist Episcopal church in Apex, North Carolina.

== History ==
The congregation was founded in 1916 at the Tent Sister's Hall on West Street in Apex. It was named St. Mary's after Mary C. Baldwin, the mother of Arnetta B. Jones. The congregation is part of the African Methodist Episcopal Church.

Renovations were made to the original structure, including a brick veneer and an annex.

The current church is located in the Justice Heights Community, historically known as Low End.
