= Church of the Virgin Mary, Galați =

Heritage site in Galați County, Romania

Church of the Virgin Mary
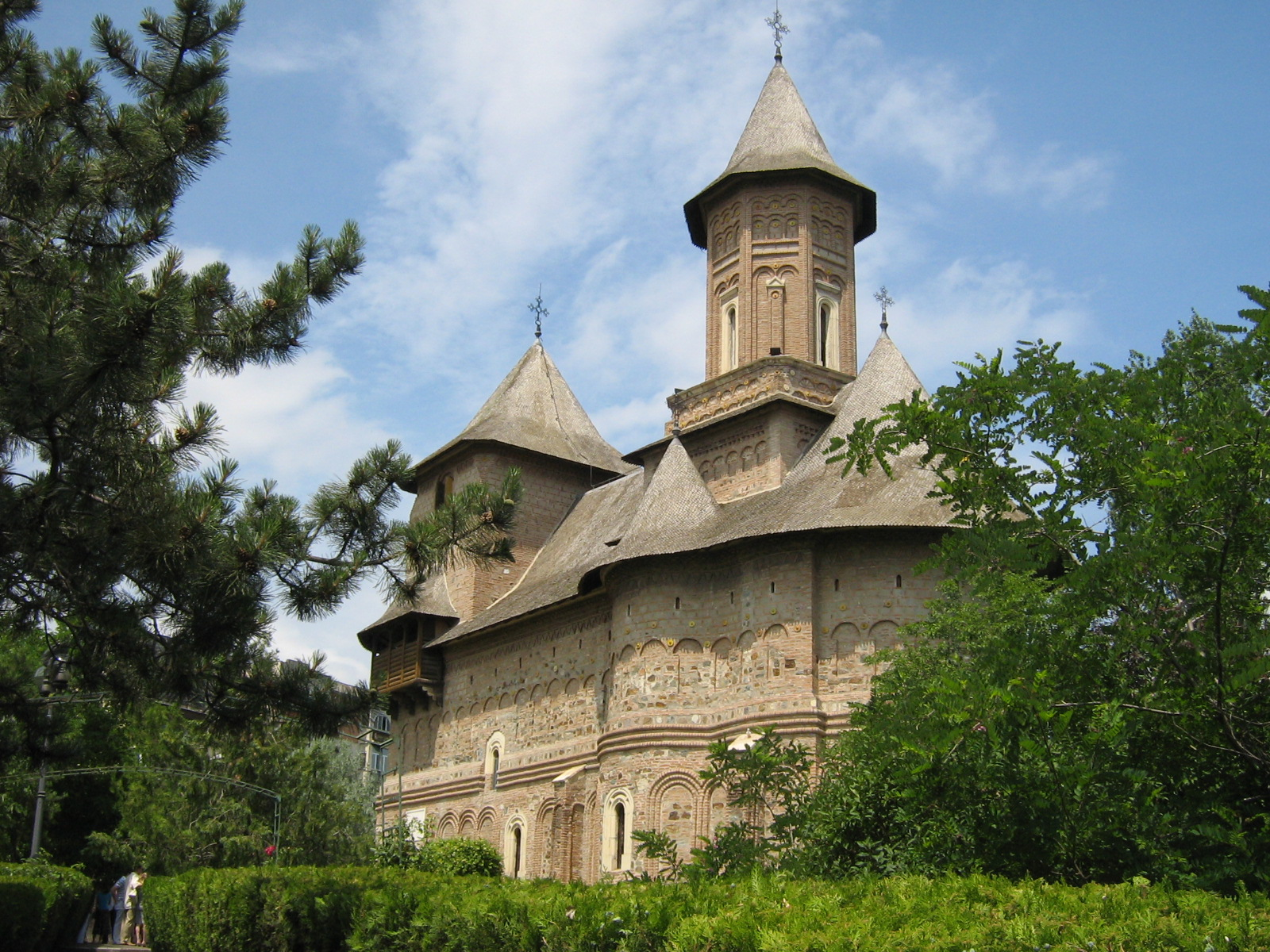
- Church of the Virgin Mary
- 45°25′46″N 28°03′11″E
- Location: Galați
- Country: Romania
- Denomination: Eastern Orthodoxy

History
- Dedication: Dormition of the Mother of God
- Dedicated: 1647

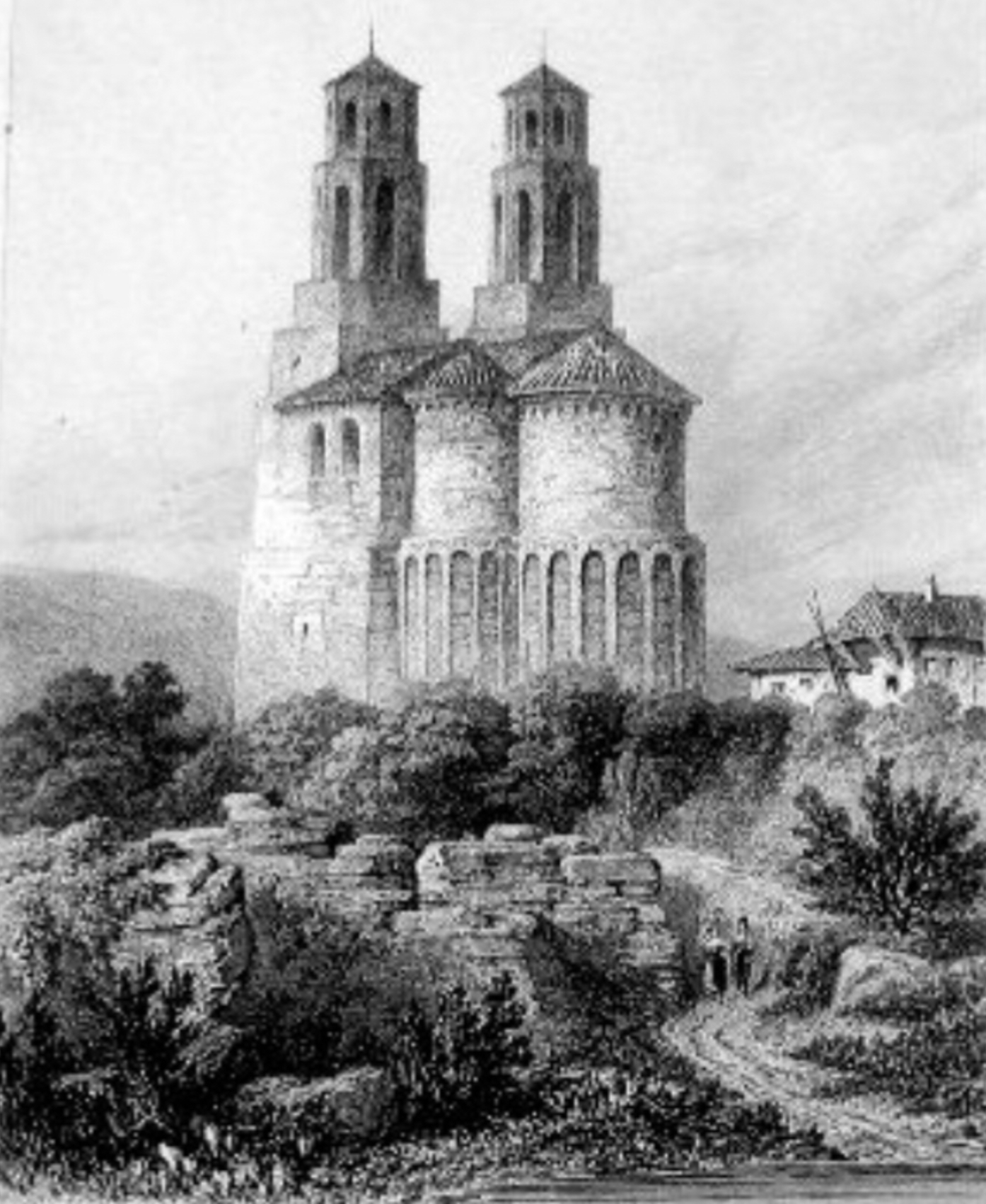
An 1856 engraving of the church

The Church of the Virgin Mary (Romanian: Biserica Sfânta Precista) is a Romanian Orthodox church located at 2 Roșiori Street in Galați, Romania. It is dedicated to the Dormition of the Mother of God.

The church was dedicated in the autumn of 1647. Located on the left bank of the Danube, it was originally a monastery, built on the site of an earlier church with the same name. Conceived as a fortress, it was built by workers brought from Transylvania. Its ktitors were the Brăila merchants Die and Șerbu, as well as the local trader Constantin Teodor. From the beginning, it was placed under the protection of the Athonite Vatopedi Monastery. While visiting in 1653, Paul of Aleppo noted its presence.

Over the ensuing two centuries, wars and robbers led to the church’s deterioration, such that by 1885, Bishop Melchisedec Ștefănescu, who had earlier served in Galați, wrote: “Today, the Precista Monastery has completely lost the appearance of a fortress. It has neither the surrounding wall, nor the magnificent bell tower, nor the three spires described by Paul of Aleppo, but only two. The Turks burned and looted it many times and turned it into a customs office, where they deposited the products they gathered from around the country, before taking them to Constantinople.”

The church owes its current appearance to the thorough consolidation and renovation work that took place in 1954–1957. The communist regime converted the church into a museum of feudal history and art during 1970, opening the following year. This closed in 1990, after the Romanian Revolution. At that point, the building became a parish church, and was rededicated in 1994.

The church is listed as a historic monument by Romania's Ministry of Culture and Religious Affairs.
