= St. Mary's Church (Swormville, New York) =

Church in New York, United States of America

Coordinates: 43°2′12.42″N 78°41′42.21″W

St. Mary's Catholic Church is a church located on the corner of Transit (New York State Route 78) and Stahley roads in Swormville, New York, in the United States. Originally known as St. Mary's Church of the Assumption at Transit, the building was constructed of about 260,000 bricks. John Nepomucene Neumann (later to be named St. John Neumann) started to visit Swormville, celebrating mass in local homes, barns and fields. In 1839 he instructed that a small house would be made to hold mass. Bishop John Timon established the first catholic church (St. Mary's) of the town of Clarence, New York. In 1861, Father Michael Schinabeak made plans for a church to be constructed. Construction began in 1862 and finished in fall of 1865. The official opening of the Church was in January 1866. In 2010 a new Church was constructed behind the old St. Mary's.

St. Mary's was one of many churches that had clergy who were accused of sexual abuse. Robert Yetter was accused by young men of making inappropriate sexual advances. The deacon of St. Mary's later would call on Bishop Richard Joseph Malone to resign.
