= Church of St Mary and St Leonard =

Church of St Mary and St Leonard and variations may refer to:

- Church of St Mary and St Leonard, Wombridge, Shropshire, England
- St Leonard & Mary, Malton, North Yorkshire, England
