= St. Mary Church (Bridgeport, Connecticut) =

Coordinates: 41°10′52.22″N 73°10′41.88″W

- St. Mary Church
- Location: 25 Sherman Street; Bridgeport, Connecticut
- Country: United States
- Denomination: Roman Catholic

Architecture
- Architect: Antinozzi Associates

Administration
- Province: Hartford
- Diocese: Bridgeport

Clergy
- Bishop: Most Rev. William E. Lori

St. Mary Parish is a Roman Catholic church in Bridgeport, Connecticut, part of the Diocese of Bridgeport.
