= St. Peter's Roman Catholic Church-St. Mary's School =

Historic church in Massachusetts, United States

- U.S. National Register of Historic Places
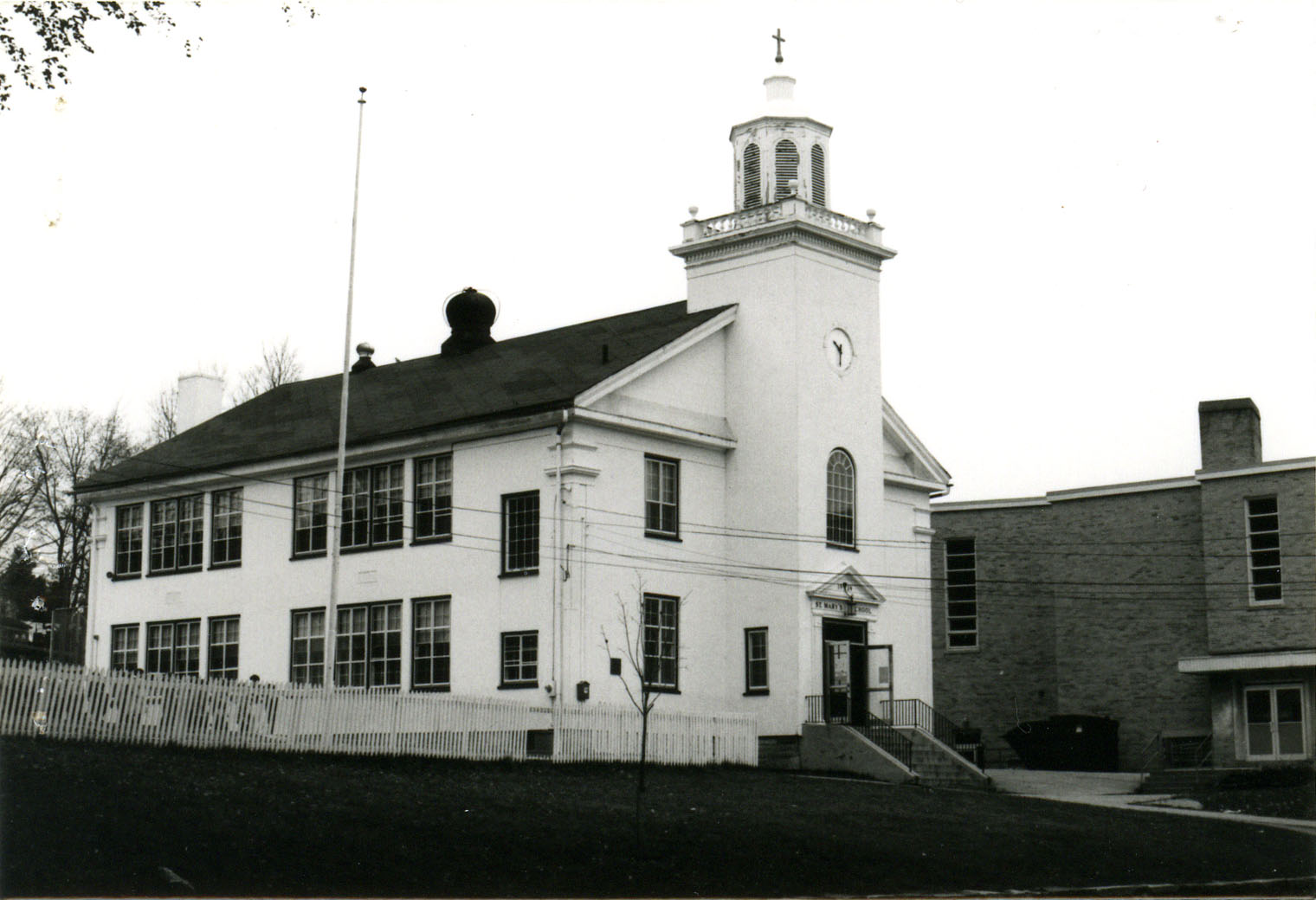
- c. 1986 photo

- Location within Massachusetts Location within the United States
- Location: Hamilton and Pine Sts., Southbridge, Massachusetts
- Coordinates: 42°4′51″N 72°2′16″W
- Built: 1853
- Architect: Cutler, Leonard
- Architectural style: Greek Revival
- MPS: Southbridge MRA
- NRHP reference No.: 89000559
- Added to NRHP: June 22, 1989

St. Peter's Roman Catholic Church—St. Mary's School was a historic church and school building at Hamilton and Pine Streets in Southbridge, Massachusetts. Built in 1853, it was the first Roman Catholic church located in south-central Massachusetts, and one of only two Greek Revival church buildings in the city. Later used as a school and parish hall, it was destroyed by fire in December 1999. The building was listed on the National Register of Historic Places in 1989.

== Description and history ==
St. Peter's was a large two-story Greek Revival wood frame building, with a projecting square tower topped by an octagonal cupola. The front facade was flushboarded, with pilasters at the corners. The entrance was set at the base of the tower, with flanking pilasters and a gabled pediment. A round-arch window was set above it in the second level, and a clock was set in the third level, in front of the main gable. The square section of the tower had a low balustrade with urn-capped posts, with the octagonal belfry set inside.

Roman Catholic services began Southbridge in 1840, serving a diversity of ethnicities drawn to jobs at the Hamilton Woolen Company mills. This church was built in 1853 to serve this growing Roman Catholic population. In 1870 a new parish church was built for the French Canadian Catholics, and this building was moved so that a new church could be built for the remaining congregants. At that time the parish was renamed from St. Peter's to St. Mary's, and this building was then adapted for use as a parish school. On December 18, 1999, the church was destroyed by a ten-year-old arsonist who had been attending catechism class.

== See also ==
- National Register of Historic Places listings in Southbridge, Massachusetts
- National Register of Historic Places listings in Worcester County, Massachusetts
