= St. Mary's Church, Vau i Dejës =

12th-century church in Albania

St Mary's Church
- Kisha e Shën Mërisë
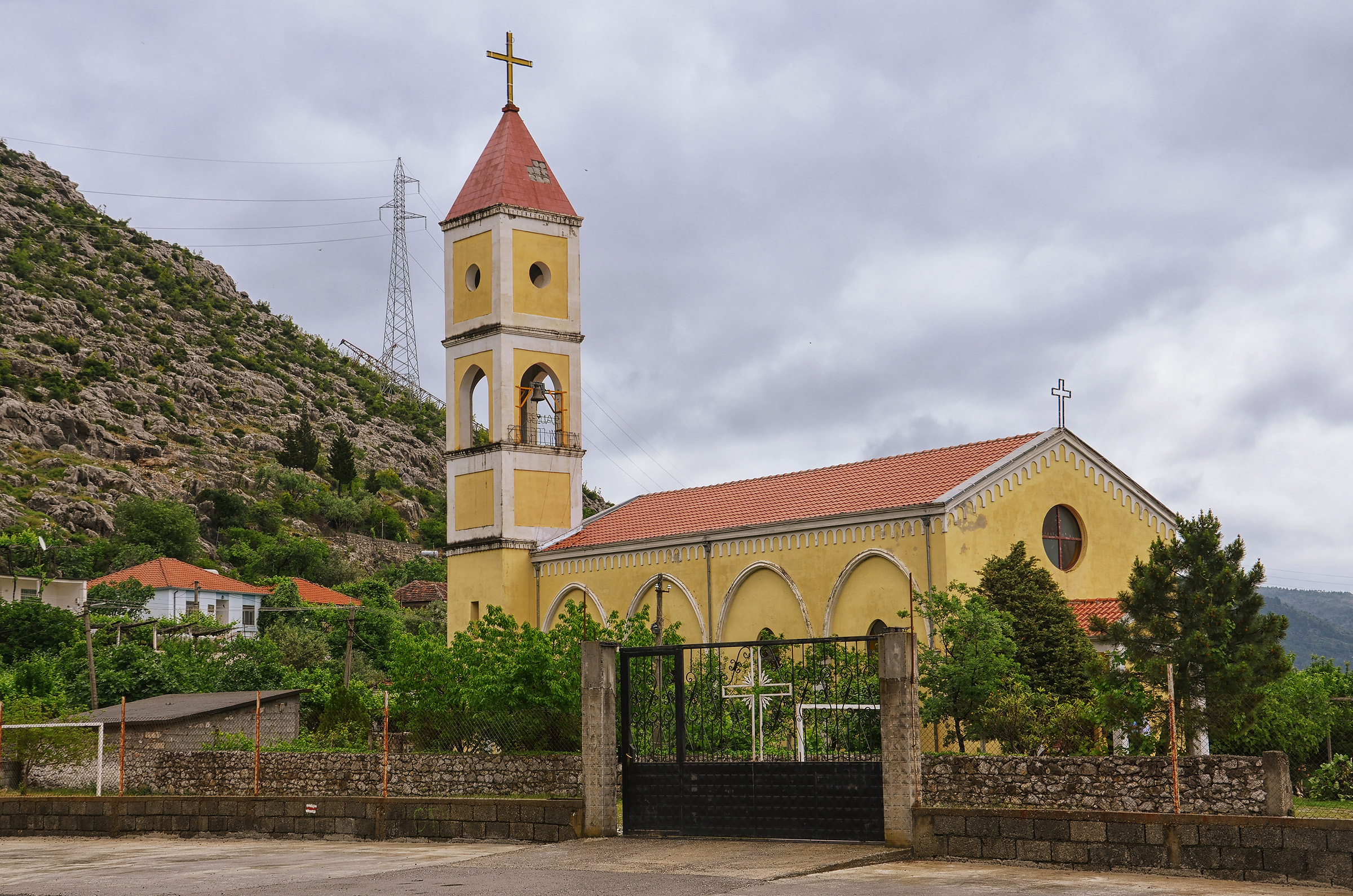
- Interactive map of the St Mary's Church area

General information
- Location: Vau i Dejës, Shkodër County
- Coordinates: 42.010651°N 19.621073°E

St Mary's Church is a Catholic church in Vau i Dejës, Shkodër, Albania. It was built in the 12th century and destroyed in 1969. The building was listed as a culture monument of Albania.

== History ==
It was blown up on May 30, 1969, on the order of Fadil Ymeri. Gani Stratizmiri filed a lawsuit with the prosecutor, because at the time, it had been a culture monument for about 20 years, and it was carrying a sign that it protected by the state. The prosecutor justified the perpetrators on the grounds that they acted without knowing that the church was a cultural monument.

== Current status ==
The church has been reconstructed near the old church ruins. The church is illustrated on the 1000 lek currency note in 1996:

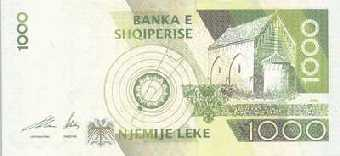
