= St. Mary's Church (Norwich, Connecticut) =

Coordinates: 41.529814°N 72.059994°W

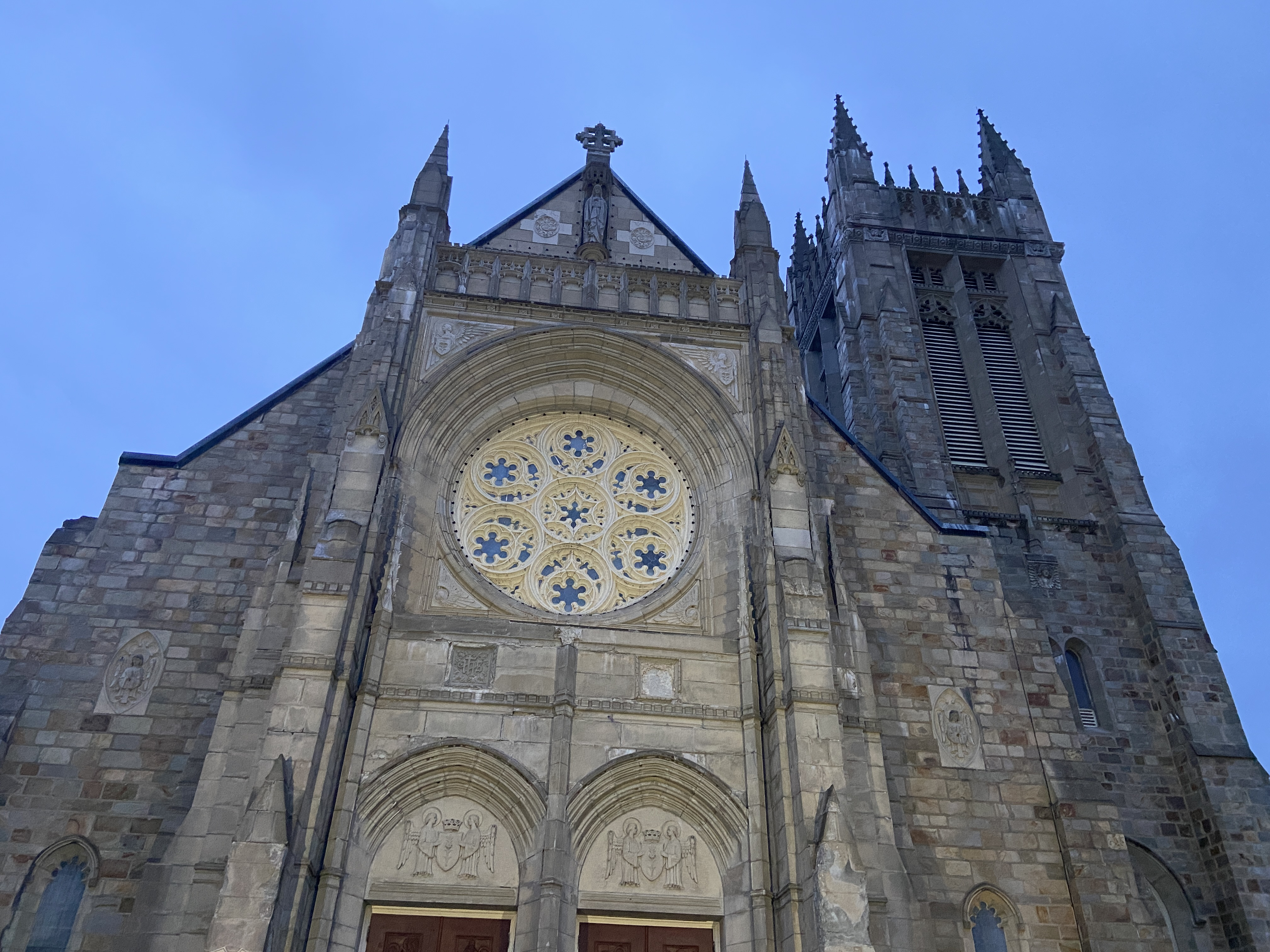

St. Mary Church is one of two constituent Roman Catholic parish churches in Norwich, CT, USA. Along with Saints Peter and Paul Church, the two parishes represent the Joint Norwich Catholic Cluster. Fr. Robert Washabaugh administer each parish, along with associate deacons and staff.

== History of St. Mary's Church ==
St. Mary's Church is the oldest Catholic church in eastern Connecticut. Originally built in 1845 to support the religious needs of immigrant Irish workers, St. Mary's Church grew and accepted new demographics of Catholics. The small Polish community eventually left St. Mary's to establish their own church, and St. Mary's now serves the spiritual needs of all area Catholics, including those from Puerto Rico, Haiti, Portugal, and other Latin American countries. The seven sacraments aren celebrated in English, Spanish, Haitian Creole, and Portuguese.

The 90-year old St. Anthony Chapel inside the church is a popular among new and current Portuguese Catholics arriving from Cape Verde. The St. Anthony Chapel bears the Portuguese inscription "A Chapel to St. Anthony, Baptized 4th day of July 1926" over its entrance. While it fell into disrepair from 1926 to 1976, in 1977 the chapel was restored with the blessing of the Bishop of Norwich, the Most Rev. Daniel P. Reilly, and Rev. Thomas Bride. A Capela do Santo Antonio, Inc., a non-profit, 501 c(3) exempt organization, was established to collect grants and donations. In 2003, the chapel was listed on the State Register of Historic Places by the Connecticut Historical Commission.

== History of St. Joseph Church, Saints Peter and Paul Church, and the Joint Norwich Catholic Cluster ==
St. Joseph Church was established in 1904, with Lithuanian priest Fr. John Ambot, for Polish immigrants who had moved from the St. Mary's Church community. in 1911, Fr. Ignatius Maciejewski supervised the addition of a convent and school under the stewardship of the Sisters of the Holy Family of Nazareth. The current St. Joseph Church structure was built in 1962, where Polish traditions are emphasized in the parish's liturgical worship. The parish also cooperates with St. Vincent de Paul Place to minister to impoverished communities.

Ss. Peter and Paul Church was built in 1938 to improve accessibility to Catholic worship in West Norwich, CT, where the church building sits on an open park.

== See also ==
- Roman Catholic Diocese of Norwich
- Bishop Daniel Cote
- Norwich, Connecticut
