= St. Mary's Church, Sukkur =

St Mary's Church
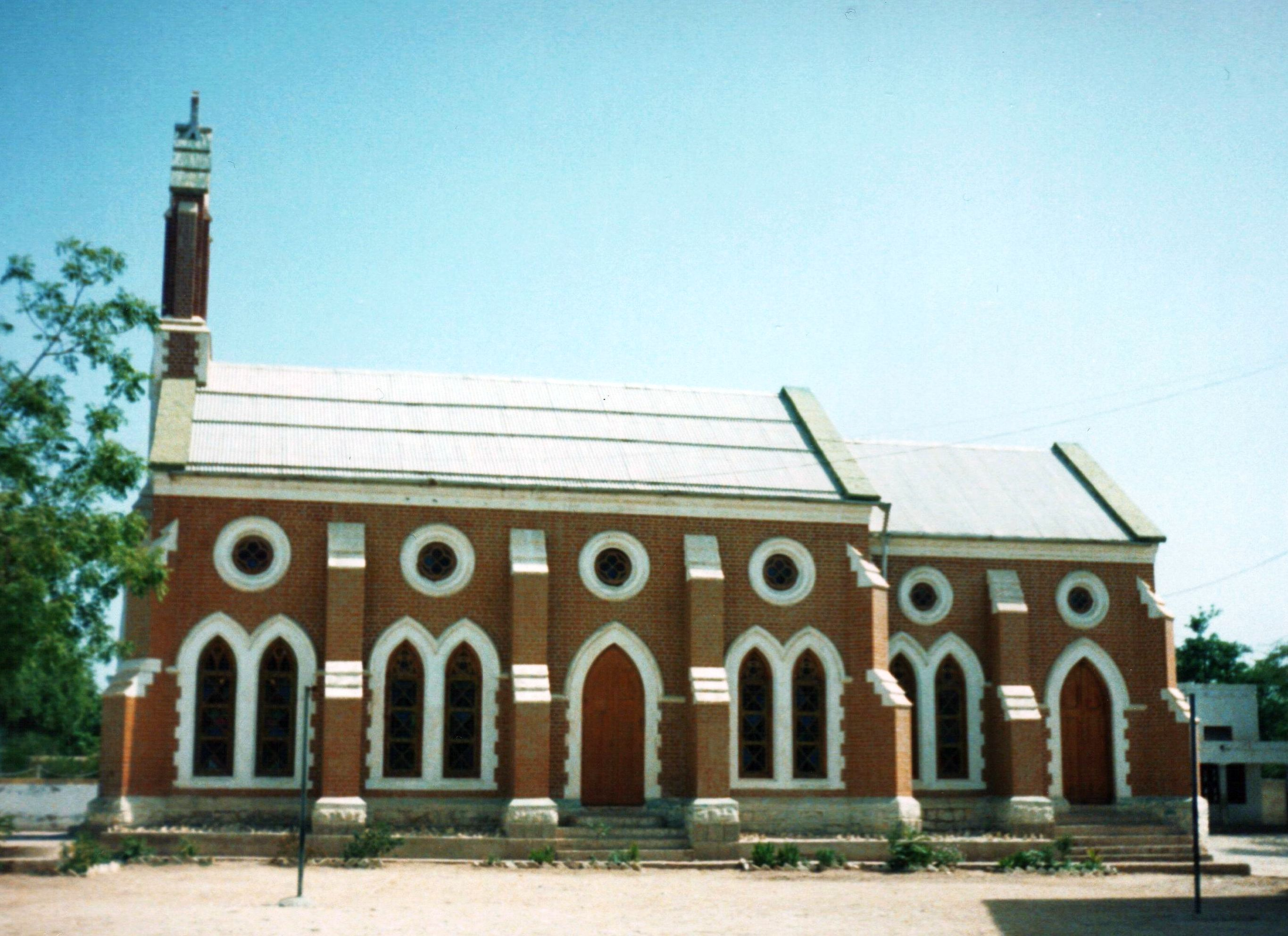
- St Mary's Church, Sukkur in 1992
- Location: Sukkur, Sindh
- Country: Pakistan
- Language: Urdu
- Denomination: Roman Catholic
- Tradition: Latin

Architecture
- Functional status: Active
- Groundbreaking: 1851
- Completed: 2009
- Demolished: February 2006

Administration
- Diocese: Diocese of Hyderabad

Clergy
- Bishop: Samson Shukardin OFM

St. Mary's Church, Sukkur, Pakistan, is part of the Roman Catholic Diocese of Hyderabad. It is one of the oldest parishes in the diocese, dating back to the 1850s. Fr. Konrad Peters SJ was the parish priest from 1851 to 1858.

Archbishop Lawrence Saldanha and Archbishop Simeon Anthony Pereira shared a close friendship while living in the parish.

The Catholic Justice and Peace Commission is keen to move beyond seminars and to improve women's lot, through participation in all spheres of life, social, economic, and political. At a one-day women's seminar on March 8, 1997, in St. Mary’s parish, measures were proposed to enhance women's participation in economic activity to empower them to take their fate into their own hands.

The parish also encompasses the St. Mary’s High School, Sukkur, the only Catholic high school in Sukkur, was established in 1881.

== Destruction and rebuilding ==
In February 2006, a mob destroyed St. Mary's Catholic Church and St. Savior's Protestant Church Similar attacks in other parts of the country have brought Muslim and minority religious leaders together. They have joined in condemning the string of attacks on churches in Pakistan and called for the government to change conditions that they say foster bigotry.

During the attack, the mob of several thousand arsonists ripped out and burnt pews and statues, and tried to force open the tabernacle, only for the handle to break off in their hands. The building was completely gutted by fire, leaving only the brick walls and no roof.

The bishop, Bishop Max Rodrigues, of Hyderabad, after waiting for government compensation, eventually turned to the aid organisation, Aid to the Church in Need. With the funds he raised and with the help of the local parishioners, the church was rebuilt and enlarged for a growing congregation. It reopened in 2009.
