= Church of the Virgin Mary, Focșani =

Heritage site in Vrancea County, Romania

Coordinates: 45°41′51″N 27°11′01″E

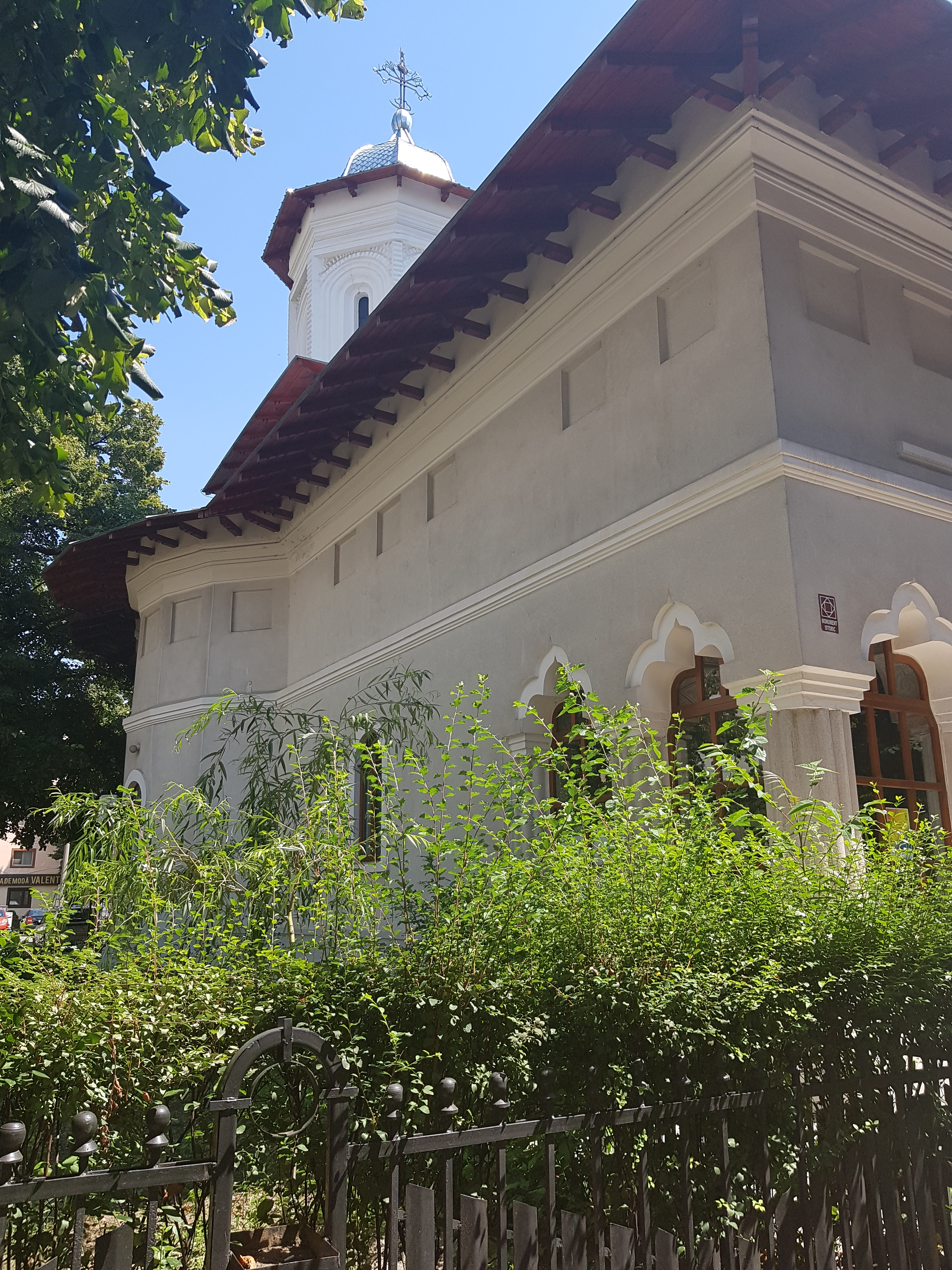
Church of the Virgin Mary

The Church of the Virgin Mary (Romanian: Biserica Adormirea Maicii Domnului - Precista) is a Romanian Orthodox church located at 42 Unirii Boulevard in Focșani, Romania. It is dedicated to the Dormition of the Theotokos.

The church was built in 1709–1716. It is listed as a historic monument by Romania's Ministry of Culture and Religious Affairs.
