= Saint Mary's Catholic Church, Bornova =

Catholic church in İzmir, Turkey

Saint Mary's Catholic Church
- Santa Maria Katolik Kilisesi
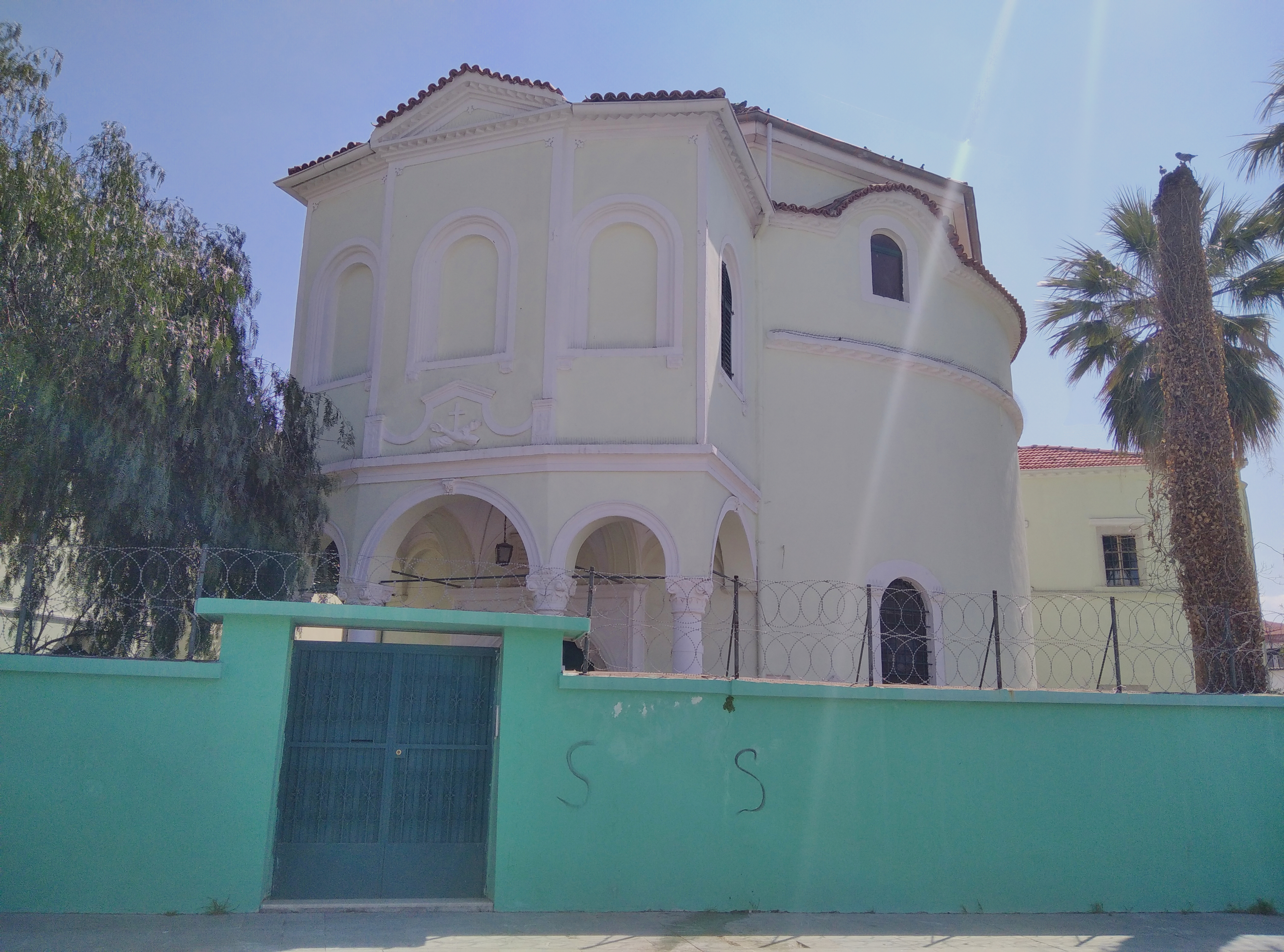

Religion
- Affiliation: Catholic Church

Location
- Location: Bornova, İzmir, Turkey
- Interactive map of Saint Mary's Catholic Church
- Coordinates: 38°27′57″N 27°13′12″E

Architecture
- Completed: 1831

Saint Mary's Catholic Church (Turkish: Santa Maria Katolik Kilisesi) is a Catholic church in Bornova district İzmir, Turkey.

== History ==
Saint Mary's Catholic Church was built by the Franciscans in 1831, according to the inscriptions in the church. During the creation of Bornova Cumhuriyet Square in the 1970s, the area of the church shrank with the construction of new buildings in the surrounding area. The church's immovables were transferred to the Italian Catholic Church by a court decision in 2018.
