= Church of St Mary and St Nicholas =

The Church of St Mary and St Nicholas and variations on this name may refer to:

== Churches in England ==
- St Mary and St Nicolas, Spalding, Lincolnshire
- Church of St Mary and St Nicholas, Littlemore, Oxfordshire
- Church of St Nicholas and the Blessed Virgin Mary, Stowey, Somerset
- Church of St Mary & St Nicholas, Leatherhead, Surrey
- Church of St Mary and St Nicholas, Wilton, Wiltshire

== Churches in Wales ==
- St Mary's and St Nicholas's Church, Beaumaris, Anglesey
