= Saint Mary's Catholic Church, Konak =

Church building in Konak, İzmir, Turkey

Saint Mary's Catholic Church
- Santa Maria Katolik Kilisesi
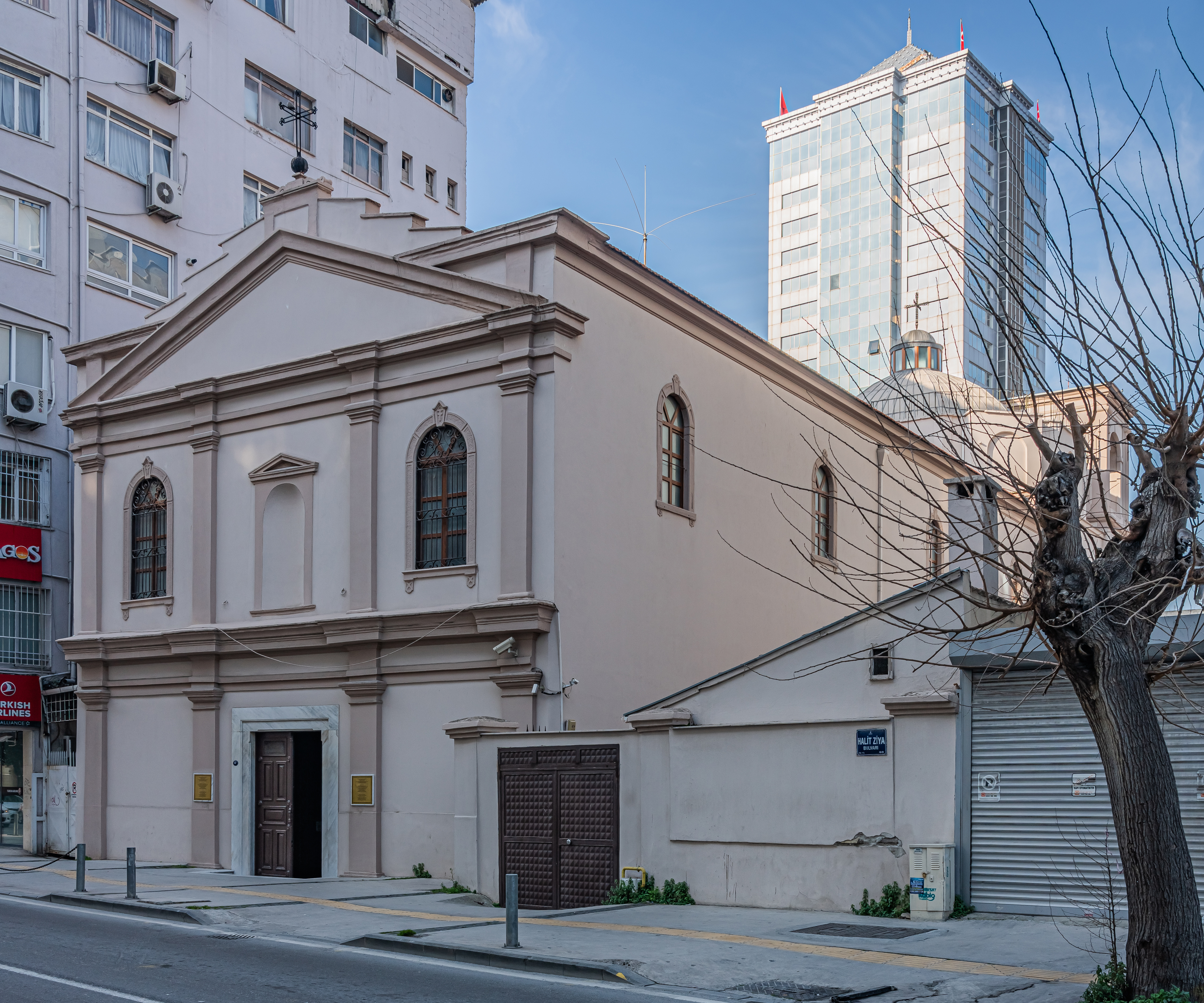

Religion
- Affiliation: Catholic Church
- Patron: Virgin Mary

Location
- Location: Konak, İzmir, Turkey
- Interactive map of Saint Mary's Catholic Church
- Coordinates: 38°25′35.6″N 27°08′05.7″E

Architecture
- Completed: 1698

Saint Mary's Catholic Church (Turkish: Santa Maria Katolik Kilisesi) is a Catholic church in İzmir, Turkey. It is located in the old Frankish neighborhood of the Konak district. The Church was built in honor of the Virgin Mary and opened in 1698. The church was made by the Franciscans who were settled in Izmir. Today it is used as an Italian Catholic Church with Franciscan priests serving a community of about 200 people.

== Architecture ==
The north, south and east facades of the church are quite simple in design, but the main facade and the interior space include finer, more ornate workmanship. Emulating antique age architecture, the iron ceiling and elaborate apse are noticeable within the interior of the church. The building was placed symmetrically and longitudinally in the east–west direction. It has a single-aisle basilica plan. It has tokens from the Renaissance and Baroque ages, which can be seen in the windows, columns and material that is used. There are many Corinthian columns in the church. The church has three doors: one main door and two side doors. The main door is opened only on ritual days.

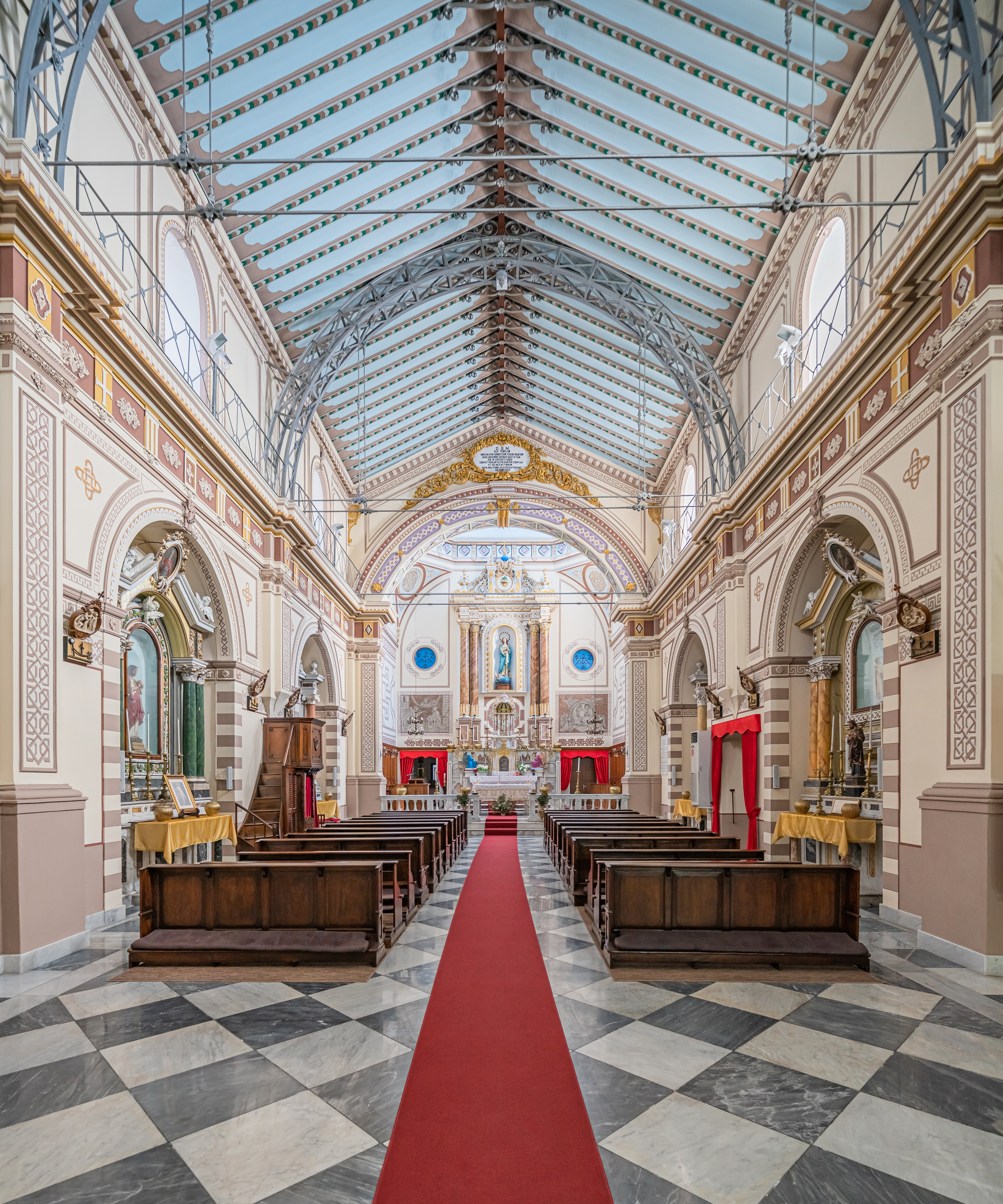
St. Mary's Catholic Church interior

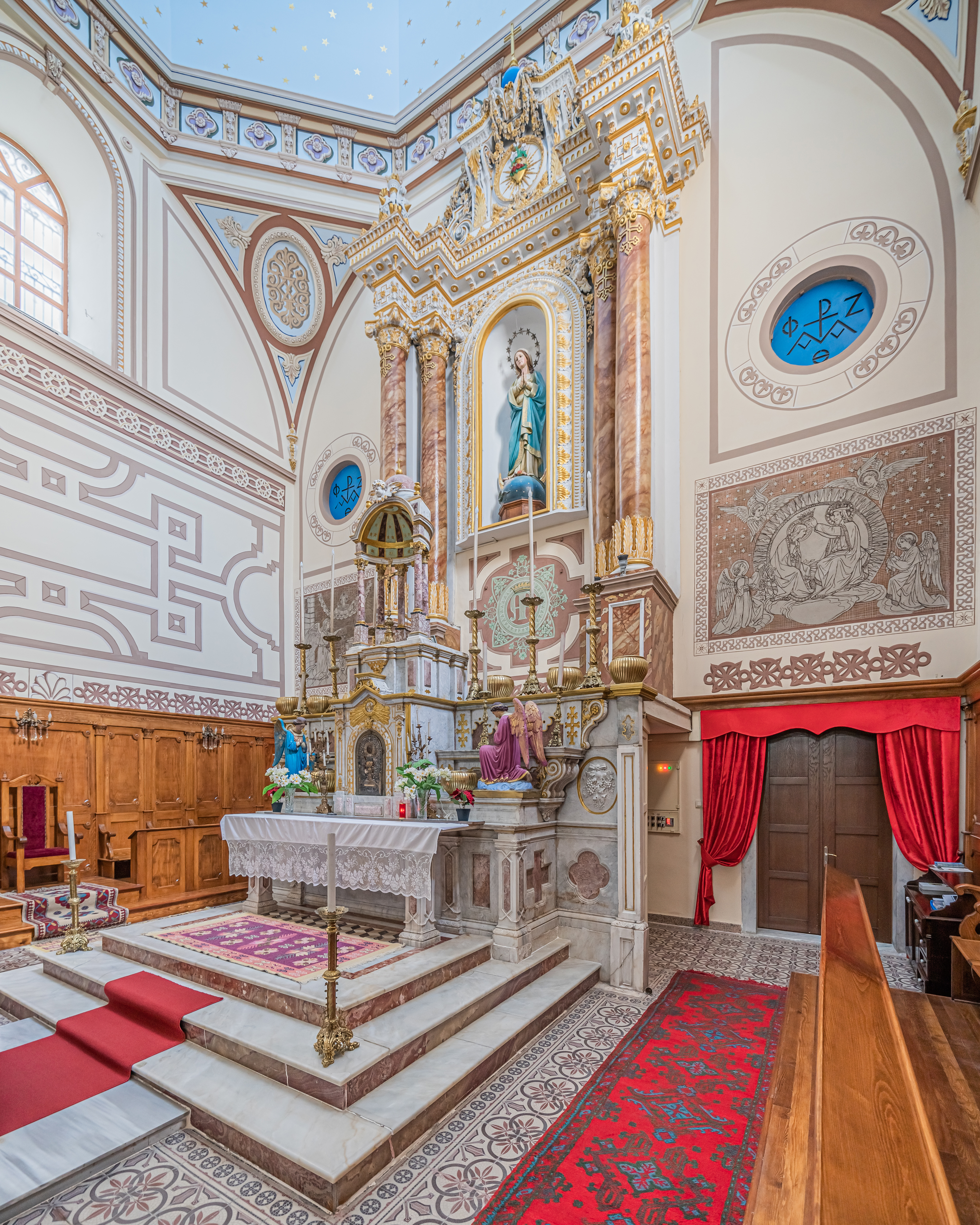
The altar

== See also ==
- Levantines (Latin Christians)
