= St. Mary's Church, Sønderborg =

Saint Mary's Church Sankt Marie Kirke
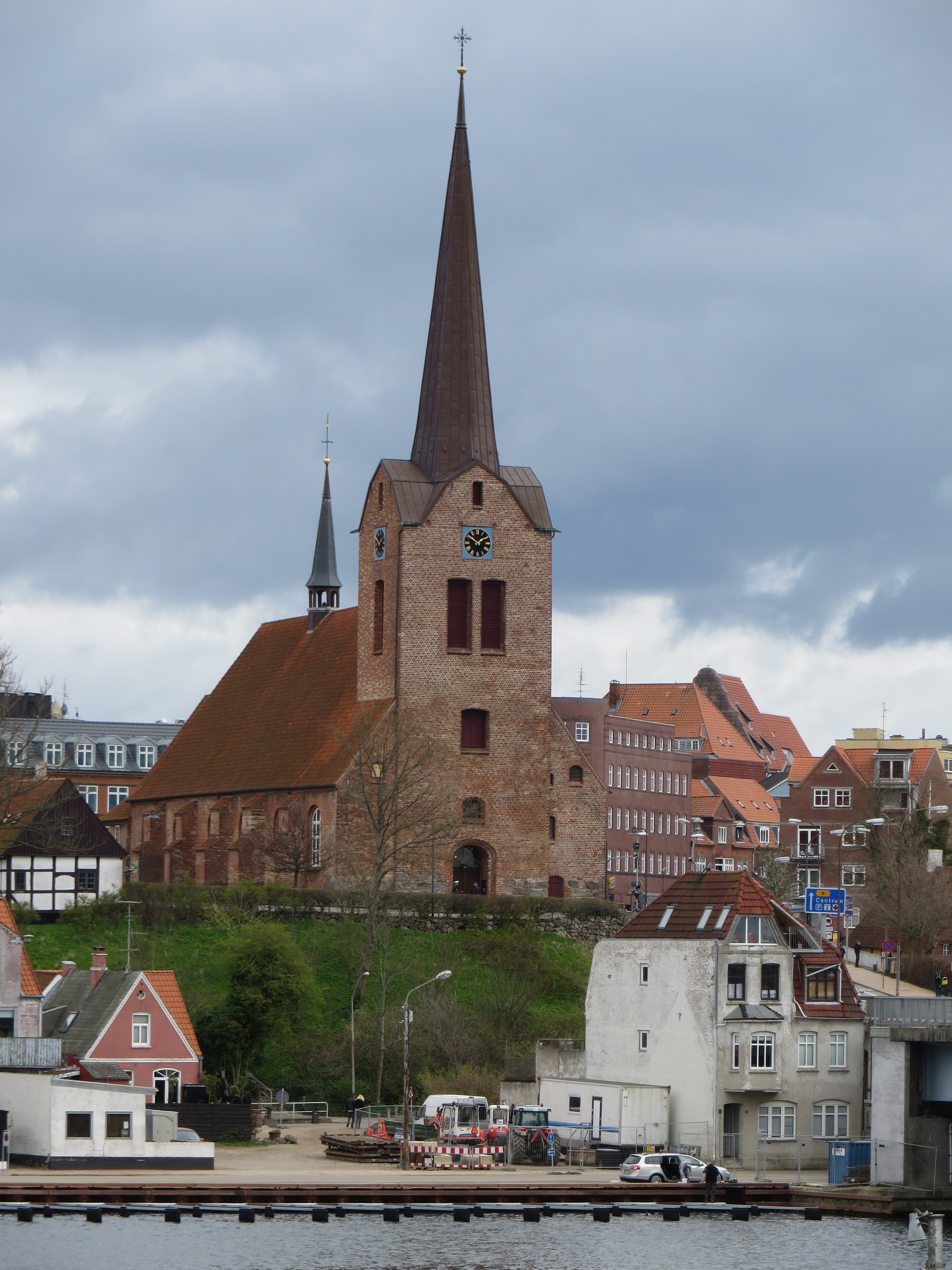
- Saint Mary's Church; Sankt Marie Kirke
- Location: Kirketorvet, 6400 Sønderborg
- Denomination: Lutheranism

Architecture
- Years built: 1595–1600

The St. Mary's Church is a church owned by the Church of Denmark in Sønderborg, Denmark and the church of the parish with the same name. Thanks to its location on a hill, the church building is very iconic for the city.

== History ==
In the Middle Ages there was a leper colony on a hill just outside the city. It was named after Saint George and around 1300 the chapel of this leper colony stood in the place of the present St. Mary's Church. After the old parish church of the city, the St. Nicholas Church, was demolished around 1530, the Saint-George chapel became the new main church. Towards the end of the 16th century, John II, Duke of Schleswig-Holstein-Sonderburg commissioned the enlargement of the building in order to make it suitable for the function of the parish church of his city.

== The current St. Mary's Church ==
In 1595 a start was made on the partial demolition of the old church and the construction of the new church. Only parts of the old medieval church remained. From the medieval church, a medieval wooden wall cupboard dating from about 1400 remained. The solemn inauguration of the new parish church took place just before Christmas in 1600. In 1649 the George Church was renamed as the Mary Church. The name of Saint George stayed in the Danish names Sankt Jørgensgade and Jørgensbjerg.
