= St Mary's Church, Williamstown =

St Mary's Catholic Church
- Church of St Mary of the Immaculate Conception
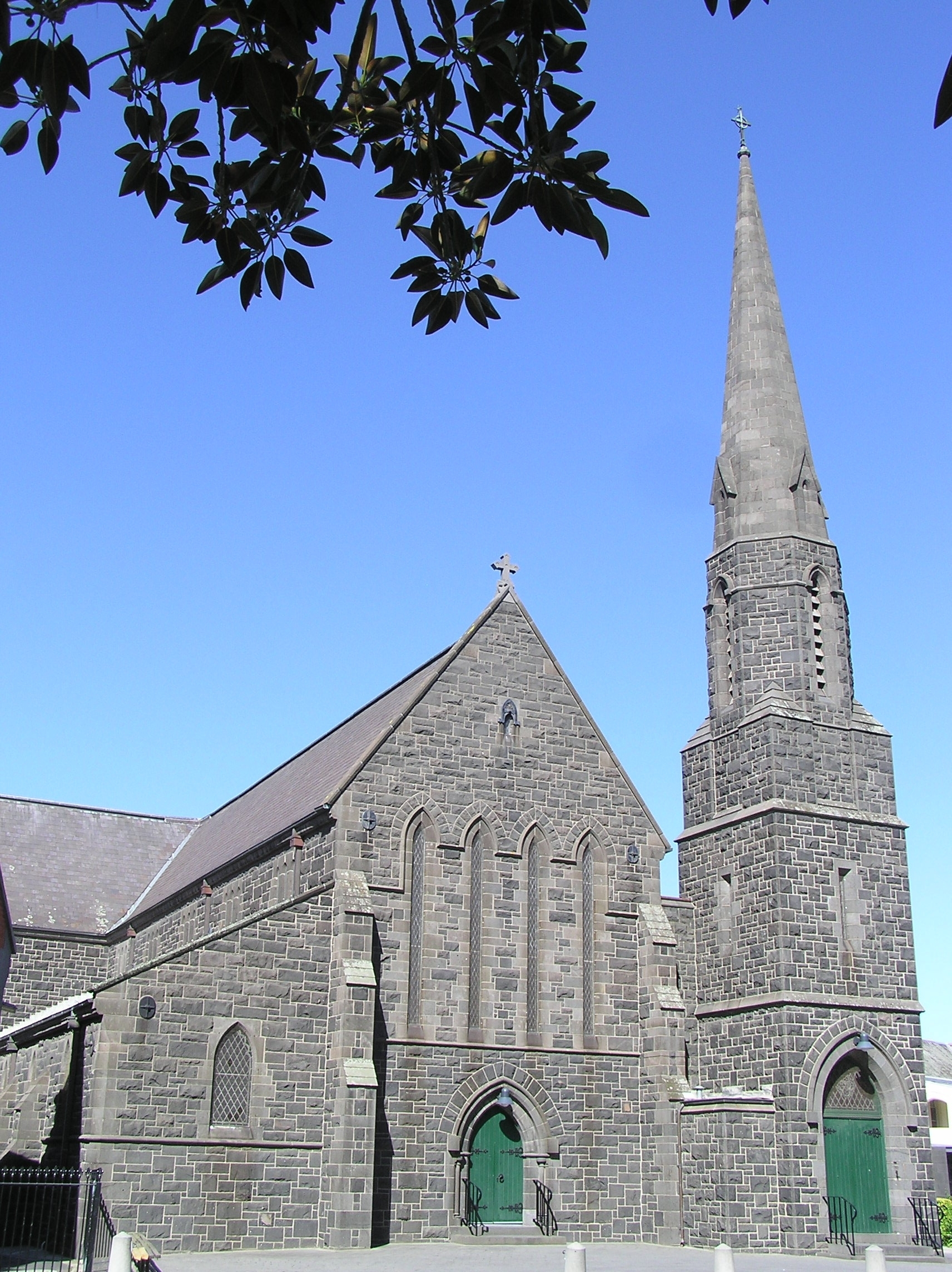
- St Mary's Catholic Church
- 37°51′50″S 144°54′04″E
- Address: 116 Cecil Street, Williamstown, Melbourne, Victoria
- Country: Australia
- Denomination: Roman Catholic
- Website: www.melbcatholic.org/s/williamstown

History
- Status: Church
- Dedication: Mary, mother of Jesus

Architecture
- Functional status: Active
- Architects: William Wardell; W. P. Connolly
- Architectural type: Church
- Style: Gothic Revival
- Years built: 1854 – 1933

Specifications
- Length: 18 metres (60 ft)
- Materials: Bluestone

Administration
- Archdiocese: Melbourne
- Parish: Williamstown

Clergy
- Priest: Greg Trythall

St Mary's Church, officially the Church of St Mary of the Immaculate Conception, is a Roman Catholic church located in Williamstown, Melbourne, Victoria, Australia.

== History ==
Originally constructed in the early 19th century, St Mary's was the second Catholic church to be constructed in the Port Phillip District of New South Wales (which would later become part of the colony of Victoria).

There have been a total of three structures located on the site, the first being a timber chapel, later being replaced by an earlier stone structure c. 1870. Later, a larger stone structure was built, which still stands on the site today, as designed by William Wardell, whose plans at one stage were lost.

Initially designed to incorporate a steeple, the plans were modified by the archdiocese at the time, allowing for the construction of St Patrick's Cathedral in Melbourne.

In 1933, the spire, transepts, sanctuary, side chapels and sacristy were added in accordance to the original design of W. P. Connolly.

== Gallery ==
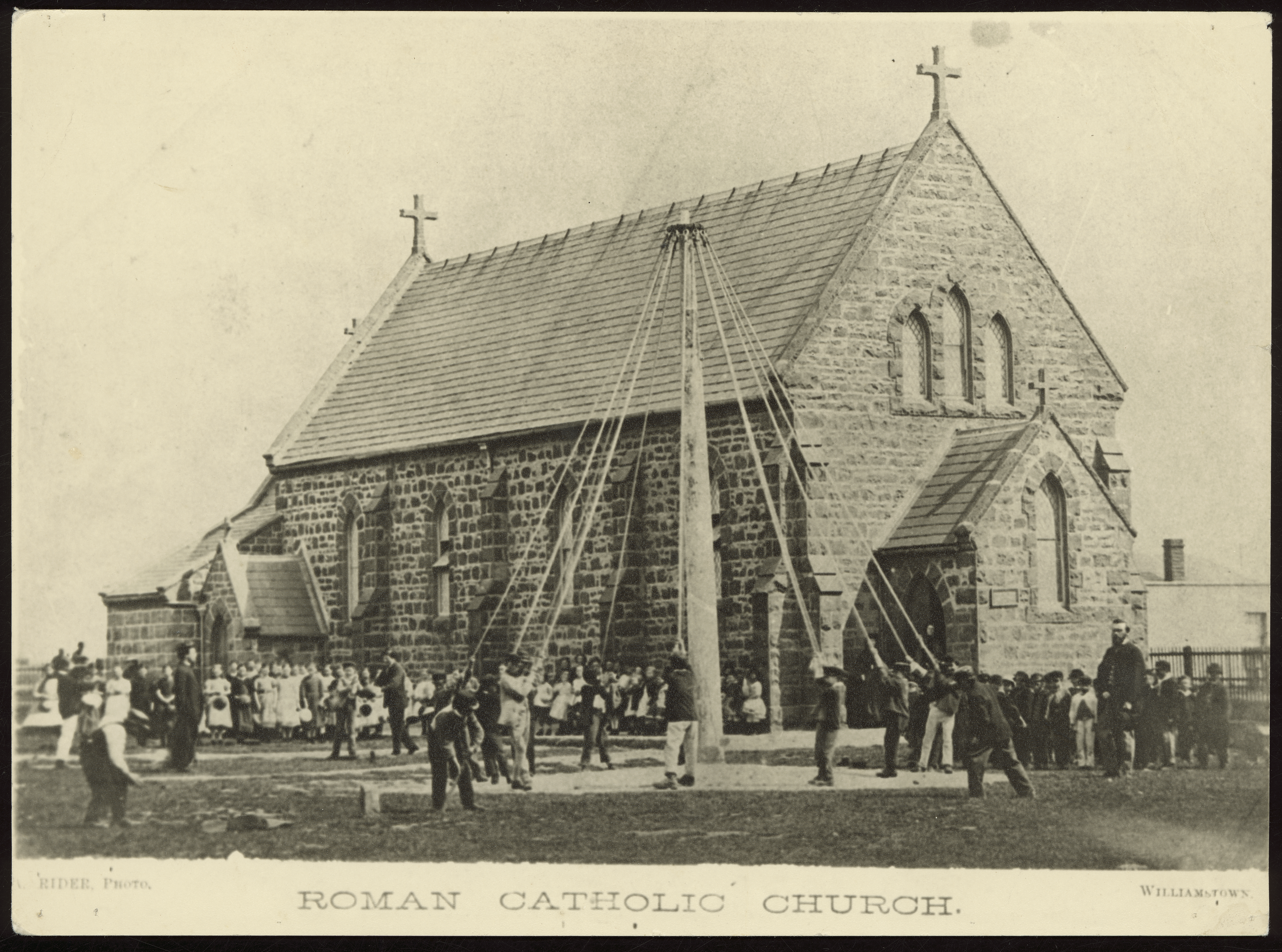
The second structure on the site of St Mary's Church. This was the first stone structure, which replaced the former timber chapel.

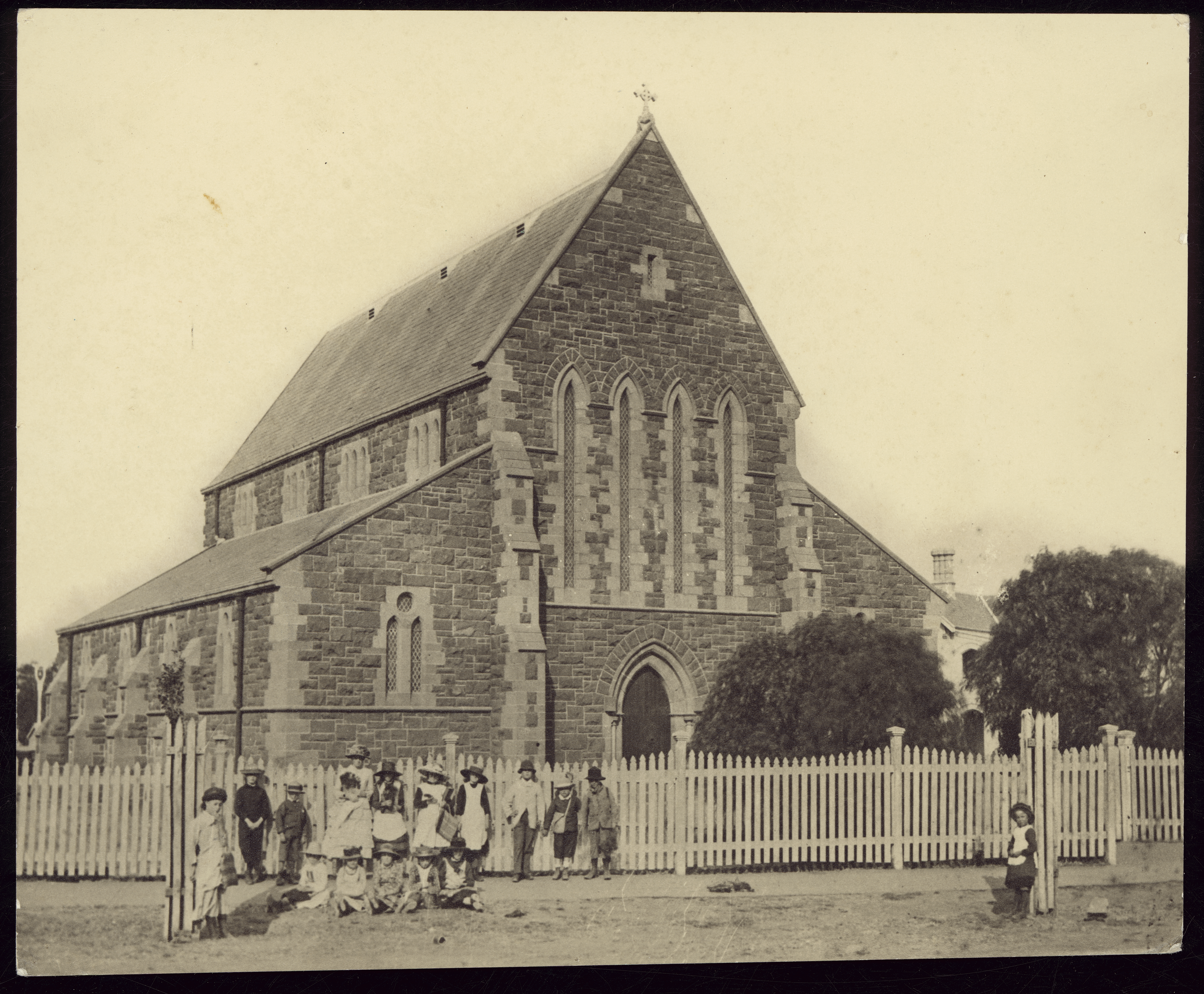
The third structure on the site of St Mary's Church. This shows the structure before later additions of the spire and other sections in 1933.
