= St. Mary's Church, Leusë =

18th-century church in Albania

St. Mary's Church
- Kisha e Shën Mërisë (Albanian)
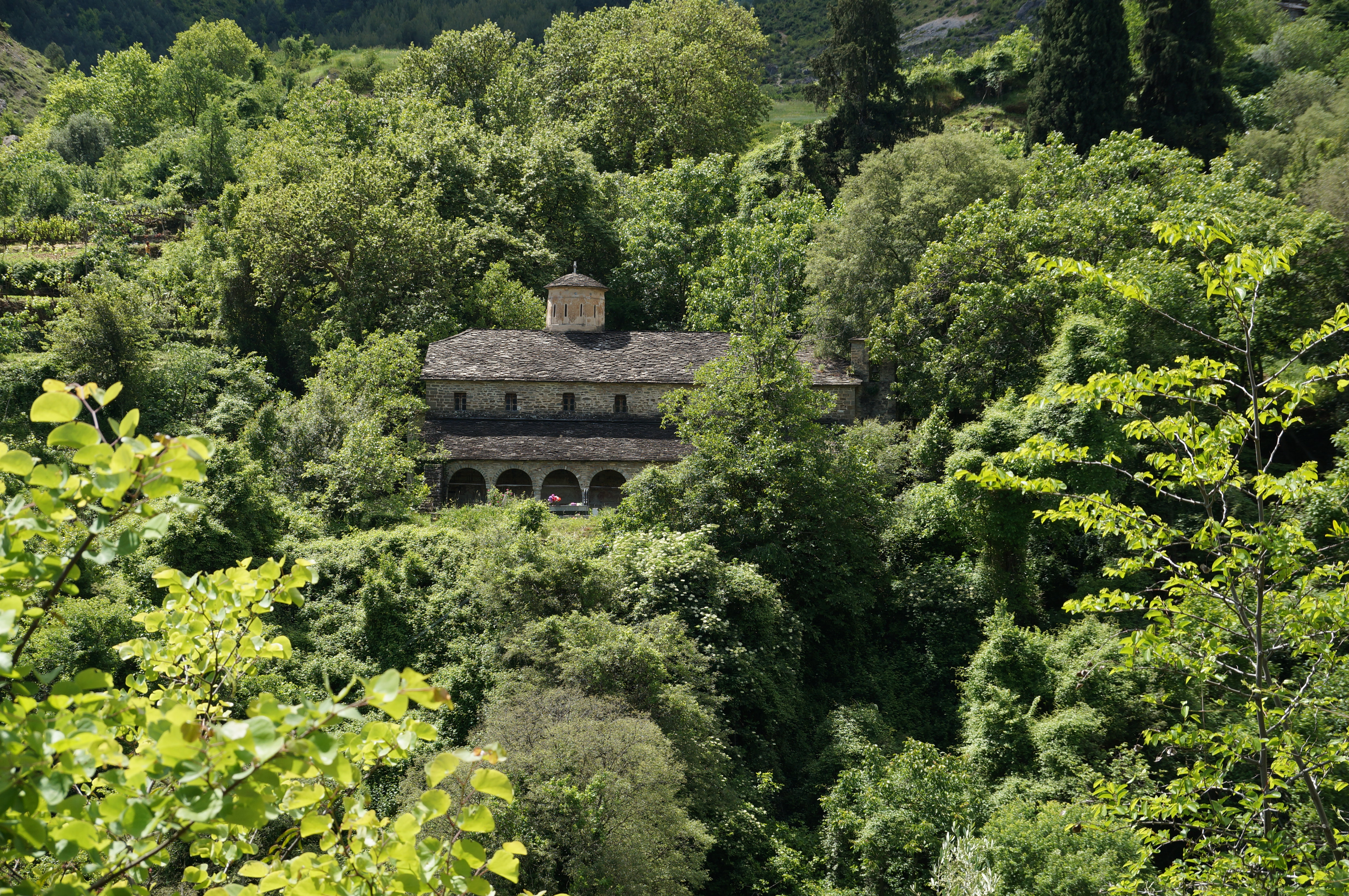

- Location within Albania
- 40°13′11″N 20°21′26″E
- Location: Leusë, Përmet, Gjirokastër County, Albania

History
- Built: 6th century
- Rebuilt: 18th century

Site notes
- Governing body: DRKK Gjirokastër

St. Mary's Church is a cultural heritage monument in Leusë, Përmet, near Gjirokastër, Albania.

== History and description ==
The current church was built in the 18th century over the remains of an older structure dating to the reign of Byzantine Emperor Justinian I.
