= Blessed Virgin Mary Church, Pińczów =

Church in Pińczów, Poland

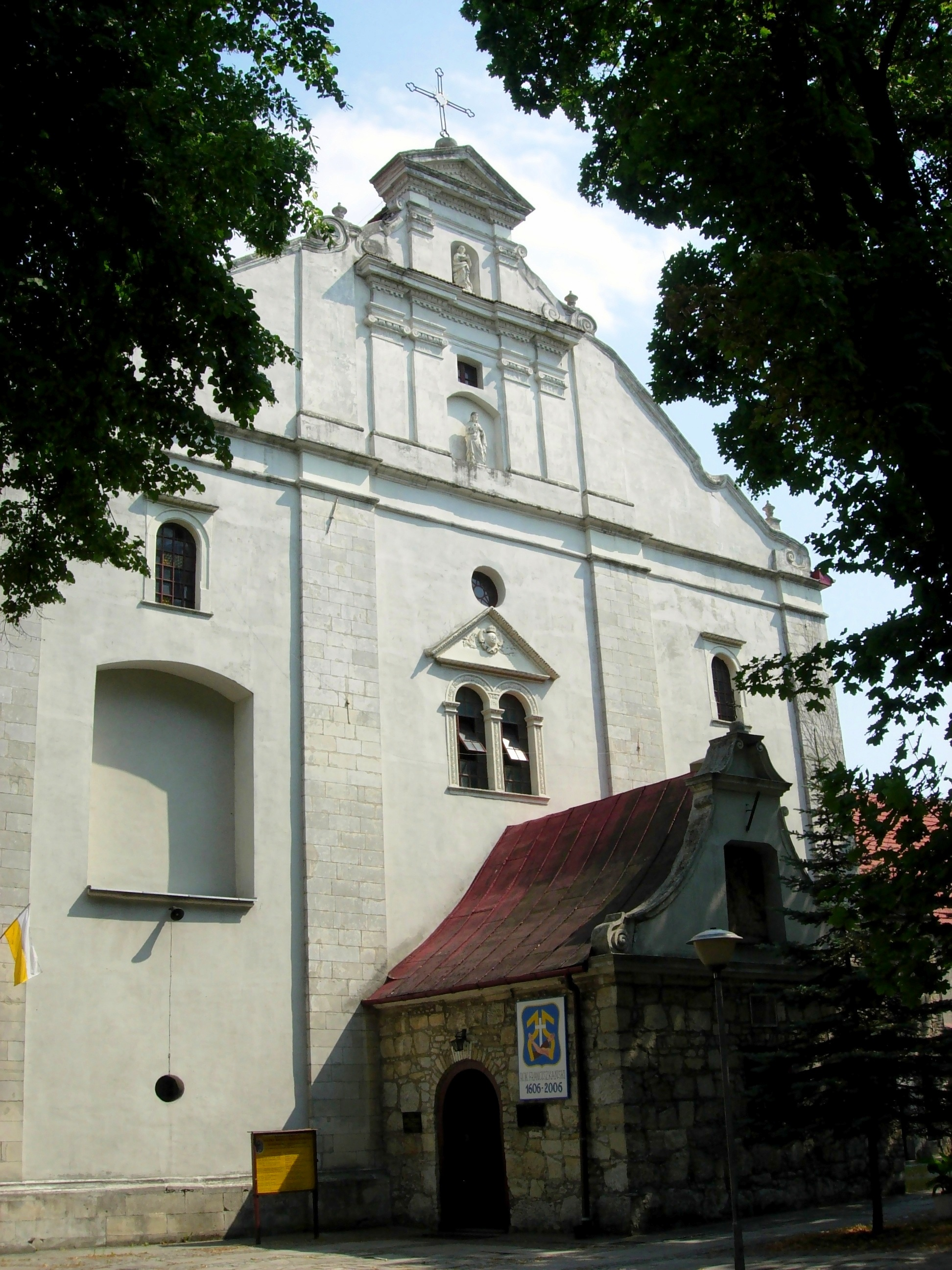
The church from the front

Blessed Virgin Mary Church (Polish: Kościół klasztorny pw. Nawiedzenia Najświętszej Maryi Panny) is a church in Pińczów in Poland (Mirów quarter).

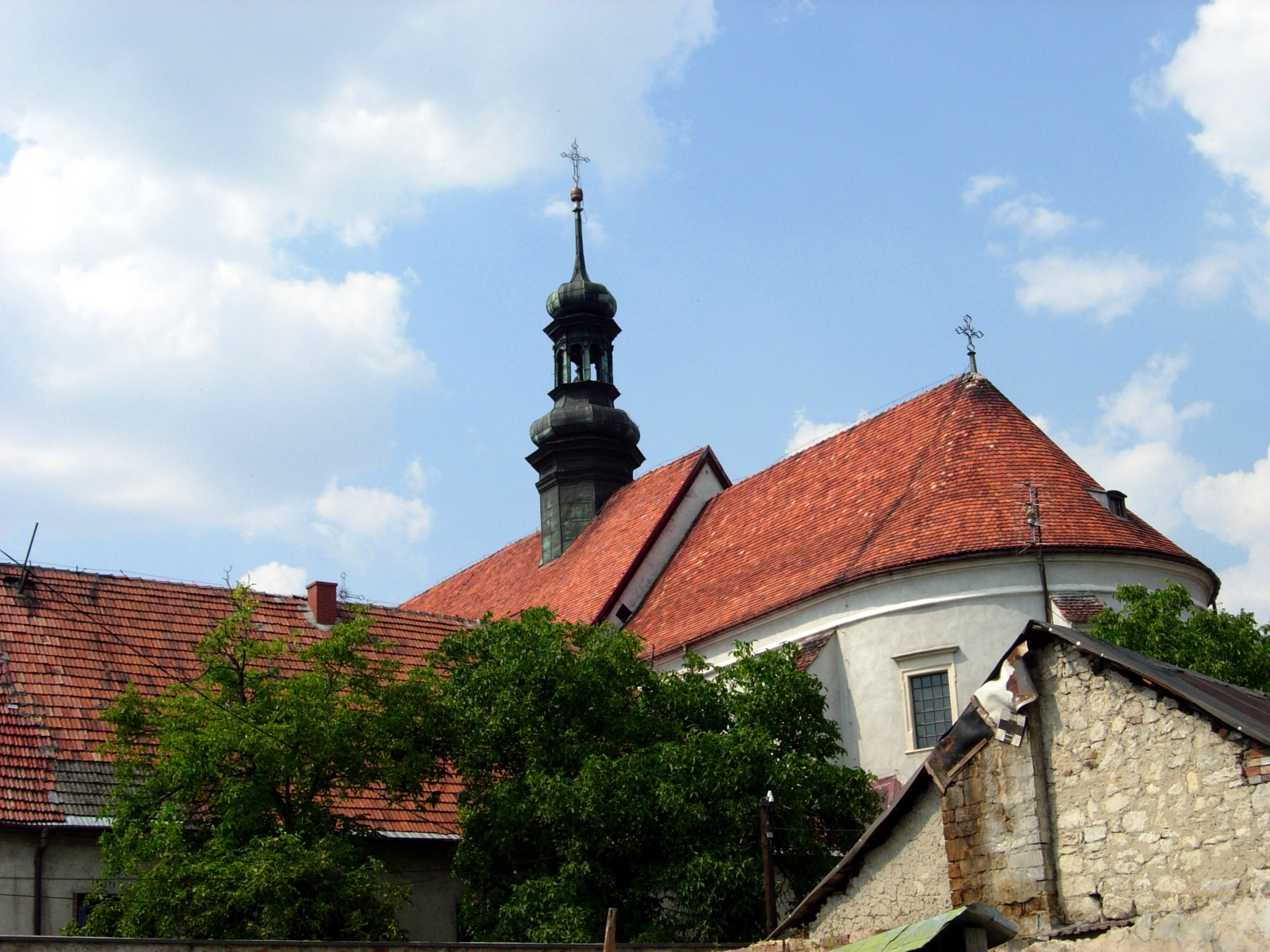
The church's apse

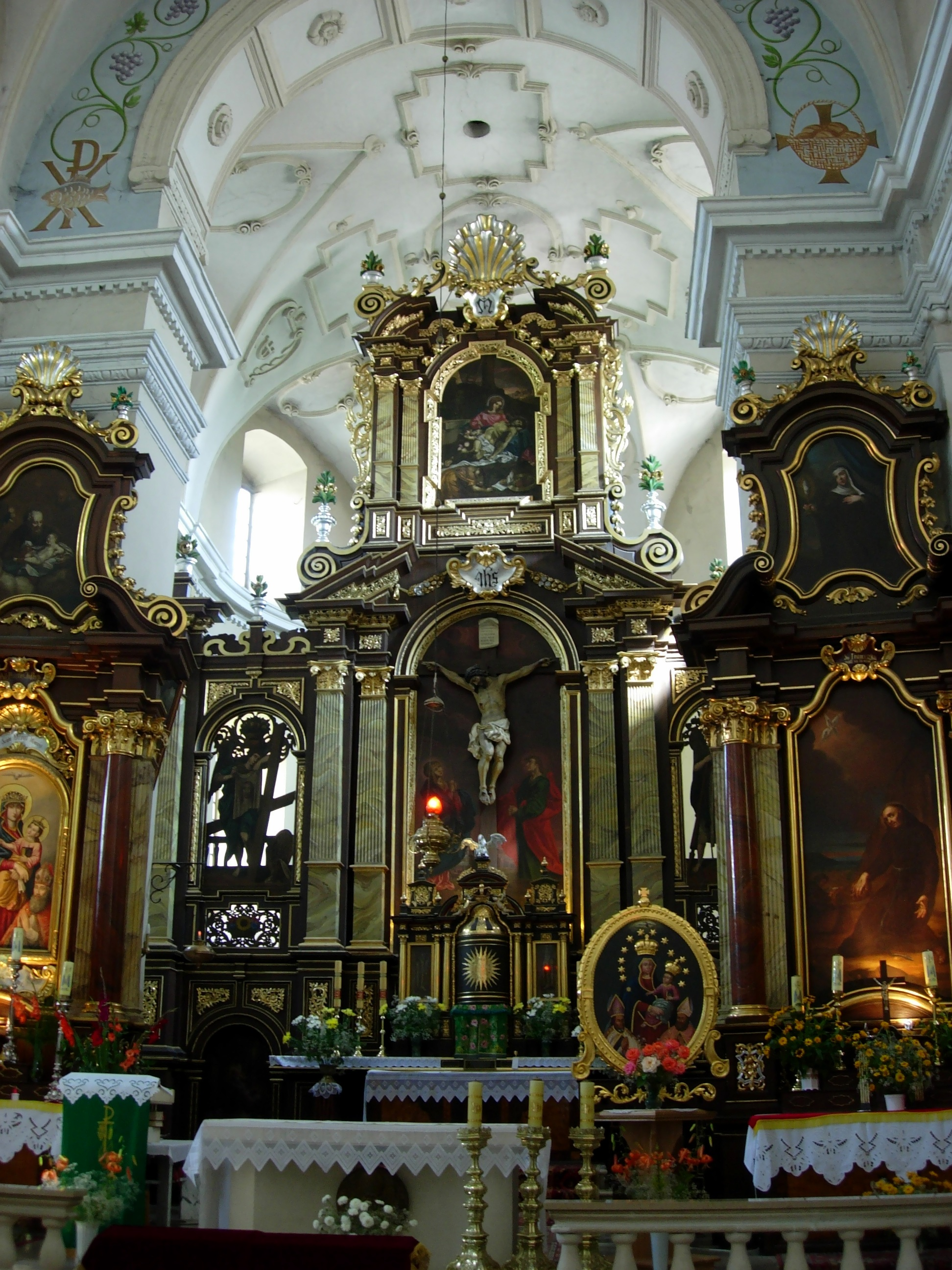
The altar of the church
