= St. Mary's Catholic Church (Nebraska City, Nebraska) =

Church building in the United States

Coordinates: 40°40′40″N 95°51′08″W

St. Mary's Catholic Church is a parish of the Catholic Church in Nebraska City, Nebraska, part of the Diocese of Lincoln. It is the mother church of Lourdes Central Catholic Schools in Nebraska City. Its parish church is located at 218 North 6th Street in Nebraska City.

The parish was established in 1869 to serve the English-speaking faithful as the older parish in Nebraska City, St. Benedict's, only offered services in German. Fr. John McGoldrich was appointed its first pastor immediately after his ordination in 1870. In the 1880s, the parish purchased a brick church at the corner of Sixth and Laramie Streets at auction, which was remodeled and renovated for its own use.

The parish was staffed by the Precious Blood Fathers from 1910 to 1983. During this time, the current Romanesque church and rectory were built at the corner of First Avenue and Sixth Street, dedicated by Bishop Kucera on July 12, 1942.
