= St. Mary of the Assumption Church (Avilla, Indiana) =

Church building in Avilla, IN, USA

Coordinates: 41.369240°N 85.238860°W

St. Mary of the Assumption Catholic Church is a Roman Catholic parish in Avilla, Indiana. It is located in the Roman Catholic Diocese of Fort Wayne-South Bend. Its current parish church was dedicated in 1878.

The parish supports its own parochial school and a small convent for its Franciscan Sisters of the Sacred Heart. St. Mary's was also the site of the first motherhouse in America for the Franciscan sisters.
