= Grade I listed buildings in Mid Suffolk =

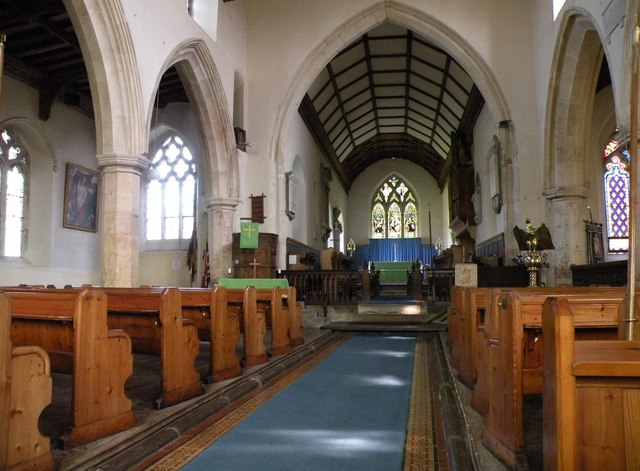
The interior of St Mary's in Coddenham.

There are many Grade I listed buildings in Mid Suffolk, a non-metropolitan district of in the county of Suffolk in England.

In the United Kingdom, the term listed building refers to a building or other structure officially designated as being of "exceptional architectural or historic special interest"; Grade I structures are those considered to be "buildings of "exceptional interest, sometimes considered to be internationally important. Just 2.5% of listed buildings are Grade I." The total number of listed buildings in England is 372,905. Listing was begun by a provision in the Town and Country Planning Act 1947. Listing a building imposes severe restrictions on what the owner might wish to change or modify in the structure or its fittings. In England, the authority for listing under the Planning (Listed Buildings and Conservation Areas) Act 1990 rests with English Heritage, a non-departmental public body sponsored by the Department for Culture, Media and Sport.

Mid Suffolk is a local government district with its administrative headquarters formerly at Needham Market, now in Ipswich, outside the district, while the main town in the district is Stowmarket. The other town in the area is Eye. The number of inhabitants of the area is 93,800 with a density of 108 inhabitants per km^{2}. The whole district is parished and divided among 122 civil parishes.

The district contains the highest amount of listed buildings in Suffolk, which are 4,062; it should be also mentioned that the area has 21 scheduled monuments and 31 conservation areas.

== Mid Suffolk ==
Name	Location	Type	Completed (Note: The date given is the date used by Historic England as significant for the initial building or that of an important part in the structure's description.)	Date designated	Grid ref. (Note: The grid reference is based on the British national grid reference system, sometimes known as OSGB36, used by the Ordnance Survey.) Geo-coordinates	Entry number (Note: The "List Entry Number" is a unique number assigned to each listed building and scheduled monument by Historic England.)	Image	Ref.
Church of All Saints	Ashbocking, Mid Suffolk	Parish Church	Medieval	9 December 1955	TM1695654509; 52°08′46″N 1°10′10″E	1352127	Church of All Saints More images	
Church of St Mary	Bacton	Parish Church	c. 1300	29 July 1955	TM0531867199; 52°15′53″N 1°00′27″E	1032755	Church of St Mary More images	
Church of St Mary	Badley	Parish Church	14th century	9 December 1955	TM0623855918; 52°09′47″N 1°00′50″E	1231082	Church of St Mary More images	
Church of St Mary	Badwell Ash	Parish Church	14th century	15 November 1954	TL9896068980; 52°16′59″N 0°54′55″E	1032210	Church of St Mary More images	
Church of St Mary	Barham	Parish Church	Late 13th century	9 December 1955	TM1367950950; 52°06′56″N 1°07′10″E	1033288	Church of St Mary More images	
Church of St Mary	Barking	Parish Church	14th century	9 December 1955	TM0764353565; 52°08′29″N 1°01′59″E	1231756	Church of St Mary More images	
Church of St Mary	Battisford	Parish Church	Medieval	9 December 1955	TM0549454373; 52°08′58″N 1°00′08″E	1033018	Church of St Mary More images	
Church of St Nicholas	Bedfield	Parish Church	Medieval	29 July 1955	TM2271366347; 52°15′01″N 1°15′41″E	1032340	Church of St Nicholas More images	
Church of St Mary	Bedingfield	Parish Church	Probably 13th century	29 July 1955	TM1798868792; 52°16′27″N 1°11′38″E	1213550	Church of St Mary More images	
Church of St Mary the Virgin	Bramford	Parish Church	Medieval-up to Mid 14th century	9 December 1955	TM1273146306; 52°04′27″N 1°06′10″E	1208235	Church of St Mary the Virgin More images	
Church of St Lawrence	Brundish	Parish Church	Medieval	29 July 1955	TM2714769546; 52°16′38″N 1°19′42″E	1352203	Church of St Lawrence More images	
The Woodlands	Brundish	Farmhouse	Mid-late 13th century	18 December 1987	TM2505369219; 52°16′30″N 1°17′51″E	1352226	The Woodlands More images	
Church of St Mary	Buxhall	Parish Church	Mid 14th century	9 December 1955	TM0030557653; 52°10′51″N 0°55′42″E	1033025	Church of St Mary More images	
Church of St Peter	Claydon	Parish Church	C10/C11	9 December 1955	TM1372949846; 52°06′20″N 1°07′10″E	1250925	Church of St Peter More images	
Choppins Hill House	Coddenham	House	c. 1600	9 December 1955	TM1376255423; 52°09′20″N 1°07′25″E	1352044	Upload Photo	
Church of St Mary	Coddenham	Parish Church	11th century or 12th century	9 December 1955	TM1327254160; 52°08′40″N 1°06′56″E	1033267	Church of St Mary More images	
Church of St Mary	Combs	Parish Church	15th century	9 December 1955	TM0511556919; 52°10′21″N 0°59′53″E	1033001	Church of St Mary More images	
Church of St Andrew	Cotton	Church	1890	29 July 1955	TM0700866923; 52°15′41″N 1°01′55″E	1352478	Church of St Andrew More images	
Church of St Peter	Creeting St Peter	Parish Church	Norman	9 December 1955	TM0807657696; 52°10′42″N 1°02′31″E	1352072	Church of St Peter More images	
Church of St Mary	Debenham	Church	15th century	9 December 1955	TM1744563208; 52°13′27″N 1°10′56″E	1283304	Church of St Mary More images	
Drinkstone Post Mill	Drinkstone	Post Mill	16th century	15 November 1954	TL9641862202; 52°13′23″N 0°52′27″E	1032625	Drinkstone Post Mill More images	
Church of St Peter and St Paul	Eye	Church	14th century	15 June 1951	TM1489073797; 52°19′13″N 1°09′06″E	1316617	Church of St Peter and St Paul More images	
Eye Castle	Eye	House	11th century	15 June 1951	TM1478673783; 52°19′12″N 1°09′00″E	1316598	Eye Castle More images	
The Guildhall	Eye	Guildhall	15th century	15 June 1951	TM1486573817; 52°19′13″N 1°09′05″E	1316621	The Guildhall More images	
Church of St Bartholomew	Finningham	Parish Church	14th century	29 July 1955	TM0664969396; 52°17′02″N 1°01′42″E	1352056	Church of St Bartholomew More images	
Church of St Mary	Flowton	Church	Early 14th century	9 December 1955	TM0819546856; 52°04′51″N 1°02′13″E	1251233	Church of St Mary More images	
Church of St Mary	Framsden	Parish Church	15th century	9 December 1955	TM2007759734; 52°11′31″N 1°13′06″E	1033063	Church of St Mary More images	
Framsden Hall	Framsden	House	c. 1617	9 December 1955	TM2054660066; 52°11′41″N 1°13′32″E	1033094	Upload Photo	
Church of St Peter and St Paul	Fressingfield	Parish Church	15th century	29 July 1955	TM2615577483; 52°20′55″N 1°19′09″E	1181830	Church of St Peter and St Paul More images	
Stable 80 Metres North of Church Farmhouse	Fressingfield	Stable	16th century	29 July 1955	TM2605777600; 52°20′59″N 1°19′04″E	1181804	Upload Photo	
Church of St Mary	Gedding	Parish Church	14th century	15 November 1954	TL9519258126; 52°11′13″N 0°51′14″E	1032594	Church of St Mary More images	
Chapel of St Nicholas	Gipping	Nonconformist Chapel	1480	9 December 1955	TM0720463578; 52°13′53″N 1°01′58″E	1352278	Chapel of St Nicholas More images	
Church of St Mary	Gislingham	Church	15th century	29 July 1955	TM0763471794; 52°18′18″N 1°02′39″E	1033123	Church of St Mary More images	
Church of All Saints	Great Ashfield	Parish Church	Medieval	15 November 1954	TL9955867787; 52°16′19″N 0°55′24″E	1182120	Church of All Saints More images	
Church of St Mary	Great Blakenham	Parish Church	14th century	9 December 1955	TM1180850827; 52°06′55″N 1°05′32″E	1251271	Church of St Mary More images	
Church of St Mary and St Laurence	Great Bricett	Parish Church	Medieval	9 December 1955	TM0386550677; 52°07′01″N 0°58′34″E	1352160	Church of St Mary and St Laurence More images	
Great Bricett Hall	Great Bricett	Aisled House	Mid 13th century	9 December 1955	TM0384450681; 52°07′01″N 0°58′33″E	1032976	Great Bricett Hall More images	
Church of St Augustine	Harleston	Parish Church	13th century	9 December 1955	TM0185660373; 52°12′17″N 0°57′10″E	1032731	Church of St Augustine More images	
Church of St Mary the Virgin	Haughley	Parish Church	14th century	9 December 1955	TM0261262307; 52°13′18″N 0°57′53″E	1352304	Church of St Mary the Virgin More images	
Haughley Park and Attached Garden Walls on Three Sides	Haughley	House	c. 1620	9 December 1955	TM0044161905; 52°13′08″N 0°55′58″E	1181268	Haughley Park and Attached Garden Walls on Three Sides More images	
Church of St Mary	Helmingham	Parish Church	Medieval	9 December 1955	TM1907457635; 52°10′24″N 1°12′09″E	1033077	Church of St Mary More images	
Helmingham Hall	Helmingham	House	16th century	9 December 1955	TM1865657685; 52°10′27″N 1°11′47″E	1033070	Helmingham Hall More images	
Church of St Gregory	Hemingstone	Parish Church	Medieval	9 December 1955	TM1446653646; 52°08′22″N 1°07′58″E	1182641	Church of St Gregory More images	
Hemingstone Hall and Attached Garden Walls on the South West Side	Hemingstone	House	1625	9 December 1955	TM1392853723; 52°08′25″N 1°07′29″E	1182536	Hemingstone Hall and Attached Garden Walls on the South West Side More images	
Church of St Peter	Henley	Village Hall	c. 1860	9 December 1955	TM1586251333; 52°07′05″N 1°09′06″E	1250935	Church of St Peter More images	
Church of St Ethelbert	Hessett	Parish Church	15th century	15 November 1954	TL9369061840; 52°13′15″N 0°50′03″E	1352400	Church of St Ethelbert More images	
Church of Ss Peter and Paul	Hoxne	Parish Church	15th century	29 July 1955	TM1813977507; 52°21′08″N 1°12′06″E	1032509	Church of Ss Peter and Paul More images	
Church of All Saints'	Laxfield	Parish Church	15th century	29 July 1955	TM2961772444; 52°18′08″N 1°21′59″E	1180967	Church of All Saints' More images	
Church of St Mary	Little Blakenham	Parish Church	15th century	9 December 1955	TM1049248858; 52°05′53″N 1°04′18″E	1251408	Church of St Mary More images	
Church of All Saints	Withersdale	Parish Church	14th century	29 July 1955	TM2696382942; 52°23′51″N 1°20′05″E	1284675	Church of All Saints More images	
Church of St Mary Magdalen	Withersdale	Parish Church	14th century	29 July 1955	TM2837380773; 52°22′38″N 1°21′14″E	1032948	Church of St Mary Magdalen More images	
Church of St Mary	Mendlesham	Church	15th century	29 July 1955	TM1056065790; 52°15′00″N 1°05′00″E	1032241	Church of St Mary More images	
Church of St John the Baptist	Metfield	Parish Church	15th century	29 July 1955	TM2943080325; 52°22′22″N 1°22′09″E	1182343	Church of St John the Baptist More images	
Church of St Andrew	Mickfield	Parish Church	14th century	9 December 1955	TM1347861732; 52°12′45″N 1°07′24″E	1183171	Church of St Andrew More images	
Church of St Peter	Monk Soham	Parish Church	14th century	29 July 1955	TM2136265083; 52°14′22″N 1°14′27″E	1032265	Church of St Peter More images	
Church of St John the Baptist	Needham Market	Chapel of Ease	c1470-c1500	9 December 1955	TM0877555177; 52°09′19″N 1°03′02″E	1254254	Church of St John the Baptist More images	
Church of St Mary	Nettlestead	Parish Church	c.1500	9 December 1955	TM0885349426; 52°06′13″N 1°02′53″E	1263028	Church of St Mary More images	
Church of St Mary	Offton	Parish Church	15th century	9 December 1955	TM0661349637; 52°06′23″N 1°00′56″E	1263030	Church of St Mary More images	
Church of St Mary	Old Newton	Parish Church	14th century	9 December 1955	TM0597562455; 52°13′18″N 1°00′51″E	1181693	Church of St Mary More images	
Church of St. Peter	Palgrave	Parish Church	15th century	29 July 1955	TM1156278465; 52°21′48″N 1°06′21″E	1032776	Church of St. Peter More images	
Church of St Nicholas	Rattlesden	Parish Church	14th century	15 November 1954	TL9780559049; 52°11′39″N 0°53′34″E	1181243	Church of St Nicholas More images	
Church of St Mary, Bury Road	Rickinghall Inferior	Parish Church	14th century	15 November 1954	TM0387775126; 52°20′11″N 0°59′28″E	1097030	Church of St Mary, Bury Road More images	
Church of St Mary, Candle Street	Rickinghall Superior	Parish Church	Mid-Late 14th century	29 July 1955	TM0408974589; 52°19′53″N 0°59′38″E	1241122	Church of St Mary, Candle Street More images	
Church of St Catherine	Ringshall	Parish Church	16th century	9 December 1955	TM0428952894; 52°08′12″N 0°59′01″E	1283864	Church of St Catherine More images	
Church of St Mary	Somersham	Parish Church	14th century	9 December 1955	TM0910248457; 52°05′42″N 1°03′04″E	1251599	Church of St Mary More images	
Church of the Blessed Virgin Mary and St Lambert	Stonham Aspal	Parish Church	Medieval	9 December 1955	TM1334559523; 52°11′34″N 1°07′12″E	1033180	Church of the Blessed Virgin Mary and St Lambert More images	
Church of St Mary the Virgin	Earl Stonham	Parish Church	16th century	9 December 1955	TM1077958839; 52°11′15″N 1°04′55″E	1033223	Church of St Mary the Virgin More images	
Church of St Mary the Virgin	Little Stonham	Parish Church	16th century	9 December 1955	TM1116760148; 52°11′57″N 1°05′19″E	1352062	Church of St Mary the Virgin More images	
Church of St George	Stowlangtoft	Parish Church	c1370 - 1390	15 November 1954	TL9578268202; 52°16′38″N 0°52′06″E	1182897	Church of St George More images	
Church of St Peter and St Mary	Stowmarket	Parish Church	Mid 14th century	28 July 1950	TM0492058680; 52°11′18″N 0°59′47″E	1208624	Church of St Peter and St Mary More images	
Church of St Ethelbert	Tannington	Parish Church	15th century	29 July 1955	TM2423967492; 52°15′35″N 1°17′04″E	1032386	Church of St Ethelbert More images	
Church of St Mary	Thornham Parva	Parish Church	14th century	29 July 1955	TM1090872644; 52°18′41″N 1°05′33″E	1285113	Church of St Mary More images	
Church of St Margaret	Thrandeston	Parish Church	15th century	29 July 1955	TM1165776451; 52°20′43″N 1°06′21″E	1032763	Church of St Margaret More images	
Church of St Andrew	Tostock	Parish Church	14th century	15 November 1954	TL9605163627; 52°14′09″N 0°52′11″E	1352395	Church of St Andrew More images	
Church of St Mary	Walsham-le-Willows	Parish Church	15th century	15 November 1954	TL9997471111; 52°18′06″N 0°55′53″E	1182197	Church of St Mary More images	
Church of St Margaret	Westhorpe	Parish Church	14th century	29 July 1955	TM0437469232; 52°17′00″N 0°59′41″E	1033142	Church of St Margaret More images	
Church of St Mary the Virgin	Wetherden	Parish Church	c.1500	9 December 1955	TM0085462778; 52°13′36″N 0°56′22″E	1284607	Church of St Mary the Virgin More images	
Church of All Saints	Wetheringsett	Church	15th century	29 July 1955	TM1273266845; 52°15′31″N 1°06′56″E	1284593	Church of All Saints More images	
Church of St Andrew	Wickham Skeith	Church	15th century	29 July 1955	TM0996869280; 52°16′54″N 1°04′36″E	1352521	Church of St Andrew More images	
Church of St Mary	Wilby	Parish Church	15th century	29 July 1955	TM2414872050; 52°18′03″N 1°17′10″E	1181714	Church of St Mary More images	
Church of St Andrew	Wingfield	Parish Church	15th century	29 July 1955	TM2300476812; 52°20′38″N 1°16′21″E	1032889	Church of St Andrew More images	
Wingfield Castle	Wingfield Green, Wingfield	House	14th century	29 July 1955	TM2220277211; 52°20′53″N 1°15′40″E	1032894	Wingfield Castle More images	
Church of St Mary	Woolpit	Parish Church	15th century	15 November 1954	TL9744262479; 52°13′30″N 0°53′22″E	1181376	Church of St Mary More images	
Church of St Mary	Worlingworth	Parish Church	c. 1300	29 July 1955	TM2336468642; 52°16′14″N 1°16′20″E	1032364	Church of St Mary More images	
Church of St Mary the Virgin	Wortham	Parish Church	14th century	29 July 1955	TM0835778806; 52°22′04″N 1°03′32″E	1032741	Church of St Mary the Virgin More images	
Church of St George	Wyverstone	Parish Church	14th century	29 July 1955	TM0420567860; 52°16′15″N 0°59′29″E	1181648	Church of St George More images	
Church of St Mary	Yaxley	Parish Church	14th century	29 July 1955	TM1209773897; 52°19′20″N 1°06′39″E	1033114	Church of St Mary More images	

== See also ==
- Grade I listed buildings in Suffolk
