= Stephen Soame =

Member of the Parliament of England

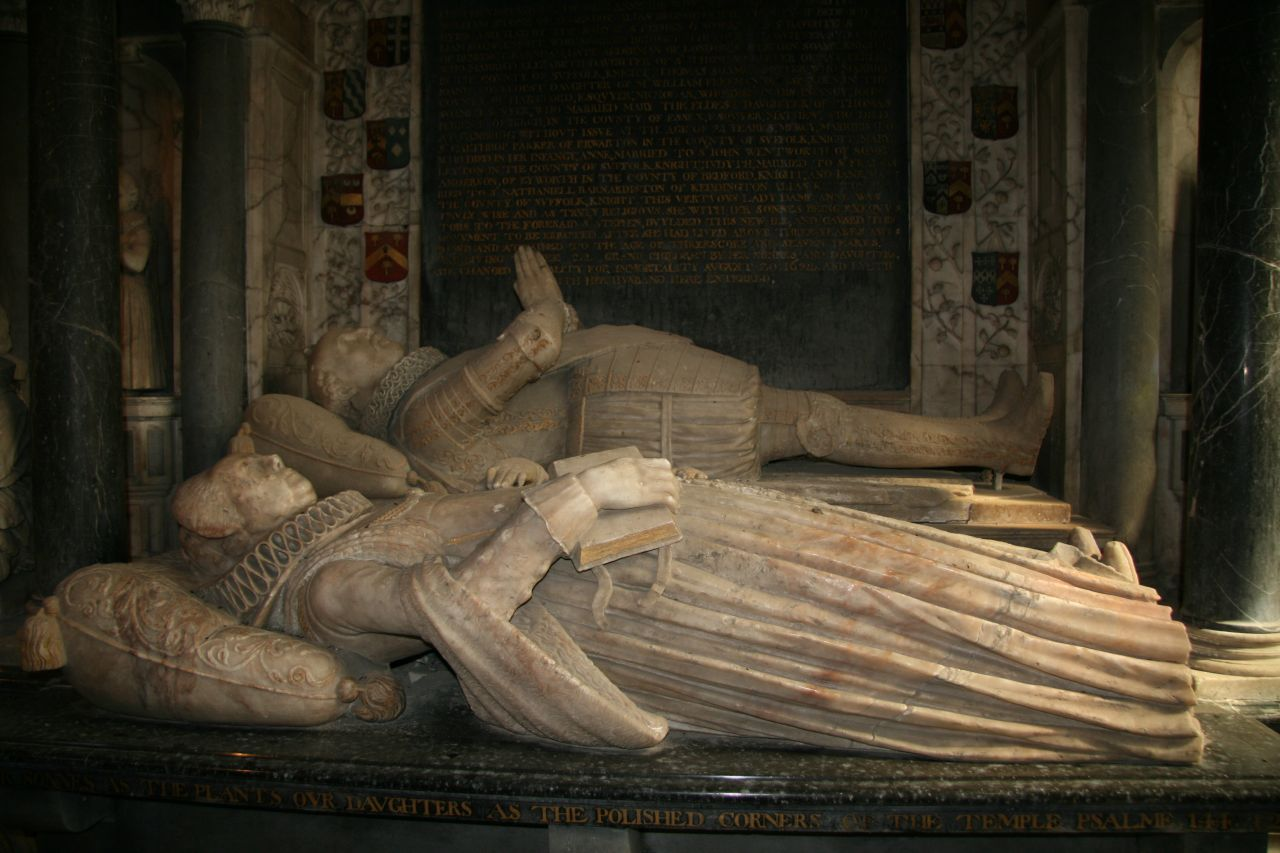
Sir Stephen and Dame Anne Soame

Sir Stephen Soame (c. 1540 – 23 May 1619) was an English merchant, landowner and politician who sat in the House of Commons in 1601. He served as Lord Mayor of London for the year 1598 to 1599.

== Career ==
Soame was the second son of Thomas Soame, of Betely alias Beetley, Norfolk (Launditch Hundred), and his first wife Anne, sister and heir of Francis Knighton of Little Bradley, Suffolk, and widow of Richard Le Hunt of Little Bradley. His elder brother was Thomas Soame, gent. (died 1606, aged 64), of Little Bradley, Suffolk, where he has a memorial brass. One of his younger brothers, Robert Soame (1542-1609), became Master of Peterhouse and Vice-Chancellor of the University of Cambridge. Their father Thomas died at Beetley in April 1569, and by his inquisition post mortem held in the following August he was found to be seised of lands in Little Bradley and Little Thurlow, in Suffolk, and at Beetley, North Elmham, Bilney, Great Bittering and Gressingham in Norfolk: his eldest son and heir Thomas was (according to the inquisition) then aged twenty-six.

Stephen Soame was originally a member of the Worshipful Company of Girdlers, into which he was apprenticed in the ward of Cheap in the City of London. He married, during the 1570s, Anne (1555-1622), daughter of the London Haberdasher William Stone and his wife Marye Gray, daughter of John Gray of Barley, Hertfordshire. Their eldest son, William Soame, was born about 1580. His business in the cloth trade lay largely with the Eastland Company from its charter in 1579, but was suffering losses in his trade with the Netherlands when in 1589 the Privy Council sought to obtain his temporary admission to the Merchant Adventurers to stabilize his affairs. He served as Sheriff of London in 1589, becoming alderman for Cheap ward in the same year (which he continued to represent until his death in 1619).

In 1598 he was elected Master of the Girdlers' Company: however, in the same year he was chosen to be Lord Mayor of London, but was found to be ineligible to that office "on accounte of belongyng to an inferior Companie and not one of the twelve greate Companies." He therefore petitioned to be admitted to the Worshipful Company of Grocers, and transferred to them: so he proceeded to the Mayoralty. This caused great offence to the Girdlers, who had his heraldic arms (gules, a chevron between three mallets or) removed from their hall. A painted portrait of Soame exists, after the manner of Marcus Gheeraerts the Younger, which includes several armorial escutcheons showing impalements. In 1600 he was among the aldermen led by Mayor Sir Nicholas Mosley who unsuccessfully appealed to the Marquess of Winchester for funds for the repair of the steeple of the church of the Austin Friars.

As Lord Mayor, Soame presided over the first meeting of merchants to consider the formation of the East India Company. In 1605 he was named among the principals in the Charter granted by James I to revive the Levant Company, and he was among the prominent merchants involved in Alderman Sir William Cockayne's project. Also in 1605, when the Spanish Company was fully reconstituted, he wrote requesting admission, but received the reply that, since he was already free of the Staple merchants and the East merchants, he could not be admitted except by payment of a fine or by procuring a similar freedom for one of their own members. A member offering £100 for admission to the Staple merchants, Soame's application was approved. His will refers to a significant East India Company investment, and to his "great Adventures [i.e. investments] abroade in Turkey and in many other places out of the kingdom". One version of his portrait includes an inset scene of a merchantman at sea. According to his epitaph, he was Mayor of the Staple in London for nearly 20 years.

Serving as President of the Bethlem and Bridewell in 1598-99, he was knighted in April 1599. He was elected a Member of Parliament for the City of London in 1601. He was Surveyor-General of Hospitals in 1609-1610 and Comptroller-General of Hospitals from 1610 until his death.

== Projects ==
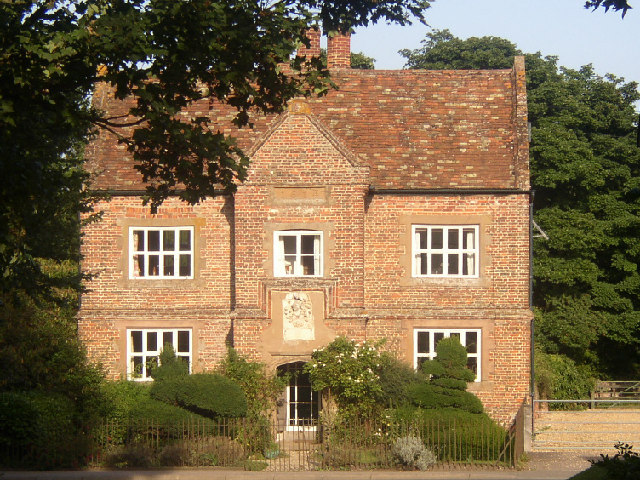
The Soame schoolhouse at Thurlow

Soame's epitaph shows that he was responsible for building the mansion house at Little Thurlow which became his residence there, and in which he died. It was burnt down in 1809, but drawings exist which show a very substantial late Elizabethan or early Jacobean mansion of three main storeys, with a frontage to full height of 11 bays, of which the third, sixth (with main entrance) and ninth projected forward. The rooflines were concealed behind a parapet with pinnacles or small turrets at the quoins and in the midst of the recessed bays, and with small lights to fenestrate the attic spaces. A thumbnail elevation is also shown in a survey by John Coulter of 1735, when extensive formal gardens were laid out. His City of London home was on the west side of Soper Lane, adjacent to that of Sir Roger Martyn.

Soame made considerable charitable donations. He restored and reglazed the great north window of St Paul's Cathedral, and also (at the cost of £500) restored the ceiling of Grocers' Hall. He made several provisions in his will for regular distributions of food to the poor, and to prisoners in London. He built a free school at Little Thurlow with maintenance for a master and usher, for the benefit of children to be taught English and Latin reading and cipher in preparation for admission to the universities: Should the numbers and ages of the students warranted, he also made provision for part of the church of Little Thurlow to be used as an additional schoolroom, a responsibility which he entrusted to his widow in his will. (His brother Robert had similarly made over the chancel of Girton church, of which he was rector, as a schoolroom.) He also erected almshouses for eight or nine poor single men and women aged over 64, with small pensions for their maintenance.

== Manorial holdings ==
Both school and almshouses were to be maintained from an annuity to be raised from his manor of Carlton, Cambridgeshire, which had been the seat of William Morden, husband of Stephen's sister Frances Soame, and which Soame purchased during his last years. In West Suffolk, Little Bradley manor (Overhall) had been sold to John le Hunt (who also held Netherhall) in 1565, allied to Soame through his mother's first marriage. The manor of Little Thurlow itself had passed to Thomas Turner in 1572, and from him to Thomas Wisbicke, who sold it to Soame, perhaps in 1582, when a fine was levied. In 1595 Soame brought a Chancery suit against Wisbicke to protect his title as lord of the manor. Soame's lands there included an estate called "The Temple". The manor of Cowlinge was in Soame's possession at the time of his death, when he bequeathed it to his son Stephen. The manor at Hundon to which Hundon church was attached, both demised in Soame's will, was part of those former possessions of Stoke-by-Clare College which had been granted to Sir John Cheke in 1548.

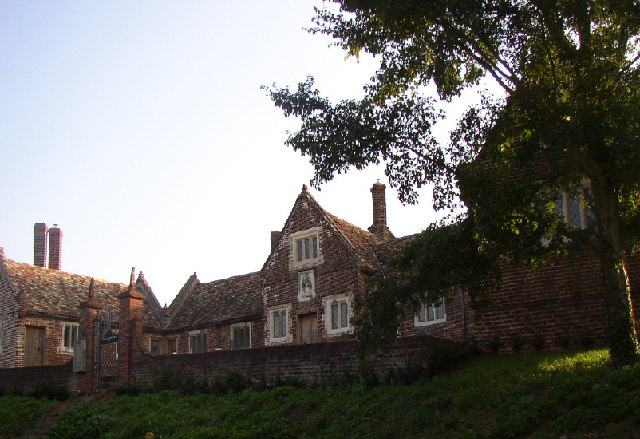
The Soame almshouses at Thurlow

In the Lackford Hundred, the manor of Herringswell (which came to Soame) was sold and assured to Reginald and William Stone by Thomas, Lord Howard in 1591 and 1595 (and so to Dame Anne Soame), and that of Freckenham was sold to Soame by Sir Oliver Cromwell in 1600. Further east, Sir Thomas Reade sold the manor of Earl Stonham (formerly a possession of Sir Thomas Gresham) to Soame by fine in 1594. A vellum map of the manor of Earl Stonham, Suffolk, dated 1587, made by the surveyor Thomas Clarke of Stamford Baron and bearing the arms of Sir Stephen Soame, was exhibited in December 1849. Nicholas Turner had licence to alienate the manor of Thorney Campsey at Stowupland (Stow Hundred) to Soame in 1598: in the same year Lady Dorothy Stafford had licence to alienate the manor of Wetheringsett (in Hartismere) to him, and the sale was completed in 1600. He also held premises in Mendlesham. His title in the manor of Northall alias Cornhall at Bures St Mary (Babergh) is mentioned in 1609, but presumably came earlier in connection with the marriage of his daughter Jane Soame to Sir Nathaniel Barnardiston, in which family it was formerly held.

Further afield, Soame held lands in Essex at White Colne, the manor of Goldingham at Bulmer, and at Harlow, and also the manor of Heydon near Barley. He had property at Guilden Morden in Cambridgeshire. In east Hertfordshire he held the manor of Berkesdon at Aspenden, and further west that of Brickendonbury, south of Hertford, which he purchased from Edmond Allen for £1000 in 1588. He also had manors in Kent.

== Death and memorial ==
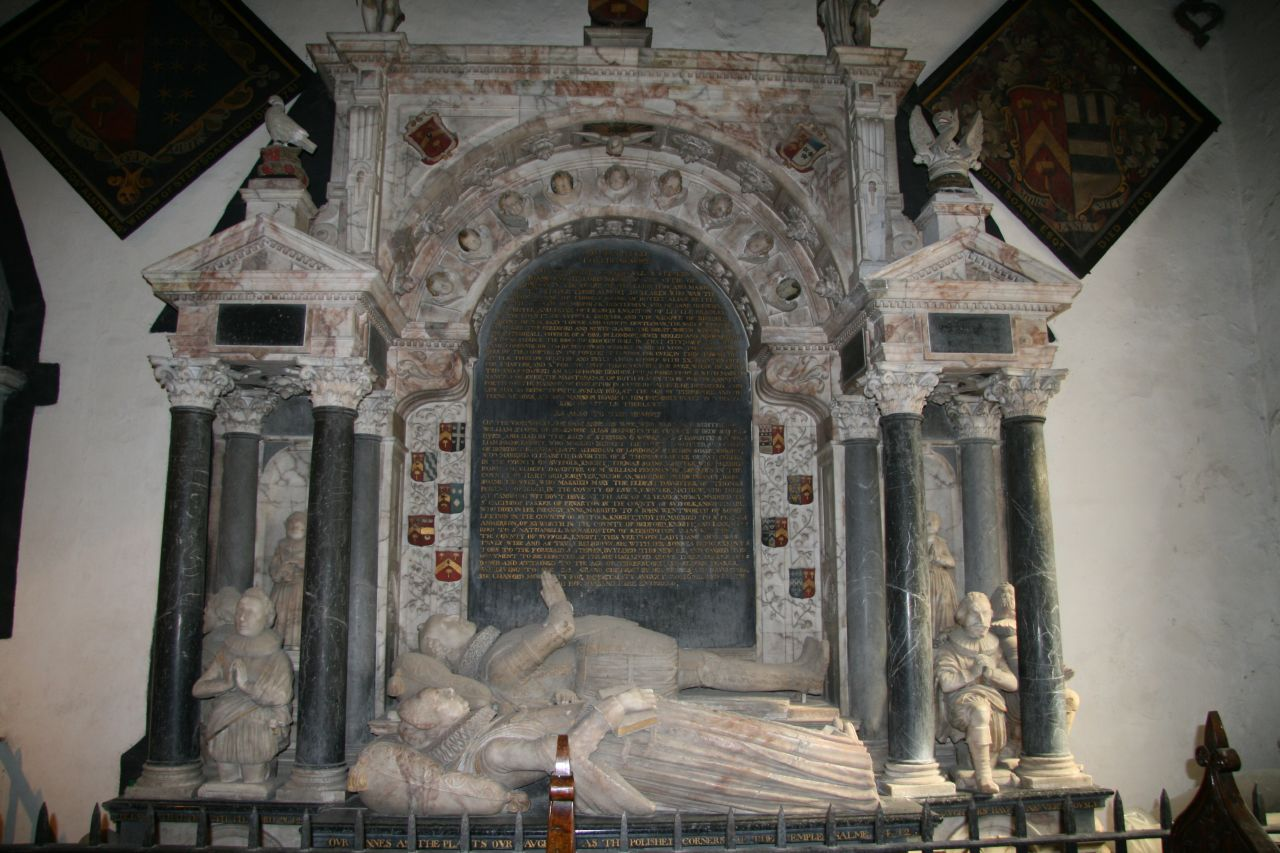
The figures and upper works of the Soame monument

Soame died at the age of 76 on 23 May 1619 at his mansion house in Little Thurlow, and was buried there on 23 June following. His lengthy will was proved in January 1619/20: the register copy is decorated in the margins with a foliate surround and an escutcheon of his arms. He was buried in the church at Little Thurlow, and gave instructions that no announcement of his funeral was to be made in London. His monument, which is very elaborate, has a long and informative memorial inscription. Upon a highly polished black marble slab raised over the tomb chest, the life-sized effigies of Sir Stephen and Dame Anne are carved in the round in reddish-veined white marble with rich costume details, recumbent upon cushions, he (raised, behind) with hands at prayer and she (lower, forward) with hands lowered, in the right hand a book. They are shown as if lying at Heaven Gate. The edge of the slab is inscribed "Our sonnes as the plants, our daughters as the polished corners of the Temple" (a paraphrase of Psalm 144, vs. 12). The monument was commissioned by Dame Anne and is attributed to the London sculptor Gerard Johnson: she had the aisle which contains it newly built.

The very long gilt-lettered inscription on a black stone is framed within a high round-arched recess (the portal) in a reddish-veined marble surround, its arch resting on consoles as capitals, and the nine stones of the arch itself each carved with the head and wings of an angel (cherubim), with the dove of the Holy Spirit descending centrally. The reveals or jambs of the arch are carved and painted with polychrome heraldic escutcheons showing impalements. The arched register depicting angels is itself recessed within a larger arch, with fluted pilasters at either side rising to a horizontal entablature. This supports a pair of winged classical figures (male and female) above, and a central escutcheon for Soame surmounted by the crested helm: a single escutcheon is set diagonally in each of the spandrels of the outer arch. Do the effigies lie at the door of the mansions of the blest, or the mansions of Stephen's ancestors?

At either side of this central feature surmounting the figures, there project forward two tall open-sided pavilions or tempietti with pitched roofs and deep frontally-pedimented entablatures with dentillated bed-moulds, each supporting a heraldic crest above: each is supported by four tall polished columns of dark figured marble with exuberant white Corinthian capitals, and within each of these outworks there appear groups of figures (Soame's children) as mourners carved in the round. Three kneeling daughters appear as mourners in front of the lower part of the monument, which is altogether a very sumptuous creation. It has recently undergone careful restoration.

== Family ==
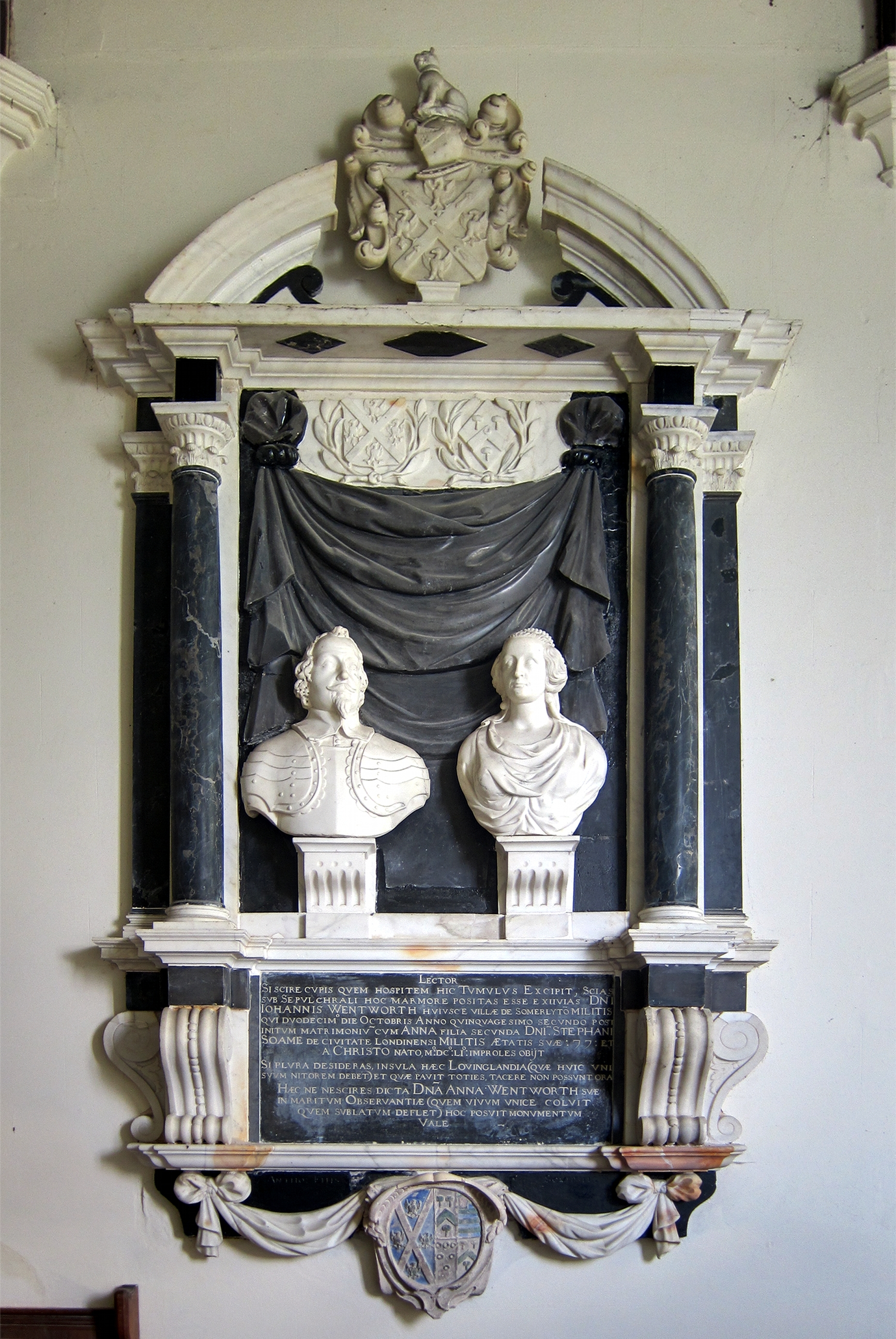
Monument to Anne Soame and her husband Sir John Wentworth, Somerleyton Church, Suffolk

Soame married Anne Stone (1555-1622), daughter of William Stone, haberdasher of London, and his wife Marye Gray, daughter of John Gray of Barley, Hertfordshire. Their children are shown in the Visitations of 1634-36 and in the monumental epitaph as follows:

- (Sir) William Soame, married Bridget, daughter and heir of Benedict Barnham, alderman of London.
- (Sir) Stephen Soame, of Haydon, Essex, married Elizabeth daughter of Thomas Playter of Sotterley, Suffolk.
- (Sir) Thomas Soame, Sheriff and MP for London, married Joan daughter of William Freeman of Aspenden, Hertfordshire.
- Nicholas Soame, died in infancy.
- John Soame, Esquire, of Burnham Westgate, Norfolk, married Mary daughter of Thomas Perient, Esq., of Birch, Essex.
- Matthew Soame, of Cambridge, who died without issue aged 21.
- Marcy Soame, married Sir Calthrop Parker of Erwarton, Suffolk.
- Mary Soame, died in infancy.
- Jane Soame, married Sir Nathaniel Barnardiston of Ketton, Suffolk.
- Anne Soame, married Sir John Wentworth of Somerleyton, Suffolk.
- Judith Soame, married Sir Francis Anderson of Eyworth, Bedfordshire.

The epitaph continues: "This virtuous Lady Dame Anne was truly wise, and as truly religious. She, with her Sonnes, being Exequutors to the aforesaid Sir Stephen, builded this new Ile, and caused this Monument to be erected, after she had lived above three yeares a Widdowe, and attained to the age of three score and seaven yeares, and living to see 22 Grandchildren, by her sonnes and daughters. She changed Mortality for Immortality, August 20, 1622, and lyeth with her husband here interr'd."

Parliament of England
Preceded by Sir John Hart; John Croke [III] George Southerton; Thomas Fettiplace	Member of Parliament for City of London; 1601; With: John Croke [III] Thomas Fettiplace; John Pynder	Succeeded by Sir Henry Billingsley; Sir Henry Montague; Nicholas Fuller; Richard Gore
Civic offices
Preceded by Hugh Offley; Richard Saltonstall	Sheriffs of the City of London; 1590–1591; With: Richard Gurney	Succeeded by Robert Broke; Nicholas Mosley
Preceded by Richard Saltonstall	Lord Mayor of London; 1598	Succeeded by Nicholas Mosley
