= Suffolk Committees for Scandalous Ministers =

The Suffolk Committees for Scandalous Ministers were two committees commissioned by the Earl of Manchester between 24 February and 15 March 1644 in accordance with an ordinance published on 22 January 1644. Manchester had been pressing for authorisation to remove 'scandalous ministers' for some time. This term referred to "any minister who was non-resident, incompetent or idle, scandalous either in life or in doctrine, or in any way ill-affected to Parliament".

== Committeemen ==
=== First Commission ===
Transcribed by Francis Hill.

Name	Location	High Sherriff of Suffolk	Other positions	Notes	Refs
Sir Edmund Bacon	Redgrave	1634			
Sir William Spring	Pakenham	1641	Deputy Lieutenant from 1642		
William Soame	Little Thurlow	1633			
Maurice Barrow	Barningham	1643			
Brampton Gurdon (senior)	Assington	1629	MP for Sudbury 1621–1622		
Henry North (senior)	Laxfield	1620			
Thomas Tirrell	Gipping				
Edmund Harvey	Wickham Skeith				
Brampton Gurdon (junior)	Assington				
Samuel Moody	Bury St Edmunds		MP for Bury St Edmunds 1654–1659		

=== Second Commission ===
Transcribed by Francis Hill.

Name	Location	High Sherriff of Suffolk	Other positions	Notes	Refs
Sir John Wentworth	Somerleyton	1619			
Francis Bacon	Ipswich				
Nathaniel Bacon	Ipswich				
Nathaniel Bacon	Friston				
Francis Brewster	Wrentham				
William Blois	Grundisburgh	1620			
Robert Brewster	Wrentham				
Robert Duncon	Ipswich			Brother of Samuel Duncon	
Peter Fisher	Ipswich				
John Base	Saxmundham				
