= Richard Martin (British Army officer) =

Colonel Sir Richard Edward Rowley Martin KCB KCMG (2 September 1847 – 15 May 1907) was a British Army officer and colonial official.

Martin was born in Hemingstone, the fourth son of Richard Bartholomew Martin, of Hemingstone Hall, Suffolk.

Martin purchased a commission in the 77th (East Middlesex) Regiment of Foot in 1867; he subsequently transferred into the 6th (Inniskilling) Dragoons. He served in the First Boer War of 1881 and was promoted to lieutenant-colonel in 1886. In 1888 he was British Commissioner in Togoland. In 1889 he became the commanding officer of his regiment, and Martin was promoted to colonel in 1890. Between 1890 and 1895 he served as British Representative on the late Provisional Government Committee in Swaziland, and was made Knight Commander of the Order of St Michael and St George in 1895. Martin subsequently became Commandant-General of the British South Africa Company's police in Bechuanaland, Matabeleland and Mashonaland until 1898. He was made Knight Commander of the Order of the Bath in the 1898 Birthday Honours.

He married Efa Florence Phillipps, daughter of Major Charles Burch Phillipps, of Barham Hall, Suffolk, in 1898. They had a son and daughter.
