= Henry Lee-Warner =

Henry Lee-Warner:

- Henry Lee Warner (politician) (1688–1760), English landowner and politician
- Henry Lee-Warner (classical scholar) (1842–1925), English classics teacher
