= Listed buildings in Wortham, Suffolk =

Civil Parish in Suffolk, England

Wortham is a village and civil parish in the Mid Suffolk District of Suffolk, England. It contains 58 listed buildings that are recorded in the National Heritage List for England. Of these one is grade I, one is grade II* and 56 are grade II.

This list is based on the information retrieved online from Historic England.

== Key ==
Grade	Criteria
I	Buildings that are of exceptional interest
II*	Particularly important buildings of more than special interest
II	Buildings that are of special interest

== Listing ==
Name	Grade	Location	Type	Completed (Note: The date given is the date used by Historic England as significant for the initial building or that of an important part in the structure's description.)	Date designated	Grid ref. (Note: The grid reference is based on the British national grid reference system, sometimes known as OSGB36, used by the Ordnance Survey.) Geo-coordinates	Notes	Entry number (Note: The "List Entry Number" is a unique number assigned to each listed building and scheduled monument by Historic England.)	Image	Wikidata
1, Brook Road	II	1, Brook Road			17 November 1987	TM0853676551; 52°20′50″N 1°03′37″E		1182727	Upload Photo	Q26477963
2, Brook Road	II	2, Brook Road			17 November 1987	TM0856876570; 52°20′51″N 1°03′39″E		1032770	Upload Photo	Q26284201
Hill Top Cottages	II	1 and 2, Bury Road			17 November 1987	TM0866277144; 52°21′09″N 1°03′45″E		1352259	Upload Photo	Q26635292
The Rookery	II	Bury Road			29 July 1955	TM0937477144; 52°21′08″N 1°04′22″E		1182737	Upload Photo	Q26477970
Lockleys	II	Chapel Lane			17 November 1987	TM0797676579; 52°20′52″N 1°03′07″E		1284403	Upload Photo	Q26573176
Outbuilding About 40 Metres South of Lockleys	II	Chapel Lane			17 November 1987	TM0798476536; 52°20′51″N 1°03′08″E		1032771	Upload Photo	Q26284202
Prospect Farm House	II	Chapel Lane			17 November 1987	TM0797276512; 52°20′50″N 1°03′07″E		1352260	Upload Photo	Q26635293
Ellesmere House	II	Church Road			17 November 1987	TM0826077846; 52°21′33″N 1°03′25″E		1182751	Upload Photo	Q26477983
Willow Corner Cottage	II	Church Road			17 November 1987	TM0820177681; 52°21′27″N 1°03′22″E		1032772	Upload Photo	Q26284203
Wortham War Memorial	II	Church Road, IP22 1SL	war memorial		4 January 2021	TM0834178728; 52°22′01″N 1°03′31″E		1470613	Wortham War Memorial More images	Q104770850
Crinkle Crankle Walls to North West of Park House	II	Lion Road			17 November 1987	TM0980277597; 52°21′23″N 1°04′46″E		1284698	Upload Photo	Q26573445
Grey Cottage	II	Long Green			17 November 1987	TM0807277124; 52°21′10″N 1°03′14″E		1032735	Upload Photo	Q26284165
Honeypot Farm House	II	Long Green			17 November 1987	TM0851677124; 52°21′09″N 1°03′37″E		1032734	Upload Photo	Q26284164
House Approximately 80 Metres West of Ivy House Farm House	II	Long Green			17 November 1987	TM0735577252; 52°21′15″N 1°02′36″E		1284291	Upload Photo	Q26573077
House at Rogers Corner Immediately East of Oakcroft	II	Long Green			17 November 1987	TM0763277216; 52°21′13″N 1°02′51″E		1182882	Upload Photo	Q26478106
Ivy House Farm House	II	Long Green			17 November 1987	TM0743977276; 52°21′15″N 1°02′41″E		1352284	Upload Photo	Q26635316
La Chaume	II	Long Green			17 November 1987	TM0810677442; 52°21′20″N 1°03′16″E		1352262	Upload Photo	Q26635295
Lime Tree Farm House	II	Long Green			17 November 1987	TM0837277392; 52°21′18″N 1°03′30″E		1284359	Upload Photo	Q26573137
Oak Wood House	II	Long Green			17 November 1987	TM0724477240; 52°21′15″N 1°02′30″E		1032737	Upload Photo	Q26284167
Outbuilding Immediately South East of Walnut Tree Farmhouse	II	Long Green			31 January 1990	TM0773777156; 52°21′11″N 1°02′56″E		1032749	Upload Photo	Q26284180
Schools Gateway	II	Long Green			17 November 1987	TM0830777133; 52°21′10″N 1°03′26″E		1352283	Upload Photo	Q26635315
South View	II	Long Green			17 November 1987	TM0775477382; 52°21′18″N 1°02′57″E		1032774	Upload Photo	Q26284206
Southmore Cottage	II	Long Green			17 November 1987	TM0790077207; 52°21′13″N 1°03′05″E		1032736	Upload Photo	Q26284166
Tarragon Cottage	II	Long Green			17 November 1987	TM0822677038; 52°21′07″N 1°03′22″E		1284343	Upload Photo	Q26573122
The Old Queens	II	Long Green			17 November 1987	TM0869677265; 52°21′13″N 1°03′47″E		1284339	Upload Photo	Q26573118
The Old Stores	II	Long Green			17 November 1987	TM0806277175; 52°21′11″N 1°03′13″E		1284344	Upload Photo	Q26573123
The Post Office and Shop House	II	Long Green			29 July 1955	TM0858177260; 52°21′13″N 1°03′41″E		1032775	Upload Photo	Q26284208
Walnut Tree Farmhouse	II	Long Green			31 January 1990	TM0772677165; 52°21′11″N 1°02′56″E		1251791	Upload Photo	Q26543724
White House Farm House	II	Long Green			17 November 1987	TM0789877362; 52°21′18″N 1°03′05″E		1182788	Upload Photo	Q26478017
Dashes Farm House	II	Low Road			17 November 1987	TM0672979774; 52°22′37″N 1°02′09″E		1182970	Upload Photo	Q26478192
Forecourt Walls and Gatepiers Immediately South of Ling Farm House	II	Low Road			29 July 1955	TM0820279734; 52°22′34″N 1°03′26″E		1352285	Upload Photo	Q26635317
Hill Barn	II	Low Road			14 November 1982	TM0769279697; 52°22′33″N 1°02′59″E		1284289	Upload Photo	Q26573075
Ling Farm House	II	Low Road			29 July 1955	TM0819879758; 52°22′35″N 1°03′26″E		1182947	Upload Photo	Q26478171
Sundial About 40 Metres East of the Manor House	II	Low Road			17 November 1987	TM0786879736; 52°22′34″N 1°03′09″E		1032739	Upload Photo	Q26284170
The Manor House	II*	Low Road			29 July 1955	TM0782379749; 52°22′35″N 1°03′06″E		1032738	Upload Photo	Q17535599
Lavender Cottage	II	Magpie Green			17 November 1987	TM0726378449; 52°21′54″N 1°02′34″E		1183030	Upload Photo	Q26478251
Pondside	II	Magpie Green			17 November 1987	TM0726678433; 52°21′53″N 1°02′34″E		1032740	Upload Photo	Q26284171
The Cottage	II	Magpie Green			17 November 1987	TM0725878555; 52°21′57″N 1°02′34″E		1352286	Upload Photo	Q26635318
Brook Cottage	II	Mellis Road			17 November 1987	TM0841477084; 52°21′08″N 1°03′32″E		1352287	Upload Photo	Q26635319
Brook House	II	Mellis Road			29 July 1955	TM0838277088; 52°21′08″N 1°03′30″E		1284268	Upload Photo	Q26573056
Brookside Farm House	II	Mellis Road			17 November 1987	TM0873676526; 52°20′49″N 1°03′47″E		1183056	Upload Photo	Q26478271
Beech Tree Farm Cottage	II	Rectory Road			29 July 1955	TM0898478962; 52°22′08″N 1°04′06″E		1183135	Upload Photo	Q26478341
Church of St Mary the Virgin	I	Rectory Road	church building		29 July 1955	TM0835778806; 52°22′04″N 1°03′32″E		1032741	Church of St Mary the Virgin More images	Q17526043
Pond Cottage	II	Rectory Road			17 November 1987	TM0892778878; 52°22′05″N 1°04′03″E		1183120	Upload Photo	Q26478327
The Hemplands	II	Rectory Road			17 November 1987	TM0913679309; 52°22′19″N 1°04′15″E		1032743	Upload Photo	Q26284173
Wellhead Gear to West of Wortham House	II	Rectory Road			17 November 1987	TM0878578657; 52°21′58″N 1°03′55″E		1032742	Upload Photo	Q26284172
Wortham House	II	Rectory Road			29 July 1955	TM0880378661; 52°21′58″N 1°03′56″E		1284216	Upload Photo	Q26573009
Barn About 50 Metres South of Hall Farm Cottages	II	Redgrave Road			17 November 1987	TM0839778906; 52°22′07″N 1°03′35″E		1183148	Upload Photo	Q26478355
Hall Farm Cottages	II	Redgrave Road			17 November 1987	TM0840378952; 52°22′08″N 1°03′35″E		1032744	Upload Photo	Q26284174
Holly Farm House	II	Redgrave Road			17 November 1987	TM0664478505; 52°21′56″N 1°02′01″E		1032745	Upload Photo	Q26284175
Beehive Cottage	II	The Ling			17 November 1987	TM0901079318; 52°22′19″N 1°04′08″E		1284409	Upload Photo	Q26573182
Pollard Tree Farm House	II	The Ling			17 November 1987	TM0924479115; 52°22′12″N 1°04′20″E		1182754	Upload Photo	Q26477986
Wellhead to North of Beehive Cottage	II	The Ling			17 November 1987	TM0900879327; 52°22′20″N 1°04′08″E		1352261	Upload Photo	Q26635294
Willow Lodge	II	The Ling			17 November 1987	TM0914879384; 52°22′21″N 1°04′16″E		1032773	Upload Photo	Q26284205
Thatched Cottage	II	Union Lane			17 November 1987	TM0935178730; 52°22′00″N 1°04′25″E		1284204	Upload Photo	Q26572998
Cottage Approximately 30 Metres West South West of the Willows	II	Willow Corner			17 November 1987	TM0814877530; 52°21′23″N 1°03′19″E		1032746	Upload Photo	Q26284177
The Willows	II	Willow Corner			17 November 1987	TM0818977545; 52°21′23″N 1°03′21″E		1032747	Upload Photo	Q26284178
Two Cottages Approximately 60 Metres North of the Willows	II	Willow Corner			17 November 1987	TM0820077618; 52°21′25″N 1°03′22″E		1183181	Upload Photo	Q26478383

== See also ==
- Grade I listed buildings in Suffolk
- Grade II* listed buildings in Suffolk

== Sources ==
- Bettely, James; Pevsner, Nikolaus (2015) [1961], Suffolk: West, The Buildings of England, New Haven and London: Yale University Press, ISBN 978-0-300-19655-9
