= William Soame =

William Soame (1579–1655) was an English merchant, landowner and politician. He was High Sheriff of Suffolk in 1633 and a committeeman on one of the Suffolk Committees for Scandalous Ministers.

He was the eldest son of Stephen Soame (c. 1540 – 1619) and his wife, Anne Stone (1555–1622), daughter of William Stone, haberdasher of London. He was the elder brother of:

- Thomas Soame, Member of Parliament for City of London 1640–1648
- Marcy Soame, wife of Sir Calthrop Parker of Erwarton,
- Jane Soame, married Sir Nathaniel Barnardiston of Ketton, Suffolk.
- Anne Soame, married Sir John Wentworth of Somerleyton, Suffolk.

He married Bridget, daughter and heir of Benedict Barnham, an alderman of London. Her sister Alice married Sir Francis Bacon, 1st Viscount St Alban in 1606.
