= Joseph Henry Longford =

British consular official (1849–1925)

- Born: 25 July 1849; Dublin, Ireland
- Died: 12 May 1925 (aged 76); London, England
- Occupations: consular official, professor

Joseph Henry Longford (25 June 1849 in Dublin – 12 May 1925 in London) was a British consular official in the British Japan Consular Service from 24 February 1869 until 15 August 1902. He was Consul in Formosa (1895–97) after the First Sino-Japanese War and at Nagasaki (1897–1902).

After retiring from the service he became the first Professor of Japanese at King's College London until 1916, and then an emeritus professor of the University of London. He was awarded a D.Litt. by his alma mater, Queen's University of Belfast in 1919.

Although not in the front rank of British Japanologists in the 19th century occupied by Ernest Satow, Basil Hall Chamberlain, William George Aston and arguably Frederick Victor Dickins, he did make a notable contribution in the field of early Japanese studies.

== Japanophile ==
Longford laboured long and hard to produce several readable and compendious books on Japan and as a member of the Japan Society of London was a strong supporter of maintaining good Anglo-Japanese relations. He realised that Britain held Hong Kong and Singapore only as long as the Japanese allowed her to do so, and urged the importance of studying Japan on British readers.

== Books ==
- 1877 -- The Penal Code of Japan
- 1907 -- Japan (Living Races of Mankind)
- 1910 -- 'The Regeneration of Japan', in Cambridge Modern History, vol. 12 (1910)
- 1910 -- The Story of Old Japan
- 1911 -- The Story of Korea
- 1911 -- Japan of the Japanese. New York: C. Scribner's sons. OCLC 2971290
- 1913 -- The Evolution of New Japan
- 1915 -- Japan (Spirit of the Allied Nations)
- 1920 -- Japan (Harmsworth Encyclopedia)
- 1923 -- Japan (Nations of Today)

== See also ==
- Ernest Mason Satow
- John Harington Gubbins
- Thomas Blake Glover - a friend of Longford
- William George Aston
- Anglo-Japanese relations
