= John Harington Gubbins =

British linguist, consular official & diplomat (1852-1929)

- Born: 24 January 1852; India
- Died: 23 February 1929 (aged 77); Edinburgh, Scotland
- Occupations: Consular official, scholar

John Harington Gubbins CMG (24 January 1852 – 23 February 1929) was a British linguist, consular official and diplomat. He was the father of Sir Colin McVean Gubbins.

== Education ==
Gubbins attended Harrow School and would have gone on to Cambridge University, had family finances allowed.

== Career ==
Gubbins was appointed a student interpreter in the British Japan Consular Service in 1871. He was English Secretary to the Conference at Tokyo for the Revision of the Treaties, after Ernest Satow left Japan in 1883. On 1 June 1889, he was appointed Japanese Secretary in Tokyo.

He was employed in London at the Foreign Office from February to July 1894 in the Aoki-Kimberley negotiations which resulted in the Anglo-Japanese Treaty of Commerce and Navigation (16 July 1894). He was appointed CMG in the 1898 Birthday Honours.

He was, especially in retirement, a close friend of Satow. He was elected the first President of the newly founded Royal Asiatic Society Korea Branch in 1900.

Despite having no university degree, Gubbins was awarded an honorary master's degree from Balliol College and was made Lecturer in Japanese language at Oxford University (1909–12). Lack of pupils led to his position being terminated.

== Family ==
Gubbins frequently visited Colin Alexander McVean at his residence in Yamato Yashiki, Tokyo in the 1870s, and met McVean's daughter Helen. After McVean returned to Scotland and settled down on the Isle of Mull, Gubbins visited the McVean family and met Helen again. 41-year-old Gubbins and 24-year-old Helen fell in love and were married in Newington, Scotland, in 1894, then lived in Japan. They had four children, who spent much time with the McVeans on the Isle of Mull. The second son was Colin McVean Gubbins, later chief of the Special Operations Executive.

== See also ==
- Joseph Henry Longford
