= Alexander Gollan =

British diplomat

Sir Alexander Gollan KCMG (1840 – 5 May 1902) was a British diplomat who served 40 years in the consular service, ending as British Consul-General for Cuba 1892–1898.

== Career ==
Gollam was appointed British Vice-Consul at Pernambuco, Brazil, in 1856. He was in charge of the consulate at Rio Grande do Sul 1862–1865, then moved to Chile where he served at Coquimbo and Valparaíso. In 1876 he was appointed Consul for Nicaragua. After further service in Brazil, he was in 1885 transferred to the Philippines, where he stayed for seven years. From 1892 until November 1898 he was Consul-General in the Island of Cuba. He received the 1897 Jubilee Medal and was appointed a Knight Commander of the Order of St Michael and St George (KCMG) in the May 1898 Birthday Honours list.

While in Pernambuco, he was in the late 1850s awarded the Royal Humane Society´s silver medal for saving a life.

He died in London on 5 May 1902.

== Family ==
Gollan married, in 1865, Leonidia Cordeira, daughter of D. R. Cordeiro, of Rio Grand do Sul. Sir Henry Cowper Gollan (1868-1949) was a son.
