= Samuel Duncon =

English political writer

- Born: 1607; Mendlesham
- Died: 1680 (aged 72–73); Ardleigh
- Occupation: Haberdasher
- Known for: Puritan activism

Samuel Duncon (1607 – 1680) was an English political writer, a citizen of Ipswich, of considerable means, and devoted to the parliamentary side in the English Civil War.

== Early life ==
Duncon was born in 1607 in Mendlesham. He was the second son of John Duncon, a tanner living in Mendlesham. His elder brother, Robert Duncon was also born in Mendlesham, a year earlier in 1607. In 1624 at the age of 17 Samuel started his apprenticeship with Edmund Kene, a merchant and Portman of Ipswich completing it eight years later, being formally admitted as a Freeman of Ipswich Corporation in April 1632.

== Civic and puritan activism ==
In 1640, he was "strayed three times" for refusing to pay ship-money. He was ordered to march with the king's forces against the Scots; but he was allowed, after some troublesome negotiations, to hire a substitute. Processes were also begun against him in the commissaries' court and the court of arches. This caused him to repair several times to London, and led finally to his being "damnified about £300". Duncon complained to the parliament, but without result. When the English Civil War broke out, he as well as his father and father-in-law, aided the parliament with many contributions, by raising troops (which brought him into direct communication with Cromwell), and by acting as high collector of assessments until 1651.

== Works ==
Duncon wrote:

1. Several Propositions of publick concernment presented to his Excellency the Lord Generall Cromwell, 1651.
2. Several Proposals offered by a Friend to Peace and Truth to the serious consideration of the keepers of the Liberties of the People of England, 1659.

The chief end of these tracts is (besides the recital of the author's sacrifices for the Commonwealth) towards the "settling of peacemakers in every city and county of this nation". These peacemakers were to be the "most understanding plain honest-harted men" that the people of the district could find. Their function was to be to settle all sorts of disputes, and thus avoid as far as possible the necessity for law courts.

== Death ==
Duncon died in 1680 at Ardleigh.
