= William Lee-Warner =

British author and colonial administrator

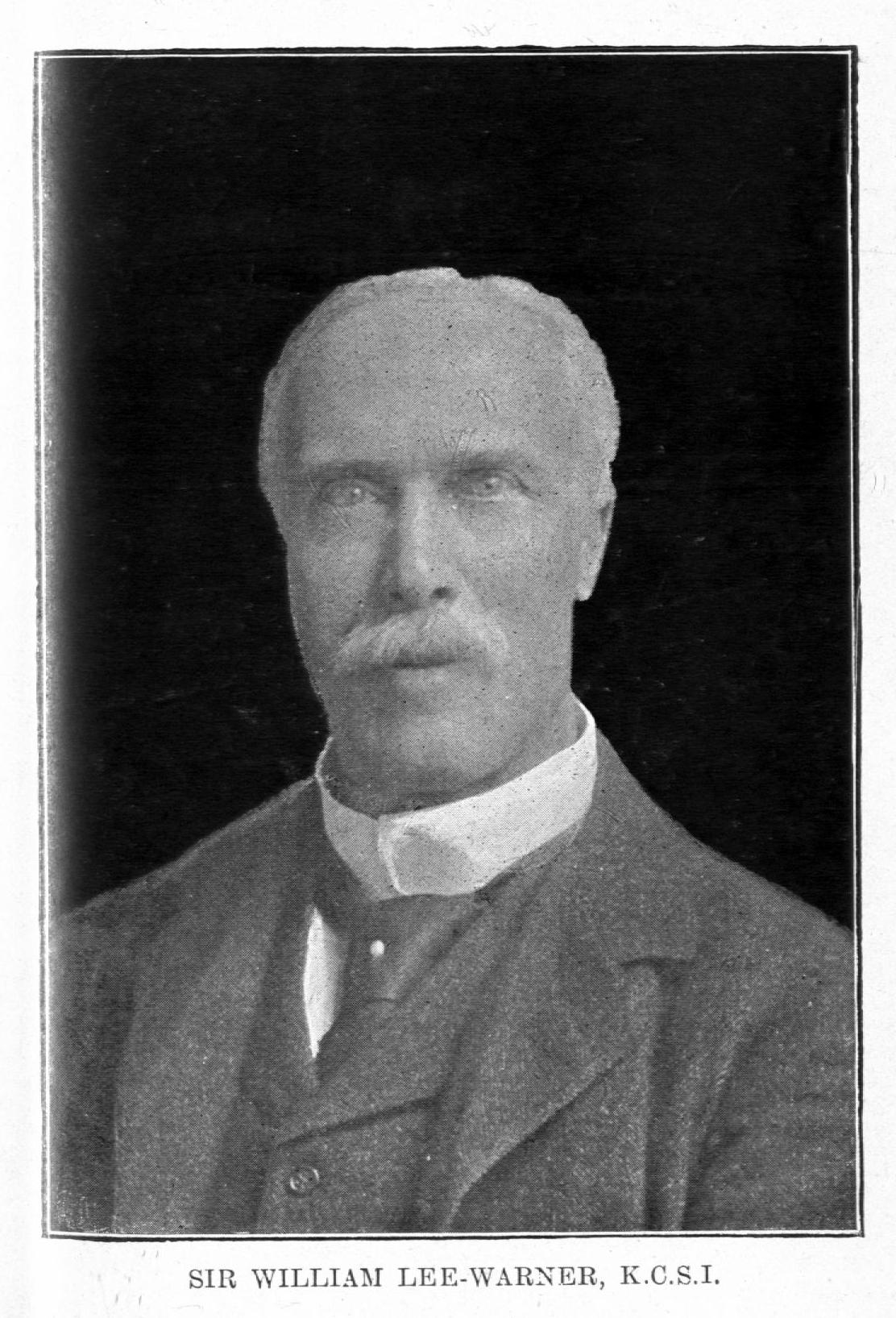
Sir William Lee-Warner

Sir William Lee-Warner GCSI (18 April 1846 – 18 January 1914) was a British author and colonial administrator in the Indian Civil Service. He was Chief Commissioner of Coorg in 1895. In 1907 he headed the eponymous Lee Warner Committee that examined Indians receiving education in Britain.

== Early life and education ==
Lee-Warner was born in Little Walsingham into a prominent Norfolk family. He was the fourth son of the Rev. Canon Henry James Lee-Warner of Thorpland Hall (whose father had changed the family name from Woodward) and Anne Astley, daughter of Henry Nicholas Astley. His maternal great-grandfather was Sir Edward Astley, 4th Baronet. His brother John Lee-Warner also joined the Indian Civil Service and another brother, Henry Lee-Warner, was the Liberal Party candidate for South-West Norfolk in Parliament in 1892. His brother Edward Lee-Warner wrote articles for the Dictionary of National Biography. He was educated at Rugby School and matriculated in 1865 at St John's College, Cambridge, where he excelled in athletics. He earned his bachelor's degree in 1869, taking honours in the moral sciences tripos, and graduated M.A. in 1872.

== Career ==
Lee-Warner joined the Bombay Civil Service in 1869, and his lengthy career included district, secretariat, educational, and political experience. He served as Director of Public Instruction in Berar, private secretary to the Governor of Bombay Sir Philip Wodehouse, Director of Public Instruction in Bombay, and Under-Secretary to the Government of India in the Foreign Department. He spent six years as Chief Secretary to the Bombay Government, and he represented the province of Bombay for two terms on the Supreme Legislature. He also founded the first "up-country" nursing association for Europeans and a Society for the Prevention of Cruelty to Animals in Bombay and in Sind.

A fellow of the University of Bombay, he occasionally gave lectures at Indian colleges. In 1894, he published Protected Princes of India, which was revised and retitled The Native States of India in 1910, when it was published by Macmillan. In 1909, he contributed a chapter on India and Afghanistan to The Cambridge Modern History and the Grolier Society Book of History. In 1904, he authored a biography of 1st Marquess of Dalhousie.

In 1907, Lee Warner was chosen to head a committee that looked at the situation of Indian students in British Universities. This was established due to a general feeling that Indian students did not make the best of the education system and that they were becoming radical nationalists at the places where they lived, notably Shyamji Krishna Varma's India House at Highgate. The report was based on interviews with 35 Indian students and 65 Europeans. The report was not published, presumably because it could offend Indians. It was published only in 1922 as an appendix to the Lytton report.

He published another small book entitled The Citizen of India, which according to The Times in 1914, "met with hearty approval among thoughtful Indians as setting a high and just ideal of civic duty and British and Indian cooperation." He received an honorary LL.D. from Cambridge.

In 1895, Lord George Hamilton requested Lee-Warner return to England to serve as Secretary of the Political and Secret Department at the India Office. He was appointed to the Secretary of State's Council of India in October 1902, serving until 1910.

== Honours ==
Lee-Warner was appointed a Companion Order of the Star of India (CSI) in the 1892 New Year Honours. He was knighted in the same order (KCSI) in the 1898 Birthday Honours and promoted, upon the recommendation of Viscount Morley, to Knight Grand Commander (GCSI) in the 1911 New Year Honours, an honour typically reserved for Viceroys, Governors, and Secretaries of State in British India.

== Personal life ==
In 1876, Lee-Warner married Ellen Paulina, eldest daughter of Major-General Henry William Holland, CB, in Bray, County Wicklow, Ireland. They had four sons: Cecil John Lee-Warner (1879–1907), who drowned aged 28, while bathing at Nanaimo, Vancouver Island; William Hamilton Lee-Warner, OBE (1880–1943);who served in the Colonial Civil Service, Philip Henry Lee-Warner (1886–1925), who married an American from Boston; and Roland Paul Lee-Warner (1892–1960).

In 1914, Sir William died of heart failure following a case of accidental blood poisoning.
