= Peter Fisher (Puritan) =

Peter Fisher (fl. 1626–1657) was a puritan politician active in Ipswich, Suffolk in the seventeenth century.

== Civic roles in Ipswich ==
Fisher was a mercer whose civic career in Ipswich started in the 1620s, when he shared the role of Ipswich Corporation Chamberlain with Barnaby Burroughe for 1626/7.

In 1630 he compiled with others a surveyors account detailing payments from residents, the names of those who performed statute labour, (i.e. unpaid mandatory labour required for upkeep of the roads) and any payment made to labourers. From 1639 until 1644 he was Town Treasurer.

Fisher was one of a number of committeemen in Ipswich who participated in the second commission of the Suffolk Committees for Scandalous Ministers.

== Family life ==
Peter married a daughter of Robert Snelling, Portman of Ipswich. Snelling had two other daughters who married Edmund Calamy the Elder and Matthew Newcomen
