= Wortham Ling =

Protected area in Suffolk, England

Coordinates: 52.37°N 1.07°E

- Site of Special Scientific Interest
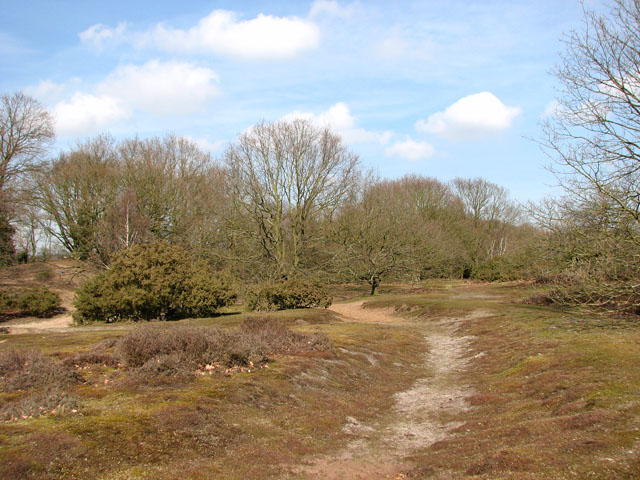
- Location of Wortham Ling.
- Area of search: Suffolk
- Grid reference: TM 092 795
- Interest: Biological
- Area: 53.2 hectares
- Notification date: 1990
- Location map: Magic Map

Wortham Ling is a 53.2-hectare (131-acre) biological Site of Special Scientific Interest north of Wortham in Suffolk.

This site has acid grassland and dry heath on a sandy soil. Some areas are intensely grazed by rabbits, producing a very short sward which is a suitable habitat for lichens and mosses. Butterflies include many graylings.

There is access to the site from several roads and footpaths.
