= Nathaniel Bacon of Friston =

Nathaniel Bacon of Friston (15 May, 1593 Friston-7 August 1644, Friston) was a committeeman active with the Second Commission of the Suffolk Committees for Scandalous Ministers.

Nathaniel was the father of Thomas Bacon, MP.

== Suffolk Committees for Scandalous Ministers ==
This Nathaniel Bacon served alongside another Nathaniel Bacon Recorder of Ipswich on the Second Commission on some occasions attending the same sessions. However, Clive Holmes notes that as the other Nathaniel Bacon was permanent chairman of the standing Committee of the Eastern Association, which met on a daily basis during 1644, he was unable to carry out his role as Recorder of Ipswich. Holmes argues that this supports his contention that Nathaniel Bacon of Friston is the committeeman who attend 12 of 13 sessions of the second commission which met in Ipswich of Yoxford.
