= Great Bricett Priory =

Monastery in Suffolk, England

Coordinates: 52.11681°N 0.97628°E

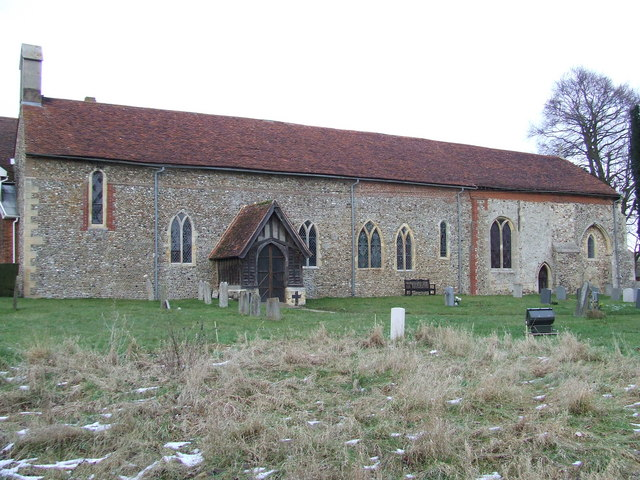
Church of St Mary & St Lawrence, Great Bricett

Great Bricett Priory was a medieval monastic house in Great Bricett in Suffolk, England, the chapel of which is now in use as the Church of England parish church of St Mary and St Lawrence.

== History ==
The Augustinian priory was founded between 1114 and 1119, as a dependency of Saint-Léonard-de-Noblat. The founders, Ralph and Emma FitzBrian, endowed the priory with the tithes of Bricett and of 'Losa' with its chapel, a moiety of the church of 'Stepla,' (Steeple in Essex) and the associated church of Stangate, Essex, in addition to various plots of land in the vicinity. The founder also gave to the canons a large garden on the south of the monastery and a smaller one on the east, and he ordained that whenever he was in Suffolk the canons were to act as his chaplains and to receive a tithe of his bread and beer.

The priory of Bricett was claimed, early in the thirteenth century, as pertaining to the monastery of Nobiliac, in the diocese of Limoges and the Duchy of Berry. This claim was resisted, but in 1295 an agreement was arrived at favourable to the foreign house, whereby Bricett became an alien priory; this composition was renewed and confirmed by the Bishop of Norwich in the chapter house of Bricett, on 16 July 1310. In a long list of royal protections to religious houses in 1295, in return for bestowing on the king a tithe of their income, the priory of Bricett is described as a cell to the priory of 'Noblac in Lymoche's'.

In 1325 Thomas Durant and Margaret his wife obtained licence to enfeoff John de Bohun of a fourth part of the manor of Great Bricett, together with the advowson of the priory of St Leonard of the same town.

Licence was granted in 1331 for the alienation by Thomas le Archer, rector of nearby Elmsett, and Richard his brother, to the prior and canons of Bricett of three parts of the manor of Great Bricett, of the yearly value of £7. The fourth part of the manor of Great Bricett of the annual value of 36s. 8d. was assigned to the priory in 1346 by Richard Hacoun and Anne his wife. In the same year John Bardoun and Isabel his wife released to the prior and canons of St Leonard's all their right and claim in the manor of Great Bricett.

The prior, with a great number of other priors of alien houses and cells, was summoned to appear before the council at Westminster, on the morrow of Midsummer, 1346, "to speak with them on things that shall be set forth to them," upon pain of forfeiture and the loss of the priory, lands, and goods.

It became a Crown possession after the suppression of alien cells in 1414. It was burnt down in 1416, and reoccupied, since the prior was listed at Osney in 1443. In 1444 Henry VI granted the whole of the possessions to his college of SS. Mary and Nicholas (afterwards King's College, Cambridge), Cambridge. This grant was confirmed by the same king in 1452, and it was again renewed by Edward IV in the first year of his reign, namely on 24 February 1462.

Excavations in 1926 showed that the present church of SS. Mary and Lawrence incorporates the remains of the Priory church. The position of the E. and W. doors on the N. side of the nave, the lines of the Norman transept and the E. wall of the Manor House are suggestive of a cloister. The uncovering of a wall in the farmhouse exposed a circa 1270 wooden arcade, and led to the discovery that this substantially 13th-century building was in fact the western range of the cloister.

== Notable figures ==
The Priors of Bricett were:

- William Randulf, appointed 1312;
- John de Essex, appointed 1337;
- Alan de Codenham, appointed 1372;
- Nicholas Barne, appointed 1399.

== Current state ==
The building today appears modest but bears many indications of its remarkable heritage. The former monastery quadrangle to the north side is now the garden of Great Bricett Hall, which was also part of the monastery and is structurally joined to the church. To the south lay a pair of cottages believed to date back 300 years, which once belonged to King's College, Cambridge, to the west a pair or Victorian cottages, and to the east the village hall, previously the village school with the addition of the Victorian school house.

The church is fronted by a protected village green.
