= 1898 Birthday Honours =

National awards given by Queen Victoria

The Queen's Birthday Honours 1898 were announced on 21 May 1898 in celebration of the birthday of Queen Victoria. The list included appointments to various orders and honours of the United Kingdom and British India.

The list was published in The Times on 21 May 1898 and the various honours were gazetted in The London Gazette on 21 June 1898, and on 3 June 1898.

The recipients of honours are displayed or referred to as they were styled before their new honour, and arranged by honour and where appropriate by rank (Knight Grand Cross, Knight Commander, etc.) then divisions (Military, Civil).

== Peerages ==
=== Baron ===
- Josslyn Pennington, Lord Muncaster
- Sir Arthur Haliburton, GCB

== Privy Council ==
- Sir George Taubman Goldie, KCMG
- James Alexander Campbell, Esq., MP
- James William Lowther, Esq., MP
- Edmond Robert Wodehouse, Esq., MP

== Baronet ==
- Thomas Andros de La Rue, Esq.
- Robert Dundas, of Arniston
- James Rankin, Esq., MP
- Henry Tate, Esq.

== Knight Bachelor ==
- Charles Hubert Hastings Parry, Esq., Mus. Doc., Director of the Royal College of Music
- Henry Charles Fischer, Esq., CMG
- John Gunn, Esq.
- Colonel Arthur Wellington Marshall
- Marcus Samuel, Esq.
- Swire Smith, Esq.
- Edward Knox, Esq., late Member of the Legislative Council, New South Wales
- James Reading Fairfax, Esq., New South Wales
- John Langdon Bonython, Esq., South Australia
- Ormond Drimmie Malcolm, Esq., QC, Chief Justice of the Bahamas

== The Most Honourable Order of the Bath ==
=== Knight Grand Cross of the Order of the Bath (GCB) ===
- General His Royal Highness Arthur William Patrick Albert, Duke of Connaught and Strathearn, K.G., K.T., K.P., G.C.S.I, G.C.M.G., G.C.I.E., G.C.V.O., K.C.B., A.D.C., Commanding the Troops, Aldershot.

=== Knight Commander of the Order of the Bath (KCB) ===
Military Division

- General Hugh Rowlands, V.C., C.B.
- General John James Hood Gordon, C.B., Indian Staff Corps, Member of Council of India.
- General Stanley de Burgh Edwardes, C.B., Indian Army.
- Vice-Admiral Lord Charles Thomas Montagu-Douglas-Scott, C.B. (Civil).
- General John Davis, C.B., Commanding the Troops, Southern District.
- Major-General Coleridge Grove, C.B., Military Secretary at Headquarters.
- Vice-Admiral Richard Edward Tracey, President of the Royal Naval College.
- Vice-Admiral Compton Edward Domvile, Admiral Superintendent of Naval Reserves.
- Major-General Raymond Hervey, Viscount Frankfort de Montmorency.

Civil Division

- Colonel Sir Richard Edward Rowley Martin, K.C.M.G.
- Kenneth Augustus Muir MacKenzie, Esq., C.B., Q.C., Permanent Secretary of the Lord Chancellor's Office and Clerk of the Crown.
- Hamilton John Agmondesham Cuffe, Esq., C.B. (commonly called the Honourable Hamilton John Agmondesham Cuffe, C.B.), Solicitor to the Treasury, Director of Public Prosecutions.
- Edward Leigh Pemberton, Esq., C.B., late Assistant Under Secretary of State, Home Office.
- Kenelm Edward Digby, Esq., Under Secretary of State, Home Office.
- John Murray, Esq.

=== Companion of the Order of the Bath (CB) ===
Military Division

- Surgeon-Major-General Robert Harvey, D.S.O., Indian Medical Service.
- Colonel (Brigadier-General) Donald James Sim McLeod, D.S.O., Commanding a Second Class District in India.
- Lieutenant-Colonel and Brevet Colonel Henry Hamilton Settle, D.S.O., Royal Engineers, Assistant Inspector-General of Fortifications.
- Lieutenant-Colonel and Brevet Colonel Reginald Chalmer, half-pay.
- Colonel the Honourable Frederick William Stopford, Assistant Adjutant-General (Officer in charge of Mobilization Services), Headquarters.
- Lieutenant-Colonel and Brevet Colonel Charles Edward Beckett, 3rd Hussars.

Civil Division

- Victor Arthur Wellington Drummond, Esq., Minister Resident at Munich.
- Charles Norton Edgcumbe Eliot, Esq., a Second Secretary in the Diplomatic Service.
- John Fergusson, Esq., Chief Inspector, Stamps and Taxes Department, Inland Revenue.
- Edward Henry French, Esq., late of the Consular Service.
- George William Hervey, Esq., Secretary and Comptroller-General, National Debt Office.
- John Macdonell, Esq.
- Richmond Ritchie, Esq., India Office.
- Horace Alfred Damer Seymour, Esq., Deputy Master and Comptroller of the Mint.
- Charles Malcolm Wood, Esq.

== Order of the Star of India ==
=== Knight Grand Commander of the Order of the Star of India (GCSI) ===
- His Highness the Maharaja of Patiala.

=== Knight Commander of the Order of the Star of India (KCSI) ===
- William Lee-Warner, Esq., C.S.I., Political Secretary, India Office.
- Trevor John Chichele Chichele-Plowden, Esq., C.S.I., Indian Civil Service.

=== Companion of the Order of the Star of India (CSI) ===
- Thomas Stoker, Esq., Indian Civil Service.
- Colonel Maule Campbell Brackenbury, Royal Engineers.
- Edward Richard Henry, Esq., Indian Civil Service.
- Lucas White King, Esq., Indian Civil Service.
- Khan Bahadur Yar Muhammad Khan.

== Order of St Michael and St George ==
=== Knight Grand Cross of the Order of St Michael and St George (GCMG) ===
- His Excellency Mostafa Fahmy Pasha, President of the Egyptian Council of Ministers.
- General Sir Arthur James Lyon Fremantle, K.C.M.G., C.B., Governor and Commander-in-Chief of the Island of Malta and its Dependencies.

=== Knight Commander of the Order of St Michael and St George (KCMG) ===
- Major Edward FitzGerald Law, Her Majesty's Commissioner on the International Financial Commission in Athens.
- Alexander Gollan, Esq., Her Majesty's Consul-General at Havana.
- Thomas Berry Cusack-Smith, Esq., Her Majesty's Consul-General at Valparaíso.
- Surgeon Lieutenant-Colonel John Godfrey Rogers, CMG, Head of the Egyptian Sanitary Department.
- The Honourable Charles Alphonse Pantaléon Pelletier, C.M.G., Speaker of the Senate of the Dominion of Canada.
- The Honourable James David Edgar, Q.C., Speaker of the House of Commons of the Dominion of Canada.
- John George Bourinot, Esq., LL.D., D.C.L., C.M.G., Clerk of the House of Commons of the Dominion of Canada.
- James Alexander Swettenham, Esq., C.M.G., Colonial Secretary of the Straits Settlements.

=== Companion of the Order of St Michael and St George (CMG) ===
- Monsieur Jean Baptiste Fillier, Suez Canal Company, for services rendered in connection with the salvage of HMS Victorious off Port Said.
- Monsieur Edouard Quellennee, Suez Canal Company, for services rendered in connection with the salvage of HMS Victorious off Port Said.
- Colonel Douglas Frederick Rawdon Dawson, Military Attaché to Her Majesty's Embassy, Paris.
- George Head Barclay, Esq., Second Secretary to Her Majesty's Embassy, Madrid.
- Captain Count Gleichen, for services on the recent Mission to the Emperor of Abyssinia.
- John Harington Gubbins, Esq., Japanese Secretary to Her Majesty's Legation, Tokyo.
- William George Wagstaff, Esq., Her Majesty's Consul-General, Rio de Janeiro.
- William Willcocks, Esq., Egyptian Irrigation Department.
- Edward William Perceval Foster, Esq., late of the Egyptian Irrigation Department.
- Henry Martyn Herbert Orpen, Esq., Assistant Treasurer, Accountant-General, Receiver-General, and Paymaster-General of the Colony of the Cape of Good Hope.
- David Hunter, Esq., General Manager of the Government Railways of the Colony of Natal.
- George Ruthven Le Hunte, Esq., M.A., Colonial Secretary of the Colony of Mauritius.
- James Haldane Stewart Lockhart, Esq., Colonial Secretary and Registrar-General of the Colony of Hong Kong.
- George Robert Parkin, Esq., LL.D., Principal of Upper Canada College, Toronto, in the Dominion of Canada.
- Sydney Olivier, Esq., B.A., of the Colonial Department.

== Order of the Indian Empire ==
=== Knight Commander of the Order of the Indian Empire (KCIE) ===
- His Highness Aga Sultan Muhammad Shah Aga Khan.
- Colonel Robert Warburton, C.S.I., Indian Staff Corps.

=== Companion of the Order of the Indian Empire (CIE) ===
- Alexander Pennycuick, Esq.
- Philip Chicheley Hyde Snow, Esq., Indian Civil Service.
- Brigade-Surgeon-Lieutenant-Colonel Arthur Mudge Branfoot, M.B.
- Edward Fountaine Jacob, Esq.
- Major Robert Irvin Scallon, D.S.O., Indian Staff Corps.
- Lieutenant Kunwar Bir Bikram Singh.
- Lieutenant Alfred Beckett Minchin, Indian Staff Corps.
- William Taylor Van Someren, Esq.
- Charles Still, Esq.
- Tahilram Khemchand.

== Promotions ==
Salute

The Queen has been graciously pleased to approve the grant to His Highness Sir Hira Singh Malwandar Bahadur, Raja of Nabha, GCSI, as a personal distinction, of an increase of two guns to his salute of 13 guns.

Army

- His Highness Maharaj Adhiraj Sir Madho Rao Scindia, Maharaja of Gwalior, GCSI, is granted the honorary rank of colonel.
