= Earl Stonham =

Village in Suffolk, England

Coordinates: 52.187°N 1.084°E

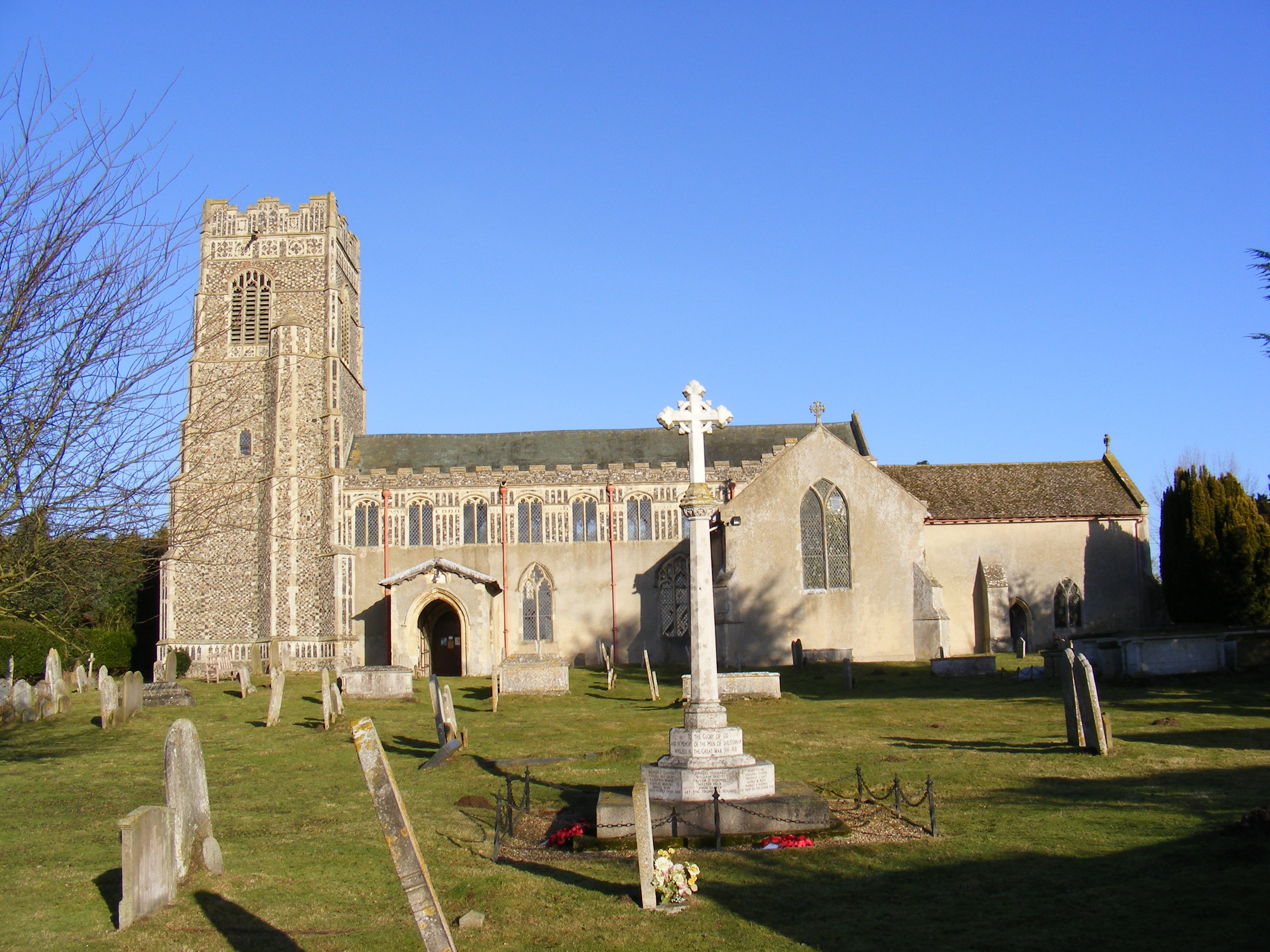
- St. Mary's Church, Earl Stonham

- Location within Suffolk
- Population: 650 (2005); 629 (2011)
- Civil parish: Earl Stonham
- District: Mid Suffolk
- Shire county: Suffolk
- Region: East
- Country: England
- Sovereign state: United Kingdom
- Post town: Stowmarket
- Postcode district: IP14
- Police: Suffolk
- Fire: Suffolk
- Ambulance: East of England

Earl Stonham is a small village and civil parish (formerly called Stonham Earl) in the Mid Suffolk district of Suffolk, England. It is between the A14 and A140 5 miles to the east of Stowmarket. The parish includes the hamlets of Forward Green and Middlewood Green. In 2005 its population was 650, decreasing to 629 at the 2011 Census.. The village is one of three Stonhams in the area – the other two are Stonham Aspal and Little Stonham.

== History ==
Dating back to Roman times, Earl Stonham is most famous for its church. St. Mary's Church is known for its ornately carved single hammerbeam roof which depict many different scenes, including court jesters, foxes, and many angels.

Much of the village life revolves around the village hall, located in the centre of the village. It is the home to a thriving cricket club, and a youth club.

Earl Stonham is a local hotspot for recreational walkers, with beautiful countryside and gentle footpaths.
