= St Mary's Church, Mendlesham =

Church of St Mary the Virgin, Mendlesham
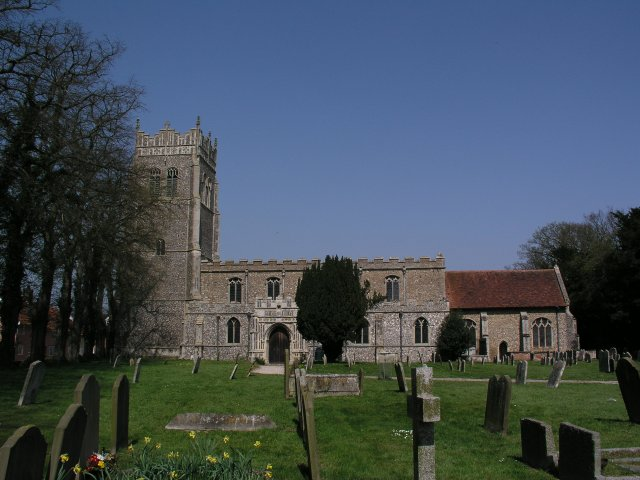
- Church of St Mary the Virgin, Mendlesham
- 52°14′59″N 1°4′59″E
- Location: Church Road, Mendlesham, Suffolk, IP14 5SF
- Country: England
- Denomination: Church of England
- Previous denomination: Roman Catholic Church
- Churchmanship: Traditional Anglo-Catholic

History
- Status: Active
- Dedication: St Mary the Virgin

Architecture
- Functional status: Parish church
- Heritage designation: Grade I listed
- Designated: 29 July 1955

Administration
- Diocese: Diocese of St Edmundsbury and Ipswich
- Archdeaconry: Archdeaconry of Ipswich
- Deanery: Stowmarket
- Parish: Mendlesham

Clergy
- Bishop: The Rt Revd Norman Banks (AEO)
- Vicar(s): Fr Philip T. Gray, SSC

The Church of St Mary the Virgin is a Church of England parish church in Mendlesham, Suffolk. The church is a grade I listed building.

== History ==
The earliest parts of the church are Medieval in date. The aisles have original doorways dating to the 13th century. The chancel dates to the 14th century. The square tower dates to the 15th century. The church was restored from 1864 to 1866.

On 29 July 1955, the church was designated a grade I listed building.

=== Present day ===
The parish of Mendlesham is part of the Archdeaconry of Ipswich in the Diocese of St Edmundsbury and Ipswich.

The church stands in the Traditional Anglo-Catholic tradition of the Church of England. As the parish rejects the ordination of women, it receives alternative episcopal oversight from the Bishop of Richborough (currently Norman Banks).
