= St Mary's Church, Wortham =

Church of St Mary
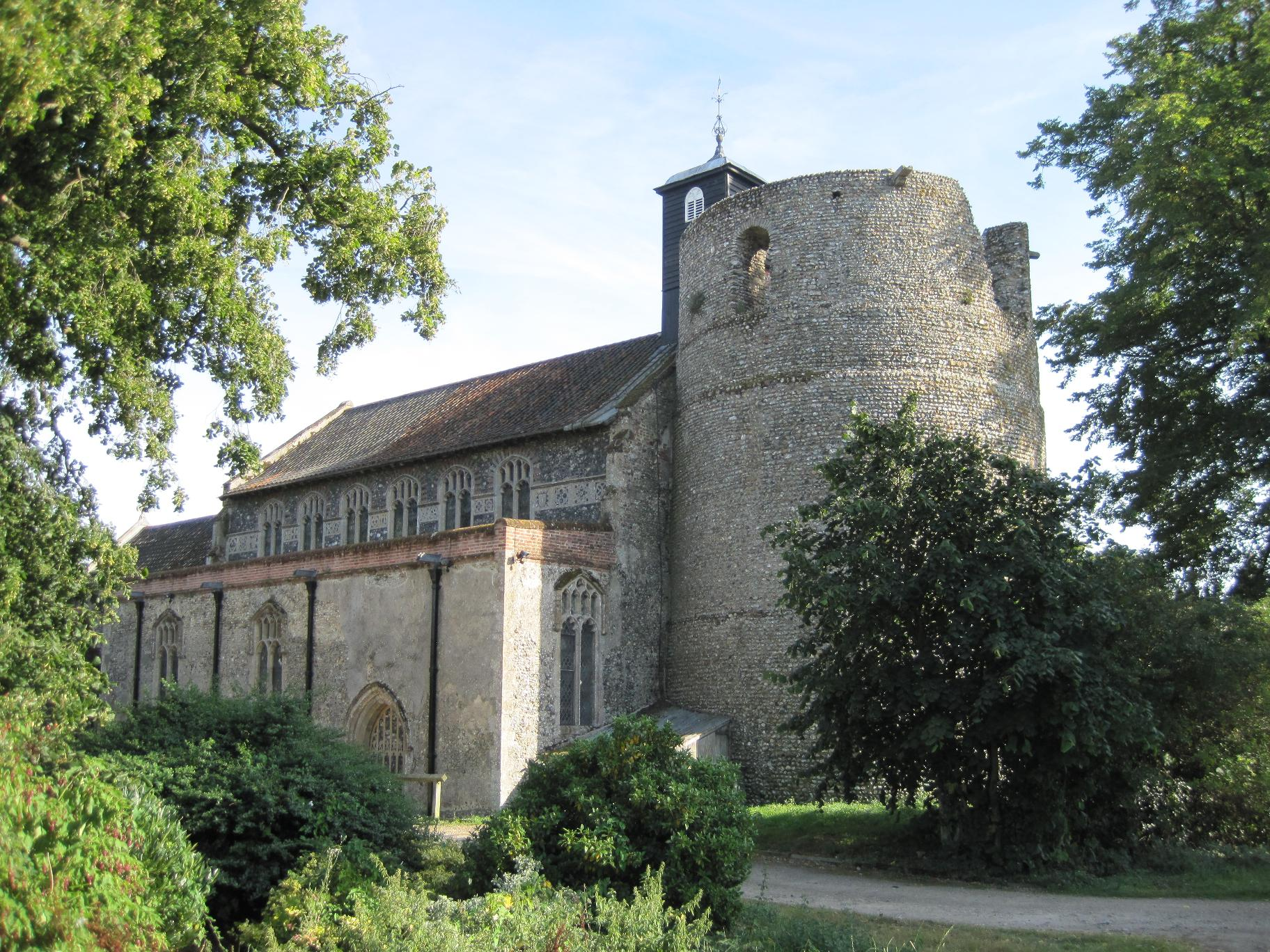
- Church of St Mary
- 52°22′3.720″N 1°3′32.508″E
- OS grid reference: TM 08357 78806
- Location: Wortham, Suffolk
- Country: England
- Denomination: Church of England

Architecture
- Heritage designation: Grade I
- Designated: 29 July 1955

Administration
- Diocese: St Edmundsbury and Ipswich

St Mary's Church is the parish church of Wortham in Suffolk, England, and in the Diocese of St Edmundsbury and Ipswich. It is a round-tower church; the tower is said to be the largest such in England. The building is Grade I listed.

== Description ==
The tower, of the early 12th century, has a diameter of 29 feet (8.8 m) and height 62 feet (19 m), and is said to be the largest Norman round tower in England. The upper part collapsed in 1789, and has since then been roofless. A coffin slab of Barnack stone, probably of the 12th century, is set below the hole which was formerly the west window of the tower. Next to the tower, at the west end of the nave, is an 18th-century weatherboarded turret with a weathervane, housing a bell.

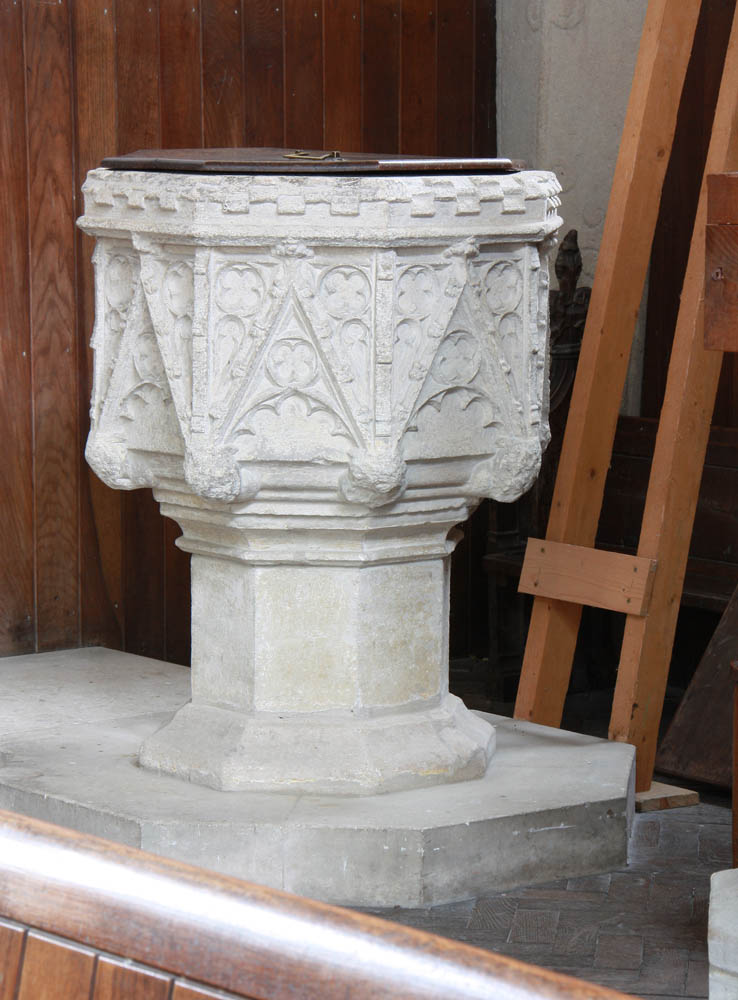
The font

The clerestory, of the early 15th century, has on each side six windows and a horizontal band of flushwork panels. The south porch was rebuilt in 1908. Inside, the chancel, nave and aisles with three-bay arcades date from the 14th century. The organ, at the west end, is set in front of the blocked tower arch. The font, near the door, is of the 14th century; it is octagonal with crocketted gables, fine tracery and brattishing around the top of the bowl. The pews, dating from 1893, have carved figures and animals at the ends of the benches.

Richard Cobbold, who became well known nationally as a writer, was the rector at Wortham from 1828 until his death in 1877.
