= Bilney =

Bilney is a surname. Notable people with the surname include:

- Gordon Bilney (1939–2012), Australian politician
- Ray Bilney (born 1945), Australian cyclist
- Thomas Bilney (c.1495–1531), English Christian martyr

== Other ==
- Bilney railway station, former station in Norfolk, England
