= Henry Lee-Warner (classical scholar) =

English classics teacher (1842–1925)

Henry Lee-Warner (3 January 1842, Little Walsingham, Norfolk – 8 November 1925) was an English classics teacher.

He was the second son of Rev. Henry James Lee-Warner (1802–1885). His younger brother was William Lee-Warner. He studied at Rugby school and Cambridge St. John's College. In 1865–1869 he was fellow of Cambridge St. John's College. In 1864–1885 he was assistant master in Rugby school. He was justice of the peace for Norfolk.

== Writings ==
- Extracts from Livy with English notes and maps (Oxford: Clarendon Press. Clarendon Press Series)
  - Part I. The Caudine disaster (1874; new ed. 1902)
  - Part II. Hannibal's campaign in Italy (1873; 1879^{2}; new ed. revised by Evelyn Abbott 1907)
  - Part III. The Macedonian war (1875; new ed. revised by T.W. Gould 1897)
- Hints and helps for Latin Elegiacs (Oxford: Clarendon Press, 1885. Clarendon Press Series)

== Sources ==
- Alumni Cantabrigienses: A Biographical List of All Known Students, Graduates and Holders of Office at the University of Cambridge, from the Earliest Times to 1900. Cambridge University Press, 2011
- Rugby School Register 1874–1904
- Strangway-Towneley: British Nobility and Landed Gentry in One Big Tree
