= Great Bricett Hall =

Farmhouse in Suffolk, England

Coordinates: 52°07′01″N 0°58′33″E

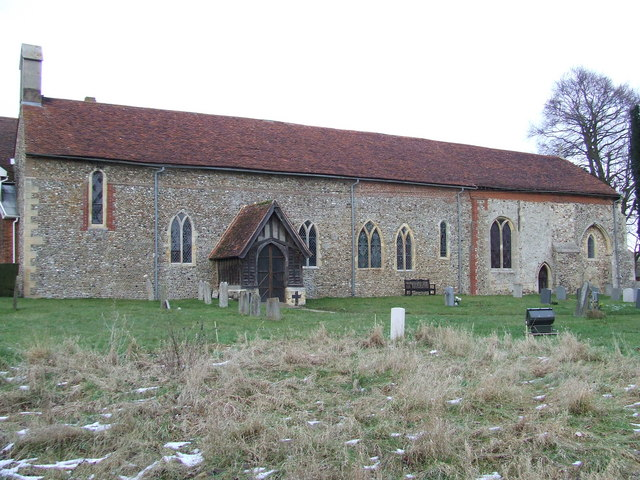
Church of St Mary & St Laurence, Great Bricett Hall behind at left

Great Bricett Hall is a grade I listed farmhouse in the village of Great Bricett, Suffolk, England.

It was built in the mid-13th century as the hall of the Augustinian Priory of St Leonard, next to the north side of what is now the Church of St Mary & St Laurence.

The Hall was once owned by John De Bohun, brother of Henry de Bohun who was killed by Robert the Bruce at the Battle of Bannockburn.

During the Second World War, it was used to house Italian prisoners. In 1947, it was bought by Percy Cooper.

It was home to farmer Rupert Cooper, son of Percy, who died in October 2017, aged 96. It was controversially inherited by his son, Oliver Cooper (father of the fashion designer Jade Holland Cooper), and the estate, including 415 acres of land, was listed for sale in June 2018 at £4.65 million.
