= St Mary the Virgin's Church, Stonham Parva =

Coordinates: 52.1991°N 1.0885°E

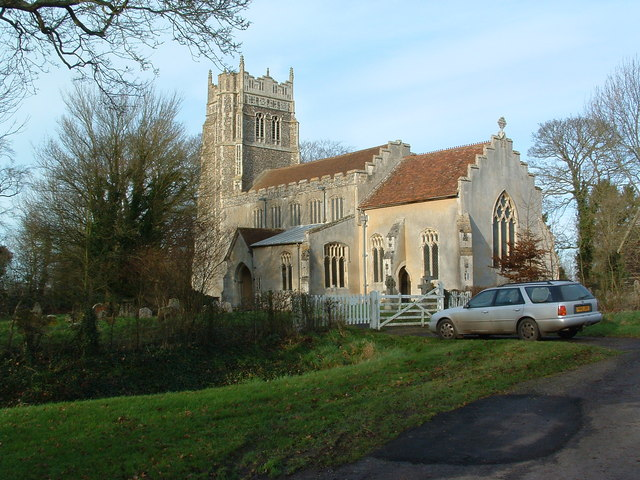
- St Mary the Virgin's Church, Stonham Parva, from the southeast

- Location in Suffolk
- OS grid reference: TM 115 601
- Location: Stonham Parva, Suffolk
- Country: England
- Denomination: Anglican
- Website: Churches Conservation Trust

History
- Dedication: Saint Mary the Virgin

Architecture
- Functional status: Redundant
- Heritage designation: Grade I
- Designated: 9 December 1955
- Architect: E. F. Bishopp (restoration)
- Architectural type: Church
- Style: Gothic

Specifications
- Materials: Plastered rubble with freestone dressings, flint tower

St Mary the Virgin's Church is a redundant Anglican church in the village of Stonham Parva, Suffolk, England. It is recorded in the National Heritage List for England as a designated Grade I listed building, and is under the care of the Churches Conservation Trust. The church is sited 10 miles (16 km) north of Ipswich, to the west of the A140 road.

== History ==
The nave and the chancel of the church date from the 14th century. A major remodelling of the church took place in the early 16th century. It was restored in the 19th century by E. F. Bishopp.

== Architecture ==
=== Exterior ===
The church is constructed mainly in rubble which has been plastered, with freestone dressings. The tower is in unplastered flint rubble. Its plan consists of a nave with a clerestory, a south porch, a south chapel, a chancel, and a west tower. The tower, clerestory and chapel are Perpendicular in style. The tower has a polygonal southeast stair turret. The merlons of the parapet are decorated with flushwork tracery, and below the parapet is a frieze. At the corners are slender pinnacles. The nave has a battlemented parapet, and at the ends of the gables are crow-stepped parapets. The east window is in the style of the 14th century, but is a 19th-century restoration. All the other windows date from the early 16th century.

=== Interior ===
The nave has a double hammerbeam roof in six bays. It contains carved human figures with their heads defaced. The chancel has an arch-braced collar-beam roof, which is decorated with carved angels. On the walls of the chancel are alcoves containing statues of Saint Peter, Saint Paul and the Four Evangelists. Also in the chancel is a piscina dating from the 15th or 16th century. At the west end of the church is a gallery from the early 18th century. The octagonal limestone font dates from the 15th century. Its stem is carved with lions, the bowl with emblems, and supporting the bowl are angels. On the wall of the nave are the Royal Arms of Queen Anne. Also in the nave is a wall tablet to the memory of Gilbert Mouse who died in 1622. It consists of an inscribed slate plate, with an alabaster surround decorated with memento mori images The two-manual organ was made in 1929 by J. Rayson and Son. There is a ring of five bells. The oldest bell was cast in about 1490 in the Bury St Edmunds foundry. The other bells were cast in 1617 by Miles Graye II, in 1729 by Richard Phelps, and in 1816 and 1817 by Thomas Mears II.

== See also ==
- List of churches preserved by the Churches Conservation Trust in the East of England
