= Great Bricett =

Village in Suffolk, England

Coordinates: 52.118°N 0.978°E

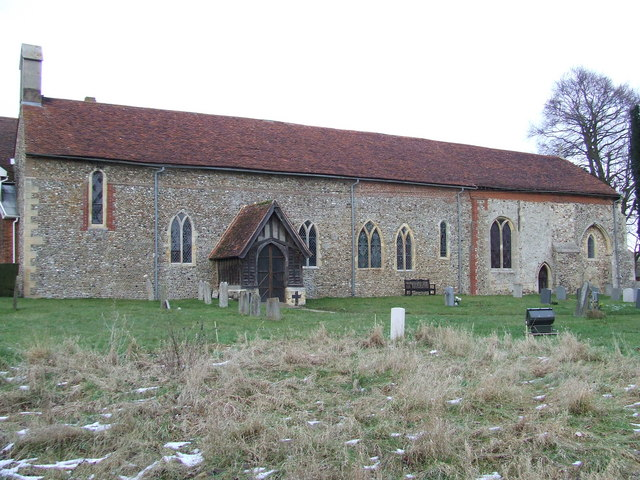
- Church of St Mary & St Laurence

- Location within Suffolk
- Area: 3.77 km^{2} (1.46 sq mi)
- Population: 1,530 (2011)
  - Density: 406/km^{2} (1,050/sq mi)
- OS grid reference: TM040508
- District: Mid Suffolk
- Shire county: Suffolk
- Region: East
- Country: England
- Sovereign state: United Kingdom
- Post town: Ipswich
- Postcode district: IP7
- Police: Suffolk
- Fire: Suffolk
- Ambulance: East of England
- UK Parliament: Central Suffolk and North Ipswich

Great Bricett is a village and civil parish in the county of Suffolk, England. A Tudor spelling of the name was Brisset Magna. At the 2011 census the population was recorded as 1,530. It has strong links with the neighbouring RAF Wattisham which partly falls within the parish boundary.

== Notable residents ==
- Sean Hedges-Quinn (1968- ), sculptor, animator, and film model and prop-maker.

== See also ==
- Great Bricett Hall
- Great Bricett Priory
