= St Margaret's Church, Westhorpe =

Coordinates: 52.1849°N 0.792°E

- Church of Margaret
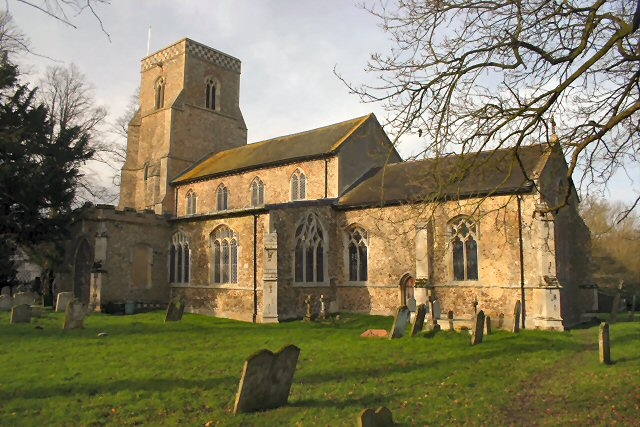
- St Margaret's Church, February 2007

- Location in Suffolk
- OS grid reference: TM 0438 6924
- Location: Westhorpe, Suffolk
- Country: England
- Denomination: Anglican

History
- Dedication: St Margaret

Architecture
- Heritage designation: Grade I
- Designated: 29-Jul-1955
- Architectural type: Church
- Style: Perpendicular Gothic

Specifications
- Materials: Flint rubble with ashlar dressings

St Margaret's Church is the parish church of Westhorpe, Suffolk, England. It is part of the Badwell and Walsham Benefice. It is a Grade I listed building.

== Memorials ==
There are two Barrow memorials dating from the seventeenth century:

- Monument to William Barrow, lawyer and his two wives, Francis Wingfield and Elizabeth Daundy.
- Maurice Barrow (1597/8–1666) son of William and his second wife Elizabeth Daundy.

=== Gallery ===
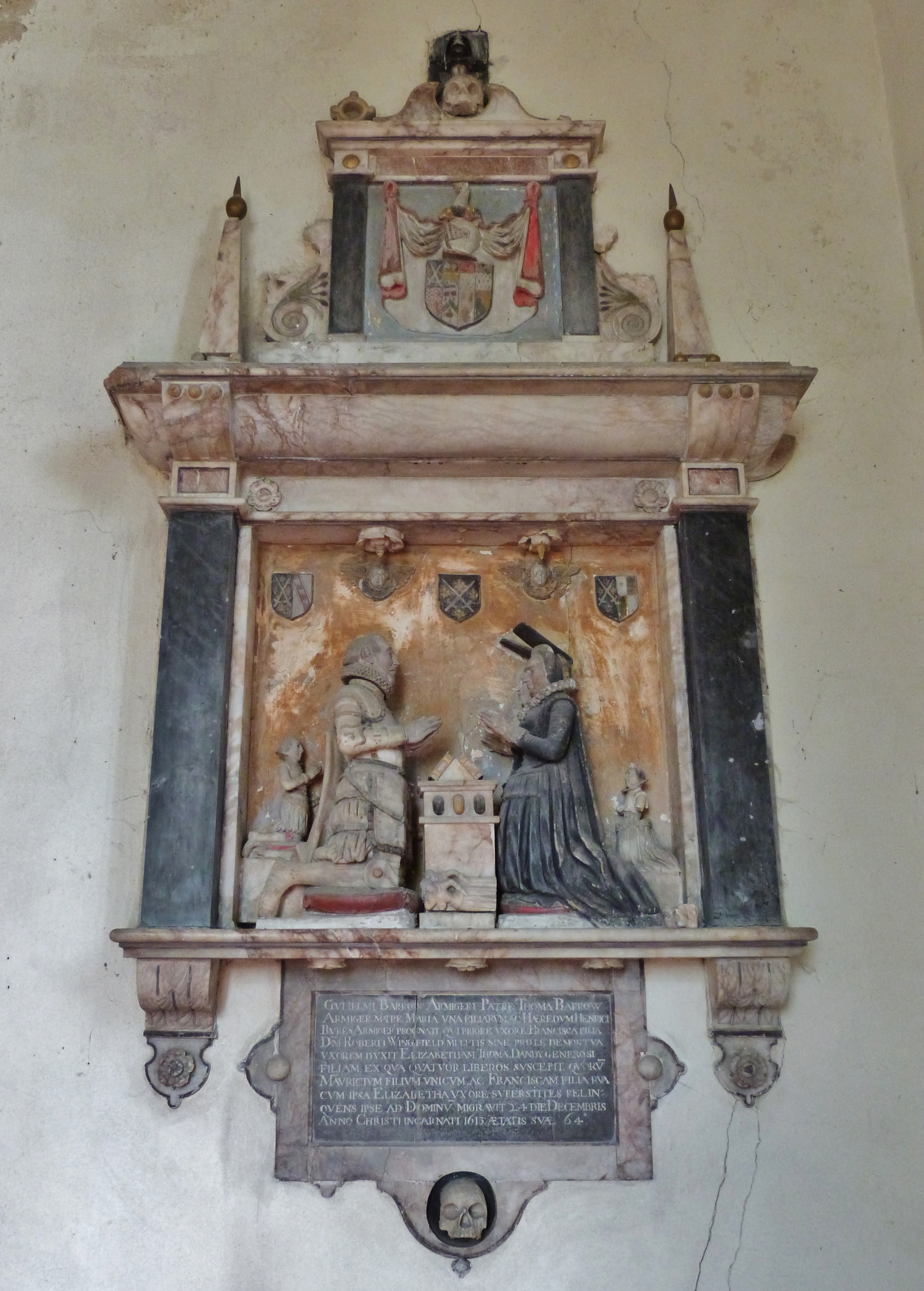
William Barrow memorial
