= Church of St Mary the Virgin, Earl Stonham =

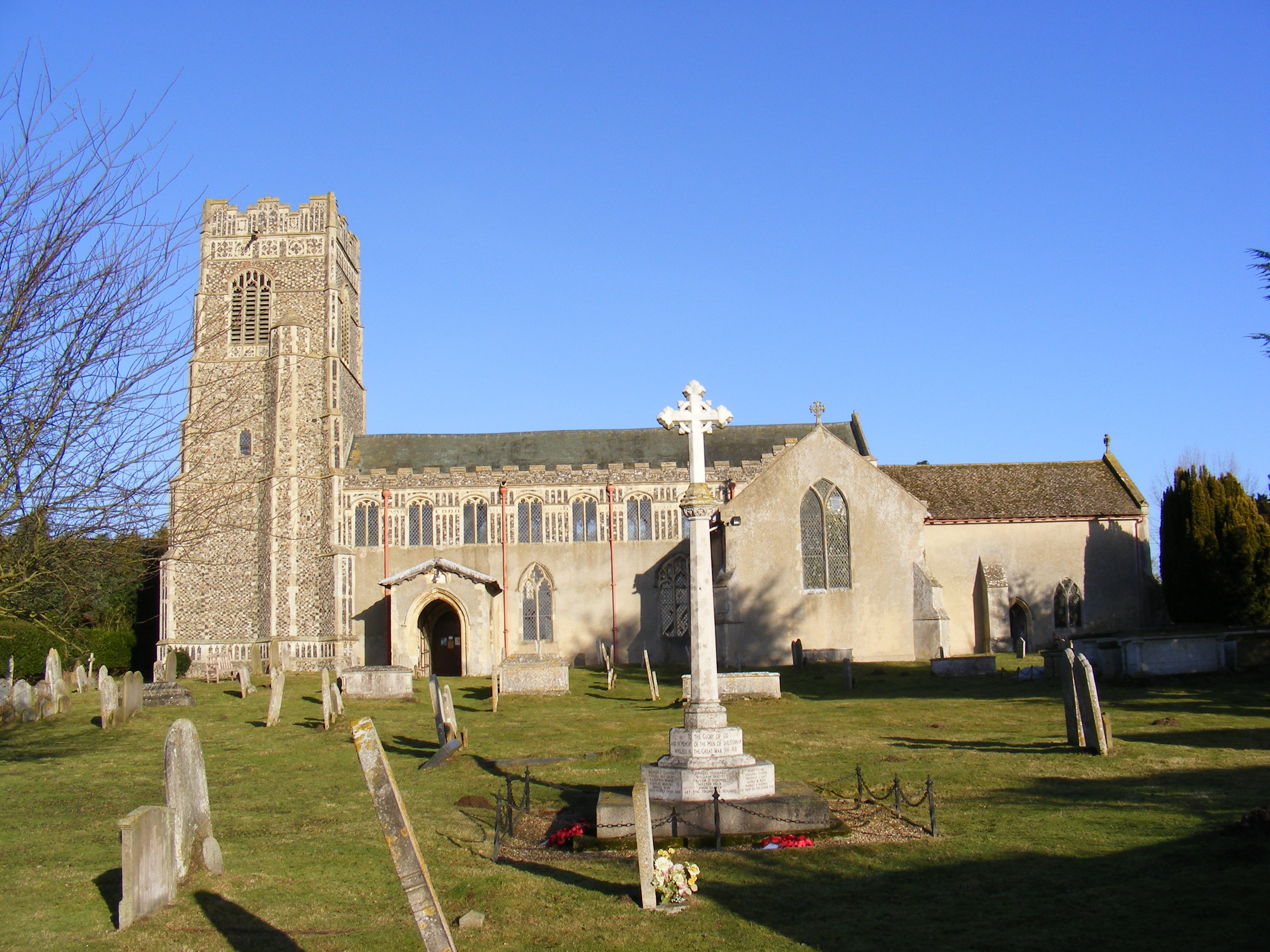
- Church of St Mary the Virgin, Earl Stonham
- 52.18750°N 1.08208°E
- Country: England
- Denomination: Church of England
- Website: www.earlstonham.org.uk/st-marys-church/

History
- Dedication: St Mary the Virgin

Administration
- Province: Province of Canterbury
- Diocese: Diocese of St Edmundsbury and Ipswich
- Deanery: Bosmere
- Parish: Earl Stonham

Listed Building – Grade I
- Official name: Church of St Mary the Virgin
- Designated: 9 December 1955
- Reference no.: 1033223

The Church of St Mary the Virgin, Earl Stonham is a medieval Church of England parish church in the village of Earl Stonham, Suffolk, England. The church is a Grade I listed building and contains fabric dating principally from the 13th century onwards, with substantial later medieval additions and a major Victorian restoration.

== History ==
Evidence suggests that the site of St Mary’s Church may have been of significance before the Norman Conquest. Archaeological finds in the vicinity of the church include Roman cinerary urns, indicating activity in Roman Britain and suggesting that the area may have had ritual or funerary importance prior to the establishment of the medieval settlement. While no Roman structures are known to survive on the site, such finds point to long-standing occupation in the area.

The place-name Stonham is of Old English origin, derived from stān (“stone”) and hām (“homestead” or “village”), indicating an Anglo-Saxon settlement. By the late Anglo-Saxon period, Earl Stonham had developed sufficiently to support a church or church holding. The Domesday Survey of 1086 records a church at Stonham, with shares held by several Saxon landholders, implying an established ecclesiastical presence before the Norman Conquest.

No structural fabric from a pre-Conquest church has been securely identified in the present building. However, documentary and archaeological evidence suggests that the medieval church succeeded an earlier place of worship or sacred site. Surviving fabric indicates that parts of the present chancel may date from the 13th century, with substantial rebuilding of the nave and the addition of transepts and a porch in the mid-14th century.

The west tower dates from about 1500, and a clerestory was added in the early 16th century. The church underwent a significant restoration in 1874, part of a wider Victorian programme of repair affecting many medieval churches in East Anglia.

== Architecture ==
The church is constructed chiefly of flint rubble, much of it plastered, with freestone dressings. It comprises a nave, chancel, north and south transepts, south porch, and west tower. Roofs are variously covered in slate, lead, and tile.

The west tower incorporates flushwork decoration, including traceried panels to the buttresses and parapets. A 14th-century west window is reused above the tower doorway, which retains traceried wooden doors. The clerestory includes additional flushwork ornament between the windows and along the parapets.

== Interior and fittings ==
Historic England describes the nave roof as a particularly fine late medieval timber structure, comprising a ten-bay hammerbeam roof with carved angels and figures in canopied niches. The church contains a 15th-century octagonal limestone font and a pulpit dated to the reign of James II. Late medieval woodwork survives in the seating and choir stalls.

Wall paintings survive within the church, including a painted doom over the chancel arch, though these are fragmentary.

== Parish ==
St Mary’s Church remains an active Church of England parish church and forms part of the North Bosmere Benefice within the Diocese of St Edmundsbury and Ipswich.

== See also ==
- Grade I listed buildings in Suffolk
