= Maurice Barrow (puritan) =

English judicial and social figure

Maurice Barrow (1597/98–1666) was a puritan lawyer and committeeman active in Suffolk during the English Civil War. He was also noted for his exceeding wealth.

Maurice was the son of William Barrow of Westhorpe, Suffolk. and his second wife, Elizabeth Daundy. He attended St John's College, Cambridge matriculating in 1612. He practiced law at Gray's Inn.

He was High Sheriff of Suffolk twice, in 1628 and 1643.

Barrow married Mary Smythe, a daughter of Richard Smythe of Leeds Castle.

== Maurice Barrow monument, Westhorpe ==
There is a sculpture of Maurice in a memorial to him in St Margaret's Church, Westhorpe. Although Barrow died in Barningham, he directed that his body should be buried in Westhorpe, leaving £500 for the building of a tomb.
