= Hemingstone Hall =

Coordinates: 52.140357°N 1.124847°E

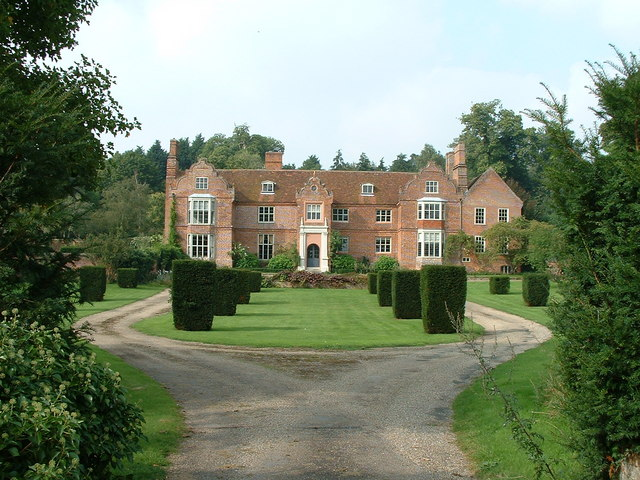
- Hemingstone Hall
- Interactive map of the Hemingstone Hall area

General information
- Architectural style: Jacobean
- Location: Suffolk, England

Design and construction
- Designations: Grade I listed building

Hemingstone Hall is a Jacobean manor house in Hemingstone close to Ipswich in Suffolk, England. It was built in the early 17th Century, around 1625, for William Style. The house is of two storeys with attics, and is built to an H-plan in red brick. James Bettley, in his 2015 revised volume, Suffolk: East, of the Pevsner Buildings of England series, records the two-storey porch with Tuscan pilasters and obelisks.

Hemingstone is a Grade I listed building. It remains a private home and is not open to the public.

== Sources ==
- Bettley, James; Pevsner, Nikolaus (2015) [1961]. Suffolk: East. Buildings of England. New Haven, US and London: Yale University Press. ISBN 978-0300-19654-2. OCLC 1026813176.
