= Hemingstone =

Village in Suffolk, England

Coordinates: 52.140837°N 1.141334°E

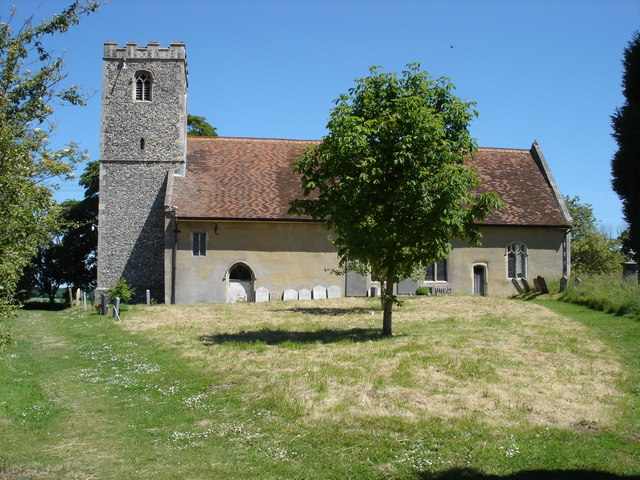
- Church of St Gregory

- Location within Suffolk
- Population: 244 (2011 Census)
- OS grid reference: TM150530
- District: Mid Suffolk
- Shire county: Suffolk
- Region: East
- Country: England
- Sovereign state: United Kingdom
- Post town: Ipswich
- Postcode district: IP6
- Police: Suffolk
- Fire: Suffolk
- Ambulance: East of England

Hemingstone is a village and civil parish in the Mid Suffolk district of Suffolk in eastern England located 6.5 miles (11 km) north of Ipswich. In 2011 the parish had a population of 244.

Hemingstone lies in the hundred of Bosmere. It is a small parish devoted largely to fruit farming with no significant amenities other than the village hall known as "Hemingstone Hut". The residents shop at the adjacent village of Coddenham if they do not choose to go further afield. The largest employer in the village is Stonham Hedgerow, a family business manufacturing jams and preserves.

== History ==
According to the 13th century Liber Feodorum (Book of Fees), the fee tail granted to Roland the Farter for the manor was conditioned on the performance of "unum saltum et siffletum et unum bumbulum" (one jump, one whistle, and one fart) at the king's court every Christmas.

In 1597 the entire parish was cited before a church court for laxity. This may have been the influence of the incumbent manorial lord, Ralph Cantrell, a recusant Catholic.

Hemingstone Hall is a brick-built Jacobean country house built in the early 17th century. It is a Grade I listed building.

The Suffolk folk singer Percy Webb was born in Hemingstone in 1897.

== Parish church ==
The parish church is dedicated to St. Gregory and is Grade I listed. It lies away from the village.
