= Little Stonham =

Village in Suffolk, England

Coordinates: 52.198°N 1.093°E

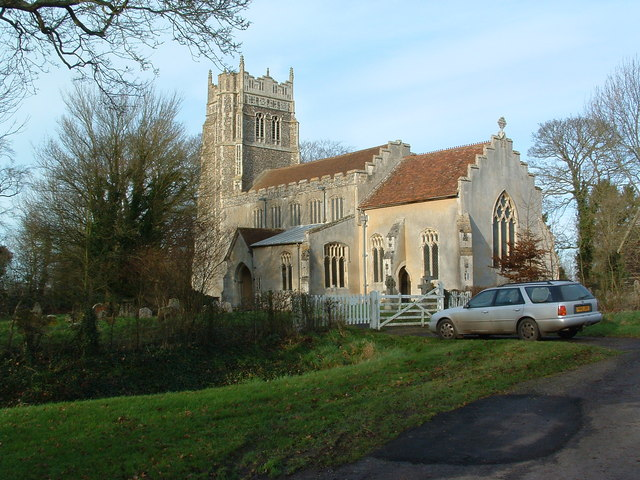
- Church of St Mary

- Location within Suffolk
- Population: 350 (2005); 399 (2011)
- Civil parish: Stonham Parva
- District: Mid Suffolk
- Shire county: Suffolk
- Region: East
- Country: England
- Sovereign state: United Kingdom
- Post town: Stowmarket
- Postcode district: IP14
- Police: Suffolk
- Fire: Suffolk
- Ambulance: East of England

Little Stonham, also known as Stonham Parva, is a village and civil parish in the Mid Suffolk district of Suffolk in eastern England. Located just off the A140, around three miles east of Stowmarket, in 2005 its population was 350.

St Mary the Virgin's Church in the village is a redundant Anglican church. It has been designated by English Heritage as a Grade I listed building, and is under the care of the Churches Conservation Trust.
