= Wortham, Suffolk =

Village in Suffolk, England

Coordinates: 52.35°N 1.05°E

Wortham
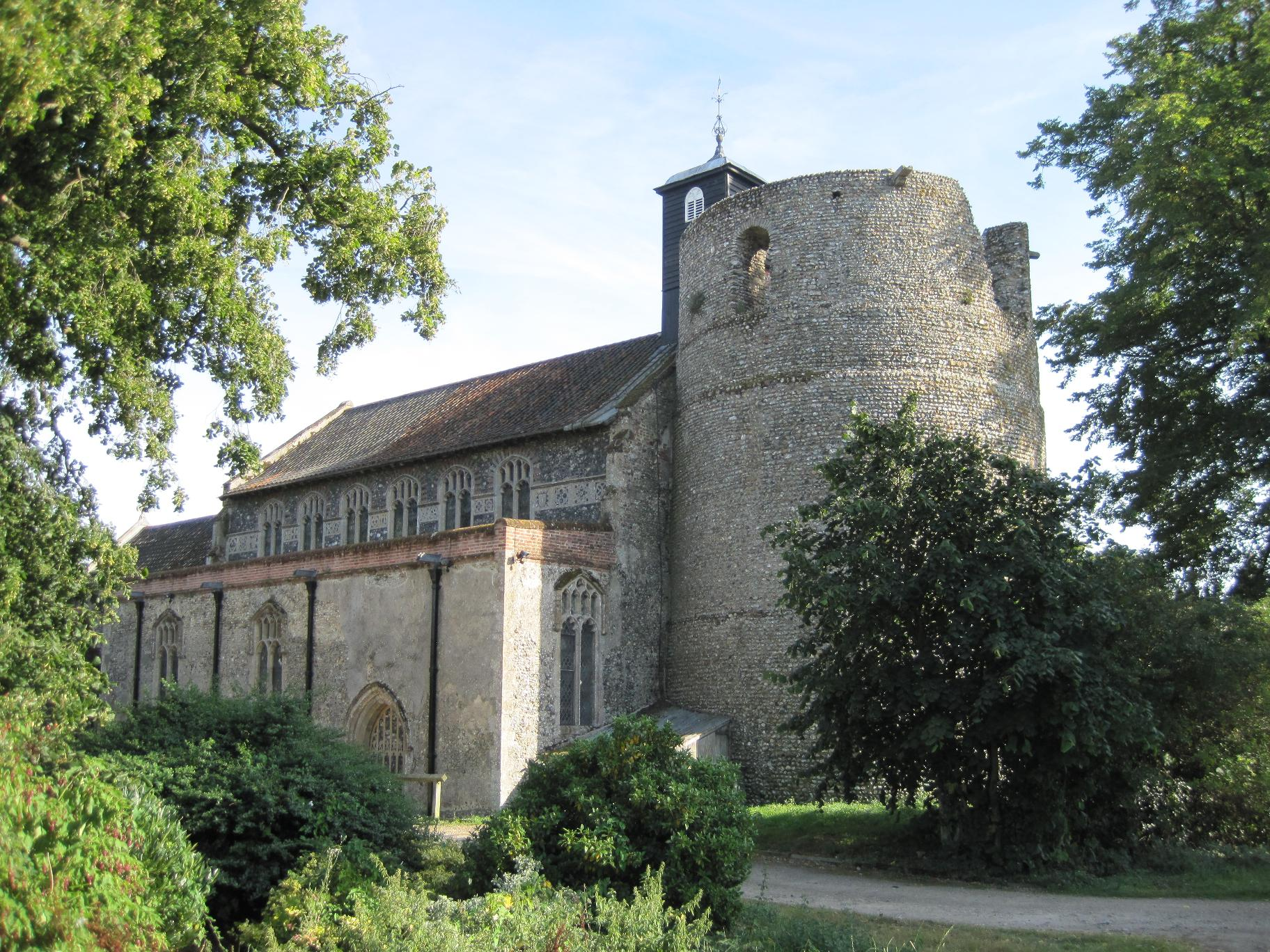
- Wortham, Church of St Mary

- Location within Suffolk
- Population: 722 (2011)
- District: Mid Suffolk
- Shire county: Suffolk
- Region: East
- Country: England
- Sovereign state: United Kingdom
- Post town: Diss
- Postcode district: IP22

Wortham is a village and parish in Suffolk, England, close to the border with Norfolk. Its church, St Mary the Virgin, lies about a mile north of the present-day village. It is one of 38 existing round-tower churches in Suffolk and the one with the greatest diameter in England.

== History ==
In the time of Edward the Confessor Wortham consisted of two parishes, each with its own church and parsonage. They had 40 acres (160,000 m^{2}) of glebe between them and a combined value of seven shillings. After the Norman Conquest there were still two parishes, corresponding to the two Norman manors: Southmoor, held by the Abbots of Bury, and Eastgate (Wortham Hall) held by the Barons of Rye.

In 1769 the parishes were combined under William Evans, Rector of Eastgate. The Saxon church in Southmoor disappeared and was never rebuilt, although the Rectory remained until 1785. A faculty was granted by the Bishop of Norwich to Rowland Holt (Patron) and Henry Patterson (Rector) for "taking down and excusing the rebuilding of one of the parsonages belonging to the Rectory of Wortham Edward w. Jervis annexed." This parsonage was stated to be above a mile from the church and built of stud and clay work and covered with a thatch.

Wortham was the family seat of the Betts family.

The village was home to the author Richard Cobbold between 1825 and 1877. In addition to a famous story of Margaret Catchpole, he published in 1860 The Biography Of A Victorian Village - Wortham, which contains a series of drawings and character details of various members of the community during the mid-Victorian period. This is a useful source for genealogists. The novelist and agricultural writer Doreen Wallace moved to Wortham in 1922 for her married life.

=== 1986 Panavia Tornado crash ===
Panavia Tornado ZA555 crashed on 2 December 1986, east of the village next to the A143, due to an electrical fault, watched by children 400 yards away at Long Green Primary School, also seeing the pilots safely eject. The aircraft flew with the Tornado Weapons Conversion Unit of 45 Squadron. The primary school were invited to the RAF base in July 1987, as a goodwill gesture.

== Geography ==
The local public house is The Manor House. Wortham Ling is to the north.

== Public transport ==
Diss (4 miles/6.4 km) has the nearest railway station. The village is served by infrequent daytime, Monday-to-Saturday bus services to Bury St Edmunds and Diss.
