= Mendlesham =

Village in Suffolk, England

Coordinates: 52.25°N 1.08°E

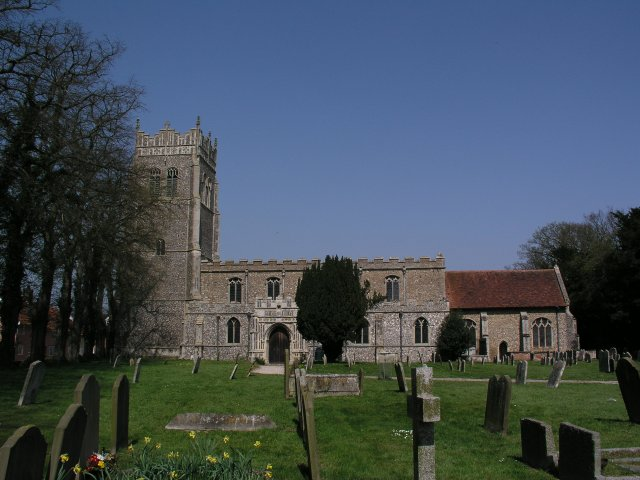
- Church of St Mary

- Location within Suffolk
- Population: 1,569 (2024)
- OS grid reference: TM104658
  - London: 73.135 mi (117.699 km)
- District: Mid Suffolk
- Shire county: Suffolk
- Region: East
- Country: England
- Sovereign state: United Kingdom
- Post town: Stowmarket
- Postcode district: IP14
- Dialling code: 01449
- Police: Suffolk
- Fire: Suffolk
- Ambulance: East of England
- UK Parliament: Waveney Valley
- Website: One Suffolk

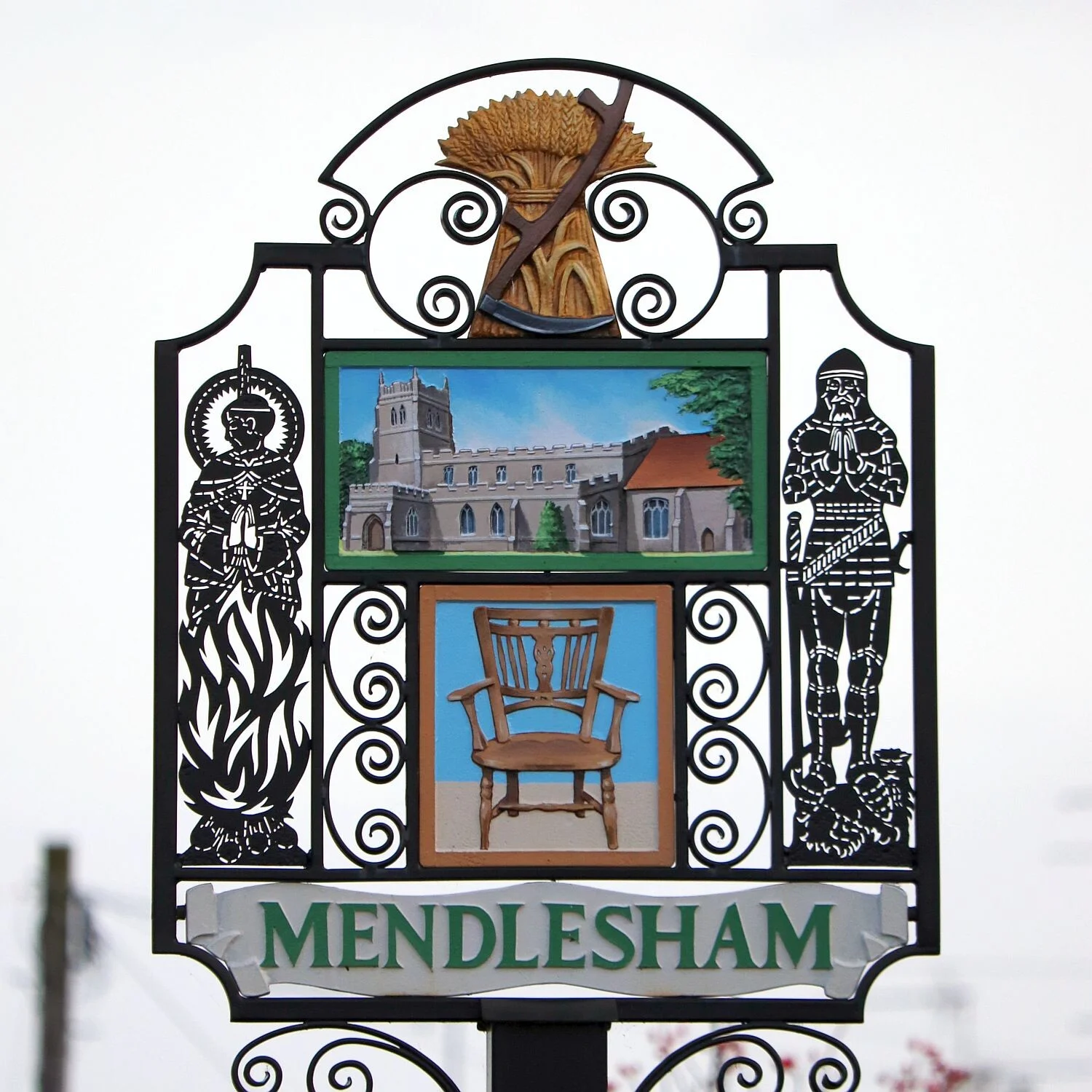
Mendlesham Village Sign

Mendlesham is a village in Suffolk with 1,569 inhabitants as of 2024. It lies 5 miles (8 km) north east of Stowmarket and 73.135 miles (117.699 km) from London.

The place-name 'Mendlesham' is first attested in the Domesday Book of 1086, where it appears as Melnesham and Mundlesham. The name means 'Myndel's village'.

Mendlesham is known for its large street fair which is held on every May Day bank holiday. Mendlesham has a popular community newsletter, and a good primary school. There is one public house in the village called 'The King's Head'; though previously a second public house, 'The Fleece Inn' was open at the western end of Front Street, where it meets Old Station Road. The building once containing The Fleece is now a residential property. The village has a fish and chip shop and Mendlesham Bakery, a 'Premier Stores' convenience store with a Post Office counter..

Nearby at grid reference TM123640 is the Mendlesham transmitting station which broadcasts Kiss 105-108 (previously Vibe FM) on 106.4 MHz and the Digital One digital radio multiplex, and which was formerly used for VHF 405 line transmissions of Anglia Television. The mast stands at the corner of the former WWII airfield, RAF Mendlesham. This was used by the RAF and US Eighth Air Force between 1943 and 1955, and once held a memorial to the US 34th Bomb Group. The memorial has now been moved to the churchyard of St. Mary's in Mendlesham. Although some of the land has reverted to agriculture or is an industrial estate, one airstrip is now used by the Suffolk Coastal Floaters Hang Gliding Club.

There are two churches in the village, a small URC chapel and the grand medieval church of St Mary the Virgin, built at a time when the village had a much larger population, as well as a Baptist chapel in Mendlesham Green. Unlike many Anglican churches today, there is a mass (Communion) service held every day at St Mary's.

In 1531, the Mendlesham Christian Brethren were a group of Protestant dissenters, and two decades later, Adam Foster became a Marian martyr, after he refused to attend a Roman Catholic mass. He was condemned to be burnt at the stake by John Hopton, the Bishop of Norwich.

Mendlesham had the second station on the Mid-Suffolk Light Railway, which ran from 1904 to 1952.

Mendlesham Manor is an Elizabethan Manor House.

Close to Mendlesham is the hamlet of Mendlesham Green, which contains Mendlesham Green Baptist Church.

The village was struck by an F0/T1 tornado on 23 November 1981, as part of the record-breaking nationwide tornado outbreak on that day.

== See also ==
Foxe's Book of Martyrs
