= John Wentworth (died 1651) =

English politician (1578 - 1651)

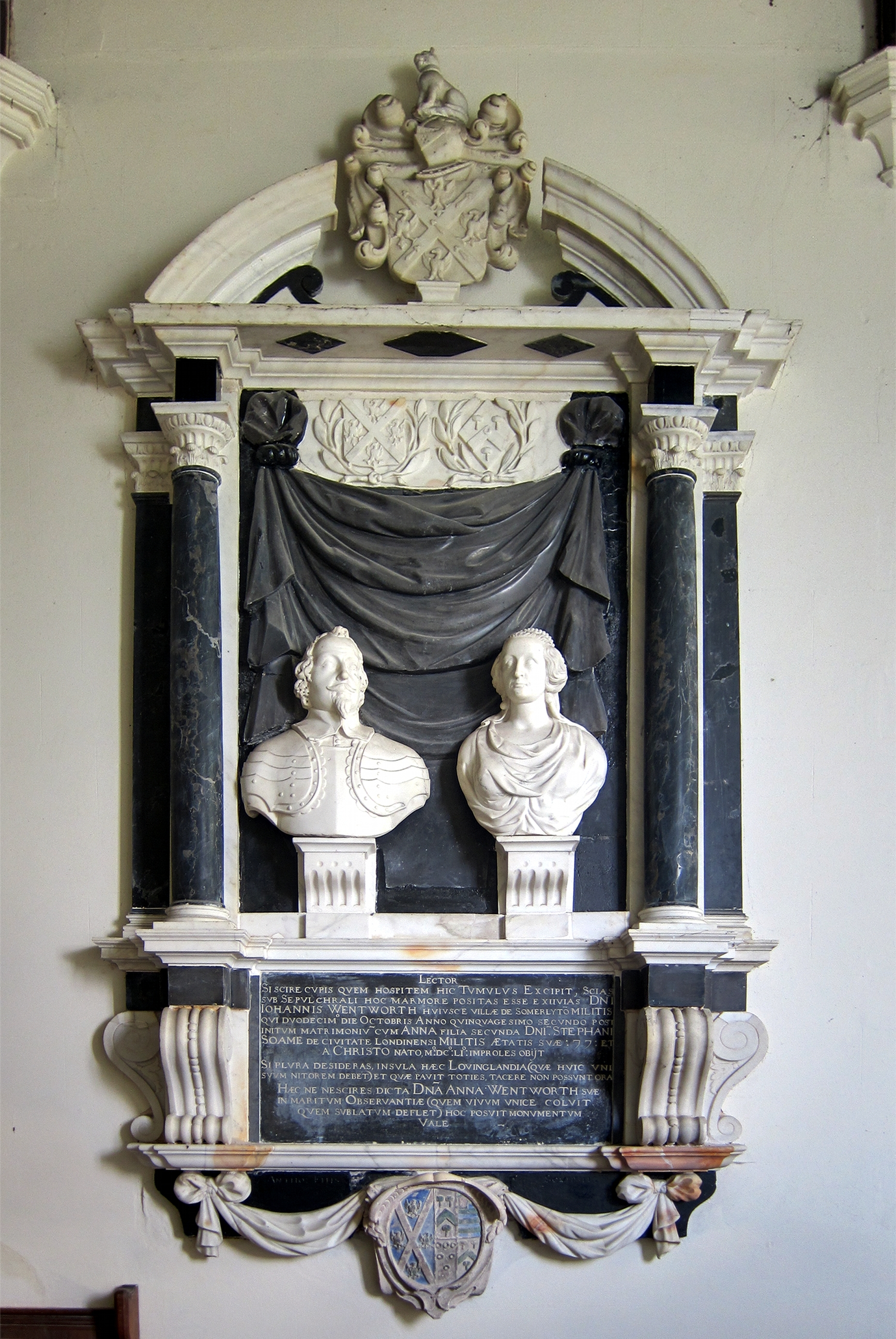
Monument to John Wentworth and his wife Anne Soame, St Mary's Church, Somerleyton

John Wentworth (1578 - 1651) of Somerleyton was an English politician. He was High Sheriff of Suffolk in 1619 and the Member of Parliament for Great Yarmouth in 1628.

John was the only son of John Wentworth of Darsham, Suffolk and his Elizabeth, daughter of John Southwell of Barrow Hall, Suffolk.

Parliament of England
Preceded by Thomas Johnson; Sir John Corbet	Member of Parliament for Great Yarmouth; 1628–1629; With: Sir John Corbet	Parliament suspended until 1640
