= Listed buildings in Mid Suffolk District =

Historic structures in Mid Suffolk, England

There are around 3,400 listed buildings in the Mid Suffolk District, which are buildings of architectural or historic interest.

- Grade I buildings are of exceptional interest.
- Grade II* buildings are particularly important buildings of more than special interest.
- Grade II buildings are of special interest.

The lists follow Historic England’s geographical organisation, with entries grouped by county, local authority, and parish (civil and non-civil). The following lists are arranged by parish.

Parish	List of listed buildings	Grade I	Grade II*	Grade II	Total
Akenham	Listed buildings in Akenham				4
Ashbocking	Listed buildings in Ashbocking				8
Ashfield cum Thorpe	Listed buildings in Ashfield cum Thorpe				14
Aspall	Listed buildings in Aspall, Suffolk				11
Athelington	Listed buildings in Athelington				6
Bacton	Listed buildings in Bacton, Suffolk				39
Badley	Listed buildings in Badley				12
Badwell Ash	Listed buildings in Badwell Ash				18
Barham	Listed buildings in Barham, Suffolk				34
Barking	Listed buildings in Barking, Suffolk				25
Battisford	Listed buildings in Battisford				24
Baylham	Listed buildings in Baylham				20
Bedfield	Listed buildings in Bedfield				23
Bedingfield	Listed buildings in Bedingfield, Suffolk				16
Beyton	Listed buildings in Beyton				20
Botesdale	Listed buildings in Botesdale				39
Braiseworth	Listed buildings in Braiseworth				15
Bramford	Listed buildings in Bramford				33
Brome and Oakley	Listed buildings in Brome and Oakley				40
Brundish	Listed buildings in Brundish				16
Burgate	Listed buildings in Burgate				17
Buxhall	Listed buildings in Buxhall				34
Claydon	Listed buildings in Claydon, Suffolk				16
Coddenham	Listed buildings in Coddenham				51
Combs	Listed buildings in Combs, Suffolk				49
Cotton	Listed buildings in Cotton, Suffolk				16
Creeting St Mary	Listed buildings in Creeting St Mary				25
Creeting St Peter	Listed buildings in Creeting St Peter				12
Crowfield	Listed buildings in Crowfield, Suffolk				16
Darmsden	Listed buildings in Darmsden				10
Debenham	Listed buildings in Debenham				95
Denham	Listed buildings in Denham, Mid Suffolk				12
Drinkstone	Listed buildings in Drinkstone				36
Earl Stonham	Listed buildings in Earl Stonham				45
Elmswell	Listed buildings in Elmswell				22
Eye (town)	Listed buildings in Eye, Suffolk				166
Felsham	Listed buildings in Felsham				26
Finningham	Listed buildings in Finningham				28
Flowton	Listed buildings in Flowton				5
Framsden	Listed buildings in Framsden				47
Fressingfield	Listed buildings in Fressingfield				58
Gedding	Listed buildings in Gedding				6
Gipping	Listed buildings in Gipping				12
Gislingham	Listed buildings in Gislingham				39
Gosbeck	Listed buildings in Gosbeck				17
Great Ashfield	Listed buildings in Great Ashfield				22
Great Blakenham	Listed buildings in Great Blakenham				8
Great Bricett	Listed buildings in Great Bricett				6
Great Finborough	Listed buildings in Great Finborough				20
Harleston	Listed buildings in Harleston, Suffolk				10
Haughley	Listed buildings in Haughley				64
Helmingham	Listed buildings in Helmingham				47
Hemingstone	Listed buildings in Hemingstone				19
Henley	Listed buildings in Henley, Suffolk				10
Hessett	Listed buildings in Hessett				19
Hinderclay	Listed buildings in Hinderclay				20
Horham	Listed buildings in Horham				24
Hoxne	Listed buildings in Hoxne				76
Hunston	Listed buildings in Hunston, Suffolk				13
Kenton	Listed buildings in Kenton, Suffolk				15
Langham	Listed buildings in Langham, Suffolk				11
Laxfield	Listed buildings in Laxfield				58
Little Blakenham	Listed buildings in Little Blakenham				8
Little Finborough	Listed buildings in Little Finborough				4
Mellis	Listed buildings in Mellis				32
Mendham	Listed buildings in Mendham, Suffolk				33
Mendlesham	Listed buildings in Mendlesham				45
Metfield	Listed buildings in Metfield				27
Mickfield	Listed buildings in Mickfield				13
Monk Soham	Listed buildings in Monk Soham				20
Needham Market (town)	Listed buildings in Needham Market				101
Nettlestead	Listed buildings in Nettlestead, Suffolk				11
Norton	Listed buildings in Norton, Suffolk				35
Occold	Listed buildings in Occold				17
Offton	Listed buildings in Offton				18
Old Newton with Dagworth	Listed buildings in Old Newton with Dagworth				40
Onehouse	Listed buildings in Onehouse				25
Palgrave	Listed buildings in Palgrave, Suffolk				42
Pettaugh	Listed buildings in Pettaugh				5
Rattlesden	Listed buildings in Rattlesden				59
Redgrave	Listed buildings in Redgrave, Suffolk				48
Redlingfield	Listed buildings in Redlingfield				8
Rickinghall Inferior	Listed buildings in Rickinghall Inferior				30
Rickinghall Superior	Listed buildings in Rickinghall Superior				33
Ringshall	Listed buildings in Ringshall, Suffolk				14
Rishangles	Listed buildings in Rishangles				14
Shelland	Listed buildings in Shelland				8
Somersham	Listed buildings in Somersham, Suffolk				9
Southolt	Listed buildings in Southolt				11
Stoke Ash	Listed buildings in Stoke Ash				16
Stonham Aspal	Listed buildings in Stonham Aspal				46
Stonham Parva	Listed buildings in Stonham Parva				20
Stowlangtoft	Listed buildings in Stowlangtoft				12
Stowmarket (town)	Listed buildings in Stowmarket				132
Stowupland	Listed buildings in Stowupland				37
Stradbroke	Listed buildings in Stradbroke				70
Stuston	Listed buildings in Stuston				17
Syleham	Listed buildings in Syleham				13
Tannington	Listed buildings in Tannington				8
Thorndon	Listed buildings in Thorndon, Suffolk				35
Thornham Magna	Listed buildings in Thornham Magna				29
Thornham Parva	Listed buildings in Thornham Parva				8
Thrandeston	Listed buildings in Thrandeston				26
Thurston	Listed buildings in Thurston, Suffolk				25
Thwaite	Listed buildings in Thwaite, Suffolk				7
Tostock	Listed buildings in Tostock				16
Walsham-le-Willows	Listed buildings in Walsham-le-Willows				66
Wattisfield	Listed buildings in Wattisfield				30
Westhorpe	Listed buildings in Westhorpe, Suffolk				22
Wetherden	Listed buildings in Wetherden				35
Wetheringsett-cum-Brockford	Listed buildings in Wetheringsett-cum-Brockford				53
Weybread	Listed buildings in Weybread				18
Wickham Skeith	Listed buildings in Wickham Skeith				18
Wilby	Listed buildings in Wilby, Suffolk				31
Willisham	Listed buildings in Willisham				3
Wingfield	Listed buildings in Wingfield, Suffolk				30
Winston	Listed buildings in Winston, Suffolk				22
Woolpit	Listed buildings in Woolpit				61
Worlingworth	Listed buildings in Worlingworth				36
Wortham	Listed buildings in Wortham, Suffolk				58
Wyverstone	Listed buildings in Wyverstone				21
Yaxley	Listed buildings in Yaxley, Suffolk				20

== See also ==
- Grade I listed buildings in Suffolk
- Grade II* listed buildings in Suffolk

== Sources ==
- Bettely, James; Pevsner, Nikolaus (2015) [1961], Suffolk: East, The Buildings of England, New Haven and London: Yale University Press, ISBN 978-0-300-19654-2
- Bettely, James; Pevsner, Nikolaus (2015) [1961], Suffolk: West, The Buildings of England, New Haven and London: Yale University Press, ISBN 978-0-300-19655-9
