= Listed buildings in Haughley =

Historic structures in Suffolk, England

Haughley is a village and civil parish in the Mid Suffolk District of Suffolk, England. It contains 64 listed buildings that are recorded in the National Heritage List for England. Of these two are grade I, one is grade II* and 61 are grade II.

This list is based on the information retrieved online from Historic England.

== Key ==
Grade	Criteria
I	Buildings that are of exceptional interest
II*	Particularly important buildings of more than special interest
II	Buildings that are of special interest

== Listing ==
Name	Grade	Location	Type	Completed (Note: The date given is the date used by Historic England as significant for the initial building or that of an important part in the structure's description.)	Date designated	Grid ref. (Note: The grid reference is based on the British national grid reference system, sometimes known as OSGB36, used by the Ordnance Survey.) Geo-coordinates	Notes	Entry number (Note: The "List Entry Number" is a unique number assigned to each listed building and scheduled monument by Historic England.)	Image	Wikidata
Tot Hill House	II	A45			15 March 1988	TM0341860820; 52°12′29″N 0°58′33″E		1352282	Upload Photo	Q26635314
Old Hall	II	Bacton Road			15 March 1988	TM0317064906; 52°14′41″N 0°58′28″E		1352302	Upload Photo	Q26635334
Rookery Farmhouse	II	Bacton Road			15 March 1988	TM0325064585; 52°14′31″N 0°58′32″E		1181016	Upload Photo	Q26476361
Aukland House	II	Dagworth			15 March 1988	TM0400661374; 52°12′46″N 0°59′05″E		1032692	Upload Photo	Q26284117
Sorrels House	II	Dagworth			9 December 1955	TM0413561087; 52°12′37″N 0°59′11″E		1032693	Upload Photo	Q26284118
1, Duke Street	II	1, Duke Street			15 March 1988	TM0265562282; 52°13′17″N 0°57′56″E		1352303	Upload Photo	Q26635335
3, Duke Street	II	3, Duke Street			15 March 1988	TM0264562277; 52°13′17″N 0°57′55″E		1032694	Upload Photo	Q26284119
13 and 14, Duke Street	II	13 and 14, Duke Street			15 March 1988	TM0252562312; 52°13′18″N 0°57′49″E		1352306	Upload Photo	Q26635337
18 and 19, Duke Street	II	18 and 19, Duke Street			15 March 1988	TM0248962326; 52°13′19″N 0°57′47″E		1032697	Upload Photo	Q26284123
The Old Moat House	II	20, Duke Street			15 March 1988	TM0247862332; 52°13′19″N 0°57′46″E		1032696	Upload Photo	Q26284122
Barn, 80 Metres North West of Castle Farmhouse	II	80 Metres North West Of Castle Farmhouse, Duke Street			15 March 1988	TM0249762462; 52°13′23″N 0°57′48″E		1352305	Upload Photo	Q26635336
Church of St Mary the Virgin	I	Duke Street	church building		9 December 1955	TM0261262307; 52°13′18″N 0°57′53″E		1352304	Church of St Mary the Virgin More images	Q17526437
Haughley War Memorial	II	Duke Street, IP14 3QS			12 March 2020	TM0261362280; 52°13′17″N 0°57′53″E		1469249	Upload Photo	Q97452260
The Grange	II	Duke Street			9 December 1955	TM0256562322; 52°13′19″N 0°57′51″E		1032695	Upload Photo	Q26284121
Unoccupied House, 50 Metres South of Old Hall Cottage	II	50 Metres South Of Old Hall Cottage, Fir Tree Lane			15 March 1988	TM0289964496; 52°14′28″N 0°58′13″E		1352307	Upload Photo	Q26635338
Old Hall Cottage	II	Fir Tree Lane, Haugley Green			15 March 1988	TM0291664550; 52°14′30″N 0°58′14″E		1181158	Upload Photo	Q26476496
Pond Cottage and Sussex Cottage	II	Fir Tree Lane, Haughley Green			15 March 1988	TM0285564261; 52°14′21″N 0°58′10″E		1032698	Upload Photo	Q26284124
Shrub Farmhouse	II	Fir Tree Lane, Haughley Green			15 March 1988	TM0286764355; 52°14′24″N 0°58′11″E		1181133	Upload Photo	Q26476473
The Firs	II	Fishponds Way			9 December 1955	TM0289161986; 52°13′07″N 0°58′07″E		1032699	Upload Photo	Q26284125
Conference Centre, Formerly Barn and Stable, 100 Metres South East of Haughley Park House	II	Formerly Barn And Stable, 100 Metres South East Of Haughley Park House, Haughley Park			15 March 1988	TM0052961833; 52°13′06″N 0°56′03″E		1032704	Upload Photo	Q26284131
Mere Farm Cottages	II	1 and 2, Green Road			15 March 1988	TM0287663006; 52°13′40″N 0°58′09″E		1181214	Upload Photo	Q26476548
Mere Close Farm	II	Green Road, IP14 3RA			15 March 1988	TM0287262880; 52°13′36″N 0°58′08″E		1032702	Upload Photo	Q26284129
Haugh Farmhouse	II	Haugh Lane			15 March 1988	TM0378162913; 52°13′36″N 0°58′56″E		1285087	Upload Photo	Q26573806
Haughley Park and Attached Garden Walls on Three Sides	I	Haughley Park	architectural structure		9 December 1955	TM0044161905; 52°13′08″N 0°55′58″E		1181268	Haughley Park and Attached Garden Walls on Three Sides More images	Q17526189
Walnut Tree Manor	II	Haugley Green			9 December 1955	TM0302863977; 52°14′12″N 0°58′19″E		1032703	Upload Photo	Q26284130
Barn 60 Metres South West of New Bells Farmhouse	II	New Bells Road, Haughley Green			15 March 1988	TM0346064044; 52°14′13″N 0°58′42″E		1181369	Upload Photo	Q26476692
New Bells Cottage	II	New Bells Road, Haugley Green			15 March 1988	TM0306664222; 52°14′19″N 0°58′21″E		1181327	Upload Photo	Q26476653
New Bells Farmhouse	II*	New Bells Road, Haughley Green			9 December 1955	TM0352964072; 52°14′14″N 0°58′46″E		1032705	Upload Photo	Q17535580
Wassicks Farmhouse	II	New Bells Road, Haughley Green			15 March 1988	TM0395164110; 52°14′15″N 0°59′08″E		1032706	Upload Photo	Q26284132
Bridge Farmhouse	II	New Street			15 March 1988	TM0118362057; 52°13′12″N 0°56′38″E		1032707	Upload Photo	Q26284133
Haughley Bushes	II	New Street			15 March 1988	TM0108960930; 52°12′36″N 0°56′30″E		1285013	Upload Photo	Q26573740
One Acre	II	New Street			15 March 1988	TM0123661954; 52°13′08″N 0°56′40″E		1285038	Upload Photo	Q26573763
The White Horse Inn	II	New Street			15 March 1988	TM0126861974; 52°13′09″N 0°56′42″E		1352308	Upload Photo	Q26635339
Dial Farm Cottage	II	18, Old Street			15 March 1988	TM0271562153; 52°13′13″N 0°57′59″E		1032671	Upload Photo	Q26284093
Dial Farm Cottage	II	20 And Part Of 18, Old Street			15 March 1988	TM0272362150; 52°13′13″N 0°57′59″E		1352331	Upload Photo	Q26685461
22 and 24, Old Street	II	22 and 24, Old Street			15 March 1988	TM0273862138; 52°13′12″N 0°58′00″E		1284979	Upload Photo	Q26573708
Chilton House and Mulbra House	II	32, Old Street			9 December 1955	TM0277462121; 52°13′12″N 0°58′02″E		1352312	Upload Photo	Q26635343
Walnut Tree Cottages	II	35 and 37, Old Street			9 December 1955	TM0275762176; 52°13′14″N 0°58′01″E		1284990	Upload Photo	Q26573718
39 and 41, Old Street	II	39 and 41, Old Street, IP14 3NT			15 March 1988	TM0277462163; 52°13′13″N 0°58′02″E		1352310	Upload Photo	Q26635341
Fish and Chips and Video Shop	II	43 and 45, Old Street			15 March 1988	TM0279462143; 52°13′13″N 0°58′03″E		1181473	Upload Photo	Q26476792
44 (part), 46 and 48, Old Street	II	44 (part), 46 and 48, Old Street			15 March 1988	TM0281762094; 52°13′11″N 0°58′04″E		1032711	Upload Photo	Q26284138
47, Old Street	II	47, Old Street			15 March 1988	TM0279762138; 52°13′12″N 0°58′03″E		1032709	Upload Photo	Q26284135
51, 53, and 55, Old Street	II	51, 53, And 55, Old Street			9 December 1955	TM0281062128; 52°13′12″N 0°58′03″E		1181483	Upload Photo	Q26476802
57 and 59 (part), Old Street	II	57 and 59 (part), Old Street			9 December 1955	TM0282562114; 52°13′12″N 0°58′04″E		1032710	Upload Photo	Q26284136
58, Old Street	II	58, Old Street			15 March 1988	TM0284762073; 52°13′10″N 0°58′05″E		1284972	Upload Photo	Q26573701
Old Thatch	II	59 (part) And 61, Old Street			9 December 1955	TM0283462109; 52°13′11″N 0°58′05″E		1181494	Upload Photo	Q26476812
Antrim House and the Old Counting House	II	Old Street, Stowmarket, IP14 3NR			9 December 1955	TM0264662236; 52°13′16″N 0°57′55″E		1181191	Upload Photo	Q26476526
Dial Farmhouse`	II	Old Street			9 December 1955	TM0270662155; 52°13′13″N 0°57′58″E		1032672	Upload Photo	Q26284094
Franklins (newsagent) and Beam Ends	II	Old Street			9 December 1955	TM0287062088; 52°13′11″N 0°58′07″E		1352311	Upload Photo	Q26635342
The Glebe	II	Old Street			9 December 1955	TM0267562272; 52°13′17″N 0°57′57″E		1352309	Upload Photo	Q26635340
The Kings Arms Public House	II	Old Street	pub		9 December 1955	TM0267862260; 52°13′16″N 0°57′57″E		1284984	The Kings Arms Public House More images	Q26573713
The Old Forge	II	Old Street			15 March 1988	TM0273862213; 52°13′15″N 0°58′00″E		1032708	Upload Photo	Q26284134
Coach House and Stables 70 Metres North of Plashwood House	II	Plashwood Road			15 March 1988	TM0179862540; 52°13′27″N 0°57′11″E		1352332	Upload Photo	Q26635361
Shepherds Farmhouse	II	Shepherds Lane			15 March 1988	TM0342259968; 52°12′01″N 0°58′31″E		1032673	Upload Photo	Q26284096
Hill Farmhouse	II	Station Road			15 March 1988	TM0318762070; 52°13′10″N 0°58′23″E		1352333	Upload Photo	Q26635362
Numbers 6 and 7 Duke Street and Numbers 2 (the Post Office) and 4 the Green	II	4, The Green			15 March 1988	TM0264762257; 52°13′16″N 0°57′55″E		1181114	Upload Photo	Q26476455
Former Parish Coalhouse	II	The Green			25 February 1994	TM0269362207; 52°13′15″N 0°57′58″E		1246875	Upload Photo	Q26539240
Haughley House	II	The Green			9 December 1955	TM0261262165; 52°13′13″N 0°57′53″E		1181171	Upload Photo	Q26476507
Palmers Bakers and Confectioners Shop	II	The Green			15 March 1988	TM0267462230; 52°13′16″N 0°57′57″E		1032701	Upload Photo	Q26284127
The White House	II	The Green			15 March 1988	TM0263762209; 52°13′15″N 0°57′55″E		1032700	Upload Photo	Q26284126
Stable, Aligned North South 15 Metres North East of Green Farmhouse	II	Aligned North South 15 Metres North East Of Green Farmhouse, Wetherden Road, Haughley Green			15 March 1988	TM0264763544; 52°13′58″N 0°57′58″E		1352294	Upload Photo	Q26635326
House, 200 Metres West South West of Green Farmhouse	II	200 Metres West South West Of Green Farmhouse, Wetherden Road, Haughley Green			15 March 1988	TM0243063471; 52°13′56″N 0°57′46″E		1032675	Upload Photo	Q26284098
Green Farmhouse	II	Wetherden Road, Haughley Green			15 March 1988	TM0263763523; 52°13′57″N 0°57′57″E		1032674	Upload Photo	Q26284097
Laurel Farmhouse	II	Wetherden Road, Haughley Green			15 March 1988	TM0270263714; 52°14′03″N 0°58′01″E		1032676	Upload Photo	Q26284099

== See also ==
- Grade I listed buildings in Suffolk
- Grade II* listed buildings in Suffolk

== Sources ==
- Bettely, James; Pevsner, Nikolaus (2015) [1961], Suffolk: West, The Buildings of England, New Haven and London: Yale University Press, ISBN 978-0-300-19655-9
