= Listed buildings in Laxfield =

Historic structures in Suffolk, England

Laxfield is a village and civil parish in the Mid Suffolk District of Suffolk, England. It contains 58 listed buildings that are recorded in the National Heritage List for England. Of these one is grade I, four are grade II* and 53 are grade II.

This list is based on the information retrieved online from Historic England.

== Key ==
Grade	Criteria
I	Buildings that are of exceptional interest
II*	Particularly important buildings of more than special interest
II	Buildings that are of special interest

== Listing ==
Name	Grade	Location	Type	Completed (Note: The date given is the date used by Historic England as significant for the initial building or that of an important part in the structure's description.)	Date designated	Grid ref. (Note: The grid reference is based on the British national grid reference system, sometimes known as OSGB36, used by the Ordnance Survey.) Geo-coordinates	Notes	Entry number (Note: The "List Entry Number" is a unique number assigned to each listed building and scheduled monument by Historic England.)	Image	Wikidata
Blue House Farmhouse	II				18 December 1987	TM2731473066; 52°18′31″N 1°19′59″E		1032865	Upload Photo	Q26284305
Boats Hall	II				29 July 1955	TM3143870915; 52°17′15″N 1°23′31″E		1352227	Upload Photo	Q26635261
Gatehouse Farmhouse	II				18 December 1987	TM2728472588; 52°18′16″N 1°19′56″E		1032866	Upload Photo	Q26284307
Noyes Farmhouse	II				18 December 1987	TM3014771536; 52°17′37″N 1°22′25″E		1032867	Upload Photo	Q26284308
Sancroft Cottage	II				18 December 1987	TM2735172407; 52°18′10″N 1°20′00″E		1180701	Upload Photo	Q26476007
Sancroft Manor Farmhouse	II				18 December 1987	TM2735872359; 52°18′08″N 1°20′00″E		1352229	Upload Photo	Q26635263
St Jacob's Hall	II				29 July 1955	TM3064471308; 52°17′29″N 1°22′50″E		1032868	Upload Photo	Q26284309
Street Farmhouse	II				18 December 1987	TM2943471877; 52°17′49″N 1°21′48″E		1180707	Upload Photo	Q26476014
Studholme Farmhouse	II				18 December 1987	TM2750672020; 52°17′57″N 1°20′07″E		1032869	Upload Photo	Q26284310
The Old White Horse	II				18 December 1987	TM2749073282; 52°18′38″N 1°20′09″E		1352228	Upload Photo	Q26635262
War Memorial	II		war memorial		31 May 2001	TM2922172296; 52°18′03″N 1°21′38″E		1246132	War Memorial More images	Q26538571
White House Farmhouse	II*				18 December 1987	TM2740973150; 52°18′34″N 1°20′04″E		1285326	Upload Photo	Q17539601
Hulvertree Farmhouse	II	Badingham Road			18 December 1987	TM3065069889; 52°16′43″N 1°22′47″E		1285307	Upload Photo	Q26574011
Manor Farmhouse	II	Badingham Road			18 December 1987	TM3025170907; 52°17′17″N 1°22′29″E		1032870	Upload Photo	Q26284311
Rookery Farmhouse	II	Badingham Road			18 December 1987	TM3004771450; 52°17′35″N 1°22′19″E		1180732	Upload Photo	Q26476042
Moat Farmhouse	II	Banyard's Green			18 December 1987	TM2978273181; 52°18′31″N 1°22′10″E		1180779	Upload Photo	Q26476095
Stadhaugh Manor Farmhouse	II	Banyard's Green			29 July 1955	TM2957373391; 52°18′38″N 1°21′59″E		1032872	Upload Photo	Q26284313
The Timbers	II	Banyard's Green			18 December 1987	TM3009972971; 52°18′24″N 1°22′26″E		1032871	Upload Photo	Q26284312
Blyth House	II	Bickers Hill Road			18 December 1987	TM2978972564; 52°18′11″N 1°22′08″E		1032873	Upload Photo	Q26284315
Waterloo House	II*	Bickers Hill Road			29 July 1955	TM2973172473; 52°18′08″N 1°22′05″E		1180816	Upload Photo	Q17536015
Crouch Cottages	II	Cake Street			18 December 1987	TM2767473557; 52°18′46″N 1°20′19″E		1180841	Upload Photo	Q26476162
Ivy House Farmhouse	II	Cake Street			18 December 1987	TM2782573545; 52°18′46″N 1°20′27″E		1032874	Upload Photo	Q26284316
Lodge Cottages	II	Cake Street			18 December 1987	TM2958174169; 52°19′03″N 1°22′01″E		1180854	Upload Photo	Q26476177
Lodge Farmhouse	II	Cake Street			29 July 1955	TM2930673954; 52°18′57″N 1°21′46″E		1032875	Upload Photo	Q26284317
Barn 20 Metres North of Low Farmhouse	II	Dennington Road			18 December 1987	TM2908769890; 52°16′46″N 1°21′25″E		1285243	Upload Photo	Q26573950
Laxfield House	II	Dennington Road			18 December 1987	TM2874170592; 52°17′09″N 1°21′08″E		1180878	Upload Photo	Q26476205
Low Farmhouse	II	Dennington Road			18 December 1987	TM2909969866; 52°16′45″N 1°21′25″E		1032877	Upload Photo	Q26284320
Mills Farmhouse	II	Dennington Road			18 December 1987	TM2901271007; 52°17′22″N 1°21′24″E		1032876	Upload Photo	Q26284318
Chestnut Tree Farmhouse	II	Framlingham Road			18 December 1987	TM2893072127; 52°17′58″N 1°21′22″E		1032878	Upload Photo	Q26284322
Aldridge's Farmhouse	II*	Fressingfield Road			18 December 1987	TM2737173463; 52°18′44″N 1°20′03″E		1180914	Upload Photo	Q17536022
Barn Immediately North West of Aldridge's Farmhouse	II	Fressingfield Road			18 December 1987	TM2736073480; 52°18′44″N 1°20′03″E		1352231	Upload Photo	Q26635265
Lime Tree Farmhouse	II	Fressingfield Road			18 December 1987	TM2777774068; 52°19′03″N 1°20′26″E		1180927	Upload Photo	Q26476261
Sunnyside Farmhouse	II	Gorams Mill Lane			18 December 1987	TM2968772639; 52°18′14″N 1°22′03″E		1180949	Upload Photo	Q26476288
Wolfe House	II	High Street, Woodbridge, IP13 8DX			24 April 1986	TM2949072378; 52°18′06″N 1°21′52″E		1181029	Upload Photo	Q26476376
Field House	II	Station Road, IP13 8HG			18 December 1987	TM2862872684; 52°18′17″N 1°21′08″E		1352230	Upload Photo	Q26635264
The Burrow	II	Station Road, Woodbridge, IP13 8HF			18 December 1987	TM2918672281; 52°18′03″N 1°21′36″E		1032880	Upload Photo	Q26284325
Guildhall Cottages	II	3, The Street			18 December 1987	TM2958172370; 52°18′05″N 1°21′57″E		1352233	Upload Photo	Q26635267
Baptist Chapel	II	The Street			18 December 1987	TM2936972362; 52°18′05″N 1°21′46″E		1032841	Upload Photo	Q26284280
Church of All Saints'	I	The Street	church building		29 July 1955	TM2961772444; 52°18′08″N 1°21′59″E		1180967	Church of All Saints' More images	Q17526180
Clematis House	II	The Street			18 December 1987	TM2945072371; 52°18′05″N 1°21′50″E		1352215	Upload Photo	Q26635250
Cringles	II	The Street			18 December 1987	TM2946872374; 52°18′05″N 1°21′51″E		1352195	Upload Photo	Q26635231
K6 Telephone Kiosk Outside Post Office	II	The Street			30 June 1988	TM2960172405; 52°18′06″N 1°21′58″E		1051977	Upload Photo	Q26303792
Lilac Cottage	II	The Street			18 December 1987	TM2929872280; 52°18′03″N 1°21′42″E		1032843	Upload Photo	Q26284284
Old Guildhall	II*	The Street	guild house		29 July 1955	TM2962272380; 52°18′05″N 1°21′59″E		1180990	Old Guildhall More images	Q17536035
Railings Along Street Frontage of Baptist Chapel	II	The Street			18 December 1987	TM2937372344; 52°18′05″N 1°21′46″E		1032842	Upload Photo	Q26284282
Rose Cottage	II	The Street			18 December 1987	TM2946472411; 52°18′07″N 1°21′51″E		1181035	Upload Photo	Q26476384
St Helens	II	The Street			18 December 1987	TM2954072398; 52°18′06″N 1°21′55″E		1181023	Upload Photo	Q26476370
Suffolk House	II	The Street			18 December 1987	TM2951172386; 52°18′06″N 1°21′53″E		1032883	Upload Photo	Q26284328
The Old Bakery	II	The Street			18 December 1987	TM2960072375; 52°18′05″N 1°21′58″E		1032881	Upload Photo	Q26284326
The Old Manse	II	The Street			18 December 1987	TM2934072353; 52°18′05″N 1°21′44″E		1352216	Upload Photo	Q26635251
The Royal Oak	II	The Street	pub		18 December 1987	TM2964272411; 52°18′06″N 1°22′00″E		1352232	The Royal Oak More images	Q26635266
The Villa	II	The Street			18 December 1987	TM2955372401; 52°18′06″N 1°21′56″E		1032882	Upload Photo	Q26284327
West End House	II	The Street			18 December 1987	TM2959272405; 52°18′06″N 1°21′58″E		1285218	Upload Photo	Q26573930
Willow Cottage	II	The Street			18 December 1987	TM2946672443; 52°18′08″N 1°21′51″E		1032840	Upload Photo	Q26284279
Glaven Cottage	II	Vicarage Road			15 May 1997	TM2963472356; 52°18′05″N 1°22′00″E		1245360	Upload Photo	Q26537907
Elms Farmhouse	II	Wells Corner			18 December 1987	TM2770571826; 52°17′50″N 1°20′17″E		1352217	Upload Photo	Q26635252
The King's Head (also Known As the Low House)	II	Woodbridge, IP13 8DW	thatched pub		18 December 1987	TM2969272490; 52°18′09″N 1°22′03″E		1032879	The King's Head (also Known As the Low House) More images	Q26284323

== See also ==
- Grade I listed buildings in Suffolk
- Grade II* listed buildings in Suffolk

== Sources ==
- Bettely, James; Pevsner, Nikolaus (2015) [1961], Suffolk: West, The Buildings of England, New Haven and London: Yale University Press, ISBN 978-0-300-19655-9
