= Listed buildings in Needham Market =

Historic structures in Suffolk, England

Needham Market is a town and civil parish in the Mid Suffolk District of Suffolk, England. It contains 101 listed buildings that are recorded in the National Heritage List for England. Of these one is grade I, five are grade II* and 95 are grade II.

This list is based on the information retrieved online from Historic England.

== Key ==
Grade	Criteria
I	Buildings that are of exceptional interest
II*	Particularly important buildings of more than special interest
II	Buildings that are of special interest

== Listing ==
Name	Grade	Location	Type	Completed (Note: The date given is the date used by Historic England as significant for the initial building or that of an important part in the structure's description.)	Date designated	Grid ref. (Note: The grid reference is based on the British national grid reference system, sometimes known as OSGB36, used by the Ordnance Survey.) Geo-coordinates	Notes	Entry number (Note: The "List Entry Number" is a unique number assigned to each listed building and scheduled monument by Historic England.)	Image	Wikidata
Barn, 40 Metres South West of Number 1, (chain House)	II	40 Metres South West Of Number 1, (chain House), High Street			9 December 1955	TM0898354717; 52°09′04″N 1°03′12″E		1232209	Upload Photo	Q26525752
Number 2 and Bond's Fish Shop, (including Attached Rear Range Now An Outbuilding of the Bull Inn)	II	(including Attached Rear Range Now An Outbuilding Of The Bull Inn), Bridge Street			9 December 1955	TM0881455145; 52°09′18″N 1°03′04″E		1232023	Upload Photo	Q26525575
Needham Market War Memorial	II	Barratts Lane, IP6 8BS			7 February 2020	TM0833154882; 52°09′10″N 1°02′38″E		1468224	Upload Photo	Q97451549
Needham Market War Memorial Lych Gate	II	Barratts Lane, IP6 8BS	war memorial		7 February 2020	TM0830554918; 52°09′12″N 1°02′37″E		1468529	Needham Market War Memorial Lych Gate More images	Q97451586
Dentist's Surgery and Number 129 High Street (barclays Bank)	II	Barrett's Lane			9 December 1955	TM0872355207; 52°09′20″N 1°02′59″E		1277355	Upload Photo	Q26566789
4 and 6, Bridge Street	II	4 and 6, Bridge Street			9 December 1955	TM0882255149; 52°09′18″N 1°03′04″E		1231760	Upload Photo	Q26525324
8 and 10, Bridge Street	II	8 and 10, Bridge Street			19 May 1986	TM0882655161; 52°09′19″N 1°03′05″E		1277258	Upload Photo	Q26566701
1-7, Coddenham Road	II	1-7, Coddenham Road			19 May 1986	TM0904754799; 52°09′07″N 1°03′15″E		1231762	Upload Photo	Q26525326
4, Coddenham Road	II	4, Coddenham Road			19 May 1986	TM0904154768; 52°09′06″N 1°03′15″E		1232115	Upload Photo	Q26525665
Uvedale Farmhouse	II	11, Coddenham Road			19 May 1986	TM0906654789; 52°09′06″N 1°03′16″E		1231763	Upload Photo	Q26525327
Bosmere Mill and Flint Cottage	II	Coddenham Road, IP6 8NU	mill		19 May 1986	TM0958054657; 52°09′01″N 1°03′43″E		1231764	Bosmere Mill and Flint Cottage More images	Q26525328
Elton House	II	2, Hawksmill Street			9 December 1955	TM0873855233; 52°09′21″N 1°03′00″E		1232208	Upload Photo	Q26525751
Longville House	II	10, Hawksmill Street			19 May 1986	TM0879355301; 52°09′23″N 1°03′03″E		1253618	Upload Photo	Q26545352
11, Hawksmill Street	II	11, Hawksmill Street			9 December 1955	TM0875955293; 52°09′23″N 1°03′01″E		1232133	Upload Photo	Q26525681
13 and 15, Hawksmill Street (see Details for Further Address Information)	II	11, Hawksmill Street			9 December 1955	TM0876455301; 52°09′23″N 1°03′02″E		1231765	Upload Photo	Q26525329
17, 19 and 21, Hawksmill Street	II	17, 19 and 21, Hawksmill Street			19 May 1986	TM0877755321; 52°09′24″N 1°03′02″E		1232196	Upload Photo	Q26525740
27, Hawksmill Street	II	27, Hawksmill Street			19 May 1986	TM0878655335; 52°09′24″N 1°03′03″E		1231766	Upload Photo	Q26525330
Hawksmill Cottage	II	29, Hawksmill Street			19 May 1986	TM0878955340; 52°09′25″N 1°03′03″E		1232205	Upload Photo	Q26525748
Hawks Mill (including Bridge Beneath Road Attached to West Side)	II	Hawksmill Street	mill building		26 May 1981	TM0888055432; 52°09′27″N 1°03′08″E		1277199	Hawks Mill (including Bridge Beneath Road Attached to West Side) More images	Q26566647
Valley House	II	Hawksmill Street			9 December 1955	TM0878655449; 52°09′28″N 1°03′03″E		1277198	Upload Photo	Q26566646
Chain House	II	1, High Street			9 December 1955	TM0900554761; 52°09′06″N 1°03′13″E		1253625	Upload Photo	Q26545359
2 and 4, High Street	II	2 and 4, High Street			9 December 1955	TM0902754781; 52°09′06″N 1°03′14″E		1254055	Upload Photo	Q26545746
3, 5 and 7, High Street	II	3, 5 and 7, High Street			9 December 1955	TM0899654778; 52°09′06″N 1°03′13″E		1277201	Upload Photo	Q26566649
10 and 12, High Street	II	10 and 12, High Street			9 December 1955	TM0899954836; 52°09′08″N 1°03′13″E		1253668	Upload Photo	Q26545398
Baileys Plaice the Swan Inn	II	11, High Street			9 December 1955	TM0898254804; 52°09′07″N 1°03′12″E		1261698	Upload Photo	Q26552630
The Yews	II	15, High Street			19 May 1986	TM0897354814; 52°09′07″N 1°03′12″E		1253652	Upload Photo	Q26545385
16, High Street	II	16, High Street			19 May 1986	TM0899054853; 52°09′09″N 1°03′13″E		1253669	Upload Photo	Q26545399
The Croft	II	18, High Street			9 December 1955	TM0898254863; 52°09′09″N 1°03′12″E		1261466	Upload Photo	Q26552413
Office and Workshop of F Sparrow and Sons (builders) Limited, 20 Metres South West of Number 101 High Street	II	20 Metres South West Of Number 101 High Street, High Street			30 September 1986	TM0873955112; 52°09′17″N 1°03′00″E		1254410	Upload Photo	Q26546082
22 and 24, High Street	II	22 and 24, High Street			19 May 1986	TM0896554882; 52°09′10″N 1°03′11″E		1253670	Upload Photo	Q26545400
23, High Street	II	23, High Street			19 May 1986	TM0896254833; 52°09′08″N 1°03′11″E		1253653	Upload Photo	Q26545386
25, High Street	II	25, High Street			19 May 1986	TM0895754842; 52°09′08″N 1°03′11″E		1261699	Upload Photo	Q26552631
26, High Street	II	26, High Street			19 May 1986	TM0896154896; 52°09′10″N 1°03′11″E		1261469	Upload Photo	Q26552416
27, High Street	II	27, High Street			19 May 1986	TM0895154852; 52°09′09″N 1°03′11″E		1253654	Upload Photo	Q26545387
Doctor's Surgery	II	33 and 35, High Street			9 December 1955	TM0894254873; 52°09′09″N 1°03′10″E		1261662	Upload Photo	Q26552595
Numbers 40 (parsons), 40a, 42 and 44 Including Attached Outbuildings	II	40a, 42 and 44 Including Attached Outbuildings, High Street			9 December 1955	TM0889654973; 52°09′13″N 1°03′08″E		1254139	Upload Photo	Q26545824
50, High Street	II	50, High Street			19 May 1986	TM0888854997; 52°09′13″N 1°03′08″E		1253672	Upload Photo	Q26545402
52 and 54, High Street	II	52 and 54, High Street			9 December 1955	TM0888155008; 52°09′14″N 1°03′07″E		1253673	Upload Photo	Q26545403
56, High Street	II	56, High Street			9 December 1955	TM0887855022; 52°09′14″N 1°03′07″E		1261425	Upload Photo	Q26552376
60 and 62, High Street	II	60 and 62, High Street			9 December 1955	TM0886155045; 52°09′15″N 1°03′06″E		1261670	Upload Photo	Q26552603
61, High Street	II	61, High Street			19 May 1986	TM0888054957; 52°09′12″N 1°03′07″E		1253905	Upload Photo	Q26545614
The Almshouses	II	67, High Street			9 December 1955	TM0886554983; 52°09′13″N 1°03′06″E		1261663	Upload Photo	Q26552596
Crowleigh	II	69, High Street			9 December 1955	TM0885455001; 52°09′14″N 1°03′06″E		1253907	Upload Photo	Q26545616
Clovelly	II	71, High Street			19 May 1986	TM0884255006; 52°09′14″N 1°03′05″E		1253657	Upload Photo	Q26545390
75, High Street (see Details for Further Address Information)	II	75, High Street			19 May 1986	TM0883755025; 52°09′14″N 1°03′05″E		1261544	Upload Photo	Q26552485
76, High Street	II	76, High Street			19 May 1986	TM0882755090; 52°09′16″N 1°03′05″E		1253674	Upload Photo	Q26545404
Beck House	II	77, High Street			19 May 1986	TM0883155032; 52°09′15″N 1°03′05″E		1261664	Upload Photo	Q26552597
78 and 80, High Street	II	78 and 80, High Street			9 December 1955	TM0882055109; 52°09′17″N 1°03′04″E		1261671	Upload Photo	Q26552604
79, High Street	II	79, High Street			19 May 1986	TM0881855038; 52°09′15″N 1°03′04″E		1253916	Upload Photo	Q26545625
82, High Street	II	82, High Street			19 May 1986	TM0881055110; 52°09′17″N 1°03′04″E		1254202	Upload Photo	Q26545885
83 and 85, High Street	II	83 and 85, High Street			19 May 1986	TM0881055051; 52°09′15″N 1°03′04″E		1253659	Upload Photo	Q26545392
84, High Street	II	84, High Street			9 December 1955	TM0880855115; 52°09′17″N 1°03′04″E		1253675	Upload Photo	Q26545405
The Bull Inn	II*	86, High Street	inn		9 December 1955	TM0881355135; 52°09′18″N 1°03′04″E		1277416	The Bull Inn More images	Q17539382
87 and 89, High Street	II	87 and 89, High Street			9 December 1955	TM0880555065; 52°09′16″N 1°03′03″E		1261665	Upload Photo	Q26552598
88 and 90, High Street	II	88 and 90, High Street			9 December 1955	TM0880255148; 52°09′18″N 1°03′03″E		1254217	Upload Photo	Q26545900
91 and 91a, High Street	II	91 and 91a, High Street			9 December 1955	TM0878655084; 52°09′16″N 1°03′02″E		1261666	Upload Photo	Q26552599
Pillar House	II	92, High Street			9 December 1955	TM0879155158; 52°09′19″N 1°03′03″E		1253676	Upload Photo	Q26545406
93, High Street	II*	93, High Street			9 December 1955	TM0878255092; 52°09′17″N 1°03′02″E		1253661	Upload Photo	Q17539215
94, High Street	II	94, High Street			9 December 1955	TM0876055198; 52°09′20″N 1°03′01″E		1261672	Upload Photo	Q26552605
Bugs Bar	II	95 and 97, High Street			9 December 1955	TM0877655100; 52°09′17″N 1°03′02″E		1261667	Upload Photo	Q26552600
96, High Street	II	96, High Street			9 December 1955	TM0875655204; 52°09′20″N 1°03′01″E		1253677	Upload Photo	Q26545407
Young's Stores	II	101, High Street			9 December 1955	TM0876955130; 52°09′18″N 1°03′02″E		1253663	Upload Photo	Q26545394
106 and 108, High Street	II	106 and 108, High Street			19 May 1986	TM0874355224; 52°09′21″N 1°03′00″E		1261673	Upload Photo	Q26552606
107 and 109, High Street	II	107 and 109, High Street			19 May 1986	TM0874855148; 52°09′18″N 1°03′01″E		1261668	Upload Photo	Q26552601
Numbers 110 (lamps) with Outbuildings Attached to Rear and Number 112	II	110 and 112, High Street			9 December 1955	TM0872555262; 52°09′22″N 1°03′00″E		1261378	Upload Photo	Q26552334
Tudor House	II*	113, High Street			9 December 1955	TM0873855167; 52°09′19″N 1°03′00″E		1253664	Upload Photo	Q17539248
114, High Street	II	114, High Street			19 May 1986	TM0871255273; 52°09′23″N 1°02′59″E		1253678	Upload Photo	Q26545408
115, High Street	II	115, High Street			9 December 1955	TM0872955173; 52°09′19″N 1°03′00″E		1261669	Upload Photo	Q26552602
119 and 121, High Street	II	119 and 121, High Street			19 May 1986	TM0872855182; 52°09′20″N 1°03′00″E		1253665	Upload Photo	Q26545395
126 and 128, High Street	II	126 and 128, High Street			19 May 1986	TM0868455306; 52°09′24″N 1°02′57″E		1253679	Upload Photo	Q26545409
Coronation Cottage	II	130, High Street			19 May 1986	TM0867855312; 52°09′24″N 1°02′57″E		1261355	Upload Photo	Q26552314
131, High Street	II	131, High Street			9 December 1955	TM0866355245; 52°09′22″N 1°02′56″E		1254005	Upload Photo	Q26545706
132, High Street	II	132, High Street			19 May 1986	TM0867655316; 52°09′24″N 1°02′57″E		1261674	Upload Photo	Q26552607
133 and 135, High Street	II	133 and 135, High Street			19 May 1986	TM0869655258; 52°09′22″N 1°02′58″E		1253666	Upload Photo	Q26545396
137 and 137a, High Street	II	137 and 137a, High Street			9 December 1955	TM0868955268; 52°09′22″N 1°02′58″E		1261496	Upload Photo	Q26552441
Silver Birches	II	143, High Street			9 December 1955	TM0865555297; 52°09′23″N 1°02′56″E		1253667	Upload Photo	Q26545397
Barn 60 Metres South of Number 1 (chain House)	II	High Street			19 May 1986	TM0899554702; 52°09′04″N 1°03′12″E		1253644	Upload Photo	Q26545378
Church of St John the Baptist	I	High Street	church building		9 December 1955	TM0877555177; 52°09′19″N 1°03′02″E		1254254	Church of St John the Baptist More images	Q17526337
Former Quaker Meeting House Behind Numbers 87 and 89 High Street	II	High Street			9 December 1955	TM0878655052; 52°09′15″N 1°03′02″E		1253660	Upload Photo	Q26545393
Number 81 and Former Meeting Room at Rear	II	High Street			19 May 1986	TM0881355046; 52°09′15″N 1°03′04″E		1253658	Upload Photo	Q26545391
Ostler's Lodge	II	High Street			19 May 1986	TM0885455055; 52°09′15″N 1°03′06″E		1254170	Upload Photo	Q26545854
Outbuilding 20 Metres South West of Number 1 (chain House)	II	High Street			9 December 1955	TM0902154739; 52°09′05″N 1°03′14″E		1277200	Upload Photo	Q26566648
Sunset Blinds the Relic Shop	II	High Street			19 May 1986	TM0874455217; 52°09′21″N 1°03′00″E		1254285	Upload Photo	Q26545964
The Limes Hotel	II*	High Street	hotel		9 December 1955	TM0877255121; 52°09′18″N 1°03′02″E		1253662	The Limes Hotel More images	Q17539234
The Old Town Hall	II	High Street	architectural structure		24 August 1977	TM0887154968; 52°09′12″N 1°03′07″E		1253656	The Old Town Hall More images	Q26545389
The Swan Inn	II	High Street	inn		9 December 1955	TM0897654790; 52°09′07″N 1°03′12″E		1253650	The Swan Inn More images	Q26545383
United Reformed Church	II	High Street			9 December 1955	TM0892254960; 52°09′12″N 1°03′09″E		1253671	Upload Photo	Q26545401
Prospect House	II	1, Ipswich Road			9 December 1955	TM0903254757; 52°09′05″N 1°03′15″E		1254331	Upload Photo	Q26546009
3, Ipswich Road	II	3, Ipswich Road			19 May 1986	TM0903854747; 52°09′05″N 1°03′15″E		1253680	Upload Photo	Q26545410
Watering Farmhouse	II	Ipswich Road			19 May 1986	TM0953054260; 52°08′49″N 1°03′40″E		1231448	Upload Photo	Q26525042
The Ancient House	II*	1 and 3, King William Street			9 December 1955	TM0875355252; 52°09′22″N 1°03′01″E		1254336	Upload Photo	Q17539266
17 and 18, King William Street	II	17 and 18, King William Street			9 December 1955	TM0878455201; 52°09′20″N 1°03′03″E		1261675	Upload Photo	Q26552608
21, King William Street	II	21, King William Street			9 December 1955	TM0878855193; 52°09′20″N 1°03′03″E		1253681	Upload Photo	Q26545411
23, King William Street	II	23, King William Street			9 December 1955	TM0879355188; 52°09′20″N 1°03′03″E		1253682	Upload Photo	Q26545412
25 and 27, King William Street	II	25 and 27, King William Street			9 December 1955	TM0879655184; 52°09′20″N 1°03′03″E		1261676	Upload Photo	Q26552609
29, King William Street	II	29, King William Street			19 May 1986	TM0880455177; 52°09′19″N 1°03′04″E		1253683	Upload Photo	Q26545413
Railway Station	II	Station Road	railway station		19 May 1986	TM0911454881; 52°09′09″N 1°03′19″E		1253684	Railway Station More images	Q2526515
The Rampant Horse Inn	II	Station Road	inn		19 May 1986	TM0903654806; 52°09′07″N 1°03′15″E		1261677	The Rampant Horse Inn More images	Q26552610
Stowmarket Navigation Creeting Lock and Bridge	II	Stowmarket Navigation			21 October 1994	TM1051554302; 52°08′49″N 1°04′31″E		1261325	Upload Photo	Q26552284
Hill House	II	Stowmarket Road			9 December 1955	TM0813955516; 52°09′31″N 1°02′29″E		1254384	Upload Photo	Q26546059
Stable 20 Metres North East of Hill House	II	Stowmarket Road			9 December 1955	TM0815155550; 52°09′32″N 1°02′30″E		1253685	Upload Photo	Q26545415

== See also ==
- Grade I listed buildings in Suffolk
- Grade II* listed buildings in Suffolk

== Sources ==
- Bettely, James; Pevsner, Nikolaus (2015) [1961], Suffolk: West, The Buildings of England, New Haven and London: Yale University Press, ISBN 978-0-300-19655-9
