= Listed buildings in Eye, Suffolk =

Historic structures in Suffolk, England

Eye is a town and civil parish in the Mid Suffolk District of Suffolk, England. It contains 166 listed buildings that are recorded in the National Heritage List for England. Of these three are grade I, eight are grade II* and 155 are grade II.

This list is based on the information retrieved online from Historic England.

== Key ==
Grade	Criteria
I	Buildings that are of exceptional interest
II*	Particularly important buildings of more than special interest
II	Buildings that are of special interest

== Listing ==
Name	Grade	Location	Type	Completed (Note: The date given is the date used by Historic England as significant for the initial building or that of an important part in the structure's description.)	Date designated	Grid ref. (Note: The grid reference is based on the British national grid reference system, sometimes known as OSGB36, used by the Ordnance Survey.) Geo-coordinates	Notes	Entry number (Note: The "List Entry Number" is a unique number assigned to each listed building and scheduled monument by Historic England.)	Image	Wikidata
Eye War Memorial	II	IP23 7AF	war memorial		12 September 2018	TM1450973906; 52°19′17″N 1°08′46″E		1459009	Eye War Memorial More images	Q66479914
Major Farmhouse	II	IP23 7HG			9 February 2021	TM1213772418; 52°18′32″N 1°06′38″E		1472877	Upload Photo	Q105721206
The Laurels	II	Braisworth Road			15 June 1951	TM1351172991; 52°18′49″N 1°07′51″E		1316517	Upload Photo	Q26602807
Vine Cottage	II	Braisworth Road			12 February 1998	TM1357372971; 52°18′48″N 1°07′55″E		1316518	Upload Photo	Q26602808
1 and 1a, Broad Street	II	1 and 1a, Broad Street			20 October 1971	TM1453873899; 52°19′16″N 1°08′48″E		1316519	1 and 1a, Broad Street More images	Q26602809
Number 2 Including Front Railings	II	2, Broad Street			15 June 1951	TM1451773868; 52°19′15″N 1°08′46″E		1316520	Number 2 Including Front Railings More images	Q26602810
3, Broad Street	II	3, Broad Street			20 October 1971	TM1454373888; 52°19′16″N 1°08′48″E		1316521	3, Broad Street More images	Q26602811
4, Broad Street	II	4, Broad Street			20 October 1971	TM1452173858; 52°19′15″N 1°08′47″E		1316522	Upload Photo	Q26602812
4a, Broad Street	II	4a, Broad Street			20 October 1971	TM1452273850; 52°19′15″N 1°08′47″E		1316523	Upload Photo	Q26602813
5, Broad Street	II*	5, Broad Street			15 June 1951	TM1454573868; 52°19′15″N 1°08′48″E		1316524	5, Broad Street More images	Q17539713
6, Broad Street	II	6, Broad Street			20 October 1971	TM1451473832; 52°19′14″N 1°08′46″E		1316525	6, Broad Street More images	Q26602814
7, Broad Street	II	7, Broad Street			20 October 1971	TM1454273855; 52°19′15″N 1°08′48″E		1316526	Upload Photo	Q26602815
Brown and May Fishmongers	II	7a, Broad Street			20 October 1971	TM1454173860; 52°19′15″N 1°08′48″E		1316527	Brown and May Fishmongers More images	Q26602816
9, Broad Street	II	9, Broad Street			20 October 1971	TM1454273848; 52°19′15″N 1°08′48″E		1316528	9, Broad Street More images	Q26602817
11 and 13, Broad Street	II	11 and 13, Broad Street			20 October 1971	TM1454473840; 52°19′15″N 1°08′48″E		1316529	11 and 13, Broad Street More images	Q26602818
Post Office	II	14, Broad Street			20 October 1971	TM1448173804; 52°19′13″N 1°08′44″E		1316530	Post Office More images	Q26602819
15, Broad Street	II	15, Broad Street			20 October 1971	TM1453873823; 52°19′14″N 1°08′47″E		1316531	15, Broad Street More images	Q26602820
16 and 18, Broad Street	II	16 and 18, Broad Street			20 October 1971	TM1448373788; 52°19′13″N 1°08′44″E		1316532	16 and 18, Broad Street More images	Q26602821
Eye Theatre	II	Broad Street			15 June 1951	TM1453973809; 52°19′14″N 1°08′47″E		1316534	Upload Photo	Q26602823
Kerrison Memorial	II	Broad Street	memorial		20 October 1971	TM1450473813; 52°19′14″N 1°08′46″E		1316535	Kerrison Memorial More images	Q26602824
The Hexagon	II	Broad Street, IP23 7AD			20 October 1971	TM1450973776; 52°19′13″N 1°08′46″E		1316533	The Hexagon More images	Q26602822
Town Hall	II*	Broad Street	city hall		20 October 1971	TM1451273886; 52°19′16″N 1°08′46″E		1316536	Town Hall More images	Q17539734
White Lion House	II	Broad Street			15 June 1951	TM1451973810; 52°19′14″N 1°08′46″E		1316537	Upload Photo	Q26602825
Barn 45 Metres South of Brome Park Farmhouse (brome Park Farmhouse Not Included)	II	Brome Avenue			11 January 1990	TM1506375636; 52°20′12″N 1°09′19″E		1316538	Upload Photo	Q26602826
Conifer Cottage	II	Brome Avenue			12 February 1998	TM1462575216; 52°19′59″N 1°08′55″E		1316539	Upload Photo	Q26602827
Iron Gates and Lavendar Cottage	II	Brome Avenue			20 October 1971	TM1457775001; 52°19′52″N 1°08′52″E		1316563	Upload Photo	Q26602851
Mustardpot Barn	II	Brome Avenue, IP23 7HW			30 October 2012	TM1469575176; 52°19′58″N 1°08′59″E		1409518	Upload Photo	Q26676101
The Granary Approximately 50 Meters North of Iron Gates and Lavender Cottage	II	Brome Avenue, Brome			20 October 1999	TM1461375051; 52°19′54″N 1°08′54″E		1387185	Upload Photo	Q26666844
9, Buckshorn Lane	II	9, Buckshorn Lane			12 February 1998	TM1460373789; 52°19′13″N 1°08′51″E		1316564	Upload Photo	Q26602852
The Thatched House	II	19, Buckshorn Lane			20 October 1971	TM1463073761; 52°19′12″N 1°08′52″E		1316565	Upload Photo	Q26602853
Barn at Junction with Church Lane Including Wall to South and Wall Adjoining Number 5 Broad Street	II	Buckshorn Lane			12 February 1998	TM1457673871; 52°19′15″N 1°08′49″E		1316566	Upload Photo	Q26602854
1, Castle Street	II	1, Castle Street			20 October 1971	TM1451073768; 52°19′12″N 1°08′46″E		1316567	1, Castle Street More images	Q26602855
Midland Bank	II	2, Castle Street			20 October 1971	TM1448773770; 52°19′12″N 1°08′45″E		1316568	Midland Bank More images	Q26602856
Bank Buildings	II	3 and 3a, Castle Street			20 October 1971	TM1451373762; 52°19′12″N 1°08′46″E		1316569	Bank Buildings More images	Q26602857
Richmond House	II	4a, Castle Street			20 October 1971	TM1449173757; 52°19′12″N 1°08′45″E		1316570	Richmond House More images	Q26602858
5, Castle Street	II	5, Castle Street			20 October 1971	TM1451873753; 52°19′12″N 1°08′46″E		1316571	5, Castle Street More images	Q26602859
Bank Cottage	II	7, Castle Street			20 October 1971	TM1452573744; 52°19′11″N 1°08′46″E		1316572	Bank Cottage More images	Q26602860
9, Castle Street	II	9, Castle Street			20 October 1971	TM1452773738; 52°19′11″N 1°08′47″E		1316573	Upload Photo	Q26602861
11, Castle Street	II	11, Castle Street			20 October 1971	TM1454073728; 52°19′11″N 1°08′47″E		1316574	11, Castle Street More images	Q26602862
13, Castle Street	II	13, Castle Street			20 October 1971	TM1454573725; 52°19′11″N 1°08′48″E		1316575	13, Castle Street More images	Q26602863
15, Castle Street	II	15, Castle Street			20 October 1971	TM1455273724; 52°19′11″N 1°08′48″E		1316576	Upload Photo	Q26602864
18, Castle Street	II	18, Castle Street			12 February 1998	TM1452373724; 52°19′11″N 1°08′46″E		1316577	18, Castle Street More images	Q26602865
19, Castle Street	II	19, Castle Street			20 October 1971	TM1458273716; 52°19′10″N 1°08′49″E		1316578	Upload Photo	Q26602866
20, Castle Street	II	20, Castle Street			20 October 1971	TM1453473705; 52°19′10″N 1°08′47″E		1316579	Upload Photo	Q26602867
Queensborough	II	21, Castle Street			20 October 1971	TM1460773728; 52°19′11″N 1°08′51″E		1316580	Queensborough More images	Q26602868
22, Castle Street	II	22, Castle Street			20 October 1971	TM1454073701; 52°19′10″N 1°08′47″E		1316581	22, Castle Street More images	Q26602869
23, Castle Street	II	23, Castle Street			20 October 1971	TM1461873731; 52°19′11″N 1°08′51″E		1316582	23, Castle Street More images	Q26602870
25, Castle Street	II	25, Castle Street			20 October 1971	TM1463773728; 52°19′11″N 1°08′52″E		1316583	Upload Photo	Q26602871
31 and 33, Castle Street	II	31 and 33, Castle Street			15 June 1951	TM1475573735; 52°19′11″N 1°08′59″E		1316584	31 and 33, Castle Street More images	Q26602872
34, 36 and 38, Castle Street	II	34, 36 and 38, Castle Street			20 October 1971	TM1459373703; 52°19′10″N 1°08′50″E		1316585	34, 36 and 38, Castle Street More images	Q26602873
Sunnyside	II	39, Castle Street			20 October 1971	TM1478973751; 52°19′11″N 1°09′00″E		1316586	Upload Photo	Q26602874
Regency House	II	40, Castle Street			20 October 1971	TM1460873708; 52°19′10″N 1°08′51″E		1316587	Regency House More images	Q26602875
The Vicarage	II	41, Castle Street			20 October 1971	TM1483773760; 52°19′12″N 1°09′03″E		1316588	The Vicarage More images	Q26602876
42, Castle Street	II	42, Castle Street			20 October 1971	TM1461673709; 52°19′10″N 1°08′51″E		1316589	42, Castle Street More images	Q26602877
Norcon	II	44, Castle Street			20 October 1971	TM1462673713; 52°19′10″N 1°08′52″E		1316590	Norcon More images	Q26602878
46, Castle Street	II	46, Castle Street			12 February 1998	TM1464473716; 52°19′10″N 1°08′53″E		1316591	46, Castle Street More images	Q26602879
Stanley House	II	48, Castle Street			15 June 1951	TM1467973710; 52°19′10″N 1°08′55″E		1316592	Stanley House More images	Q26602880
Willow House	II	50, Castle Street			15 June 1951	TM1472573693; 52°19′10″N 1°08′57″E		1316594	Willow House More images	Q26602882
Stayer House	II*	52, Castle Street	house		15 June 1951	TM1481373716; 52°19′10″N 1°09′02″E		1316595	Stayer House More images	Q17539763
Crinkle Crankle Wall South of Number 48 Stanley House	II	Castle Street			12 February 1998	TM1466473688; 52°19′09″N 1°08′54″E		1316593	Upload Photo	Q26602881
Eye Castle	I	Castle Street	motte-and-bailey castle		15 June 1951	TM1478473776; 52°19′12″N 1°09′00″E		1316598	Eye Castle More images	Q5422609
Garden Wall Extending West from Number 52 Stayer House	II	Castle Street			12 February 1998	TM1476673722; 52°19′10″N 1°08′59″E		1316596	Upload Photo	Q26602883
Stable Block to East of Number 52 Stayer House	II	Castle Street			15 June 1951	TM1484273718; 52°19′10″N 1°09′03″E		1316597	Upload Photo	Q26602884
1, Church Street	II	1, Church Street			20 October 1971	TM1454473881; 52°19′16″N 1°08′48″E		1316600	1, Church Street More images	Q26602886
St Lukes House	II	4, Church Street			12 February 1998	TM1460073873; 52°19′16″N 1°08′51″E		1316601	St Lukes House More images	Q26602887
York Cottage	II	5, Church Street			21 October 1971	TM1458573887; 52°19′16″N 1°08′50″E		1316602	York Cottage More images	Q26602888
9 and 11, Church Street	II	9 and 11, Church Street			20 October 1971	TM1460973891; 52°19′16″N 1°08′51″E		1316603	9 and 11, Church Street More images	Q26602889
13 and 15, Church Street	II	13 and 15, Church Street			20 October 1978	TM1461773899; 52°19′16″N 1°08′52″E		1316604	Upload Photo	Q26602890
14, 16 and 18, Church Street	II	14, 16 and 18, Church Street			12 February 1998	TM1467873868; 52°19′15″N 1°08′55″E		1316605	14, 16 and 18, Church Street More images	Q26602891
20 and 22, Church Street	II	20 and 22, Church Street			15 June 1951	TM1468973871; 52°19′15″N 1°08′55″E		1316606	20 and 22, Church Street More images	Q26602892
24 and 26, Church Street	II	24 and 26, Church Street			20 October 1971	TM1472573868; 52°19′15″N 1°08′57″E		1316607	24 and 26, Church Street More images	Q26602893
28, Church Street	II	28, Church Street			12 February 1998	TM1473273867; 52°19′15″N 1°08′58″E		1316608	28, Church Street More images	Q26602894
Castle House	II	30 and 32, Church Street			12 February 1998	TM1473073831; 52°19′14″N 1°08′58″E		1316609	Upload Photo	Q26602895
Gatehouse	II	36 and 38, Church Street			12 February 1998	TM1474273865; 52°19′15″N 1°08′58″E		1316610	Gatehouse More images	Q26602896
37, Church Street	II	37, Church Street			12 February 1998	TM1476873873; 52°19′15″N 1°09′00″E		1316611	37, Church Street More images	Q26602897
39, Church Street	II	39, Church Street			20 October 1971	TM1478473869; 52°19′15″N 1°09′00″E		1316612	39, Church Street More images	Q26602898
40 and 42, Church Street	II	40 and 42, Church Street			15 June 1951	TM1477973854; 52°19′15″N 1°09′00″E		1316613	40 and 42, Church Street More images	Q26602899
Hillside	II	44, Church Street			15 June 1951	TM1480173841; 52°19′14″N 1°09′01″E		1316614	Upload Photo	Q26602900
Victoria Buildings	II	45, 47 and 49, Church Street			12 February 1998	TM1480073864; 52°19′15″N 1°09′01″E		1316615	Victoria Buildings More images	Q26602901
The Cottage White House	II*	53, Church Street	house		15 June 1951	TM1482673846; 52°19′14″N 1°09′03″E		1316616	The Cottage White House More images	Q17539778
Boundary Walls and Gates to St Peter and St Pauls Churchyard	II	Church Street			12 February 1998	TM1488673746; 52°19′11″N 1°09′06″E		1316618	Boundary Walls and Gates to St Peter and St Pauls Churchyard More images	Q26602902
Church of St Peter and St Paul	I	Church Street	church building		15 June 1951	TM1489073797; 52°19′13″N 1°09′06″E		1316617	Church of St Peter and St Paul More images	Q17526387
Monument to George Edwards 5 Metres North of Church of St Peter and St Paul	II	Church Street			12 February 1998	TM1488373821; 52°19′13″N 1°09′06″E		1316619	Upload Photo	Q26602903
Monument to Marianne Sapio 5 Metres North of Church of St Peter and Paul	II	Church Street			12 February 1998	TM1488073821; 52°19′13″N 1°09′05″E		1316620	Upload Photo	Q26602904
The Cottage the Old Vicarage	II	Church Street			15 June 1951	TM1491273822; 52°19′13″N 1°09′07″E		1316622	Upload Photo	Q26602905
The Guildhall	I	Church Street	guild house		15 June 1951	TM1486573817; 52°19′13″N 1°09′05″E		1316621	The Guildhall More images	Q17526392
Alder Carr Lodge	II	Clint Road			20 October 1971	TM1468371876; 52°18′11″N 1°08′51″E		1316623	Upload Photo	Q26602906
Park Lodge	II	Clint Road			20 October 1971	TM1469671879; 52°18′11″N 1°08′51″E		1316624	Upload Photo	Q26602907
Barn at Cookley Farmhouse	II	Cookley Road			12 February 1998	TM1660874088; 52°19′20″N 1°10′37″E		1316626	Upload Photo	Q26602908
Cookley Farmhouse	II*	Cookley Road			15 June 1951	TM1660374151; 52°19′22″N 1°10′37″E		1316625	Upload Photo	Q17539803
Cranley Hall	II*	Cranley Road			15 June 1951	TM1524072835; 52°18′41″N 1°09′22″E		1316627	Upload Photo	Q17539816
Cranley Manor	II	Cranley Road			15 June 1951	TM1640772698; 52°18′35″N 1°10′23″E		1316632	Upload Photo	Q26602913
Garden House Approximately 50 Metres East of Cranley Hall	II	Cranley Road			20 October 1971	TM1529072835; 52°18′41″N 1°09′25″E		1316628	Upload Photo	Q26602909
Gate Farmhouse	II	Cranley Road			11 January 1991	TM1662072446; 52°18′27″N 1°10′34″E		1316633	Upload Photo	Q26602914
Granary Approximately 70 Metres North of Cranley Hall	II	Cranley Road			12 February 1998	TM1529172907; 52°18′43″N 1°09′25″E		1316629	Upload Photo	Q26602910
Kings Farmhouse	II	Cranley Road			12 February 1998	TM1709171674; 52°18′01″N 1°10′57″E		1316540	Upload Photo	Q26602828
Old Stables Approximately 50 Metres North of Cranley Hall	II	Cranley Road			12 February 1998	TM1528672891; 52°18′43″N 1°09′25″E		1316631	Upload Photo	Q26602912
Town Farmhouse	II	Cranley Road			15 June 1951	TM1569272816; 52°18′40″N 1°09′46″E		1316541	Upload Photo	Q26602829
4, Cross Street	II	4, Cross Street	building		20 October 1971	TM1447173832; 52°19′14″N 1°08′44″E		1316542	4, Cross Street More images	Q26602830
Moiety Cottage	II	5, Cross Street	cottage		20 October 1971	TM1447273844; 52°19′15″N 1°08′44″E		1316543	Moiety Cottage More images	Q26602831
Queens Head Public House	II	7, Cross Street	pub		12 February 1998	TM1448573878; 52°19′16″N 1°08′45″E		1316544	Queens Head Public House More images	Q26602832
K6 Telephone Kiosk	II	Cross Street			5 October 1987	TM1451473879; 52°19′16″N 1°08′46″E		1316545	K6 Telephone Kiosk More images	Q26602833
Number 1 (lilliput) and Number 3	II	3, Dove Lane			12 February 1998	TM1460373931; 52°19′17″N 1°08′51″E		1316546	Upload Photo	Q26602834
Abbey Farmhouse	II	Hoxne Road			15 June 1951	TM1530074214; 52°19′26″N 1°09′28″E		1316547	Upload Photo	Q26602835
Barn Approximately 100 Metres North West of Abbey Farmhouse	II	Hoxne Road	architectural structure		15 June 1951	TM1525374062; 52°19′21″N 1°09′26″E		1316548	Barn Approximately 100 Metres North West of Abbey Farmhouse More images	Q5422630
Burnthouse Farmhouse	II	Hoxne Road			15 June 1951	TM1650274287; 52°19′26″N 1°10′32″E		1316549	Upload Photo	Q26602836
Red House	II	1 and 1b, Lambseth Street			20 October 1971	TM1448973906; 52°19′17″N 1°08′45″E		1316550	Red House More images	Q26602837
White House	II	3, Lambseth Street			20 October 1971	TM1448273942; 52°19′18″N 1°08′45″E		1316551	White House More images	Q26602838
4, Lambseth Street	II	4, Lambseth Street			12 February 1998	TM1452073922; 52°19′17″N 1°08′47″E		1316552	4, Lambseth Street More images	Q26602839
The Town Clerks Cottage	II	5, Lambseth Street			20 October 1971	TM1448573958; 52°19′18″N 1°08′45″E		1316553	The Town Clerks Cottage More images	Q26602840
6, Lambseth Street	II	6, Lambseth Street			12 February 1998	TM1451873929; 52°19′17″N 1°08′47″E		1316554	6, Lambseth Street More images	Q26602841
Dove House	II	7, Lambseth Street			20 October 1971	TM1448473969; 52°19′19″N 1°08′45″E		1316555	Dove House More images	Q26602842
Mallow House	II	8, Lambseth Street			15 June 1951	TM1451673941; 52°19′18″N 1°08′46″E		1316556	Mallow House More images	Q26602843
9 and 11, Lambseth Street	II	9 and 11, Lambseth Street			15 June 1951	TM1448173977; 52°19′19″N 1°08′45″E		1316557	9 and 11, Lambseth Street More images	Q26602844
Heyden House	II	10, Lambseth Street			15 June 1951	TM1451273950; 52°19′18″N 1°08′46″E		1316558	Upload Photo	Q26602845
12, Lambseth Street	II	12, Lambseth Street			15 June 1951	TM1451073954; 52°19′18″N 1°08′46″E		1316559	12, Lambseth Street More images	Q26602846
13, Lambseth Street	II	13, Lambseth Street			15 June 1951	TM1447773985; 52°19′19″N 1°08′45″E		1316560	13, Lambseth Street More images	Q26602847
Albion House	II	14, Lambseth Street			15 June 1951	TM1450573965; 52°19′19″N 1°08′46″E		1316561	Albion House More images	Q26602848
15, Lambseth Street	II	15, Lambseth Street			20 October 1971	TM1447473991; 52°19′20″N 1°08′44″E		1316562	15, Lambseth Street More images	Q26602850
Linden House	II	16, Lambseth Street			15 June 1951	TM1451173992; 52°19′19″N 1°08′46″E		1334408	Linden House More images	Q26619075
Lambseth House	II	17, Lambseth Street			15 June 1951	TM1445074007; 52°19′20″N 1°08′43″E		1334409	Lambseth House More images	Q26619076
18 and 20, Lambseth Street	II	18 and 20, Lambseth Street			20 October 1971	TM1449874004; 52°19′20″N 1°08′46″E		1334410	18 and 20, Lambseth Street More images	Q26619077
Endleigh	II	22, Lambseth Street			20 October 1971	TM1449474013; 52°19′20″N 1°08′45″E		1334411	Endleigh More images	Q26619078
24, Lambseth Street	II	24, Lambseth Street			15 June 1951	TM1447274029; 52°19′21″N 1°08′44″E		1334412	24, Lambseth Street More images	Q26619079
Bedingfield Almshouses	II	26-32, Lambseth Street	almshouse		20 October 1971	TM1445674054; 52°19′22″N 1°08′44″E		1334413	Bedingfield Almshouses More images	Q26619080
Bridge House	II	34, Lambseth Street			15 June 1951	TM1444274078; 52°19′22″N 1°08′43″E		1334414	Bridge House More images	Q26619081
Dormer Cottage	II	40, Lambseth Street			20 October 1971	TM1439574159; 52°19′25″N 1°08′41″E		1334415	Upload Photo	Q26619082
Hill Cottage	II	42, Lambseth Street			20 October 1971	TM1439074170; 52°19′25″N 1°08′40″E		1334416	Upload Photo	Q26619083
Chandos Lodge	II	Lambseth Street			15 June 1951	TM1431474114; 52°19′24″N 1°08′36″E		1334417	Upload Photo	Q26619084
Crinkle Crankle Wall and Gates to Chandos Lodge	II	Lambseth Street			12 February 1998	TM1440574099; 52°19′23″N 1°08′41″E		1334419	Upload Photo	Q26619086
Garden Wall and Garden House Approximately 45 Metres North East of Chandos Lodge	II	Lambseth Street			12 February 1998	TM1433274135; 52°19′24″N 1°08′37″E		1334420	Upload Photo	Q26619087
68 and 69, Langton Green	II	68 and 69, Langton Green			12 February 1998	TM1434174904; 52°19′49″N 1°08′39″E		1334421	Upload Photo	Q26619088
81, Langton Green	II	81, Langton Green			20 October 1971	TM1450974814; 52°19′46″N 1°08′48″E		1334422	Upload Photo	Q26619089
Rose Cottage	II	88, Langton Green			20 October 1971	TM1442874795; 52°19′46″N 1°08′44″E		1334423	Upload Photo	Q26619090
Bromeland Cottage	II	Langton Green			20 October 1971	TM1449674769; 52°19′45″N 1°08′47″E		1334424	Upload Photo	Q26619091
Chestnut Farmhouse	II	Langton Green			15 June 1951	TM1386475382; 52°20′05″N 1°08′15″E		1334425	Upload Photo	Q26619092
Grotto Approximately 30 Metres South East of Langton Grove	II	Langton Green			12 February 1998	TM1442274833; 52°19′47″N 1°08′44″E		1334427	Upload Photo	Q26619094
Grotto Approximately 40 Metres South South East of Langton Grove	II	Langton Green			12 February 1998	TM1441074806; 52°19′46″N 1°08′43″E		1334428	Upload Photo	Q26619095
Langton Grove	II	Langton Green			15 June 1951	TM1438374847; 52°19′47″N 1°08′42″E		1334426	Upload Photo	Q26619093
Oak Cottage	II	Langton Green			20 October 1971	TM1450474801; 52°19′46″N 1°08′48″E		1334429	Upload Photo	Q26619096
1 and 3, Lowgate Street	II	1 and 3, Lowgate Street			12 February 1998	TM1457373695; 52°19′10″N 1°08′49″E		1334430	Upload Photo	Q26619097
2, Lowgate Street	II	2, Lowgate Street			12 February 1998	TM1455173689; 52°19′10″N 1°08′48″E		1334431	Upload Photo	Q26619098
4, Lowgate Street	II	4, Lowgate Street			12 February 1998	TM1455873686; 52°19′10″N 1°08′48″E		1334386	4, Lowgate Street More images	Q26619054
6, Lowgate Street	II	6, Lowgate Street			12 February 1998	TM1455973677; 52°19′09″N 1°08′48″E		1334387	6, Lowgate Street More images	Q26619055
7-13, Lowgate Street	II	7-13, Lowgate Street			12 February 1998	TM1458673674; 52°19′09″N 1°08′50″E		1334388	Upload Photo	Q26619056
15 and 17, Lowgate Street	II	15 and 17, Lowgate Street			12 February 1998	TM1459473661; 52°19′09″N 1°08′50″E		1334389	Upload Photo	Q26619057
23 and 25, Lowgate Street	II	23 and 25, Lowgate Street			12 February 1998	TM1464273663; 52°19′09″N 1°08′52″E		1334390	Upload Photo	Q26619058
Magdalen House	II	3, Magdalen Street			15 June 1951	TM1446473767; 52°19′12″N 1°08′43″E		1334391	Upload Photo	Q26619059
Endways	II	5, Magdalen Street			20 October 1971	TM1443273757; 52°19′12″N 1°08′42″E		1334392	Upload Photo	Q26619060
14 and 16, Magdalen Street	II	14 and 16, Magdalen Street			12 February 1998	TM1439773777; 52°19′13″N 1°08′40″E		1334393	Upload Photo	Q26619061
18, 20 and 22, Magdalen Street	II	18, 20 and 22, Magdalen Street			20 October 1971	TM1437973776; 52°19′13″N 1°08′39″E		1334394	Upload Photo	Q26619062
Mulberry House	II	24, Magdalen Street			15 June 1951	TM1440273801; 52°19′13″N 1°08′40″E		1334395	Upload Photo	Q26619063
Garden House Approximately 15 Metres North of Number 24 Mulberry House	II	Magdalen Street			20 October 1971	TM1440073818; 52°19′14″N 1°08′40″E		1334396	Upload Photo	Q26619064
Barn at Moor Hall Farm (moor Hall Farm Not Included)	II*	Moor Hall Causeway			12 February 1998	TM1430873161; 52°18′53″N 1°08′34″E		1334397	Upload Photo	Q17539835
Eye Park	II	Park Lane, IP23 7JA	house		15 June 1951	TM1463772333; 52°18′26″N 1°08′49″E		1334398	Eye Park More images	Q26619065
The Coach House	II	Park Lane, IP23 7JA			15 June 1951	TM1465272311; 52°18′25″N 1°08′50″E		1334399	Upload Photo	Q26619066
Cross House Including Front Railings	II	9, The Cross			20 October 1971	TM1449373853; 52°19′15″N 1°08′45″E		1334400	Upload Photo	Q26619067
10 and 11, the Cross	II	10 and 11, The Cross			20 October 1971	TM1450673851; 52°19′15″N 1°08′46″E		1334401	10 and 11, the Cross	Q26619068
10a, the Cross	II	10a, The Cross			20 October 1971	TM1450773860; 52°19′15″N 1°08′46″E		1334402	Upload Photo	Q26619069
1, 2 and 3, the Rookery	II	1, 2 and 3, The Rookery			20 October 1971	TM1471873673; 52°19′09″N 1°08′57″E		1334403	Upload Photo	Q26619070
Rookery House	II	The Rookery			15 June 1951	TM1470873650; 52°19′08″N 1°08′56″E		1334404	Upload Photo	Q26619071
Apsley Cottage	II	2, Wellington Road			15 June 1951	TM1449274033; 52°19′21″N 1°08′45″E		1334405	Upload Photo	Q26619072
35 and 36, Wellington Road	II	35 and 36, Wellington Road			12 February 1998	TM1473773906; 52°19′16″N 1°08′58″E		1096779	Upload Photo	Q26389049
Bedingfield Lodge	II	Wellington Road			15 June 1951	TM1447874032; 52°19′21″N 1°08′45″E		1096780	Upload Photo	Q26389050
Rook Hall	II	Yaxley Road			15 June 1951	TM1323372766; 52°18′42″N 1°07′36″E		1096781	Upload Photo	Q26389051
Rook Hall Barn	II*	Yaxley Road, IP23 7DN			20 August 2024	TM1318572737; 52°18′41″N 1°07′34″E		1490391	Upload Photo	Q17641032

== See also ==
- Grade I listed buildings in Suffolk
- Grade II* listed buildings in Suffolk

== Sources ==
- Bettely, James; Pevsner, Nikolaus (2015) [1961], Suffolk: West, The Buildings of England, New Haven and London: Yale University Press, ISBN 978-0-300-19655-9
