= Listed buildings in Fressingfield =

Historic structures in Suffolk, England

Fressingfield is a village and civil parish in the Mid Suffolk District of Suffolk, England. It contains 58 listed buildings that are recorded in the National Heritage List for England. Of these two are grade I, five are grade II* and 51 are grade II.

This list is based on the information retrieved online from Historic England.

== Key ==
Grade	Criteria
I	Buildings that are of exceptional interest
II*	Particularly important buildings of more than special interest
II	Buildings that are of special interest

== Listing ==
Name	Grade	Location	Type	Completed (Note: The date given is the date used by Historic England as significant for the initial building or that of an important part in the structure's description.)	Date designated	Grid ref. (Note: The grid reference is based on the British national grid reference system, sometimes known as OSGB36, used by the Ordnance Survey.) Geo-coordinates	Notes	Entry number (Note: The "List Entry Number" is a unique number assigned to each listed building and scheduled monument by Historic England.)	Image	Wikidata
Barn 40 Metres West of Hill House	II				29 July 1955	TM2701278258; 52°21′19″N 1°19′56″E		1032959	Upload Photo	Q26284412
Barn Approximately 50 Metres West South West of Church Farm Stable	II*				3 June 1997	TM2601777580; 52°20′59″N 1°19′02″E		1245363	Upload Photo	Q17539155
Barn 60 Metres East of Whittingham Hall	II				21 October 1987	TM2799878129; 52°21′14″N 1°20′48″E		1284832	Upload Photo	Q26573571
Fressingfield Hall	II*				29 July 1955	TM2665777657; 52°21′00″N 1°19′36″E		1352192	Upload Photo	Q17539956
Fressingfield Lodge	II				21 October 1987	TM2746979129; 52°21′47″N 1°20′22″E		1032957	Upload Photo	Q26284410
Hill House	II				29 July 1955	TM2705878252; 52°21′19″N 1°19′58″E		1032958	Upload Photo	Q26284411
K6 Telephone Kiosk Near the Guildhall	II				15 March 1989	TM2607977441; 52°20′54″N 1°19′05″E		1240803	Upload Photo	Q26533703
Manor Farmhouse	II				29 July 1955	TM2635875976; 52°20′06″N 1°19′16″E		1032960	Upload Photo	Q26284413
Moat Farmhouse	II				21 October 1987	TM2704675429; 52°19′48″N 1°19′51″E		1032961	Upload Photo	Q26284414
Oxbridge Farmhouse	II				29 July 1955	TM2617975957; 52°20′06″N 1°19′06″E		1032962	Upload Photo	Q26284416
Pinkney's Farmhouse	II				21 October 1987	TM2652278777; 52°21′37″N 1°19′31″E		1032963	Upload Photo	Q26284417
Whittingham Hall	II				29 July 1955	TM2793278128; 52°21′14″N 1°20′44″E		1032964	Upload Photo	Q26284418
Church House	II	Back Road			29 July 1955	TM2605677513; 52°20′57″N 1°19′04″E		1032966	Upload Photo	Q26284420
Farriers	II	Back Road			21 October 1987	TM2611377624; 52°21′00″N 1°19′07″E		1032965	Upload Photo	Q26284419
Knoll House	II	Back Road			21 October 1987	TM2608877608; 52°21′00″N 1°19′06″E		1352193	Upload Photo	Q26635229
Richmond House	II	Back Road			29 July 1955	TM2609477578; 52°20′59″N 1°19′06″E		1181802	Upload Photo	Q26477097
Stable 80 Metres North of Church Farmhouse	I	Back Road			29 July 1955	TM2605777600; 52°20′59″N 1°19′04″E		1181804	Upload Photo	Q17526222
The Fox and Goose	II*	Back Road	pub		29 July 1955	TM2611477453; 52°20′55″N 1°19′07″E		1032967	The Fox and Goose More images	Q17535746
Rookery Farmhouse	II	Chippebhall Green			21 October 1987	TM2835875544; 52°19′50″N 1°21′00″E		1284835	Upload Photo	Q26573574
Mill Green House	II	Chippenhall Green			21 October 1987	TM2861675612; 52°19′51″N 1°21′14″E		1352194	Upload Photo	Q26635230
The Old Jolly Farmers	II	Chippenhall Green			21 October 1987	TM2883476275; 52°20′12″N 1°21′27″E		1284838	Upload Photo	Q26573577
Willow Farmhouse	II	Chippenhall Green			21 October 1987	TM2898876042; 52°20′05″N 1°21′35″E		1032968	Upload Photo	Q26284421
Church of St Peter and St Paul	I	Church Street	church building		29 July 1955	TM2615577483; 52°20′55″N 1°19′09″E		1181830	Church of St Peter and St Paul More images	Q17526226
Hemm Dinn and Cherrywood	II	Church Street, IP21 5PA			21 October 1987	TM2607777376; 52°20′52″N 1°19′04″E		1181855	Upload Photo	Q26477144
Providence House	II	Church Street			21 October 1987	TM2615177437; 52°20′54″N 1°19′08″E		1181849	Upload Photo	Q26477139
Tomb of Archbishop Sancroft	II	Church Street			21 October 1987	TM2614777474; 52°20′55″N 1°19′08″E		1352155	Upload Photo	Q26635194
Vine Cottage	II	Church Street			21 October 1987	TM2612977392; 52°20′53″N 1°19′07″E		1032969	Upload Photo	Q26284422
Ivydene	II	Cratfield Road, Little Whittingham Green			21 October 1987	TM2813077159; 52°20′42″N 1°20′52″E		1032932	Upload Photo	Q26284381
Watsons Farmhouse	II	Cratfield Road, Little Whittingham Green			21 October 1987	TM2902076831; 52°20′30″N 1°21′38″E		1284754	Upload Photo	Q26573499
Yewtree Farmhouse	II	Cratfield Road			21 October 1987	TM2848076671; 52°20′26″N 1°21′09″E		1352180	Upload Photo	Q26635218
Elm Tree Farmhouse	II	Dale Road			21 October 1987	TM2509778755; 52°21′38″N 1°18′16″E		1181870	Upload Photo	Q26477157
Vales Hall	II	Dale Road			21 October 1987	TM2534378763; 52°21′38″N 1°18′29″E		1352156	Upload Photo	Q26635195
Fressingfield War Memorial Cross	II	Harleston Hill, IP21 5PE	war memorial		6 March 2018	TM2613777602; 52°20′59″N 1°19′08″E		1453718	Fressingfield War Memorial Cross More images	Q66479415
Barn 30 Metres North East of Ufford Hall	II	Laxfield Road			21 October 1987	TM2728774644; 52°19′22″N 1°20′02″E		1352179	Upload Photo	Q26635217
Chippenhall Hall	II	Laxfield Road			29 July 1955	TM2810075967; 52°20′04″N 1°20′48″E		1032928	Upload Photo	Q26284376
Oldcott	II	Laxfield Road			21 October 1987	TM2616877341; 52°20′51″N 1°19′09″E		1352176	Upload Photo	Q26635214
Pear Tree House	II	Laxfield Road			29 July 1955	TM2785374802; 52°19′26″N 1°20′32″E		1032929	Upload Photo	Q26284378
Tithe Farmhouse	II*	Laxfield Road			21 October 1987	TM2680777038; 52°20′40″N 1°19′42″E		1032927	Upload Photo	Q17535718
Two Cottages 300 Metres South East of Tithe Farmhouse	II	Laxfield Road			21 October 1987	TM2702076834; 52°20′33″N 1°19′53″E		1352177	Upload Photo	Q26635215
Ufford Hall	II*	Laxfield Road	manor house		29 July 1955	TM2727574605; 52°19′21″N 1°20′01″E		1032930	Ufford Hall More images	Q7877528
Whitepost Farmhouse	II	Laxfield Road			29 July 1955	TM2750775434; 52°19′47″N 1°20′15″E		1352178	Upload Photo	Q26635216
Barbers Farmhouse	II	Little Whittingham Green			29 July 1955	TM2851877129; 52°20′41″N 1°21′13″E		1032931	Upload Photo	Q26284379
Gissings Farmhouse	II	Little Whittingham Green			29 July 1955	TM2900877289; 52°20′45″N 1°21′39″E		1284783	Upload Photo	Q26573527
Baptist Chapel	II	Low Road			21 October 1987	TM2631177436; 52°20′54″N 1°19′17″E		1032934	Upload Photo	Q26284383
Bridge Cottage	II	Low Road			29 July 1955	TM2629077520; 52°20′56″N 1°19′16″E		1181998	Upload Photo	Q26477276
Street Farmhouse	II	Low Road			21 October 1987	TM2640777376; 52°20′52″N 1°19′22″E		1284734	Upload Photo	Q26573479
The Lodge	II	Low Road			21 October 1987	TM2615677587; 52°20′59″N 1°19′09″E		1032933	Upload Photo	Q26284382
The Vicarage	II	Low Road			29 July 1955	TM2622277583; 52°20′59″N 1°19′13″E		1352181	Upload Photo	Q26635219
Willow House	II	Low Road			29 July 1955	TM2615777643; 52°21′01″N 1°19′09″E		1181991	Upload Photo	Q26477269
Barn 25 Metres North of Metfieldlane Farmhouse	II	Metfield Lane			21 October 1987	TM2834978778; 52°21′34″N 1°21′08″E		1182027	Upload Photo	Q26477305
Metfieldlane Farmhouse	II	Metfield Lane			21 October 1987	TM2835178746; 52°21′33″N 1°21′08″E		1352182	Upload Photo	Q26635220
Wakelyns Farmhouse	II	Metfield Lane			21 October 1987	TM2874378909; 52°21′38″N 1°21′29″E		1032935	Upload Photo	Q26284385
Ladymeade	II	New Street			21 October 1987	TM2575477329; 52°20′51″N 1°18′47″E		1284707	Upload Photo	Q26573454
Mount Pleasant	II	New Street			21 October 1987	TM2565777303; 52°20′50″N 1°18′42″E		1032936	Upload Photo	Q26284386
Whitehouse Farmhouse	II	New Street			21 October 1987	TM2524177189; 52°20′47″N 1°18′20″E		1182044	Upload Photo	Q26477322
Priory House	II	Priory Road			21 October 1987	TM2561376987; 52°20′40″N 1°18′39″E		1182048	Upload Photo	Q26477326
Prospect House	II	Priory Road			24 January 1984	TM2563677241; 52°20′48″N 1°18′41″E		1032937	Upload Photo	Q26284387
Knights Farmhouse	II	Weybread Road			21 October 1987	TM2640278443; 52°21′26″N 1°19′24″E		1032938	Upload Photo	Q26284388

== See also ==
- Grade I listed buildings in Suffolk
- Grade II* listed buildings in Suffolk

== Sources ==
- Bettely, James; Pevsner, Nikolaus (2015) [1961], Suffolk: West, The Buildings of England, New Haven and London: Yale University Press, ISBN 978-0-300-19655-9
