= Listed buildings in Stowmarket =

Civil Parish in Suffolk, England

Stowmarket is a town and civil parish in the Mid Suffolk District of Suffolk, England. It contains 132 listed buildings that are recorded in the National Heritage List for England. Of these one is grade I, nine are grade II* and 122 are grade II.

This list is based on the information retrieved online from Historic England.

== Key ==
Grade	Criteria
I	Buildings that are of exceptional interest
II*	Particularly important buildings of more than special interest
II	Buildings that are of special interest

== Listing ==
Name	Grade	Location	Type	Completed (Note: The date given is the date used by Historic England as significant for the initial building or that of an important part in the structure's description.)	Date designated	Grid ref. (Note: The grid reference is based on the British national grid reference system, sometimes known as OSGB36, used by the Ordnance Survey.) Geo-coordinates	Notes	Entry number (Note: The "List Entry Number" is a unique number assigned to each listed building and scheduled monument by Historic England.)	Image	Wikidata
8-10 and 12 Market Place	II	8-10 and 12 Market Place, IP14 1DP			19 April 1972	TM0483858641; 52°11′17″N 0°59′43″E		1209495	Upload Photo	Q26504557
Museum of East Anglian Life Tithe Barn	II*				28 July 1950	TM0471958506; 52°11′12″N 0°59′36″E		1195880	Upload Photo	Q17536264
Stowmarket War Memorial Gates	II	IP14 1JP	war memorial		19 May 2017	TM0441258691; 52°11′19″N 0°59′20″E		1441772	Stowmarket War Memorial Gates More images	Q66478375
Albert Mill	II	Bond Street			23 September 1993	TM0490859135; 52°11′33″N 0°59′47″E		1195881	Upload Photo	Q26490444
Bury Lodge	II	13, Bury Road			19 April 1972	TM0471459136; 52°11′33″N 0°59′37″E		1297922	Upload Photo	Q26585456
1 and 3, Bury Street	II	1 and 3, Bury Street			19 April 1972	TM0484058689; 52°11′18″N 0°59′43″E		1195882	Upload Photo	Q26490445
6 and 8, Bury Street	II	6 and 8, Bury Street			19 April 1972	TM0486158696; 52°11′18″N 0°59′44″E		1297923	Upload Photo	Q26585457
9 and 11, Bury Street	II	9 and 11, Bury Street			19 April 1972	TM0483858702; 52°11′19″N 0°59′43″E		1195883	Upload Photo	Q26490446
13, Bury Street	II	13, Bury Street			28 July 1950	TM0483758712; 52°11′19″N 0°59′43″E		1195884	Upload Photo	Q26490447
15, 17 and 19, Bury Street	II	15, 17 and 19, Bury Street			28 July 1950	TM0483858721; 52°11′19″N 0°59′43″E		1208361	Upload Photo	Q26503440
21, 21a and 23, Bury Street	II	21, 21a and 23, Bury Street			19 April 1972	TM0484158741; 52°11′20″N 0°59′43″E		1195885	Upload Photo	Q26490448
22, 22a and 24, Bury Street	II	22, 22a and 24, Bury Street			19 April 1972	TM0486858773; 52°11′21″N 0°59′44″E		1208415	Upload Photo	Q26503494
25, Bury Street	II	25, Bury Street			28 July 1950	TM0483958752; 52°11′20″N 0°59′43″E		1297925	Upload Photo	Q26585459
26, Bury Street	II	26, Bury Street			19 April 1972	TM0485158786; 52°11′21″N 0°59′44″E		1208418	Upload Photo	Q26503497
27, Bury Street	II	27, Bury Street			28 July 1950	TM0482358757; 52°11′20″N 0°59′42″E		1195886	Upload Photo	Q26490449
33, 35 and 35a, Bury Street	II	33, 35 and 35a, Bury Street			19 April 1972	TM0483658777; 52°11′21″N 0°59′43″E		1208431	Upload Photo	Q26503507
37, Bury Street	II	37, Bury Street			19 April 1972	TM0483058784; 52°11′21″N 0°59′43″E		1293163	Upload Photo	Q26581121
Denmark House	II	41, Bury Street			28 July 1950	TM0482658804; 52°11′22″N 0°59′42″E		1297926	Upload Photo	Q26585460
48-56, Bury Street	II	48-56, Bury Street			19 April 1972	TM0481758868; 52°11′24″N 0°59′42″E		1293132	Upload Photo	Q26581090
82 and 84, Bury Street	II	82 and 84, Bury Street			19 April 1972	TM0482158931; 52°11′26″N 0°59′42″E		1195887	Upload Photo	Q26490450
88, Bury Street	II	88, Bury Street			28 July 1950	TM0479358928; 52°11′26″N 0°59′41″E		1293136	Upload Photo	Q26581094
Pot of Flowers	II	92, Bury Street			19 April 1972	TM0479058945; 52°11′27″N 0°59′41″E		1195888	Upload Photo	Q26490451
Mayes	II	94 and 98, Bury Street			19 April 1972	TM0478958959; 52°11′27″N 0°59′41″E		1293140	Upload Photo	Q26581098
100, Bury Street	II	100, Bury Street			28 July 1950	TM0478758970; 52°11′27″N 0°59′41″E		1195889	Upload Photo	Q26490452
101, Bury Street	II	101, Bury Street			19 April 1972	TM0476059028; 52°11′29″N 0°59′39″E		1293108	Upload Photo	Q26581067
102 and 104, Bury Street	II	102 and 104, Bury Street			19 April 1972	TM0478458984; 52°11′28″N 0°59′41″E		1195890	Upload Photo	Q26490453
103, Bury Street	II	103, Bury Street			19 April 1972	TM0475859034; 52°11′29″N 0°59′39″E		1208543	Upload Photo	Q26503612
10a, Bury Street	II	10a, Bury Street			19 April 1972	TM0485758711; 52°11′19″N 0°59′44″E		1297924	Upload Photo	Q26585458
Bethesda Chapel	II	Bury Street			28 July 1950	TM0483658910; 52°11′25″N 0°59′43″E		1293096	Upload Photo	Q26581056
1, Buttermarket	II	1, Buttermarket			19 April 1972	TM0487258654; 52°11′17″N 0°59′44″E		1195891	Upload Photo	Q26490454
2, 4 and 6, Buttermarket	II	2, 4 and 6, Buttermarket			28 July 1950	TM0489758648; 52°11′17″N 0°59′46″E		1208555	Upload Photo	Q26503624
3 and 5, Buttermarket	II	3 and 5, Buttermarket			28 July 1950	TM0488458657; 52°11′17″N 0°59′45″E		1195892	Upload Photo	Q26490455
7, Church Walk	II	7, Church Walk			19 April 1972	TM0499958646; 52°11′17″N 0°59′51″E		1208610	Upload Photo	Q26503683
14 and 15, Church Walk	II	14 and 15, Church Walk			19 April 1972	TM0500658664; 52°11′17″N 0°59′52″E		1195893	Upload Photo	Q26490456
16 and 17, Church Walk	II	16 and 17, Church Walk			19 April 1972	TM0500458668; 52°11′17″N 0°59′51″E		1208615	Upload Photo	Q26503688
18-26, Church Walk	II	18-26, Church Walk			19 April 1972	TM0498858687; 52°11′18″N 0°59′51″E		1195894	Upload Photo	Q26490457
Church of St Peter and St Mary	I	Church Walk	church building		28 July 1950	TM0492058680; 52°11′18″N 0°59′47″E		1208624	Church of St Peter and St Mary More images	Q17526279
Church of St Peter and St Mary Group of 4 Chest Tombs South of Nave	II	Church Walk			29 November 1993	TM0492658641; 52°11′17″N 0°59′47″E		1297887	Upload Photo	Q26585425
Church of St Peter and St Mary Monument 6 Metres South East of Chancel	II	Church Walk			29 November 1993	TM0495358672; 52°11′17″N 0°59′49″E		1208667	Upload Photo	Q26503736
Church of St Peter and St Mary: Monument 20 Metres South East of Chancel	II	Church Walk			29 November 1993	TM0496958658; 52°11′17″N 0°59′50″E		1195895	Upload Photo	Q26490458
10 and 11, Combs Ford, Stowmarket	II	10 and 11, Combs Ford			19 April 1972	TM0504757816; 52°10′50″N 0°59′52″E		1292929	Upload Photo	Q26580903
Oakwood	II	18, Combs Lane			19 April 1972	TM0493057714; 52°10′47″N 0°59′45″E		1208676	Upload Photo	Q26503746
22, Combs Lane	II	22, Combs Lane			19 April 1972	TM0491257710; 52°10′46″N 0°59′44″E		1208686	Upload Photo	Q26503757
Valley Farmhouse	II*	Combs Lane			28 July 1950	TM0437757917; 52°10′54″N 0°59′17″E		1195896	Upload Photo	Q17536270
Valley Farmhouse Barn Approximately 20 Metres South	II	Combs Lane			25 September 1989	TM0437757887; 52°10′53″N 0°59′17″E		1208693	Upload Photo	Q26503763
Sheepcote Hall	II	Creeting Road			9 December 1955	TM0636458627; 52°11′14″N 1°01′03″E		1297888	Upload Photo	Q26585426
Sheepcote Hall Stables and Hayloft 10 Metres East	II	Creeting Road			15 May 1990	TM0638858642; 52°11′15″N 1°01′04″E		1195897	Upload Photo	Q26490459
Walnut Tree Cottage	II	Creeting Road			10 July 1990	TM0624658701; 52°11′17″N 1°00′57″E		1208727	Upload Photo	Q26503798
6 and 8, Crowe Street	II	6 and 8, Crowe Street			28 July 1950	TM0481758585; 52°11′15″N 0°59′41″E		1195856	Upload Photo	Q26490422
10, Crowe Street	II	10, Crowe Street			28 July 1950	TM0481458568; 52°11′14″N 0°59′41″E		1297909	Upload Photo	Q26585444
12, Crowe Street	II	12, Crowe Street			28 July 1950	TM0481058563; 52°11′14″N 0°59′41″E		1195857	Upload Photo	Q26490423
14, Crowe Street	II	14, Crowe Street			19 April 1972	TM0480658554; 52°11′14″N 0°59′41″E		1297910	Upload Photo	Q26585445
18 and 20, Crowe Street	II	18 and 20, Crowe Street			28 July 1950	TM0479658543; 52°11′14″N 0°59′40″E		1195858	Upload Photo	Q26490424
Abbot's Hall	II*	Crowe Street			28 July 1950	TM0476858430; 52°11′10″N 0°59′38″E		1195859	Upload Photo	Q17536243
Abbot's Hall Enclosed Garden Walls and Attached Greenhouse	II	Crowe Street			19 April 1972	TM0480858428; 52°11′10″N 0°59′41″E		1297911	Upload Photo	Q26585446
Abbot's Hall Fishing Lodge	II	Crowe Street			28 July 1950	TM0470258351; 52°11′07″N 0°59′35″E		1195860	Upload Photo	Q26490425
Abbot's Hall Stables	II	Crowe Street			29 November 1993	TM0473758458; 52°11′11″N 0°59′37″E		1297912	Upload Photo	Q26585447
Wellington House	II	2, Finborough Road			28 July 1950	TM0468558739; 52°11′20″N 0°59′35″E		1208799	Upload Photo	Q26503872
The Firs	II	81, Finborough Road			19 April 1972	TM0423158605; 52°11′16″N 0°59′11″E		1195861	Upload Photo	Q26490426
Stowmarket Council School Memorial Drinking Fountain	II	Finborough Road, IP14 1PN			20 February 2017	TM0441058706; 52°11′19″N 0°59′20″E		1442348	Upload Photo	Q66478457
The Magpie Inn	II	1, Ford	inn		28 July 1950	TM0503657748; 52°10′48″N 0°59′51″E		1208839	The Magpie Inn More images	Q26503909
3, Ford (see Details for Further Address Information)	II	3, Ford			28 July 1950	TM0505157770; 52°10′48″N 0°59′52″E		1297913	Upload Photo	Q26585448
Chilton Court	II	Gainsborough Road			28 July 1950	TM0393959195; 52°11′36″N 0°58′57″E		1195862	Upload Photo	Q26490427
Chilton Hall	II	Holst Mead			28 July 1950	TM0401559524; 52°11′46″N 0°59′01″E		1208861	Upload Photo	Q26503928
Chilton Hall Barn	II	Holst Mead			19 April 1972	TM0401459616; 52°11′49″N 0°59′01″E		1195863	Upload Photo	Q26490428
The Limes	II	27, Ipswich Road			28 July 1950	TM0516558313; 52°11′06″N 0°59′59″E		1292946	Upload Photo	Q26580918
Verandah Cottage	II	29, Ipswich Road			28 July 1950	TM0517358268; 52°11′04″N 0°59′59″E		1297914	Upload Photo	Q26585449
Ford Millhouse	II	48, Ipswich Road			28 July 1950	TM0511657952; 52°10′54″N 0°59′56″E		1208896	Upload Photo	Q26503962
1 and 3, Ipswich Street	II	1 and 3, Ipswich Street			19 April 1972	TM0488758598; 52°11′15″N 0°59′45″E		1208919	Upload Photo	Q26503982
4 and 6, Ipswich Street	II	4 and 6, Ipswich Street			19 April 1972	TM0487858574; 52°11′14″N 0°59′45″E		1195864	Upload Photo	Q26490429
5, Ipswich Street	II	5, Ipswich Street			19 April 1972	TM0489158593; 52°11′15″N 0°59′45″E		1208941	Upload Photo	Q26504002
7, Ipswich Street	II	7, Ipswich Street			19 April 1972	TM0489758590; 52°11′15″N 0°59′46″E		1297915	Upload Photo	Q26585450
23, Ipswich Street	II	23, Ipswich Street			19 April 1972	TM0495558556; 52°11′14″N 0°59′49″E		1208973	Upload Photo	Q26504033
25, Ipswich Street	II	25, Ipswich Street			19 April 1972	TM0496358551; 52°11′14″N 0°59′49″E		1195865	Upload Photo	Q26490430
Old Fox Hotel	II	27, Ipswich Street	hotel		28 July 1950	TM0497258547; 52°11′13″N 0°59′49″E		1355044	Old Fox Hotel More images	Q26637938
31 and 31a, Ipswich Street	II	31 and 31a, Ipswich Street			19 April 1972	TM0499358532; 52°11′13″N 0°59′51″E		1195866	Upload Photo	Q26490431
33 and 33a, Ipswich Street	II	33 and 33a, Ipswich Street			28 July 1950	TM0499658528; 52°11′13″N 0°59′51″E		1209009	Upload Photo	Q26504065
Royal Oak Public House	II	43, Ipswich Street	pub		19 April 1972	TM0502858515; 52°11′12″N 0°59′52″E		1195867	Royal Oak Public House More images	Q26490432
67, Ipswich Street	II	67, Ipswich Street			19 April 1972	TM0509158439; 52°11′10″N 0°59′55″E		1209013	Upload Photo	Q26504069
69, Ipswich Street	II	69, Ipswich Street			28 July 1950	TM0509758430; 52°11′09″N 0°59′56″E		1195868	Upload Photo	Q26490433
Old Malthouse	II	129, Ipswich Street			19 April 1972	TM0522258362; 52°11′07″N 1°00′02″E		1209019	Upload Photo	Q26504078
The Duke's Head Inn	II	Ipswich Street			28 July 1950	TM0506958420; 52°11′09″N 0°59′54″E		1292858	Upload Photo	Q26580841
13, Marriot's Walk (see Details for Further Address Information)	II	1, Kensington Road			28 July 1950	TM0488458490; 52°11′12″N 0°59′45″E		1195869	Upload Photo	Q26490434
1 and 1a, Market Place	II	1 and 1a, Market Place			19 April 1972	TM0485458658; 52°11′17″N 0°59′44″E		1292861	Upload Photo	Q26580844
3, Market Place (corner Shop)	II	3, Market Place, IP14 1DT			28 July 1950	TM0485558643; 52°11′17″N 0°59′44″E		1209493	Upload Photo	Q26504555
3, Market Place (north Part)	II	3, Market Place, IP14 1DT			28 July 1950	TM0485458649; 52°11′17″N 0°59′43″E		1209488	Upload Photo	Q26504550
4 and 6, Market Place	II	4 and 6, Market Place			19 April 1972	TM0483558654; 52°11′17″N 0°59′43″E		1195871	Upload Photo	Q26490436
5, Market Place	II	5, Market Place, IP14 1DT			28 July 1950	TM0486458647; 52°11′17″N 0°59′44″E		1195872	Upload Photo	Q26490437
14, Market Place	II	14, Market Place			28 July 1950	TM0483558631; 52°11′16″N 0°59′42″E		1297916	Upload Photo	Q26585451
Former Nat West Bank	II	Market Place, IP14 1YY			19 April 1972	TM0488258618; 52°11′16″N 0°59′45″E		1292624	Upload Photo	Q26580627
Council Offices and Oak Cottage	II	1, 3 and 5, Milton Road			28 July 1950	TM0505358536; 52°11′13″N 0°59′54″E		1292591	Upload Photo	Q26580597
2 and 4, Needham Road	II	2 and 4, Needham Road			28 July 1950	TM0505957731; 52°10′47″N 0°59′52″E		1195873	Upload Photo	Q26490438
28, Needham Road	II	28, Needham Road			19 April 1972	TM0522857711; 52°10′46″N 1°00′01″E		1292609	Upload Photo	Q26580613
Oak Cottage	II	30, Needham Road			28 July 1950	TM0523857721; 52°10′46″N 1°00′02″E		1195874	Upload Photo	Q26490439
The Willows	II	59, Needham Road			19 April 1972	TM0538457763; 52°10′48″N 1°00′09″E		1209550	Upload Photo	Q26504612
Old Timbers	II	65, Needham Road			19 April 1972	TM0540057764; 52°10′48″N 1°00′10″E		1297917	Upload Photo	Q26585452
The Cedars Hotel	II*	Needham Road	hotel		28 July 1950	TM0584557485; 52°10′38″N 1°00′33″E		1209561	The Cedars Hotel More images	Q17538946
The Meadlands Public House	II*	Needham Road			19 April 1972	TM0571357725; 52°10′46″N 1°00′27″E		1195875	Upload Photo	Q17536253
The Ashes	II	Newton Road			15 September 1988	TM0507259540; 52°11′45″N 0°59′57″E		1292587	Upload Photo	Q26580593
Chelsea Cottage	II	Pound Lane			28 July 1950	TM0485559255; 52°11′36″N 0°59′45″E		1297918	Upload Photo	Q26585453
Methodist Church	II	Regent Street			19 April 1972	TM0495858954; 52°11′27″N 0°59′50″E		1292564	Upload Photo	Q26580571
Queen's Head Public House	II	1, Station Road	pub		29 November 1993	TM0488358696; 52°11′18″N 0°59′45″E		1195876	Queen's Head Public House More images	Q26490440
Gipping House	II	2, Station Road			19 April 1972	TM0486158661; 52°11′17″N 0°59′44″E		1292567	Upload Photo	Q26580573
3, Station Road	II*	3, Station Road			19 April 1972	TM0488958704; 52°11′19″N 0°59′45″E		1297869	Upload Photo	Q17539645
7, 9 and 9a, Station Road	II	7, 9 and 9a, Station Road			28 July 1950	TM0490858716; 52°11′19″N 0°59′46″E		1195939	Upload Photo	Q26490500
Lynton House	II*	10, Station Road	house		28 July 1950	TM0498658732; 52°11′19″N 0°59′51″E		1209660	Lynton House More images	Q17538973
11 and 13, Station Road	II	11 and 13, Station Road			19 April 1972	TM0492058723; 52°11′19″N 0°59′47″E		1195940	Upload Photo	Q26490501
19 and 19a, Station Road	II	19 and 19a, Station Road			19 April 1972	TM0495658743; 52°11′20″N 0°59′49″E		1209662	Upload Photo	Q26504718
Stowmarket Railway Station	II	Station Road	railway station		19 April 1972	TM0516758857; 52°11′23″N 1°00′00″E		1292513	Stowmarket Railway Station More images	Q2618103
The Maltings	II	Station Road			19 April 1972	TM0509758766; 52°11′20″N 0°59′57″E		1292516	Upload Photo	Q26580523
Laburnham Cottage	II	Stowupland Road, IP14 5AW			19 April 1972	TM0556059260; 52°11′36″N 1°00′22″E		1297870	Upload Photo	Q26585413
Uplands	II	Stowupland Road			28 July 1950	TM0540359265; 52°11′36″N 1°00′14″E		1195941	Upload Photo	Q26490502
18, Stowupland Street	II	18, Stowupland Street			19 April 1972	TM0498358803; 52°11′22″N 0°59′51″E		1209671	Upload Photo	Q26504728
22, 24, 26 and 26a, Stowupland Street	II	22, 24, 26 and 26a, Stowupland Street			19 April 1972	TM0497058837; 52°11′23″N 0°59′50″E		1209695	Upload Photo	Q26504755
35 and 37, Stowupland Street	II	35 and 37, Stowupland Street			4 October 1988	TM0496058873; 52°11′24″N 0°59′50″E		1297871	Upload Photo	Q26585414
39 and 41, Stowupland Street	II	39 and 41, Stowupland Street			4 October 1988	TM0496458879; 52°11′24″N 0°59′50″E		1209700	Upload Photo	Q26504759
47 and 49, Stowupland Street	II	47 and 49, Stowupland Street			19 April 1972	TM0498158889; 52°11′24″N 0°59′51″E		1195942	Upload Photo	Q26490503
61 and 63, Stowupland Street	II	61 and 63, Stowupland Street			28 July 1950	TM0503758915; 52°11′25″N 0°59′54″E		1209704	Upload Photo	Q26504762
The Pickerel Inn	II	65, Stowupland Street	pub		28 July 1952	TM0505058920; 52°11′25″N 0°59′54″E		1297872	The Pickerel Inn More images	Q26585415
The Stricklands	II*	Stricklands Road			28 July 1950	TM0493358396; 52°11′09″N 0°59′47″E		1209708	Upload Photo	Q17539007
2 Market Place and 1 Tavern Street	II	1, Tavern Street			28 July 1950	TM0483058666; 52°11′17″N 0°59′42″E		1195870	Upload Photo	Q26490435
Number 3 and Attached Workshop	II	3, Tavern Street			19 April 1972	TM0480758669; 52°11′18″N 0°59′41″E		1195943	Upload Photo	Q26490504
5, Tavern Street	II	5, Tavern Street			19 April 1972	TM0478958671; 52°11′18″N 0°59′40″E		1209732	Upload Photo	Q26504784
7 and 9, Tavern Street	II	7 and 9, Tavern Street			19 April 1972	TM0477958676; 52°11′18″N 0°59′40″E		1195944	Upload Photo	Q26490505
12 and 14, Tavern Street	II	12 and 14, Tavern Street			28 July 1950	TM0476558700; 52°11′19″N 0°59′39″E		1209763	Upload Photo	Q26504813
Marsden House	II	13, Tavern Street			19 April 1972	TM0476558680; 52°11′18″N 0°59′39″E		1209752	Upload Photo	Q26504804
The Rookery	II*	15 and 15a, Tavern Street			28 July 1950	TM0475058681; 52°11′18″N 0°59′38″E		1297873	Upload Photo	Q17539662
16 and 18, Tavern Street	II	16 and 18, Tavern Street			28 July 1950	TM0474758706; 52°11′19″N 0°59′38″E		1292459	Upload Photo	Q26580471
Stow House	II	20, Tavern Street			28 July 1950	TM0473058715; 52°11′19″N 0°59′37″E		1195945	Upload Photo	Q26490506
86, Union Street	II	86, Union Street			19 April 1972	TM0495758904; 52°11′25″N 0°59′49″E		1209807	Upload Photo	Q26504855
34 and 36, Violet Hill Road	II	34 and 36, Violet Hill Road			29 November 1993	TM0461058998; 52°11′28″N 0°59′31″E		1297874	Upload Photo	Q26585416

== See also ==
- Grade I listed buildings in Suffolk
- Grade II* listed buildings in Suffolk

== Sources ==
- Bettely, James; Pevsner, Nikolaus (2015) [1961], Suffolk: West, The Buildings of England, New Haven and London: Yale University Press, ISBN 978-0-300-19655-9
