= Listed buildings in Walsham-le-Willows =

Civil Parish in Suffolk, England

Walsham-le-Willows is a village and civil parish in the Mid Suffolk District of Suffolk, England. It contains 66 listed buildings that are recorded in the National Heritage List for England. Of these one is grade I and 65 are grade II.

This list is based on the information retrieved online from Historic England.

== Key ==
Grade	Criteria
I	Buildings that are of exceptional interest
II*	Particularly important buildings of more than special interest
II	Buildings that are of special interest

== Listing ==
Name	Grade	Location	Type	Completed (Note: The date given is the date used by Historic England as significant for the initial building or that of an important part in the structure's description.)	Date designated	Grid ref. (Note: The grid reference is based on the British national grid reference system, sometimes known as OSGB36, used by the Ordnance Survey.) Geo-coordinates	Notes	Entry number (Note: The "List Entry Number" is a unique number assigned to each listed building and scheduled monument by Historic England.)	Image	Wikidata
Thatched Cottage and the Thumb Bit	II	Badwell Road			15 July 1988	TL9997170546; 52°17′48″N 0°55′52″E		1352529	Upload Photo	Q26635536
Cranmer Farmhouse	II	Cranmer Green			15 November 1954	TM0163371428; 52°18′14″N 0°57′22″E		1352551	Upload Photo	Q26635556
Granmer Lodge	II	Cranmer Green			15 November 1954	TM0211471302; 52°18′09″N 0°57′47″E		1032179	Upload Photo	Q26283558
Green Farmhouse	II	Cranmer Green			15 November 1954	TM0195771317; 52°18′10″N 0°57′38″E		1032180	Upload Photo	Q26283559
High Hall	II	Cranmer Green			15 July 1988	TM0259871652; 52°18′20″N 0°58′13″E		1352552	Upload Photo	Q26635557
Old Hall	II	Cranmer Green			15 July 1988	TM0263471234; 52°18′07″N 0°58′14″E		1032178	Upload Photo	Q26283557
Sunnyside House	II	Cranmer Green			15 July 1988	TM0205171375; 52°18′12″N 0°57′43″E		1032177	Upload Photo	Q26283556
Crownland Hall	II	Crownland Road			15 November 1954	TM0096470194; 52°17′35″N 0°56′44″E		1032181	Upload Photo	Q26283560
Crownlands Cottage	II	Crownland Road			15 July 1988	TM0040070468; 52°17′45″N 0°56′14″E		1352514	Upload Photo	Q26635524
Fir Tree Farmhouse	II	Crownland Road			15 July 1988	TM0158070123; 52°17′32″N 0°57′16″E		1032182	Upload Photo	Q26283562
Riding Farmhouse	II	Crownland Road			15 July 1988	TM0146070134; 52°17′33″N 0°57′10″E		1284694	Upload Photo	Q26573441
Fernside	II	Finningham Road			15 July 1988	TM0055671288; 52°18′11″N 0°56′24″E		1032183	Upload Photo	Q26283563
The Rookery	II	Finningham Road			15 November 1954	TM0056671476; 52°18′17″N 0°56′25″E		1182112	Upload Photo	Q26477387
The Woodlands	II	Finningham Road			15 July 1988	TM0094271271; 52°18′10″N 0°56′45″E		1182133	Upload Photo	Q26477407
Townhouse	II	Finningham Road			15 July 1988	TM0080871203; 52°18′08″N 0°56′38″E		1032184	Upload Photo	Q26283564
Four Ashes Farmhouse	II	Four Ashes			15 July 1988	TM0007570567; 52°17′48″N 0°55′58″E		1032186	Upload Photo	Q26283566
The Elms	II	Four Ashes			15 July 1988	TM0000470618; 52°17′50″N 0°55′54″E		1032185	Upload Photo	Q26283565
Stable Block to the Grove	II	Grove Road			15 July 1988	TM0028471012; 52°18′03″N 0°56′10″E		1182177	Upload Photo	Q26477447
The Beeches	II	Grove Road			15 July 1988	TM0003671111; 52°18′06″N 0°55′57″E		1182169	Upload Photo	Q26477440
The Grove	II	Grove Road			15 November 1954	TM0028370948; 52°18′00″N 0°56′09″E		1032187	Upload Photo	Q26283567
Four Ashes	II	Palmer Street			15 July 1988	TM0028670687; 52°17′52″N 0°56′09″E		1032188	Upload Photo	Q26283568
Grove Cottage	II	Palmer Street			4 August 1993	TM0040770754; 52°17′54″N 0°56′15″E		1372424	Upload Photo	Q26653547
The Old Vicarage	II	Palmer Street			15 July 1988	TM0038270661; 52°17′51″N 0°56′14″E		1284652	Upload Photo	Q26573403
Willow Tree Farmhouse	II	Palmer Street			15 July 1988	TM0053170759; 52°17′54″N 0°56′22″E		1032189	Upload Photo	Q26283570
Walsham Le Willows War Memorial	II	St Mary's Churchyard, The Causeway, Walsham Le Willows, IP31 3AB	war memorial		6 November 2020	TL9995271115; 52°18′06″N 0°55′52″E		1470504	Walsham Le Willows War Memorial More images	Q101411828
Fishpond Farmhouse	II	Summer Road			15 July 1988	TM0013472361; 52°18′46″N 0°56′04″E		1182295	Upload Photo	Q26477556
Hall House	II	Summer Road			15 November 1954	TL9989271341; 52°18′14″N 0°55′50″E		1182288	Upload Photo	Q26477550
Sandpits Farmhouse	II	Summer Road			15 July 1988	TL9965371706; 52°18′26″N 0°55′38″E		1352519	Upload Photo	Q26635529
Number 12 (robins Nest), Number 14 and Number 16	II	Number 14 And Number 16, The Causeway			15 July 1988	TM0002670872; 52°17′58″N 0°55′56″E		1032176	Upload Photo	Q26283555
Brook Cottage	II	The Causeway			15 July 1988	TL9997671060; 52°18′04″N 0°55′53″E		1352530	Upload Photo	Q26635537
Church Farmhouse	II	The Causeway			15 July 1988	TL9991771108; 52°18′06″N 0°55′50″E		1181984	Upload Photo	Q26477262
Church Rise	II	The Causeway			15 July 1988	TL9995571053; 52°18′04″N 0°55′52″E		1032219	Upload Photo	Q26283603
Priors Close	II	The Causeway			15 November 1954	TL9998371050; 52°18′04″N 0°55′54″E		1284750	Upload Photo	Q26573495
Sweetbriars	II	The Causeway			15 April 1954	TL9991071164; 52°18′08″N 0°55′50″E		1032218	Upload Photo	Q26283602
The Old Sunday School (parish Room)	II	The Causeway			15 July 1988	TL9997171075; 52°18′05″N 0°55′53″E		1032217	Upload Photo	Q26283601
The Priory	II	The Causeway			15 April 1954	TM0000971098; 52°18′06″N 0°55′55″E		1284775	Upload Photo	Q26573519
1, 2 and 3 Guildhall	II	1, The Street			15 November 1954	TL9998171201; 52°18′09″N 0°55′54″E		1032192	Upload Photo	Q26283574
Bank House	II	The Street			15 July 1988	TM0035471270; 52°18′11″N 0°56′14″E		1032191	Upload Photo	Q26283573
Church of St Mary	I	The Street	church building		15 November 1954	TL9997471111; 52°18′06″N 0°55′53″E		1182197	Church of St Mary More images	Q17526239
Clive Cottage	II	The Street			15 July 1988	TM0016571215; 52°18′09″N 0°56′04″E		1182222	Upload Photo	Q26477485
Maltings House	II	The Street			7 February 1973	TM0043171332; 52°18′13″N 0°56′18″E		1032195	Upload Photo	Q26283578
Riverside Cottage	II	The Street			15 July 1988	TM0032271287; 52°18′11″N 0°56′12″E		1284636	Upload Photo	Q26573388
Sideways	II	The Street			15 July 1988	TM0021371271; 52°18′11″N 0°56′06″E		1284614	Upload Photo	Q26573366
South View	II	The Street			15 July 1988	TL9995471195; 52°18′09″N 0°55′53″E		1352516	Upload Photo	Q26635526
The Blue Boar Public House	II	The Street	pub		15 July 1988	TM0001071170; 52°18′08″N 0°55′55″E		1352515	The Blue Boar Public House More images	Q26635525
The Chestnuts	II	The Street			15 November 1954	TM0030471330; 52°18′13″N 0°56′11″E		1182278	Upload Photo	Q26477540
The Dages	II	The Street			15 November 1954	TM0000171204; 52°18′09″N 0°55′55″E		1182246	Upload Photo	Q26477509
The Old Stores	II	The Street			8 October 1976	TM0001971208; 52°18′09″N 0°55′56″E		1352517	Upload Photo	Q26635527
The Six Bells Public House	II	The Street	pub		15 November 1954	TL9994171198; 52°18′09″N 0°55′52″E		1182236	The Six Bells Public House More images	Q26477499
The Tiled House	II	The Street			15 July 1988	TM0007371235; 52°18′10″N 0°55′59″E		1032193	Upload Photo	Q26283575
Thornfield	II	The Street			15 November 1954	TM0020071242; 52°18′10″N 0°56′06″E		1032190	Upload Photo	Q26283571
United Reformed Church	II	The Street	church building		15 July 1988	TM0023771295; 52°18′12″N 0°56′08″E		1352518	United Reformed Church More images	Q26635528
Village Hall	II	The Street			17 April 1989	TM0014171225; 52°18′10″N 0°56′02″E		1252331	Upload Photo	Q26544209
White House	II	The Street			17 September 1976	TM0010771238; 52°18′10″N 0°56′01″E		1032194	Upload Photo	Q26283576
Willow Cottage	II	The Street	thatched cottage		15 July 1988	TM0008971227; 52°18′10″N 0°56′00″E		1182265	Willow Cottage More images	Q26477527
Yew Tree Cottage	II	The Street			15 July 1988	TM0003071212; 52°18′09″N 0°55′57″E		1182250	Upload Photo	Q26477513
Animal Pound	II	Townhouse Road			3 October 2000	TM0083770945; 52°18′00″N 0°56′39″E		1385377	Upload Photo	Q26665164
Barn Approximately 30 Metres North of West House	II	West Street			29 June 1998	TL9858670790; 52°17′58″N 0°54′40″E		1334418	Upload Photo	Q26619085
Brook Farm Cottages	II	West Street			15 July 1988	TL9911971237; 52°18′11″N 0°55′09″E		1182365	Upload Photo	Q26477619
Home Farmhouse	II	West Street			15 November 1954	TL9859970873; 52°18′00″N 0°54′40″E		1182306	Upload Photo	Q26477566
Lawn Cottage	II	West Street			25 April 1978	TL9912071180; 52°18′09″N 0°55′09″E		1352540	Upload Photo	Q26635547
Premises of Mr D J Cobbold	II	West Street			15 July 1988	TL9864570938; 52°18′02″N 0°54′43″E		1352520	Upload Photo	Q26635530
The Lawn	II	West Street			15 July 1988	TL9906771143; 52°18′08″N 0°55′06″E		1284603	Upload Photo	Q26573357
West Cottage	II	West Street			15 July 1988	TL9863671054; 52°18′06″N 0°54′43″E		1182321	Upload Photo	Q26477579
West House	II	West Street			15 July 1988	TL9857870735; 52°17′56″N 0°54′39″E		1032196	Upload Photo	Q26283579
West Street Farmhouse	II	West Street			15 July 1988	TL9859970988; 52°18′04″N 0°54′41″E		1032197	Upload Photo	Q26283580

== See also ==
- Grade I listed buildings in Suffolk
- Grade II* listed buildings in Suffolk

== Sources ==
- Bettely, James; Pevsner, Nikolaus (2015) [1961], Suffolk: West, The Buildings of England, New Haven and London: Yale University Press, ISBN 978-0-300-19655-9
