= Listed buildings in Rattlesden =

Historic structures in Suffolk, England

Rattlesden is a village and civil parish in the Mid Suffolk District of Suffolk, England. It contains 59 listed buildings that are recorded in the National Heritage List for England. Of these one is grade I, one is grade II* and 57 are grade II.

This list is based on the information retrieved online from Historic England.

== Key ==
Grade	Criteria
I	Buildings that are of exceptional interest
II*	Particularly important buildings of more than special interest
II	Buildings that are of special interest

== Listing ==
Name	Grade	Location	Type	Completed (Note: The date given is the date used by Historic England as significant for the initial building or that of an important part in the structure's description.)	Date designated	Grid ref. (Note: The grid reference is based on the British national grid reference system, sometimes known as OSGB36, used by the Ordnance Survey.) Geo-coordinates	Notes	Entry number (Note: The "List Entry Number" is a unique number assigned to each listed building and scheduled monument by Historic England.)	Image	Wikidata
Stable Range, Aligned East/west, 10 Metres North East of Brook Farmhouse	II	Aligned East/west, 10 Metres North East Of Brook Farmhouse, Brettingham Road			18 April 1988	TL9700257999; 52°11′06″N 0°52′49″E		1032601	Upload Photo	Q26284019
Rustice Cottage	II	Baby Lane			18 April 1988	TL9749757396; 52°10′46″N 0°53′14″E		1285297	Upload Photo	Q26574002
The Nest	II	8, 9 and 10, Birds Green			18 April 1988	TL9796159018; 52°11′38″N 0°53′42″E		1032599	Upload Photo	Q26284016
11 and 12, Birds Green	II	11 and 12, Birds Green			18 April 1988	TL9797759036; 52°11′38″N 0°53′43″E		1180879	Upload Photo	Q26476206
13 and 14, Birds Green	II	13 and 14, Birds Green			18 April 1988	TL9800958980; 52°11′37″N 0°53′44″E		1032600	Upload Photo	Q26284018
La Reve Win's Cottage	II	Birds Green			18 April 1988	TL9794659014; 52°11′38″N 0°53′41″E		1285273	Upload Photo	Q26573980
Lydgate Cottage Micawber Cottage Teasel Cottage	II	Birds Green			18 April 1988	TL9791258997; 52°11′37″N 0°53′39″E		1285267	Upload Photo	Q26573974
The Cygnets	II	Birds Green			18 April 1988	TL9792359005; 52°11′37″N 0°53′40″E		1032598	Upload Photo	Q26284015
Turners Taxis	II	Birds Green			15 November 1954	TL9788358971; 52°11′36″N 0°53′38″E		1032597	Upload Photo	Q26284014
Tower Mill, 350 Metres South East of White House	II	350 Metres South East Of White House, Brettenham Road			18 April 1988	TL9679258260; 52°11′15″N 0°52′39″E		1180890	Upload Photo	Q26476217
Barn, 20 Metres East of Brook Farmhouse	II	20 Metres East Of Brook Farmhouse, Brettingham Road			18 April 1988	TL9701457974; 52°11′05″N 0°52′50″E		1180921	Upload Photo	Q26476254
Barkers Farmhouse	II	Brettingham Road			18 April 1988	TL9678557929; 52°11′04″N 0°52′38″E		1352335	Upload Photo	Q26635364
Brook Farmhouse	II	Brettingham Road			15 November 1954	TL9698357986; 52°11′06″N 0°52′48″E		1352334	Upload Photo	Q26635363
Fen Farmhouse	II	Brettingham Road			18 April 1988	TL9719755180; 52°09′35″N 0°52′54″E		1180943	Upload Photo	Q26476283
Fengate Farmhouse	II	Brettingham Road			18 April 1988	TL9728254980; 52°09′28″N 0°52′58″E		1032602	Upload Photo	Q26284020
The Firs	II	Church Walk			18 April 1988	TL9782059002; 52°11′38″N 0°53′34″E		1180984	Upload Photo	Q26476325
Tween	II	Church Walk			18 April 1988	TL9781459001; 52°11′37″N 0°53′34″E		1352336	Upload Photo	Q26635365
Two Houses Immediately West of Tween	II	Church Walk			18 April 1988	TL9780658997; 52°11′37″N 0°53′34″E		1285217	Upload Photo	Q26573929
Clopton Hall	II	Clopton Green			15 November 1954	TL9839459936; 52°12′07″N 0°54′06″E		1032603	Upload Photo	Q26284021
Pegg's Farmhouse	II	Drinkstone Road			18 April 1988	TL9702759339; 52°11′49″N 0°52′53″E		1285184	Upload Photo	Q26573898
Peggs Cottage	II	Drinkstone Road			18 April 1988	TL9706559305; 52°11′48″N 0°52′55″E		1032604	Upload Photo	Q26284022
Stable, 50 Metres South West of White House	II	50 Metres South West Of White House, Felsham Road			18 April 1988	TL9645058454; 52°11′22″N 0°52′21″E		1181031	Upload Photo	Q26476379
Barn, 80 Metres South West of White House	II	80 Metres South West Of White House, Felsham Road			18 April 1988	TL9642558439; 52°11′21″N 0°52′20″E		1352337	Upload Photo	Q26635366
White House	II	Felsham Road			18 April 1988	TL9650358490; 52°11′23″N 0°52′24″E		1285185	Upload Photo	Q26573899
Friars Hall	II	Hightown Green			18 April 1988	TL9716056841; 52°10′29″N 0°52′55″E		1032605	Upload Photo	Q26284023
Pantiles	II	Hightown Green			18 April 1988	TL9724656572; 52°10′20″N 0°52′59″E		1352338	Upload Photo	Q26635367
Punchards Farmhouse	II	Hightown Green			18 April 1988	TL9714656583; 52°10′20″N 0°52′54″E		1181042	Upload Photo	Q26476391
St Margarets Priory	II	Hightown Green			18 April 1988	TL9724856478; 52°10′17″N 0°52′59″E		1032606	Upload Photo	Q26284024
Barn, 30 Metres West of Malting Farmhouse	II	30 Metres West Of Malting Farmhouse, Holly Bush Lane, Hightown Green			18 April 1988	TL9709757114; 52°10′37″N 0°52′52″E		1181082	Upload Photo	Q26476426
Barn 50 Metres South of Hollybush Farmhouse	II	Holly Bush Lane, Hightown Green			18 April 1988	TL9648157313; 52°10′45″N 0°52′20″E		1181091	Upload Photo	Q26476435
Hollybush Farmhouse	II	Holly Bush Lane, Hightown Green			18 April 1988	TL9646057347; 52°10′46″N 0°52′19″E		1032607	Upload Photo	Q26284025
Stable 30 Metres South of Hollybush Farmhouse	II	Holly Bush Lane, Hightown Green			18 April 1988	TL9646557311; 52°10′45″N 0°52′20″E		1032566	Upload Photo	Q26283982
Unoccupied House, 170 Metres South of St Margaret's Priory	II	170 Metres South Of St Margaret's Priory, Louse Lane, Hightown Green			18 April 1988	TL9726556303; 52°10′11″N 0°52′59″E		1352358	Upload Photo	Q26635384
Model Farmhouse	II	Louse Lane, Hightown Green			18 April 1988	TL9772856248; 52°10′09″N 0°53′24″E		1032567	Upload Photo	Q26283984
Church Cottage	II*	Lower Street	cottage		15 November 1954	TL9784759027; 52°11′38″N 0°53′36″E		1352360	Church Cottage More images	Q17540056
Manor Cottage	II	Lower Street			18 April 1988	TL9786458924; 52°11′35″N 0°53′36″E		1352359	Upload Photo	Q26635385
The Brewers Arms Public House	II	Lower Street	pub		18 April 1988	TL9782758936; 52°11′35″N 0°53′35″E		1032568	The Brewers Arms Public House More images	Q26283985
The Nook	II	Lower Street			18 April 1988	TL9788158959; 52°11′36″N 0°53′37″E		1032569	Upload Photo	Q26283986
Willow Cottage	II	Lower Street			18 February 2002	TL9786659059; 52°11′39″N 0°53′37″E		1359599	Upload Photo	Q26641824
Cansell Grove Farmhouse	II	Poy Street Green			15 November 1954	TL9801258216; 52°11′12″N 0°53′43″E		1032570	Upload Photo	Q26283987
Limberlost	II	Poy Street Green			18 April 1988	TL9803858142; 52°11′09″N 0°53′44″E		1285136	Upload Photo	Q26573850
Tudor Grange	II	Poy Street Green			18 April 1988	TL9818758244; 52°11′13″N 0°53′52″E		1032571	Upload Photo	Q26283988
Walnut Tree Farmhouse	II	Poy Street Green			15 November 1954	TL9797757919; 52°11′02″N 0°53′40″E		1352362	Upload Photo	Q26635386
Bressumer Cottage	II	Poystreet Green			18 April 1988	TL9801758109; 52°11′08″N 0°53′43″E		1032572	Upload Photo	Q26283989
Barn, 50 Metres South West of Shelland Hall	II	50 Metres South West Of Shelland Hall, Shelland			21 September 1987	TL9945559714; 52°11′58″N 0°55′02″E		1032573	Upload Photo	Q26283990
Shelland Hall	II	Shelland			21 September 1987	TL9949959743; 52°11′59″N 0°55′04″E		1285102	Upload Photo	Q26573819
Brookvale Farmhouse	II	Stowmarket Road			18 April 1988	TL9852259378; 52°11′49″N 0°54′12″E		1181198	Upload Photo	Q26476533
Dawes Farmhouse	II	Stowmarket Road			18 April 1988	TL9899059297; 52°11′46″N 0°54′36″E		1032574	Upload Photo	Q26283991
Wood Hall	II	Stowmarket Road			18 April 1988	TL9929758905; 52°11′32″N 0°54′52″E		1032575	Upload Photo	Q26283992
1-3 Thatched Cottages	II	1-3, Thatched Cottages, Top Road, IP30 0SJ			18 April 1988	TL9737758443; 52°11′20″N 0°53′10″E		1032576	Upload Photo	Q26283993
Edgars Farmhouse	II	Top Road			18 April 1988	TL9760458320; 52°11′16″N 0°53′22″E		1181225	Upload Photo	Q26476559
House, 10 Metres East of Rose Cottage	II	10 Metres East Of Rose Cottage, Upper Street			18 April 1988	TL9765758957; 52°11′36″N 0°53′26″E		1032579	Upload Photo	Q26283997
Cartref Hall Cotttage	II	Upper Street			15 November 1954	TL9775859006; 52°11′38″N 0°53′31″E		1032578	Upload Photo	Q26283996
Church Cottage	II	Upper Street			18 April 1988	TL9774059041; 52°11′39″N 0°53′30″E		1181271	Upload Photo	Q26476598
Church of St Nicholas	I	Upper Street	church building		15 November 1954	TL9780559049; 52°11′39″N 0°53′34″E		1181243	Church of St Nicholas More images	Q17526183
Coldmartin	II	Upper Street			15 November 1954	TL9773658986; 52°11′37″N 0°53′30″E		1181281	Upload Photo	Q26476608
Rattlesden Hall	II	Upper Street			18 April 1988	TL9772859102; 52°11′41″N 0°53′30″E		1032577	Upload Photo	Q26283995
Francis Farmhouse	II	Woolpit Road, Clopton Green			18 April 1988	TL9767659830; 52°12′04″N 0°53′28″E		1181309	Upload Photo	Q26476635
Hill Farmhouse	II	Workhouse Lane			15 November 1954	TL9830358694; 52°11′27″N 0°53′59″E		1352363	Upload Photo	Q26635387

== See also ==
- Grade I listed buildings in Suffolk
- Grade II* listed buildings in Suffolk

== Sources ==
- Bettely, James; Pevsner, Nikolaus (2015) [1961], Suffolk: West, The Buildings of England, New Haven and London: Yale University Press, ISBN 978-0-300-19655-9
