= Listed buildings in Stradbroke =

Civil Parish in Suffolk, England

Stradbroke is a village and civil parish in the Mid Suffolk District of Suffolk, England. It contains 70 listed buildings that are recorded in the National Heritage List for England. Of these three are grade II* and 67 are grade II.

This list is based on the information retrieved online from Historic England.

== Key ==
Grade	Criteria
I	Buildings that are of exceptional interest
II*	Particularly important buildings of more than special interest
II	Buildings that are of special interest

== Listing ==
Name	Grade	Location	Type	Completed (Note: The date given is the date used by Historic England as significant for the initial building or that of an important part in the structure's description.)	Date designated	Grid ref. (Note: The grid reference is based on the British national grid reference system, sometimes known as OSGB36, used by the Ordnance Survey.) Geo-coordinates	Notes	Entry number (Note: The "List Entry Number" is a unique number assigned to each listed building and scheduled monument by Historic England.)	Image	Wikidata
Barn 450 Metres North East of Wilby Hall	II				18 December 1987	TM2638572591; 52°18′17″N 1°19′09″E		1032846	Upload Photo	Q26284286
Broad End Farmhouse	II*				29 July 1955	TM2626074357; 52°19′14″N 1°19′07″E		1032844	Upload Photo	Q17535659
Low Farmhouse	II				18 December 1987	TM2557474118; 52°19′08″N 1°18′30″E		1352218	Upload Photo	Q26635253
Manor Farmhouse	II				18 December 1987	TM2567474636; 52°19′24″N 1°18′37″E		1032845	Upload Photo	Q26284285
Pear Tree Farmhouse	II				18 December 1987	TM2598275140; 52°19′40″N 1°18′54″E		1181115	Upload Photo	Q26476456
Barne's Farmhouse	II	Battlesea Green			18 December 1987	TM2196475047; 52°19′43″N 1°15′22″E		1285111	Upload Photo	Q26573827
Battlesea Hall	II	Battlesea Green			29 July 1955	TM2163575316; 52°19′52″N 1°15′05″E		1032848	Upload Photo	Q26284288
Hill House Farmhouse	II*	Battlesea Green			29 July 1955	TM2258275410; 52°19′54″N 1°15′55″E		1181184	Upload Photo	Q17536061
Meadow Farmhouse	II	Battlesea Green			18 December 1987	TM2225075238; 52°19′49″N 1°15′37″E		1352220	Upload Photo	Q26635255
Town Close	II	1, Church Street			18 December 1987	TM2313373887; 52°19′04″N 1°16′21″E		1032850	Upload Photo	Q26284290
Church View	II	Church Street			18 December 1987	TM2317773913; 52°19′05″N 1°16′23″E		1032852	Upload Photo	Q26284292
Church of All Saints	II*	Church Street	church building		29 July 1955	TM2319173980; 52°19′07″N 1°16′24″E		1032854	Church of All Saints More images	Q17535670
Coppings Cottage	II	Church Street			18 December 1987	TM2308273901; 52°19′04″N 1°16′18″E		1032849	Upload Photo	Q26284289
Hartfield House	II	Church Street			29 July 1955	TM2320373914; 52°19′05″N 1°16′24″E		1285048	Upload Photo	Q26573771
K6 Kiosk	II	Church Street			25 November 1994	TM2317173941; 52°19′05″N 1°16′23″E		1252269	Upload Photo	Q26544153
Numbers 1 and 2 Town House and Town Cottage	II	Church Street			29 July 1955	TM2313773903; 52°19′04″N 1°16′21″E		1032851	Upload Photo	Q26284291
Old Builders Yard	II	Church Street			18 December 1987	TM2307273898; 52°19′04″N 1°16′18″E		1181233	Upload Photo	Q26476566
Stable Block Immediately East of White Hart Inn	II	Church Street			18 December 1987	TM2323173943; 52°19′05″N 1°16′26″E		1181345	Upload Photo	Q26476671
The Old Chemist's Shop	II	Church Street			29 July 1955	TM2312473892; 52°19′04″N 1°16′20″E		1181293	Upload Photo	Q26476620
Waterloo House	II	Church Street			29 July 1955	TM2316473907; 52°19′04″N 1°16′22″E		1181301	Upload Photo	Q26476627
White Hart Inn	II	Church Street	inn		29 July 1955	TM2320673931; 52°19′05″N 1°16′25″E		1032853	White Hart Inn More images	Q26284294
White House Farmhouse	II	Diss Road			18 December 1987	TM2299974647; 52°19′28″N 1°16′15″E		1181391	Upload Photo	Q26476713
Bye Ways and the Thatches	II	Doctors Lane			18 December 1987	TM2327573876; 52°19′03″N 1°16′28″E		1032855	Upload Photo	Q26284295
The Priory	II	Doctors Lane			18 December 1987	TM2325373781; 52°19′00″N 1°16′27″E		1181397	Upload Photo	Q26476719
Stradbroke War Memorial	II	Junction Of Church Street And Queen Street, IP21 5HX			11 May 2020	TM2316073939; 52°19′05″N 1°16′22″E		1470189	Upload Photo	Q97457682
Meadow Cottage	II	Kersley Hall Lane, Wootton Green			18 December 1987	TM2302872824; 52°18′30″N 1°16′13″E		1181599	Upload Photo	Q26476910
Barley Green Farmhouse	II	Laxfield Road, Barley Green			29 July 1955	TM2473473600; 52°18′52″N 1°17′44″E		1032847	Upload Photo	Q26284287
Lodge Farmhouse	II	Laxfield Road, Ashfield Green			18 December 1987	TM2568473440; 52°18′46″N 1°18′34″E		1181121	Upload Photo	Q26476462
Poplar Farmhouse	II	Laxfield Road, Ashfield Green			18 December 1987	TM2637873429; 52°18′44″N 1°19′11″E		1181167	Upload Photo	Q26476503
Street Farmhouse	II	Laxfield Road			18 December 1987	TM2350074021; 52°19′08″N 1°16′40″E		1032856	Upload Photo	Q26284296
White House Farmhouse	II	Laxfield Road, Ashfield Green			18 December 1987	TM2614873653; 52°18′52″N 1°18′59″E		1352219	Upload Photo	Q26685455
Barn 60 Metres South West of the Brooklands	II	Mill Lane			18 December 1987	TM2471974444; 52°19′19″N 1°17′46″E		1285003	Upload Photo	Q26573731
Chestnut Cottage	II	Neaves Lane, Wootton Green			18 December 1987	TM2344772923; 52°18′32″N 1°16′35″E		1352249	Upload Photo	Q26635282
Home Farmhouse	II	Neaves Lane			29 July 1955	TM2355073661; 52°18′56″N 1°16′42″E		1032857	Upload Photo	Q26284298
Horseshoe Farmhouse	II	Neaves Lane			18 December 1987	TM2319672927; 52°18′33″N 1°16′22″E		1181586	Upload Photo	Q26476898
3, New Street (see Details for Further Address Information)	II	2, New Street			18 September 1981	TM2284473838; 52°19′03″N 1°16′05″E		1181440	Upload Photo	Q26476759
Barn About 30 Metres West North West of Doggetts	II	New Street			21 August 1991	TM2253674084; 52°19′11″N 1°15′50″E		1181786	Upload Photo	Q26477083
Doggetts	II	New Street			18 December 1987	TM2257774072; 52°19′11″N 1°15′52″E		1032859	Upload Photo	Q26284300
Doggetts Farmhouse Garden Cottage	II	New Street			18 December 1987	TM2276773821; 52°19′02″N 1°16′01″E		1181450	Upload Photo	Q26476769
Fig Tree Cottage	II	New Street			18 December 1987	TM2264373768; 52°19′01″N 1°15′55″E		1284991	Upload Photo	Q26573719
New Street Farmhouse	II	New Street			18 December 1987	TM2279973793; 52°19′01″N 1°16′03″E		1352222	Upload Photo	Q26635257
The Cottage Farmhouse	II	New Street			18 December 1987	TM2287273849; 52°19′03″N 1°16′07″E		1032858	Upload Photo	Q26284299
The Maltings	II	New Street			18 December 1987	TM2293873871; 52°19′04″N 1°16′10″E		1181409	Upload Photo	Q26476730
The Old Doctor's House	II	New Street			29 July 1955	TM2289173858; 52°19′03″N 1°16′08″E		1352221	Upload Photo	Q26635256
Timbers	II	New Street			18 December 1987	TM2260273753; 52°19′00″N 1°15′52″E		1032860	Upload Photo	Q26284301
Valley Farmhouse	II	New Street			18 December 1987	TM2191173696; 52°18′59″N 1°15′16″E		1285001	Upload Photo	Q26573729
North Lane Farmhouse	II	North Lane, Pixey Green			18 December 1987	TM2526375766; 52°20′01″N 1°18′18″E		1181510	Upload Photo	Q26476828
Barn 25 Metres South East of Cheney Farmhouse	II	Pixey Green			18 December 1987	TM2556675511; 52°19′53″N 1°18′33″E		1032861	Upload Photo	Q26284302
Cheney Farmhouse	II	Pixey Green			18 December 1987	TM2552675519; 52°19′53″N 1°18′31″E		1181496	Upload Photo	Q26476814
Manor Grange	II	Pixey Green, IP21 5NJ			4 July 2006	TM2565774599; 52°19′23″N 1°18′36″E		1391709	Upload Photo	Q26671062
White House Farmhouse	II	Pixey Green			18 December 1987	TM2497875758; 52°20′01″N 1°18′03″E		1352223	Upload Photo	Q26893611
2 Cottages Immediately North of the Hemp Sheaf (occupied by Mr. Pearl and Mr. Browning)	II	2 Cottages Immediately North Of The Hemp Sheaf (occupied By Mr. Pearl And Mr. Browning), Queen Street			18 December 1987	TM2304074222; 52°19′15″N 1°16′17″E		1032824	Upload Photo	Q26284260
Church House	II	Queen Street			29 July 1955	TM2312573929; 52°19′05″N 1°16′20″E		1352224	Upload Photo	Q26635259
County Branch Library	II	Queen Street	public library		7 September 1981	TM2312774023; 52°19′08″N 1°16′21″E		1032822	County Branch Library More images	Q26284258
Grove Cottage	II	Queen Street			18 December 1987	TM2299574309; 52°19′18″N 1°16′14″E		1181558	Upload Photo	Q26476872
Grove Farmhouse	II	Queen Street			18 December 1987	TM2304874309; 52°19′18″N 1°16′17″E		1352248	Upload Photo	Q26635281
Hempsheaf House	II	Queen Street			18 December 1987	TM2304074199; 52°19′14″N 1°16′17″E		1352247	Upload Photo	Q26635280
Post Office	II	Queen Street			29 July 1955	TM2313073951; 52°19′06″N 1°16′21″E		1032819	Upload Photo	Q26284255
Ryle House	II	Queen Street, IP21 5HG	building		18 December 1987	TM2309274031; 52°19′08″N 1°16′19″E		1352246	Ryle House More images	Q26635279
Stradbroke Hall	II	Queen Street			29 July 1955	TM2309574214; 52°19′14″N 1°16′20″E		1284955	Upload Photo	Q26573686
Suffolk House and Country Flowers	II	Queen Street			29 July 1955	TM2306874087; 52°19′10″N 1°16′18″E		1032823	Upload Photo	Q26284259
The Chantry	II	Queen Street			19 July 1955	TM2315874010; 52°19′08″N 1°16′22″E		1352245	Upload Photo	Q26635278
Thirkettle Cottage and Harvest Cottage	II	Queen Street			29 July 1955	TM2310974005; 52°19′08″N 1°16′20″E		1032821	Upload Photo	Q26284257
Glenmore the Bakery	II	Queens Street			29 July 1955	TM2312273969; 52°19′06″N 1°16′20″E		1352244	Upload Photo	Q26635277
Hubbards	II	Queens Street, Eye			18 December 1987	TM2313973988; 52°19′07″N 1°16′21″E		1032820	Upload Photo	Q26284256
Broadway Hall	II	Verdons Lane			29 July 1955	TM2662674569; 52°19′21″N 1°19′27″E		1032825	Upload Photo	Q26284261
Bumble Cottage	II	Wilby Road			18 December 1987	TM2289173315; 52°18′46″N 1°16′07″E		1032826	Upload Photo	Q26284262
Hepwood Lodge Farmhouse	II	Wilby Road			19 July 1955	TM2272273078; 52°18′38″N 1°15′57″E		1284924	Upload Photo	Q26573658
High House	II	Wilby Road			18 December 1987	TM2317672738; 52°18′27″N 1°16′20″E		1032827	Upload Photo	Q26284264
The Ivy House	II	Wilby Road	thatched pub		18 December 1987	TM2307973833; 52°19′02″N 1°16′18″E		1181565	The Ivy House More images	Q26476879

== See also ==
- Grade I listed buildings in Suffolk
- Grade II* listed buildings in Suffolk

== Sources ==
- Bettely, James; Pevsner, Nikolaus (2015) [1961], Suffolk: West, The Buildings of England, New Haven and London: Yale University Press, ISBN 978-0-300-19655-9
