= List of United Kingdom locations: Litn-Liz =

The United Kingdom

This is part of the list of United Kingdom locations: a gazetteer of place names in the United Kingdom showing each place's locality and geographical coordinates.

== Lit (continued) ==
=== Little A ===
Location	Locality	Coordinates (links to map & photo sources)	OS grid reference
Little Abington	Cambridgeshire	52.11°N 00.23°E	TL5349
Little Addington	Northamptonshire	52.34°N 00.60°W	SP9573
Little Airmyn	North Yorkshire	53.71°N 00.91°W	SE7225
Little Almshoe	Hertfordshire	51.91°N 00.27°W	TL1925
Little Alne	Warwickshire	52.24°N 01.81°W	SP1361
Little Altcar	Sefton	53.54°N 03.05°W	SD3006
Little Ann	Hampshire	51.18°N 01.52°W	SU3343
Little Ansty (or Pleck)	Dorset	50.83°N 02.34°W	ST7604
Little Arowry	Wrexham	52.95°N 02.82°W	SJ4540
Little Asby	Cumbria	54.47°N 02.47°W	NY6909
Little Ashley	Wiltshire	51.35°N 02.27°W	ST8162
Little Aston	Staffordshire	52.59°N 01.86°W	SK0900
Little Atherfield	Isle of Wight	50.61°N 01.35°W	SZ4680
Little Ayton	North Yorkshire	54.48°N 01.12°W	NZ5710

=== Little B ===
Location	Locality	Coordinates (links to map & photo sources)	OS grid reference
Little Baddow	Essex	51.73°N 00.56°E	TL7707
Little Badminton	South Gloucestershire	51.55°N 02.28°W	ST8084
Little Ballinluig	Perth and Kinross	56.64°N 03.77°W	NN9152
Little Bampton	Cumbria	54.88°N 03.15°W	NY2655
Little Bardfield	Essex	51.94°N 00.39°E	TL6530
Little Barford	Bedfordshire	52.18°N 00.27°W	TL1856
Little Barningham	Norfolk	52.85°N 01.16°E	TG1333
Little Barrington	Gloucestershire	51.80°N 01.71°W	SP2012
Little Barrow	Cheshire	53.22°N 02.81°W	SJ4670
Little Barugh	North Yorkshire	54.20°N 00.83°W	SE7679
Little Bavington	Northumberland	55.09°N 02.03°W	NY9878
Little Bayham	East Sussex	51.10°N 00.32°E	TQ6336
Little Bealings	Suffolk	52.07°N 01.25°E	TM2347
Little Beckford	Worcestershire	52.00°N 02.04°W	SO9734
Little Bedwyn	Wiltshire	51.38°N 01.58°W	SU2965
Little Bentley	Essex	51.88°N 01.06°E	TM1125
Little Berkhamsted	Hertfordshire	51.75°N 00.13°W	TL2908
Little Bernera	Western Isles	58.26°N 06.87°W	NB142409
Little Billing	Northamptonshire	52.25°N 00.82°W	SP8062
Little Billington	Bedfordshire	51.88°N 00.64°W	SP9322
Little Birch	Herefordshire	51.97°N 02.71°W	SO5131
Little Bispham	Lancashire	53.86°N 03.05°W	SD3141
Little Blakenham	Suffolk	52.09°N 01.06°E	TM1048
Little Blencow	Cumbria	54.68°N 02.85°W	NY4532
Little Bloxwich	Walsall	52.62°N 02.00°W	SK0003
Little Bognor	West Sussex	50.97°N 00.57°W	TQ0020
Little Bolehill	Derbyshire	53.08°N 01.56°W	SK2954
Little Bollington	Cheshire	53.37°N 02.42°W	SJ7286
Little Bolton	Trafford	53.47°N 02.33°W	SJ7898
Little Bookham	Surrey	51.27°N 00.39°W	TQ1254
Littleborough	Devon	50.87°N 03.67°W	SS8210
Littleborough	Nottinghamshire	53.32°N 00.77°W	SK8282
Littleborough	Rochdale	53.64°N 02.10°W	SD9316
Little Bosullow	Cornwall	50.14°N 05.62°W	SW4133
Littlebourne	Kent	51.26°N 01.15°E	TR2057
Little Bourton	Oxfordshire	52.09°N 01.34°W	SP4544
Little Bowden	Leicestershire	52.47°N 00.91°W	SP7487
Little Boys Heath	Buckinghamshire	51.67°N 00.69°W	SU9098
Little Bradley	Suffolk	52.14°N 00.45°E	TL6852
Little Braithwaite	Cumbria	54.59°N 03.19°W	NY2323
Little Brampton	Shropshire	52.42°N 02.94°W	SO3681
Little Braxted	Essex	51.79°N 00.65°E	TL8314
Little Bray	Devon	51.09°N 03.88°W	SS6835
Little Brechin	Angus	56.74°N 02.68°W	NO5862
Littlebredy	Dorset	50.69°N 02.59°W	SY5889
Little Brickhill	Buckinghamshire	51.97°N 00.69°W	SP9032
Little Bridgeford	Staffordshire	52.84°N 02.19°W	SJ8727
Little Brington	Northamptonshire	52.26°N 01.03°W	SP6663
Little Bristol	South Gloucestershire	51.61°N 02.40°W	ST7291
Little Britain	Warwickshire	52.18°N 01.84°W	SP1154
Little Bromley	Essex	51.91°N 01.03°E	TM0928
Little Bromwich	Birmingham	52.47°N 01.85°W	SP1086
Little Broughton	Cumbria	54.66°N 03.44°W	NY0731
Little Budworth	Cheshire	53.18°N 02.61°W	SJ5965
Little Burstead	Essex	51.60°N 00.39°E	TQ6692
Littlebury	Essex	52.02°N 00.19°E	TL5139
Littlebury Green	Essex	52.02°N 00.15°E	TL4838
Little Bytham	Lincolnshire	52.74°N 00.50°W	TF0117

=== Little C ===
Location	Locality	Coordinates (links to map & photo sources)	OS grid reference
Little Cambridge	Essex	51.91°N 00.33°E	TL6127
Little Canford	Poole	50.79°N 01.94°W	SZ0499
Little Carleton	Lancashire	53.83°N 03.01°W	SD3338
Little Carlton	Lincolnshire	53.34°N 00.08°E	TF3985
Little Carlton	Nottinghamshire	53.10°N 00.85°W	SK7757
Little Casterton	Rutland	52.66°N 00.50°W	TF0109
Little Catwick	East Riding of Yorkshire	53.88°N 00.29°W	TA1244
Little Catworth	Cambridgeshire	52.33°N 00.38°W	TL1072
Little Cawthorpe	Lincolnshire	53.32°N 00.02°E	TF3583
Little Chalfield	Wiltshire	51.36°N 02.21°W	ST8563
Little Chalfont	Buckinghamshire	51.66°N 00.56°W	SU9997
Little Chart	Kent	51.18°N 00.77°E	TQ9446
Little Chart Forstal	Kent	51.17°N 00.78°E	TQ9545
Little Chell	City of Stoke-on-Trent	53.06°N 02.19°W	SJ8752
Little Chester	City of Derby	52.92°N 01.48°W	SK3537
Little Chesterford	Essex	52.04°N 00.20°E	TL5141
Little Chesterton	Oxfordshire	51.87°N 01.20°W	SP5520
Little Cheverell	Wiltshire	51.27°N 02.01°W	ST9953
Little Chishill	Cambridgeshire	52.01°N 00.05°E	TL4137
Little Clacton	Essex	51.82°N 01.13°E	TM1619
Little Clanfield	Oxfordshire	51.70°N 01.61°W	SP2701
Little Clegg	Rochdale	53.62°N 02.12°W	SD9214
Little Clifton	Cumbria	54.63°N 03.47°W	NY0528
Little Coates	North East Lincolnshire	53.55°N 00.12°W	TA2408
Little Colonsay	Argyll and Bute	56.44°N 06.26°W	NM375365
Little Comberton	Worcestershire	52.08°N 02.05°W	SO9643
Little Comfort	Cornwall	50.59°N 04.34°W	SX3480
Little Common	East Sussex	50.83°N 00.42°E	TQ7107
Little Common	Lincolnshire	52.82°N 00.01°W	TF3427
Little Common	Shropshire	52.38°N 02.89°W	SO3977
Little Common	West Sussex	50.98°N 00.66°W	SU9421
Little Compton	Warwickshire	51.96°N 01.62°W	SP2630
Little Corby	Cumbria	54.90°N 02.82°W	NY4757
Little Cornard	Suffolk	52.01°N 00.76°E	TL9039
Littlecote	Buckinghamshire	51.90°N 00.79°W	SP8324
Littlecott	Wiltshire	51.25°N 01.80°W	SU1451
Little Cowarne	Herefordshire	52.15°N 02.58°W	SO6051
Little Coxwell	Oxfordshire	51.63°N 01.59°W	SU2893
Little Crakehall	North Yorkshire	54.30°N 01.63°W	SE2490
Little Cransley	Northamptonshire	52.37°N 00.78°W	SP8376
Little Crawley	Milton Keynes	52.09°N 00.65°W	SP9245
Little Creaton	Northamptonshire	52.33°N 00.97°W	SP7071
Little Cressingham	Norfolk	52.56°N 00.75°E	TF8700
Little Crosby	Sefton	53.50°N 03.04°W	SD3101
Little Cubley	Derbyshire	52.93°N 01.76°W	SK1637
Little Cumbrae Isle	North Ayrshire	55.72°N 04.95°W	NS146513

=== Little D ===
Location	Locality	Coordinates (links to map & photo sources)	OS grid reference
Little Dalby	Leicestershire	52.71°N 00.86°W	SK7714
Little Dawley	Shropshire	52.65°N 02.47°W	SJ6806
Littledean	Gloucestershire	51.81°N 02.48°W	SO6713
Littledean Hill	Gloucestershire	51.82°N 02.49°W	SO6614
Little Dewchurch	Herefordshire	51.97°N 02.68°W	SO5331
Little Ditton	Cambridgeshire	52.19°N 00.42°E	TL6658
Little Doward	Herefordshire	51.84°N 02.66°W	SO5416
Littledown	Bournemouth	50.73°N 01.83°W	SZ1293
Little Down	Hampshire	51.31°N 01.51°W	SU3457
Little Downham	Cambridgeshire	52.42°N 00.23°E	TL5283
Little Drayton	Shropshire	52.89°N 02.50°W	SJ6633
Little Driffield	East Riding of Yorkshire	53.99°N 00.47°W	TA0057
Little Drybrook	Gloucestershire	51.76°N 02.59°W	SO5907
Little Dunham	Norfolk	52.67°N 00.74°E	TF8612
Little Dunkeld	Perth and Kinross	56.56°N 03.59°W	NO0242
Little Dunmow	Essex	51.86°N 00.39°E	TL6521
Little Durnford	Wiltshire	51.10°N 01.82°W	SU1234

=== Little E ===
Location	Locality	Coordinates (links to map & photo sources)	OS grid reference
Little Eastbury	Worcestershire	52.21°N 02.26°W	SO8257
Little Easton	Essex	51.88°N 00.32°E	TL6023
Little Eaton	Derbyshire	52.96°N 01.46°W	SK3641
Little Eccleston	Lancashire	53.85°N 02.89°W	SD4140
Little Ellingham	Norfolk	52.55°N 00.94°E	TM0099
Little End	Cambridgeshire	52.20°N 00.28°W	TL1758
Little End	East Riding of Yorkshire	53.83°N 00.78°W	SE8038
Little End	Essex	51.67°N 00.22°E	TL5400
Little Everdon	Northamptonshire	52.21°N 01.13°W	SP5958
Little Eversden	Cambridgeshire	52.15°N -00.00°E	TL3753

=== Little F ===
Location	Locality	Coordinates (links to map & photo sources)	OS grid reference
Little Faringdon	Oxfordshire	51.70°N 01.68°W	SP2201
Little Fencote	North Yorkshire	54.33°N 01.57°W	SE2893
Little Fenton	North Yorkshire	53.80°N 01.21°W	SE5235
Littleferry	Highland	57.92°N 04.02°W	NH8095
Littlefield	North East Lincolnshire	53.55°N 00.09°W	TA2608
Littlefield Common	Surrey	51.25°N 00.63°W	SU9552
Littlefield Green	Berkshire	51.47°N 00.77°W	SU8576
Little Finborough	Suffolk	52.14°N 00.95°E	TM0254
Little Fransham	Norfolk	52.67°N 00.80°E	TF9012
Little Frith	Kent	51.26°N 00.77°E	TQ9455

=== Little G ===
Location	Locality	Coordinates (links to map & photo sources)	OS grid reference
Little Gaddesden	Hertfordshire	51.80°N 00.56°W	SP9913
Littlegain	Shropshire	52.56°N 02.32°W	SO7896
Little Gidding	Cambridgeshire	52.41°N 00.35°W	TL1281
Little Glemham	Suffolk	52.17°N 01.42°E	TM3458
Little Gorsley	Herefordshire	51.92°N 02.46°W	SO6825
Little Gransden	Cambridgeshire	52.17°N 00.14°W	TL2755
Little Green	Cambridgeshire	52.08°N 00.13°W	TL2845
Little Green	Nottinghamshire	52.97°N 00.92°W	SK7243
Little Green	Somerset	51.23°N 02.40°W	ST7248
Little Green (Gislingham)	Suffolk	52.29°N 01.02°E	TM0671
Little Green (Burgate)	Suffolk	52.32°N 01.03°E	TM0774
Little Green	Wrexham	52.95°N 02.77°W	SJ4840
Little Grimsby	Lincolnshire	53.39°N 00.01°W	TF3291
Little Gringley	Nottinghamshire	53.31°N 00.90°W	SK7380

=== Little H ===
Location	Locality	Coordinates (links to map & photo sources)	OS grid reference
Little Habton	North Yorkshire	54.18°N 00.86°W	SE7477
Little Hadham	Hertfordshire	51.87°N 00.09°E	TL4422
Little Hale	Lincolnshire	52.95°N 00.30°W	TF1441
Little Hale	Norfolk	52.61°N 00.86°E	TF9406
Little Hallam	Derbyshire	52.95°N 01.31°W	SK4640
Little Hallingbury	Essex	51.83°N 00.17°E	TL5017
Littleham (Torridge)	Devon	50.98°N 04.23°W	SS4323
Littleham (Exmouth)	Devon	50.62°N 03.38°W	SY0281
Little Hampden	Buckinghamshire	51.71°N 00.75°W	SP8603
Littlehampton	West Sussex	50.80°N 00.55°W	TQ0202
Little Haresfield	Gloucestershire	51.77°N 02.29°W	SO8009
Little Harrowden	Northamptonshire	52.33°N 00.73°W	SP8671
Little Harwood	Lancashire	53.75°N 02.47°W	SD6929
Little Haseley	Oxfordshire	51.69°N 01.07°W	SP6400
Little Hatfield	East Riding of Yorkshire	53.87°N 00.22°W	TA1743
Little Hautbois	Norfolk	52.74°N 01.33°E	TG2521
Little Haven	Pembrokeshire	51.76°N 05.11°W	SM8512
Little Haven	West Sussex	51.07°N 00.31°W	TQ1832
Little Havra	Shetland Islands	60.02°N 01.37°W	HU351263
Little Hay	Staffordshire	52.61°N 01.82°W	SK1202
Little Hayfield	Derbyshire	53.38°N 01.95°W	SK0388
Little Haywood	Staffordshire	52.78°N 02.00°W	SK0021
Little Heath	Berkshire	51.45°N 01.06°W	SU6573
Little Heath (Christleton)	Cheshire	53.17°N 02.83°W	SJ4465
Little Heath (Audlem)	Cheshire	52.99°N 02.50°W	SJ6644
Little Heath	Coventry	52.43°N 01.50°W	SP3482
Little Heath (near Hemel Hempstead)	Hertfordshire	51.76°N 00.53°W	TL0108
Little Heath (near Potters Bar)	Hertfordshire	51.70°N 00.19°W	TL2502
Little Heath	Redbridge	51.57°N 00.11°E	TQ4788
Little Heath	Staffordshire	52.75°N 02.14°W	SJ9017
Little Heath	Surrey	51.32°N 00.37°W	TQ1360
Little Heck	North Yorkshire	53.69°N 01.10°W	SE5922
Littlehempston	Devon	50.44°N 03.67°W	SX8162
Little Henham	Essex	51.94°N 00.22°E	TL5330
Little Herbert's	Gloucestershire	51.86°N 02.05°W	SO9619
Little Hereford	Herefordshire	52.30°N 02.66°W	SO5568
Little Hill	Herefordshire	51.93°N 02.77°W	SO4727
Little Hill	Somerset	50.91°N 03.05°W	ST2613
Little Holbury	Hampshire	50.83°N 01.40°W	SU4204
Little Honeyborough	Pembrokeshire	51.71°N 04.96°W	SM9506
Little Hoole Moss Houses	Lancashire	53.70°N 02.78°W	SD4823
Little Horkesley	Essex	51.95°N 00.85°E	TL9632
Little Hormead	Hertfordshire	51.94°N 00.03°E	TL4029
Little Horsted	East Sussex	50.94°N 00.09°E	TQ4718
Little Horton	Bradford	53.77°N 01.77°W	SE1531
Little Horton	Wiltshire	51.35°N 01.94°W	SU0462
Little Horwood	Buckinghamshire	51.96°N 00.85°W	SP7930
Littlehoughton	Northumberland	55.43°N 01.63°W	NU2316
Little Houghton	Barnsley	53.54°N 01.36°W	SE4205
Little Houghton	Northamptonshire	52.22°N 00.83°W	SP8059
Little Hucklow	Derbyshire	53.29°N 01.76°W	SK1678
Little Hulton	Salford	53.52°N 02.42°W	SD7203
Little Hungerford	Berkshire	51.45°N 01.26°W	SU5173

=== Little I ===
Location	Locality	Coordinates (links to map & photo sources)	OS grid reference
Little Ilford	Newham	51.54°N 00.06°E	TQ4385
Little Ingestre	Staffordshire	52.81°N 02.01°W	SJ9924
Little Inkberrow	Worcestershire	52.21°N 02.00°W	SP0057
Little Irchester	Northamptonshire	52.28°N 00.68°W	SP9066

=== Little K ===
Location	Locality	Coordinates (links to map & photo sources)	OS grid reference
Little Kelk	East Riding of Yorkshire	54.03°N 00.32°W	TA1060
Little Keyford	Somerset	51.21°N 02.33°W	ST7746
Little Kimble	Buckinghamshire	51.75°N 00.81°W	SP8207
Little Kineton	Warwickshire	52.14°N 01.51°W	SP3350
Little Kingshill	Buckinghamshire	51.68°N 00.71°W	SU8999
Little Knowle	Devon	50.63°N 03.33°W	SY0682
Little Knowles Green	Suffolk	52.19°N 00.58°E	TL7758

=== Little L ===
Location	Locality	Coordinates (links to map & photo sources)	OS grid reference
Little Langdale	Cumbria	54.41°N 03.06°W	NY3103
Little Langford	Wiltshire	51.12°N 01.94°W	SU0436
Little Laver	Essex	51.75°N 00.23°E	TL5409
Little Lawford	Warwickshire	52.38°N 01.32°W	SP4677
Little Layton	Lancashire	53.82°N 03.03°W	SD3237
Little Leigh	Cheshire	53.27°N 02.58°W	SJ6175
Little Leighs	Essex	51.81°N 00.47°E	TL7116
Little Lepton	Kirklees	53.62°N 01.69°W	SE2014
Little Leven	East Riding of Yorkshire	53.88°N 00.32°W	TA1045
Little Lever	Bolton	53.55°N 02.37°W	SD7507
Little Limber	Lincolnshire	53.57°N 00.30°W	TA1210
Little Linford	Milton Keynes	52.08°N 00.77°W	SP8444
Little Linga	Shetland Islands	60.36°N 01.05°W	HU524650
Little Load	Somerset	51.01°N 02.77°W	ST4624
Little London	Bradford	53.84°N 01.69°W	SE2039
Little London (near Oakley)	Buckinghamshire	51.80°N 01.07°W	SP6412
Little London (near Wendover)	Buckinghamshire	51.73°N 00.75°W	SP8605
Little London	Cambridgeshire	52.54°N 00.07°E	TL4196
Little London	East Sussex	50.94°N 00.23°E	TQ5719
Little London (Berden)	Essex	51.94°N 00.13°E	TL4729
Little London (Finchingfield)	Essex	51.98°N 00.44°E	TL6835
Little London	Gloucestershire	51.86°N 02.43°W	SO7018
Little London (Andover)	Hampshire	51.23°N 01.47°W	SU3749
Little London (Tadley)	Hampshire	51.32°N 01.11°W	SU6259
Little London	City of Leeds	53.80°N 01.54°W	SE3034
Little London (Legsby)	Lincolnshire	53.35°N 00.28°W	TF1486
Little London (Spalding)	Lincolnshire	52.76°N 00.17°W	TF2320
Little London (Stallingborough)	Lincolnshire	53.592°N 0.208°W	TA187121
Little London (Tetford)	Lincolnshire	53.25°N 00.01°W	TF3375
Little London (Long Sutton)	Lincolnshire	52.78°N 00.11°E	TF4323
Little London (Corpusty)	Norfolk	52.82°N 01.11°E	TG1030
Little London (Marsham)	Norfolk	52.76°N 01.22°E	TG1823
Little London (Northwold)	Norfolk	52.53°N 00.59°E	TL7696
Little London (North Walsham)	Norfolk	52.82°N 01.39°E	TG2931
Little London	Oxfordshire	51.70°N 01.24°W	SP5201
Little London	Powys	52.49°N 03.41°W	SO0489
Little London	Shropshire	52.48°N 02.73°W	SO5088
Little London	Somerset	51.22°N 02.54°W	ST6247
Little London	Suffolk	52.15°N 00.98°E	TM0455
Little London	Worcestershire	52.33°N 02.54°W	SO6371
Little Longstone	Derbyshire	53.23°N 01.73°W	SK1871
Little Lyth	Shropshire	52.64°N 02.78°W	SJ4706

=== Little M ===
Location	Locality	Coordinates (links to map & photo sources)	OS grid reference
Little Madeley	Staffordshire	53.00°N 02.34°W	SJ7745
Little Malvern	Worcestershire	52.05°N 02.35°W	SO7640
Little Mancot	Flintshire	53.18°N 03.01°W	SJ3266
Little Maplestead	Essex	51.97°N 00.64°E	TL8234
Little Marcle	Herefordshire	52.02°N 02.48°W	SO6736
Little Marlow	Buckinghamshire	51.58°N 00.74°W	SU8788
Little Marsden	Lancashire	53.82°N 02.22°W	SD8537
Little Marsh	Buckinghamshire	51.90°N 01.05°W	SP6523
Little Marsh	Norfolk	52.90°N 00.97°E	TG0038
Little Marsh	Wiltshire	51.33°N 02.15°W	ST8959
Little Marton	Lancashire	53.79°N 03.00°W	SD3434
Little Mascalls	Essex	51.69°N 00.50°E	TL7302
Little Massingham	Norfolk	52.78°N 00.65°E	TF7924
Little Melton	Norfolk	52.60°N 01.18°E	TG1606
Little Merthyr	Herefordshire	52.12°N 03.08°W	SO2648
Little Milford	Pembrokeshire	51.76°N 04.95°W	SM9611
Little Mill	Kent	51.20°N 00.36°E	TQ6548
Little Mill	Torfaen	51.71°N 02.98°W	SO3202
Littlemill	East Ayrshire	55.40°N 04.44°W	NS4515
Littlemill	Highland	57.52°N 03.82°W	NH9150
Little Milton	Oxfordshire	51.69°N 01.11°W	SP6100
Little Minster	Oxfordshire	51.79°N 01.55°W	SP3111
Little Missenden	Buckinghamshire	51.67°N 00.67°W	SU9298
Little Mongeham	Kent	51.20°N 01.33°E	TR3350
Littlemoor	Derbyshire	53.16°N 01.46°W	SK3663
Littlemoor	Dorset	50.63°N 02.45°W	SY6882
Little Moor	Lancashire	53.85°N 02.39°W	SD7440
Little Moor	Stockport	53.39°N 02.13°W	SJ9189
Little Moor End	Lancashire	53.73°N 02.41°W	SD7327
Littlemore	Oxfordshire	51.71°N 01.23°W	SP5302
Little Morrell	Warwickshire	52.20°N 01.54°W	SP3156
Littlemoss	Tameside	53.48°N 02.13°W	SJ9199
Little Mountain	Flintshire	53.15°N 03.06°W	SJ2963
Little Musgrave	Cumbria	54.51°N 02.38°W	NY7513

=== Little N ===
Location	Locality	Coordinates (links to map & photo sources)	OS grid reference
Little Ness	Shropshire	52.76°N 02.89°W	SJ4019
Little Neston	Cheshire	53.27°N 03.06°W	SJ2976
Little Newcastle	Pembrokeshire	51.91°N 04.95°W	SM9728
Little Newsham	Durham	54.54°N 01.81°W	NZ1217
Little Norlington	East Sussex	50.90°N 00.06°E	TQ4514
Little Norton	Somerset	50.93°N 02.75°W	ST4715

=== Little O ===
Location	Locality	Coordinates (links to map & photo sources)	OS grid reference
Little Oakley	Essex	51.91°N 01.22°E	TM2229
Little Oakley	Northamptonshire	52.45°N 00.69°W	SP8985
Little Odell	Bedfordshire	52.20°N 00.59°W	SP9657
Little Offley	Hertfordshire	51.93°N 00.35°W	TL1328
Little Onn	Staffordshire	52.74°N 02.25°W	SJ8316
Little Ormside	Cumbria	54.53°N 02.46°W	NY7016
Little Orton	Cumbria	54.88°N 03.01°W	NY3555
Little Orton	Leicestershire	52.64°N 01.54°W	SK3105
Little Ouse	Cambridgeshire	52.47°N 00.38°E	TL6289
Little Ouseburn	North Yorkshire	54.03°N 01.32°W	SE4460
Littleover	City of Derby	52.89°N 01.52°W	SK3233
Little Overton	Wrexham	52.96°N 02.93°W	SJ3741
Little Oxney Green	Essex	51.71°N 00.40°E	TL6605

=== Little P ===
Location	Locality	Coordinates (links to map & photo sources)	OS grid reference
Little Packington	Warwickshire	52.45°N 01.69°W	SP2184
Little Parndon	Essex	51.77°N 00.07°E	TL4310
Little Paxton	Cambridgeshire	52.24°N 00.27°W	TL1862
Little Petherick	Cornwall	50.51°N 04.94°W	SW9172
Little Plumpton	Lancashire	53.78°N 02.95°W	SD3732
Little Plumstead	Norfolk	52.65°N 01.41°E	TG3112
Little Ponton	Lincolnshire	52.87°N 00.63°W	SK9232
Littleport	Cambridgeshire	52.45°N 00.29°E	TL5686
Little Posbrook	Hampshire	50.83°N 01.24°W	SU5304
Little Poulton	Lancashire	53.84°N 02.98°W	SD3539
Little Preston	Kent	51.29°N 00.48°E	TQ7358
Little Preston	City of Leeds	53.76°N 01.42°W	SE3830

=== Little R ===
Location	Locality	Coordinates (links to map & photo sources)	OS grid reference
Littler	Cheshire	53.19°N 02.55°W	SJ6366
Little Raveley	Cambridgeshire	52.39°N 00.16°W	TL2579
Little Reedness	East Riding of Yorkshire	53.68°N 00.78°W	SE8022
Little Reynoldston	Swansea	51.57°N 04.19°W	SS4889
Little Ribston	North Yorkshire	53.97°N 01.42°W	SE3853
Little Rissington	Gloucestershire	51.86°N 01.72°W	SP1919
Little Roe	Shetland Islands	60.49°N 01.27°W	HU400795
Little Rogart	Highland	57.99°N 04.16°W	NC7203
Little Rollright	Oxfordshire	51.96°N 01.57°W	SP2930
Little Ryburgh	Norfolk	52.81°N 00.90°E	TF9628
Little Ryton	Shropshire	52.62°N 02.76°W	SJ4803

=== Little S ===
Location	Locality	Coordinates (links to map & photo sources)	OS grid reference
Little Salisbury	Wiltshire	51.33°N 01.74°W	SU1860
Little Salkeld	Cumbria	54.71°N 02.68°W	NY5636
Little Sampford	Essex	51.97°N 00.40°E	TL6533
Little Sandhurst	Berkshire	51.35°N 00.80°W	SU8362
Little Saredon	Staffordshire	52.66°N 02.09°W	SJ9407
Little Saxham	Suffolk	52.23°N 00.62°E	TL7963
Little Scotland	Wigan	53.58°N 02.60°W	SD6010
Little Shelford	Cambridgeshire	52.13°N 00.11°E	TL4551
Little Shoddesden	Hampshire	51.23°N 01.60°W	SU2848
Little Shurdington	Gloucestershire	51.85°N 02.13°W	SO9117
Little Silver (Marwood)	Devon	51.14°N 04.08°W	SS5440
Little Silver (Cadeleigh)	Devon	50.87°N 03.55°W	SS9109
Little Singleton	Lancashire	53.84°N 02.95°W	SD3739
Little Skipwith	North Yorkshire	53.83°N 01.01°W	SE6538
Little Smeaton (Hambleton)	North Yorkshire	54.42°N 01.47°W	NZ3403
Little Smeaton (Selby)	North Yorkshire	53.64°N 01.21°W	SE5216
Little Snoring	Norfolk	52.85°N 00.89°E	TF9532
Little Sodbury	South Gloucestershire	51.54°N 02.36°W	ST7583
Little Sodbury End	South Gloucestershire	51.54°N 02.37°W	ST7483
Little Somborne	Hampshire	51.08°N 01.45°W	SU3832
Little Somerford	Wiltshire	51.55°N 02.05°W	ST9684
Little Soudley	Shropshire	52.84°N 02.43°W	SJ7128
Little Stainforth	North Yorkshire	54.09°N 02.29°W	SD8167
Little Stainton	Darlington	54.57°N 01.47°W	NZ3420
Little Stanmore	Harrow	51.59°N 00.29°W	TQ1890
Little Stanney	Cheshire	53.26°N 02.88°W	SJ4174
Little Staughton	Bedfordshire	52.24°N 00.39°W	TL1062
Littlestead Green	Berkshire	51.47°N 00.95°W	SU7376
Little Steeping	Lincolnshire	53.13°N 00.13°E	TF4362
Littlester	Shetland Islands	60.50°N 01.09°W	HU5080
Little Stoke	South Gloucestershire	51.52°N 02.56°W	ST6181
Little Stoke	Staffordshire	52.88°N 02.13°W	SJ9132
Littlestone-on-Sea	Kent	50.97°N 00.94°E	TR0724
Little Stonham	Suffolk	52.18°N 01.08°E	TM1159
Little Stretton	Leicestershire	52.59°N 01.02°W	SK6600
Little Stretton	Shropshire	52.51°N 02.82°W	SO4491
Little Strickland	Cumbria	54.56°N 02.68°W	NY5619
Little Studley	North Yorkshire	54.14°N 01.52°W	SE3172
Little Stukeley	Cambridgeshire	52.36°N 00.23°W	TL2075
Little Sugnall	Staffordshire	52.87°N 02.29°W	SJ8031
Little Sutton	Cheshire	53.28°N 02.94°W	SJ3777
Little Sutton	Lincolnshire	52.77°N 00.14°E	TF4522
Little Sutton	Shropshire	52.43°N 02.72°W	SO5182
Little Swinburne	Northumberland	55.08°N 02.09°W	NY9477

=== Little T ===
Location	Locality	Coordinates (links to map & photo sources)	OS grid reference
Little Tarrington	Herefordshire	52.06°N 02.55°W	SO6241
Little Tew	Oxfordshire	51.94°N 01.44°W	SP3828
Little Tey	Essex	51.87°N 00.74°E	TL8923
Little Thetford	Cambridgeshire	52.36°N 00.24°E	TL5376
Little Thornage	Norfolk	52.90°N 01.04°E	TG0538
Little Thornton	Lancashire	53.86°N 02.98°W	SD3541
Little Thorpe	Durham	54.77°N 01.34°W	NZ4242
Little Thorpe	Kirklees	53.69°N 01.72°W	SE1822
Littlethorpe	Leicestershire	52.55°N 01.20°W	SP5496
Littlethorpe	North Yorkshire	54.11°N 01.51°W	SE3269
Little Thurlow	Suffolk	52.13°N 00.43°E	TL6751
Little Thurlow Green	Suffolk	52.13°N 00.45°E	TL6851
Little Thurrock	Essex	51.48°N 00.33°E	TQ6279
Littleton	Bath and North East Somerset	51.36°N 02.64°W	ST5563
Littleton	Cheshire	53.18°N 02.83°W	SJ4466
Littleton	Dorset	50.83°N 02.15°W	ST8904
Littleton	Hampshire	51.08°N 01.35°W	SU4532
Littleton	Somerset	51.06°N 02.72°W	ST4930
Littleton (Guildford)	Surrey	51.21°N 00.59°W	SU9847
Littleton (Spelthorne)	Surrey	51.40°N 00.46°W	TQ0768
Littleton	Wiltshire	51.33°N 02.13°W	ST9160
Littleton Common	Surrey	51.41°N 00.44°W	TQ0870
Littleton Drew	Wiltshire	51.51°N 02.24°W	ST8380
Littleton Panell	Wiltshire	51.28°N 02.01°W	ST9954
Littleton-upon-Severn	South Gloucestershire	51.60°N 02.59°W	ST5990
Little Torboll	Highland	57.95°N 04.11°W	NH7598
Little Torrington	Devon	50.92°N 04.15°W	SS4916
Little Totham	Essex	51.76°N 00.72°E	TL8811
Little Town	Cheshire	53.44°N 02.54°W	SJ6494
Little Town	Cumbria	54.56°N 03.19°W	NY2319
Little Town	Highland	57.87°N 04.02°W	NH8089
Little Town	Lancashire	53.81°N 02.53°W	SD6535
Littletown	Devon	50.78°N 03.19°W	SY1699
Littletown	Durham	54.78°N 01.47°W	NZ3443
Littletown	Isle of Wight	50.70°N 01.25°W	SZ5390
Littletown	Kirklees	53.71°N 01.69°W	SE2024
Little Tring	Hertfordshire	51.79°N 00.68°W	SP9112
Little Twycross	Leicestershire	52.64°N 01.51°W	SK3305

=== Little U – Little Z ===
Location	Locality	Coordinates (links to map & photo sources)	OS grid reference
Little Urswick	Cumbria	54.14°N 03.13°W	SD2673
Little Vantage	West Lothian	55.85°N 03.43°W	NT1063
Little Wakering	Essex	51.55°N 00.78°E	TQ9388
Little Walden	Essex	52.04°N 00.24°E	TL5441
Little Waldingfield	Suffolk	52.07°N 00.80°E	TL9245
Little Walsingham	Norfolk	52.88°N 00.86°E	TF9336
Little Waltham	Essex	51.78°N 00.46°E	TL7012
Little Walton	Warwickshire	52.44°N 01.28°W	SP4983
Little Warley	Essex	51.58°N 00.30°E	TQ6090
Little Warton	Warwickshire	52.62°N 01.58°W	SK2803
Little Washbourne	Gloucestershire	51.99°N 02.01°W	SO9933
Little Weighton	East Riding of Yorkshire	53.78°N 00.51°W	SE9833
Little Welland	Herefordshire	52.04°N 02.29°W	SO8038
Little Welnetham	Suffolk	52.20°N 00.76°E	TL8960
Little Welton	Lincolnshire	53.36°N 00.04°W	TF3087
Little Wenham	Suffolk	52.01°N 01.02°E	TM0839
Little Wenlock	Shropshire	52.65°N 02.53°W	SJ6406
Little Weston	Somerset	51.02°N 02.54°W	ST6225
Little Whitehouse	Isle of Wight	50.71°N 01.36°W	SZ4591
Little Whittingham Green	Suffolk	52.33°N 01.34°E	TM2876
Littlewick Green	Berkshire	51.51°N 00.80°W	SU8380
Little Wigborough	Essex	51.79°N 00.85°E	TL9715
Little Wilbraham	Cambridgeshire	52.19°N 00.25°E	TL5458
Littlewindsor	Dorset	50.83°N 02.79°W	ST4404
Little Wisbeach	Lincolnshire	52.86°N 00.33°W	TF1231
Little Witcombe	Gloucestershire	51.83°N 02.13°W	SO9115
Little Witley	Worcestershire	52.26°N 02.32°W	SO7863
Little Wittenham	Oxfordshire	51.63°N 01.19°W	SU5693
Little Wolford	Warwickshire	52.01°N 01.62°W	SP2635
Littlewood	Staffordshire	52.66°N 02.03°W	SJ9807
Little Wood Corner	Buckinghamshire	51.70°N 00.68°W	SP9101
Little Woodcote	Sutton	51.33°N 00.16°W	TQ2861
Littlewood Green	Warwickshire	52.25°N 01.89°W	SP0762
Little Woolgarston	Dorset	50.62°N 02.04°W	SY9781
Littleworth	Bedfordshire	52.08°N 00.43°W	TL0744
Littleworth	Doncaster	53.47°N 01.06°W	SK6298
Littleworth (Minchinhampton)	Gloucestershire	51.70°N 02.21°W	SO8501
Littleworth (Chipping Campden)	Gloucestershire	52.04°N 01.79°W	SP1439
Littleworth (South Oxfordshire)	Oxfordshire	51.74°N 01.16°W	SP5805
Littleworth (Vale of White Horse)	Oxfordshire	51.67°N 01.55°W	SU3197
Littleworth (Wallingford)	Oxfordshire	51.61°N 01.12°W	SU6191
Littleworth (Cannock)	Staffordshire	52.70°N 01.98°W	SK0112
Littleworth (Stafford)	Staffordshire	52.80°N 02.10°W	SJ9323
Littleworth (Woodseaves)	Staffordshire	52.82°N 02.30°W	SJ7925
Littleworth	Warwickshire	52.26°N 01.66°W	SP2363
Littleworth	West Sussex	50.96°N 00.30°W	TQ1920
Littleworth	Wiltshire	51.34°N 01.74°W	SU1861
Littleworth (Feckenham)	Worcestershire	52.25°N 02.01°W	SO9962
Littleworth (Norton Juxta Kempsey)	Worcestershire	52.13°N 02.17°W	SO8849
Littleworth Common	Buckinghamshire	51.56°N 00.65°W	SU9386
Little Worthen	Shropshire	52.63°N 02.99°W	SJ3305
Littleworth End	Birmingham	52.57°N 01.78°W	SP1597
Little Wratting	Suffolk	52.09°N 00.45°E	TL6847
Little Wymington	Bedfordshire	52.27°N 00.60°W	SP9565
Little Wymondley	Hertfordshire	51.92°N 00.24°W	TL2127
Little Wyrley	Staffordshire	52.64°N 01.98°W	SK0105
Little Wytheford	Shropshire	52.76°N 02.65°W	SJ5619
Little Yeldham	Essex	52.02°N 00.57°E	TL7739
Littley Green	Essex	51.82°N 00.45°E	TL6917

=== Litto ===
Location	Locality	Coordinates (links to map & photo sources)	OS grid reference
Litton	Derbyshire	53.27°N 01.76°W	SK1675
Litton	North Yorkshire	54.16°N 02.15°W	SD9074
Litton	Somerset	51.28°N 02.58°W	ST5954
Litton Cheney	Dorset	50.70°N 02.63°W	SY5590
Litton Mill	Derbyshire	53.24°N 01.77°W	SK1572

== Liu–Liz ==
Location	Locality	Coordinates (links to map & photo sources)	OS grid reference
Liurbost / Leurbost	Western Isles	58.13°N 06.47°W	NB3725
Livermead	Devon	50.44°N 03.55°W	SX9062
Liverpool	City of Liverpool	53.41°N 02.94°W	SJ3791
Liversedge	Kirklees	53.70°N 01.69°W	SE2023
Liverton	Devon	50.56°N 03.69°W	SX8075
Liverton	Redcar and Cleveland	54.52°N 00.90°W	NZ7115
Liverton Mines	Redcar and Cleveland	54.54°N 00.90°W	NZ7117
Liverton Street	Kent	51.21°N 00.67°E	TQ8750
Livesey Street	Kent	51.26°N 00.43°E	TQ7054
Livingshayes	Devon	50.81°N 03.47°W	SS9603
Livingston	West Lothian	55.89°N 03.50°W	NT0668
Livingston Village	West Lothian	55.87°N 03.55°W	NT0366
Lixwm	Flintshire	53.22°N 03.25°W	SJ1671
Lizard	Cornwall	49.96°N 05.20°W	SW7012
Lizard Point	Cornwall	49.96°N 05.21°W	SW696117
