= Littleworth =

Littleworth may refer to several places in England:

- Littleworth, Aylesbury Vale, Buckinghamshire
- Littleworth, South Bucks, Buckinghamshire
- Littleworth, Minchinhampton, Gloucestershire, a location
- Littleworth, Chipping Campden, Gloucestershire, a location
- Littleworth, South Oxfordshire, Oxfordshire
- Littleworth, Vale of White Horse, Oxfordshire
- Littleworth, Cannock, Staffordshire
- Littleworth, Stafford, Staffordshire
- Littleworth, Woodseaves, Staffordshire
- Littleworth, Doncaster, South Yorkshire
- Littleworth, Warwickshire, a location in Norton Lindsey parish
- Littleworth, West Sussex
- Littleworth, Wiltshire
- Littleworth, Feckenham, Worcestershire, a location
- Littleworth, Worcestershire, near Worcester
- Littleworth railway station (closed), Deeping St Nicholas, Lincolnshire
