= Little London =

Little London may refer to the following places:

== United Kingdom ==
- Little London, Brill, Buckinghamshire
- Little London, Oakley, Bucks
- Little London, East Sussex
- Little London, Gloucestershire
- Little London, Andover, Hampshire
- Little London, Tadley, Hampshire
- Little London, Spalding, Lincolnshire
- Little London, Stallingborough, Lincolnshire
- Little London, Corpusty, Norfolk
- Little London, Northwold, Norfolk
- Little London, Powys, Wales: a hamlet in Llandinam community
- Little London, Shropshire
- Little London, Somerset, a part of Oakhill
- Little London, Suffolk
- Little London, Albury, Surrey
- Little London, Wendover, Buckinghamshire
- Little London, Leeds, West Yorkshire
- Little London, West Yorkshire, split between Rawdon, Leeds, and Idle and Thackley, Bradford

== Other countries ==
- Little London, Jamaica
- Londrina ("Londoner" or "Little London"), Paraná, Brazil, named for British entrepreneurs who initiated the settlement
- Mali London ("Little London"), a settlement in Pančevo, Serbia
- Londynek (pl. Little London), district in Bydgoszcz, Poland around Pomorska Street, Bydgoszcz

== As a nickname ==
- Gothenburg, Sweden
- Colorado Springs, Colorado
- Balaklava, Sevastopol, Crimea
- Hingham, Norfolk, England
- Quetta, Pakistan
