= Little Common =

Little Common may refer to the following places in England:

- Little Common, East Sussex, an area of Bexhill-on-Sea, East Sussex
  - Little Common F.C., a football club
- Little Common, Lincolnshire, a location
- Little Common, Shropshire, a small hamlet in Shropshire
- Little Common, West Sussex, a location
