= List of United Kingdom locations: V =

The United Kingdom

This is part of the list of United Kingdom locations: a gazetteer of place names in the United Kingdom showing each place's locality and geographical coordinates.

== Va ==
Location	Locality	Coordinates (links to map & photo sources)	OS grid reference
Vacasay Island	Western Isles	58.22°N 06.79°W	NB187362
Vaccasay	Western Isles	57.65°N 07.07°W	NF977743
Vachelich	Pembrokeshire	51.87°N 05.24°W	SM7725
Vacsay	Western Isles	58.22°N 06.91°W	NB115370
Vagg	Somerset	50.95°N 02.68°W	ST5218
Vaila	Shetland Islands	60.19°N 01.59°W	HU228461
Valasay	Western Isles	58.22°N 06.87°W	NB1436
Vale	Calderdale	53.73°N 02.13°W	SD9126
Vale Down	Devon	50.65°N 04.09°W	SX5286
Vale of Health	Camden	51.55°N 00.18°W	TQ2686
Valeswood	Shropshire	52.77°N 02.90°W	SJ3920
Vallay	Western Isles	57.66°N 07.41°W	NF775763
Valley	Isle of Anglesey	53.28°N 04.56°W	SH2979
Valley Truckle	Cornwall	50.60°N 04.70°W	SX0982
Valtos	Highland	57.58°N 06.16°W	NG5163
Van	Powys	52.47°N 03.54°W	SN9587
Van	Caerphilly	51.56°N 03.21°W	ST1686
Vange	Essex	51.55°N 00.47°E	TQ7287
Vanlop	Shetland Islands	59.94°N 01.33°W	HU3718
Varchoel	Powys	52.70°N 03.14°W	SJ2312
Varfell	Cornwall	50.13°N 05.50°W	SW5032
Varteg	Torfaen	51.74°N 03.07°W	SO2606
Vassa	Shetland Islands	60.25°N 01.17°W	HU4653
Vastern	Wiltshire	51.52°N 01.92°W	SU0581
Vatersay	Western Isles	56.91°N 07.54°W	NL6394
Vatsetter	Shetland Islands	60.58°N 01.03°W	HU5389
Vatten	Highland	57.39°N 06.52°W	NG2843
Vaul	Argyll and Bute	56.53°N 06.81°W	NM0448
Vauxhall	Birmingham	52.48°N 01.88°W	SP0887
Vauxhall	Lambeth	51.48°N 00.12°W	TQ3078
Vauxhall	Liverpool	53.41°N 02.99°W	SJ3491
Vaynol Hall	Gwynedd	53.19°N 04.20°W	SH5369
Vaynor	Merthyr Tydfil	51.78°N 03.39°W	SO0410

== Ve ==
Location	Locality	Coordinates (links to map & photo sources)	OS grid reference
Veensgarth	Shetland Islands	60.17°N 01.24°W	HU4244
Velator	Devon	51.09°N 04.17°W	SS4835
Veldo	Herefordshire	52.08°N 02.65°W	SO5543
Velindre	Powys	52.01°N 03.19°W	SO1836
Vellanoweth	Cornwall	50.14°N 05.50°W	SW5033
Vellow	Somerset	51.13°N 03.30°W	ST0938
Velly	Devon	50.99°N 04.43°W	SS2924
Vementry	Shetland Islands	60.31°N 01.45°W	HU3059
Veness	Orkney Islands	59.14°N 02.75°W	HY5729
Venn	Devon	50.29°N 03.82°W	SX7046
Venngreen	Devon	50.87°N 04.31°W	SS3711
Vennington	Shropshire	52.67°N 02.99°W	SJ3309
Venn Ottery	Devon	50.71°N 03.31°W	SY0791
Venn's Green	Herefordshire	52.12°N 02.68°W	SO5348
Venny Tedburn	Devon	50.76°N 03.67°W	SX8297
Venterdon	Cornwall	50.54°N 04.33°W	SX3574
Vention	Devon	51.13°N 04.21°W	SS4540
Ventnor	Isle of Wight	50.59°N 01.21°W	SZ5677
Venton	Devon	50.38°N 03.99°W	SX5856
Ventongimps	Cornwall	50.31°N 05.12°W	SW7851
Ventonleague	Cornwall	50.19°N 05.40°W	SW5738
Venus Hill	Hertfordshire	51.69°N 00.53°W	TL0101
Veraby	Devon	51.02°N 03.75°W	SS7726
Vernham Bank	Hampshire	51.30°N 01.52°W	SU3356
Vernham Dean	Hampshire	51.30°N 01.51°W	SU3456
Vernham Row	Hampshire	51.31°N 01.52°W	SU3357
Vernham Street	Hampshire	51.31°N 01.51°W	SU3457
Vernolds Common	Shropshire	52.41°N 02.78°W	SO4780
Verran Island	Western Isles	57.28°N 07.43°W	NF726348
Verwood	Dorset	50.88°N 01.88°W	SU084090
Veryan	Cornwall	50.21°N 04.93°W	SW9139
Veryan Green	Cornwall	50.22°N 04.91°W	SW9240

== Vi ==
Location	Locality	Coordinates (links to map & photo sources)	OS grid reference
Vicarage	Devon	50.68°N 03.13°W	SY2088
Vicarscross	Cheshire	53.18°N 02.83°W	SJ4466
Vickerstown	Cumbria	54.10°N 03.25°W	SD1868
Victoria	Cornwall	50.41°N 04.84°W	SW9861
Victoria	Kirklees	53.54°N 01.74°W	SE1705
Victoria North	Greater Manchester		
Victoria Park	Buckinghamshire	51.80°N 00.79°W	SP8313
Victory Gardens	Renfrewshire	55.86°N 04.39°W	NS5066
Vidlin	Shetland Islands	60.36°N 01.14°W	HU4765
Viewpark	North Lanarkshire	55.82°N 04.06°W	NS7161
Vigo	Walsall	52.61°N 01.94°W	SK0402
Vigo Village	Kent	51.32°N 00.33°E	TQ6361
Vinegar Hill	Monmouthshire	51.57°N 02.82°W	ST4387
Vinehall Street	East Sussex	50.95°N 00.49°E	TQ7520
Vines Cross	East Sussex	50.93705°N 0.26747°E	TQ5917
Viney Hill	Gloucestershire	51.75°N 02.50°W	SO6506
Vinney Green	South Gloucestershire	51.49°N 02.49°W	ST6677
Virginia Water	Surrey	51.39°N 00.57°W	SU9967
Virginstow	Devon	50.70°N 04.31°W	SX3792
Virley	Essex	51.78°N 00.81°E	TL9413
Viscar	Cornwall	50.15°N 05.20°W	SW7133

== Vo ==
Location	Locality	Coordinates (links to map & photo sources)	OS grid reference
Vobster	Somerset	51.23°N 02.43°W	ST7049
Voe (Delting)	Shetland Islands	60.34°N 01.27°W	HU4062
Voe (Northmavine)	Shetland Islands	60.51°N 01.40°W	HU3381
Voesgarth	Shetland Islands	60.75°N 00.88°W	HP6108
Vogue	Cornwall	50.23°N 05.19°W	SW7242
Vole	Somerset	51.23°N 02.91°W	ST3649
Vorogay	Western Isles	57.55°N 07.38°W	NF783638
Vowchurch	Herefordshire	52.01°N 02.93°W	SO3636
Vowchurch Common	Herefordshire	52.02°N 02.91°W	SO3737
Voxmoor	Somerset	50.95°N 03.22°W	ST1418
Voy	Orkney Islands	59.00°N 03.30°W	HY2514

== Vr ==
Location	Locality	Coordinates (links to map & photo sources)	OS grid reference
Vron Gate	Shropshire	52.67°N 03.00°W	SJ3209

== Vu ==
Location	Locality	Coordinates (links to map & photo sources)	OS grid reference
Vuia Beag	Western Isles	58.19°N 06.89°W	NB123331
Vuia Mòr	Western Isles	58.20°N 06.88°W	NB130347
Vulcan Village	Cheshire	53.43°N 02.63°W	SJ5893
