= Littleborough =

Places named Littleborough in England are:

- Littleborough, Devon, a location
- Littleborough, Greater Manchester
- Littleborough, Nottinghamshire: south of Gainsborough
