= Little Town =

Little Town may refer to:

== Entertainment ==
- "Little Town" (song), a new arrangement of the carol "O Little Town of Bethlehem"

== United Kingdom ==
- Little Town, Cheshire, England, a location in the United Kingdom
- Little Town, Cumbria, England
- Little Town, Highland, Scotland, a location in the United Kingdom
- Little Town, Lancashire, England, a location in the United Kingdom

== United States ==
- Little Town (Littleton, Virginia), listed on the NRHP in Virginia

== See also ==
- Littletown (disambiguation)
