= Victory Garden =

A Victory garden is a private garden planted in the British Empire and United States during World War I and World War II

Victory Garden may also refer to:

== Gardens ==
- Victory Garden, Macau, a park
- Victory Gardens, New Jersey, United States
- Victory Gardens Theater, a Chicago theater
- Victory Gardens, Renfrewshire, a location in the UK

== Arts and entertainment ==
- Victory Garden (novel), a work of electronic literature by Stuart Moulthrop
- The Victory Garden (comics), a comic–book story starring Donald Duck
- The Victory Garden (TV program), an American show about gardening
- Victory Gardens, a 1991 album by John & Mary
- Victory Garden (album), a 2026 album by Young the Giant

== Other ==
- Victory Gardens, a borough in Morris County, New Jersey
- Victory garden (First Intifada), small-scale agricultural cooperatives set up by Palestinians during the First Intifada.
