= Littlecote =

Littlecote may refer to several places in England:

- Littlecote, Buckinghamshire, a hamlet
- Littlecote House, Wiltshire
- Littlecote Roman Villa, Wiltshire
