= Little Marsh =

Little Marsh may refer to three places in England:

- Little Marsh, Buckinghamshire, a hamlet in Marsh Gibbon parish
- Little Marsh, Norfolk, a hamlet in Field Dalling parish
- Little Marsh, Wiltshire, a hamlet in Semington parish
