= Burston, Buckinghamshire =

Hamlet in Buckinghamshire, England

Coordinates: 51.860°N 0.785°W

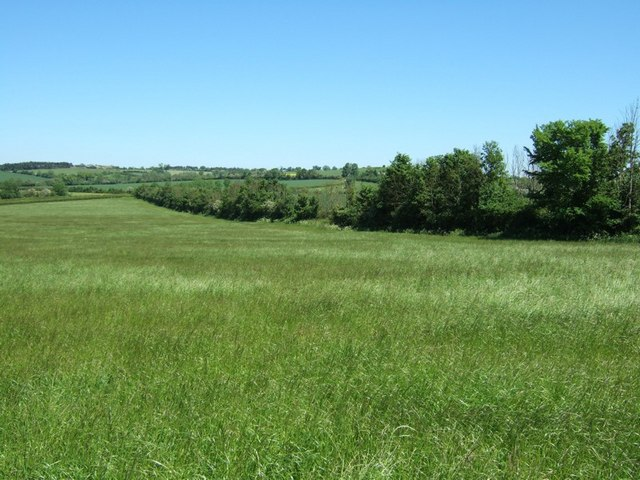
Fields in Burston Hill Farm

Burston is a small hamlet near Rowsham in Buckinghamshire about three miles (4.8 km) north of Aylesbury. It is in the civil parish of Aston Abbotts. Its name derives from the Old English personal name Briddel + þorn (“thornbush”).

There used to be a village of Burston, which was recorded separately to Aston Abbots in the Domesday Book of 1086. The village was deserted after its residents were evicted in 1488, to clear arable farmland for sheep grazing. The desertion was later investigated by Thomas Wolsey, who found that after evicting at least 60 people, the landlord raised rents from £13 1s 8d a year to £40.

Modern Burston consists of a few farms, including Burston Hill Farm, Lower Burston, and Burston Ridge Farm, but in the valley below earthworks of the old settlement remain and are a scheduled monument.

== See also ==
- Enclosure, the removal of common rights that people had to farmlands and parish commons.
- Fleet Marston and Littlecote, other villages near to Aylesbury that were deserted after enclosure.
