= Little Bromley =

Village in Essex, England

Coordinates: 51.91740°N 1.04493°E

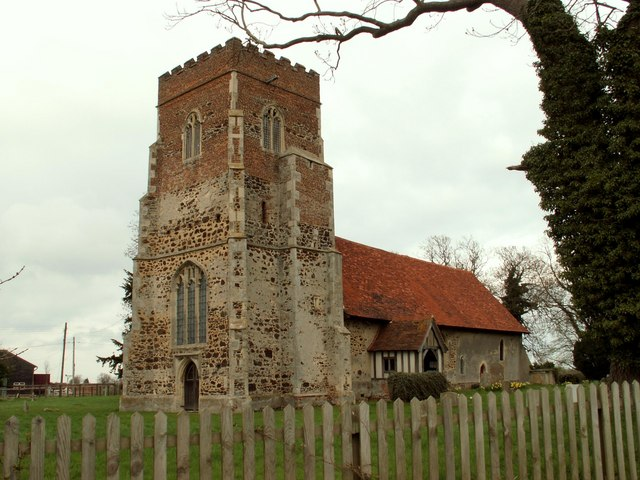
- St Mary the Virgin's Church, Little Bromley

- Location within Essex
- Population: 255 (Parish, 2021)
- OS grid reference: TM095287
- Civil parish: Little Bromley
- District: Tendring
- Shire county: Essex
- Region: East
- Country: England
- Sovereign state: United Kingdom
- Post town: Manningtree
- Postcode district: CO11
- Dialling code: 01206
- Police: Essex
- Fire: Essex
- Ambulance: East of England

Little Bromley is a village and civil parish in the Tendring district of Essex, England. The name "Bromley" is Old English for "broomy wood/clearing". The village lies 9 kilometres (6 mi) east northeast of Colchester and 3 kilometres (2 mi) south of Manningtree. It is surrounded by the parishes of Lawford, Ardleigh, Great Bromley, Little Bentley, and Mistley. Its area is about 7.5 square kilometres (1,853 acres). At the 2021 census the parish had a population of 255.

The Anglican Church of St Mary the Virgin, is no longer used for regular worship and is in the care of the Churches Conservation Trust. A Methodist chapel, built in 1863, closed in the late 1980s.

== Population ==
At the 2021 census the parish had a population of 255.

The population was reported to be 426 in the 1841 census,, 361 in the 1911 census,, 289 in the 2001 census, and 253 in the 2011 census.

== Nearby places ==
Ardleigh	Lawford	Manningtree
Colchester	Little Bromley	Mistley
Elmstead Market	Great Bromley	Little Bentley
