= Little Down =

Hamlet in Hampshire, England

Coordinates: 51.321°N 1.498°W

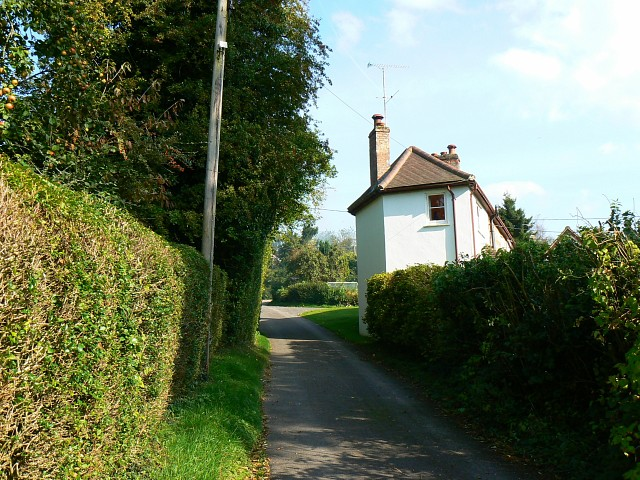

- Location within Hampshire
- OS grid reference: SU351581
- Civil parish: Vernham Dean
- District: Test Valley
- Shire county: Hampshire
- Region: South East
- Country: England
- Sovereign state: United Kingdom
- Post town: ANDOVER
- Postcode district: SP11
- Dialling code: 01264
- Police: Hampshire and Isle of Wight
- Fire: Hampshire and Isle of Wight
- Ambulance: South Central
- UK Parliament: North West Hampshire

Little Down (or Littledown) is a village in Hampshire, England, on the North Downs near the county boundaries with Berkshire and Wiltshire. It lies just north of Vernham Street village, in Vernham Dean civil parish.

Its nearest town is Andover, approximately 7.5 miles (12 km) south from the village.
