= Mali London =

Serbian settlement

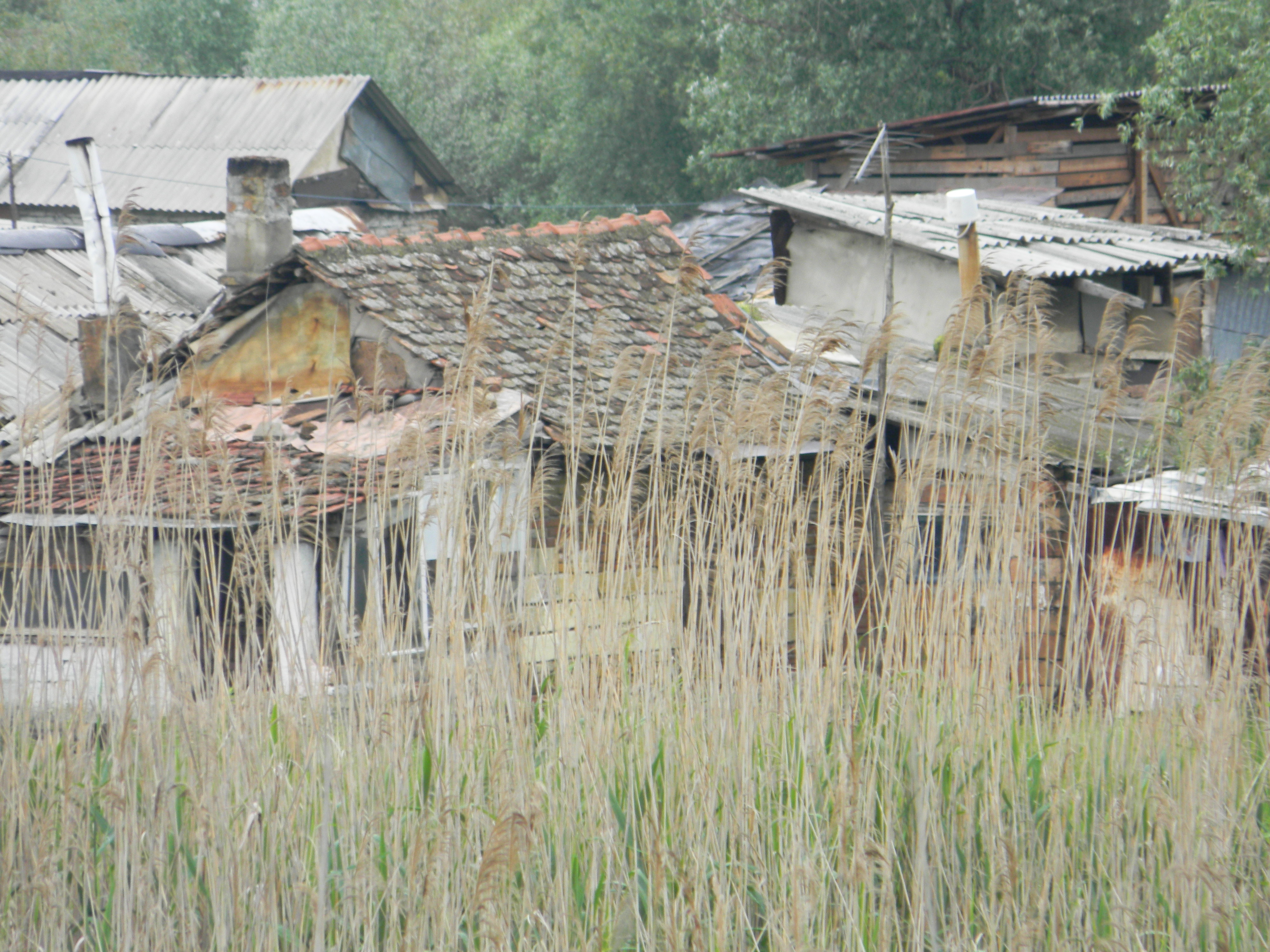
Housings of Mali London

Mali London (Serbian Cyrillic: Мали Лондон, English: Little London) is a suburban settlement in Pančevo, Serbia. Mali London is located on both sides of the road E70, nearby the industrial site of the city. It has about 70 housing units, inhabited by Romani people.

Many of the residents of Mali London make a living by recycling metal. Used cars are brought to the settlement and taken apart, to be resold as scrap or sheet metal. The settlement is without running water or electricity, and it presents a health risk for its inhabitants. In 2005, some people of Mali London have formed the association Mali Rit London Društvo Roma.

== See also ==
- Little London - A full list of places with this name
