= Littletown =

Littletown could be the following places:

- Littletown, Arizona, USA
- Littletown, County Durham, England
- Littletown, County Kildare, a townland in County Kildare, Ireland
- Littletown, County Westmeath, a townland in Kilkenny West civil parish, barony of Kilkenny West, County Westmeath, Ireland
- Littletown, County Wexford, a townland in Tomhaggard civil parish, barony of Bargy, County Wexford, Ireland
- Littletown, Isle of Wight, England
- Littletown, New Jersey, USA
- Littletown, West Yorkshire, England

== See also ==
- Little Town (disambiguation)
- Littleton (disambiguation)
