= Little Thurlow Green =

Hamlet in Suffolk, United Kingdom

Coordinates: 52.1349°N 0.4626°E

Little Thurlow Green is a hamlet in the West Suffolk district, in the county of Suffolk. Nearby settlements include the town of Haverhill and the villages of Little Thurlow and Great Thurlow. It is located near the B1061 road. Its post town is Haverhill.
