= Clare Castle =

Castle in Suffolk, England

- Clare, Suffolk, England
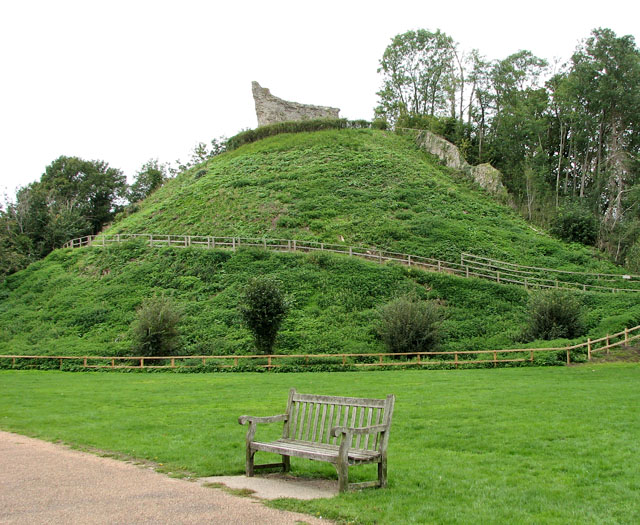
- Motte of Clare Castle

Site information
- Type: Motte and bailey
- Owner: Clare Town Council
- Open to the public: Yes
- Condition: Ruined; motte and outer bailey survive

Location
- Shown within Suffolk
- Location within Suffolk
- Coordinates: 52.0768°N 0.5829°E
- Grid reference: grid reference TL771452

Site history
- Materials: Flint and rubble

Clare Castle is a high-mounted ruinous medieval castle in the parish and former manor of Clare in Suffolk, England, anciently the caput of a feudal barony. It was built shortly after the Norman Conquest of England in 1066 by Richard Fitz Gilbert, having high motte and bailey and later improved in stone. In the 14th century it was the seat of Elizabeth de Clare, one of the wealthiest women in England, who maintained a substantial household there. The castle passed into the hands of the Crown and by 1600 was disused. The ruins are an unusually tall earthen motte surmounted by tall remnants of a wall and of the round tower, with large grassland or near-rubble gaps on several of their sides. It was damaged by an alternate line of the Great Eastern Railway in 1867, the rails of which have been removed.

The remains are a scheduled monument and a Grade II* listed building. They form the centrepiece of a public park.

== History ==
=== 11th–13th centuries ===
Soon after the Norman conquest of England, Richard Fitz Gilbert was granted a barony by William the Conqueror, with two blocks of land, first in Kent and later across Suffolk and Essex. Richard built two castles to defend his new lands, Tonbridge in Kent, followed by Clare Castle in Suffolk. The exact date of the construction is unknown, but the first documentary records of the castle appear by 1090. In the 11th century, Suffolk was one of the most prosperous parts of the country.

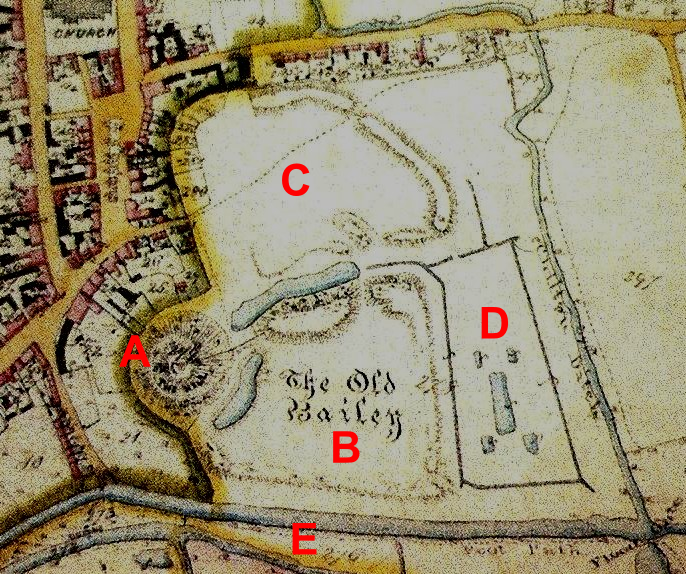
Tithe map of Clare Castle in 1846: A – Motte and keep; B – Inner bailey; C – Outer bailey; D – site of former water gardens; E – New Cut (Stour)

Clare Castle was built between the River Stour and the Chilton Stream and took the form of a motte and bailey design, with two baileys rather than the more common one. The motte is 850 feet (260 m) wide at the base and 100 feet (30 m) tall, with its flat summit 63 feet (19 m) across. The two baileys, stretching alongside from the motte along the north and east, were protected by deep ditches and steep palisades, with either a causeway or a drawbridge linking the inner to the outer bailey; the inner bailey was also sheltered by the curve of the Chilton.

The castle was built on the site of a former Anglo-Saxon manor house, probably reflective of the wider Norman effort to demonstrate that their authority had replaced those of the previous lords. Clare Castle was the caput of the feudal barony of Clare, and as historian Robert Liddiard describes, as well as having a defensive value it also "represented and reflected the rank and dignity of the lord". The castle was surrounded by three deer parks, including the Great Park at Hundon, established by 1090. Like many other major castles, Clare was provided with a nearby religious house when Richard de Clare, 6th Earl of Gloucester founded Clare Priory in 1249, close to the castle, which grew to contain 29 friars.

A new keep was built, probably in the 13th century. This took the form of a polygonal shell keep, with fourteen triangular buttresses supporting six feet (1.8 m) thick walls. The inner bailey was strengthened with new stone walls, 20 to 30 feet (6.1 to 9.1 m) tall on top of the earlier earth banks, the walls and keep being built of flint and rubble. The castle was manned during this period by a castle-guard system, in which lands were granted to local gentry for the feudal tenure of providing knights and soldiers to serve at the castle.

=== 14th century ===
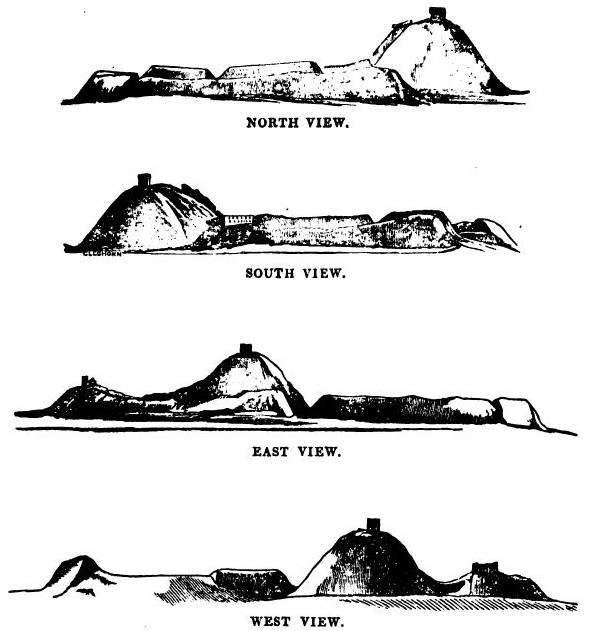
Mid-19th-century views of Clare Castle

By the early 14th century, before the outbreak of the Black Death, the town of Clare had a population of around 600. The de Clares continued to own estates across England, but in Suffolk their possessions were concentrated in estates situated around Clare Castle. The castle was passed down the de Clare line until Gilbert de Clare, 8th Earl of Gloucester died at the Battle of Bannockburn in 1314, when the estate passed to his sisters. Elizabeth de Clare, whose husband John de Burgh had died the previous year, acquired the castle and the combined estates made her one of the wealthiest women in England. Elizabeth used the castle as her main residence between 1322 and 1360.

The castle was well developed by this time, and was reached through three gates positioned across the wider estate, called Nethergate (memorialised by today's Nethergate Street), Redgate and Dernegate. The castle itself had four stone towers protecting the entrance to the inner bailey and the keep, called Auditorstower, Maidenstower, Constabletower and Oxfordtower. Elizabeth built a chamber for her own use at the castle between 1346 and 1347. A substantial water-garden, forming part of the moat to the east, existed at the castle during this period; it may have included a fountain and probably had a geometric form, possibly similar to the garden at nearby St Benet's Abbey in Norfolk. Vineyards and orchards surrounded the property. The castle's three parks continued in active use, and as part of the breeding programme, the deer were moved between them as they grew older.

The castle and estates supported a luxurious, wealthy lifestyle by their owners – Elizabeth had an income of approximately £3,500 a year, most of which was spent on supporting her household, centred on Clare. (Note: It is impossible to accurately compare 14th century and modern prices or incomes. For comparison, £3,500 represents several times the typical average annual income for an early 15th-century baron.) Over £1,750 was spent on food and drink, including luxuries such as swans, salmon and German wines. (Note: It is impossible to accurately compare 14th century and modern prices or incomes. For comparison, £1,750 represents over one and half times the typical average annual income for an early 15th-century baron.) Some goods could be bought locally, but others, such as furs, spices, cloth and wine, were imported for the castle through the international fairs held at Bury St Edmunds, Colchester, Ipswich, London, King's Lynn and the Stourbridge Fair. The staff at Clare Castle included falconers, tailors, chaplains and goldsmiths, supported as necessary by 30 knights and squires. The castle's bakers could produce up to 2,360 loaves of bread a day, and on average around 900 gallons (4,091 litres) of ale were brewed every five days. (Note: One of the reasons for the high quantities of bread produced was because it was common to pay wages in the form of bread during this period.)

=== 15th–21st centuries ===
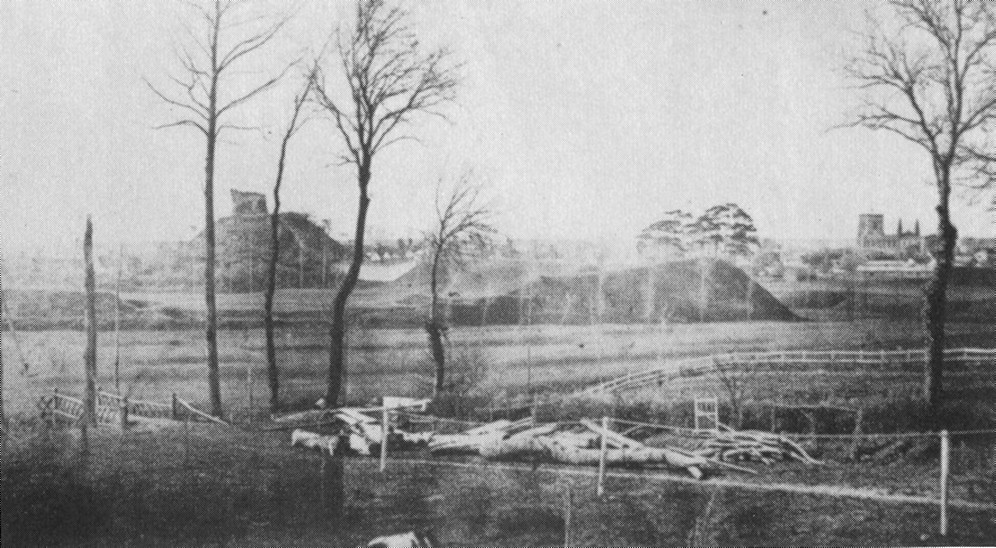
Photograph of Clare Castle from the south in 1860, shortly before the inner bailey was destroyed by the construction of the Great Eastern Railway

After Elizabeth de Clare's death, Clare Castle passed by marriage to the son of Edward III, Lionel of Antwerp, and again by marriage to the Mortimers of Wigmore. When Sir Edmund Mortimer acquired the castle in 1405, contemporaries reported it "in good repair and stocked". The subsequent years saw the Mortimers heavily involved in the Wars of the Roses; after Edmund's death in 1425, the castle passed to Richard of York and in turn, via his son Edward IV, to the Crown. Early in the reign of Edward IV, on 1 June 1461, the castle was part of a large estate gifted by the king to his mother, Cecily Neville, dowager Duchess of York, who did use the castle, but not as a main residence. Her half sister, Margaret Neville Scrope, resided in the castle until her death in 1463, and was buried at Clare Priory.

The castle deteriorated during this period. The masonry of the castle had probably been stripped for use as local building materials, as this part of England was traditionally very short of suitable stone. Edward VI gave the castle to Sir John Checke, until it reverted to Mary I. After Mary, the castle was acquired by Sir Gervase Elwes of Stoke by Clare, whose family retained it until the 19th century. At some point after 1720, the surviving east and south sides of the inner bailey walls were destroyed.

In 1867 the Cambridge and Colchester branch line of the Great Eastern Railway was built through the castle, cutting across and largely destroying the inner bailey in order to make room for a new station. (Note: A 15th-century gold pectoral cross was found during the building work, which was given to Queen Victoria.) The railway line was later closed in 1967 as part of the Beeching Axe.

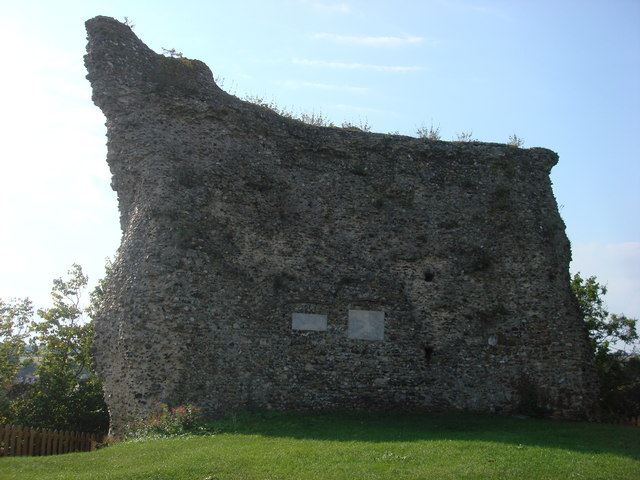
Surviving ruins

The castle now consists of a motte, on which a part of the keep still stands and the outer bailey earthworks; fragments of the inner bailey stone wall can also still be seen. The disused station, goods yard and the castle grounds have been developed into a landscaped country park, interlaced with water in the old moats, called Clare Castle Country Park, which is crossed by the Stour Valley Path. The park was opened in June 1972, after 15 acres (6.1 ha) were donated by Anthony de Fontblanque and 4.5 acres (1.8 ha) of railway land bought for £10,000.

In 2014, the keep and curtain wall were extensively consolidated with the assistance of English Heritage. In March 2015, the stewardship of the park transferred from Suffolk County Council to the Clare Town Council; a trust manages the park with the support of local volunteers. The castle is protected under UK law as a scheduled monument and a Grade II* listed building.

== See also ==
- Castles in Great Britain and Ireland
- List of castles in England

== Bibliography ==
- Bailey, Mark. (2010) Medieval Suffolk: An Economic and Social History, 1200–1500. Woodbridge, UK: Boydell Press. ISBN 978-1-84383-529-5.
- Dyer, Christopher. (2009) Making a Living in the Middle Ages: The People of Britain, 850 – 1520. London: Yale University Press. ISBN 978-0-300-10191-1.
- Emery, Anthony. (2006) Greater Medieval Houses of England and Wales, 1300–1500: Southern England. Cambridge: Cambridge University Press. ISBN 978-0-521-58132-5.
- Green, Judith A. (1997) The Aristocracy of Norman England. Cambridge: Cambridge University Press. ISBN 978-0-521-52465-0.
- Harper-Bill, Christopher. (ed) (2005) Medieval East Anglia. Woodbridge, UK: Boydell Press. ISBN 978-1-84383-151-8.
- Holmes, G. (1957) Estates of the Higher Nobility in Fourteenth Century England. Cambridge: Cambridge University Press. ISBN 978-0-521-11654-1.
- Hull, Lise E. (2009) Understanding the Castle Ruins of England and Wales: How to Interpret the History and Meaning of Masonry and Earthworks. Jefferson, US: MacFarland. ISBN 978-0-7864-3457-2.
- King, D. J. Cathcart. (1991) The Castle in England and Wales: An Interpretative History. London: Routledge. ISBN 0-415-00350-4.
- Liddiard, Robert. (2005a) "The Castle Landscape of Anglo-Norman East Anglia: A regional perspective," in Harper-Bill (ed) (2005).
- Liddiard, Robert. (2005b) Castles in Context: Power, Symbolism and Landscape, 1066 to 1500. Macclesfield, UK: Windgather Press. ISBN 0-9545575-2-2.
- MacKenzie, James Dixon. (1896/2009) The Castles of England: Their Story and Structure. General Books LLC. ISBN 978-1-150-51044-1.
- Mortimer, R. (1981) "The Beginnings of the Honour of Clare," Anglo-Norman Studies 3, pp. 119–141.
- Page, William. (ed) (1911) The Victoria History of Suffolk, Vol. 1. London: University of London.
- Pounds, Norman John Greville. (1994) The Medieval Castle in England and Wales: a social and political history. Cambridge: Cambridge University Press. ISBN 978-0-521-45828-3.
- Tymms, S. (1849) "Clare Castle," Proceedings of the Suffolk Institute of Archaeology and History 1:3, pp. 61–66.
- Underhill, Frances Ann. (1999) For Her Good Estate: The Life of Elizabeth de Burgh. New York: St Martin's Press. ISBN 978-0-312-21355-8.
- Underhill, Frances Ann. (2020) For Her Good Estate: The Life of Elizabeth de Burgh, Lady of Clare. London: Moonwort Press. ISBN 978-1-9163768-9-2 hardback from Clare College Cambridge; ISBN 978-1-9163768-0-9 paperback.
- Wall, J. C. (1911) "Ancient Earthworks," in Page (ed) (1911).
- Way, Albert. (1868) "Gold Pectoral Cross found at Clare Castle", The Archaeological Journal, 25, pp. 60–71.
