= St Mary the Virgin's Church, Little Bromley =

Coordinates: 51.9097°N 1.0397°E

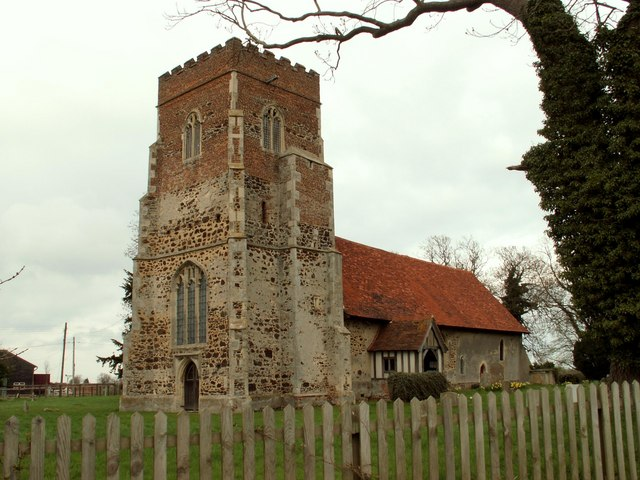
- St Mary the Virgin's Church, Little Bromley, from the southwest

- Location in Essex
- OS grid reference: TM 092 278
- Location: Little Bromley, Essex
- Country: England
- Denomination: Anglican
- Website: / The Churches Conservation Trust

History
- Dedication: Saint Mary the Virgin

Architecture
- Functional status: Redundant
- Heritage designation: Grade II*
- Designated: 17 November 1966
- Architectural type: Church
- Style: Norman, Gothic

Specifications
- Materials: Puddingstone with some red brick Red tiled roof

St Mary the Virgin's Church is a former Anglican church near the village of Little Bromley, Essex, England. It is recorded in the National Heritage List for England as a designated Grade II* listed building, and is under the care of The Churches Conservation Trust. The church stands to the south of the village, adjacent to Little Bromley Hall.

== History ==
The nave dates from the early 12th century. In the 14th century the chancel was rebuilt. The lower stages of the tower date from the early 15th century, and its upper stage was rebuilt in the 16th century. Also in the 16th century the south porch was added. Restorations were carried out in the 19th and 20th centuries.

== Architecture ==
=== Exterior ===
The church is constructed in puddingstone rubble with stone dressings. Parts of the exterior have been plastered. The upper stages of the tower are in red brick, and the roof is covered in plain red tiles. Its plan consists of a nave with a south porch, a chancel, and a west tower. Rising from the north wall is a chimney stack. The tower is in three stages on a plinth, with stepped angle buttresses. To the south is a stair turret. In the west wall is an arched 15th-century doorway, above which is a three-light window. The top stage contains a two-light bell opening in each face. The parapet is crenellated. The north wall of the nave contains, from the west, a 14th-century blocked doorway, a 12th-century round-headed window, and a three-light window with a segmental head. In the north wall of the chancel is a single lancet window. The east end of the chancel is supported by angle buttresses. The east window has three lights, and to its left is a memorial plaque. The south wall of the chancel contains two windows and a doorway. In the south wall of the nave are a 15th-century three-light window, with a 12th-century round headed window on each side, that to the east being blocked. The south porch is timber-framed on a plinth, with windows in each wall. The arched south doorway to the church dates from the 14th century. Above it are the royal arms of Hanover.

=== Interior ===
A barrel vaulted roof stretches over the nave and the chancel. The interior of the nave is in Norman style. In the nave is an oak pulpit and a charity board dated 1806. The font dates from the 15th or 16th century. It is octagonal with carvings on each side of the bowl; these represent the symbols of the four evangelists interspersed with Tudor roses. Under the bowl is a soffit carved with angels. The bowl is carried on a stem with four buttresses, standing on a chamfered base. In the chancel is a 14th-century piscina. The altar rails date from about 1700. The reredos is panelled and dates from about 1926. Also in the chancel is a memorial to the First World War. The stained glass in the north and south windows dates from the 20th century, and depicts Archbishop Laud and Charles I. At the west end of the church is a gallery with carvings of five shields of arms. The gallery contains the single-manual hand-pumped organ which is said to date from about 1820, made by W. G. Mack of Great Yarmouth. The distinctive blue pipes were stolen in 2015. There is a ring of four bells. Two of these date from the period of about 1392–1418 and are said to have been cast by Robert Burford of London. The other two date from about 1898; they were made by Bowell and Son of Ipswich to commemorate the Golden Jubilee of Queen Victoria.

== External features ==
The churchyard contains the war grave of a Royal Artillery soldier of World War II.

== See also ==
- List of churches preserved by the Churches Conservation Trust in the East of England
