= Little Heath, Cheshire East =

Village in Cheshire, England

Coordinates: 52.9965°N 2.49919°W

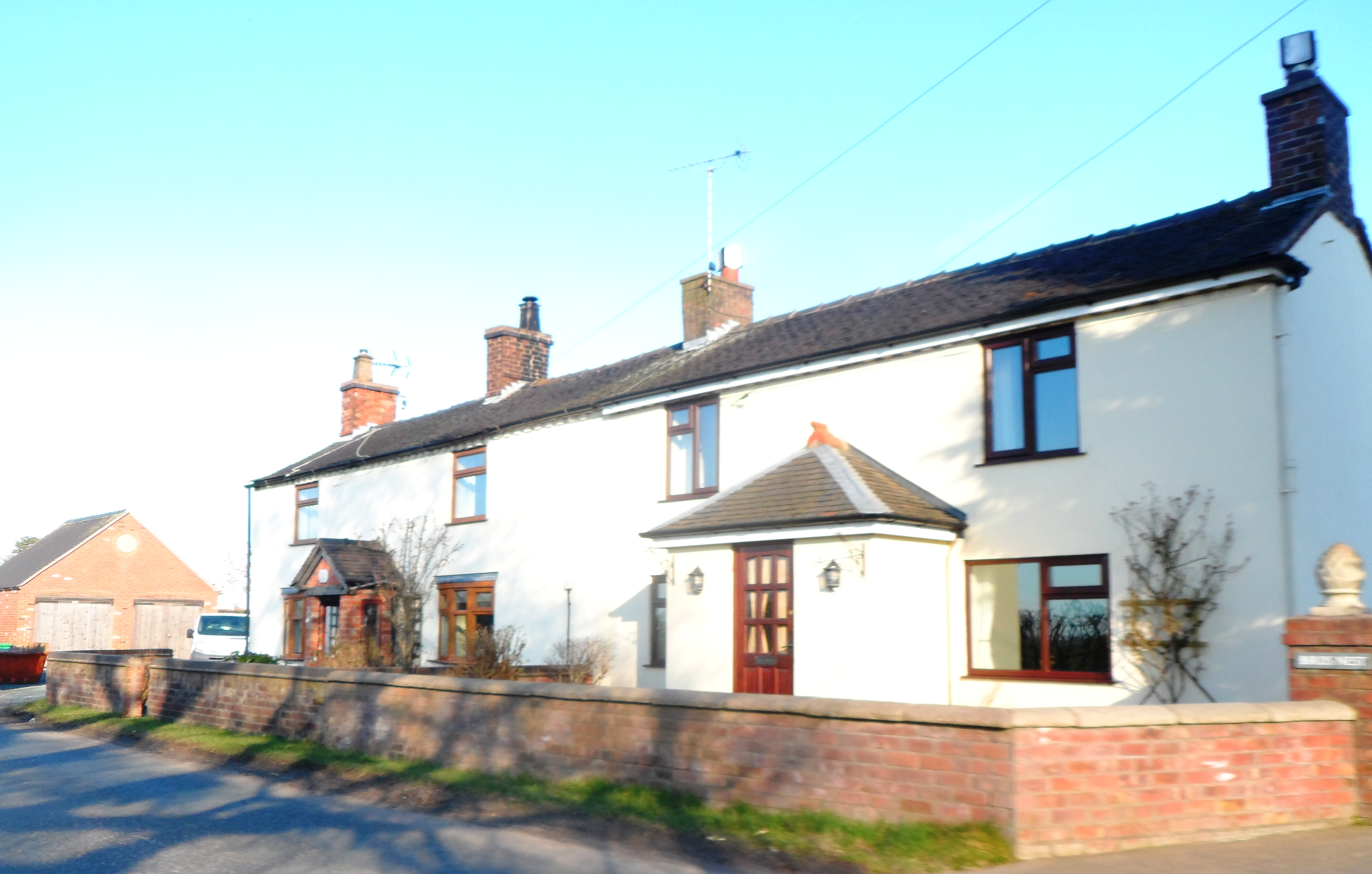
Houses at Little Heath

Little Heath is a village in the civil parish of Audlem, Cheshire, England. It is located to the north of Audlem, between Lonk Land and Audlem Road, the latter being part of today's A529 road.
