= Little Thurlow =

Village in Suffolk, England

Coordinates: 52.135°N 0.464°E

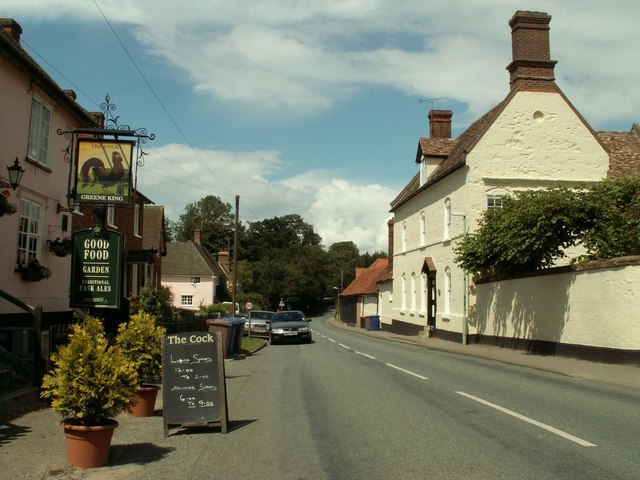
- Little Thurlow village

- Location within Suffolk
- Population: 249 (2011 Census)
- Civil parish: Little Thurlow
- District: West Suffolk
- Shire county: Suffolk
- Region: East
- Country: England
- Sovereign state: United Kingdom
- Post town: HAVERHILL
- Postcode district: CB9
- Dialling code: 01440
- Police: Suffolk
- Fire: Suffolk
- Ambulance: East of England
- UK Parliament: West Suffolk

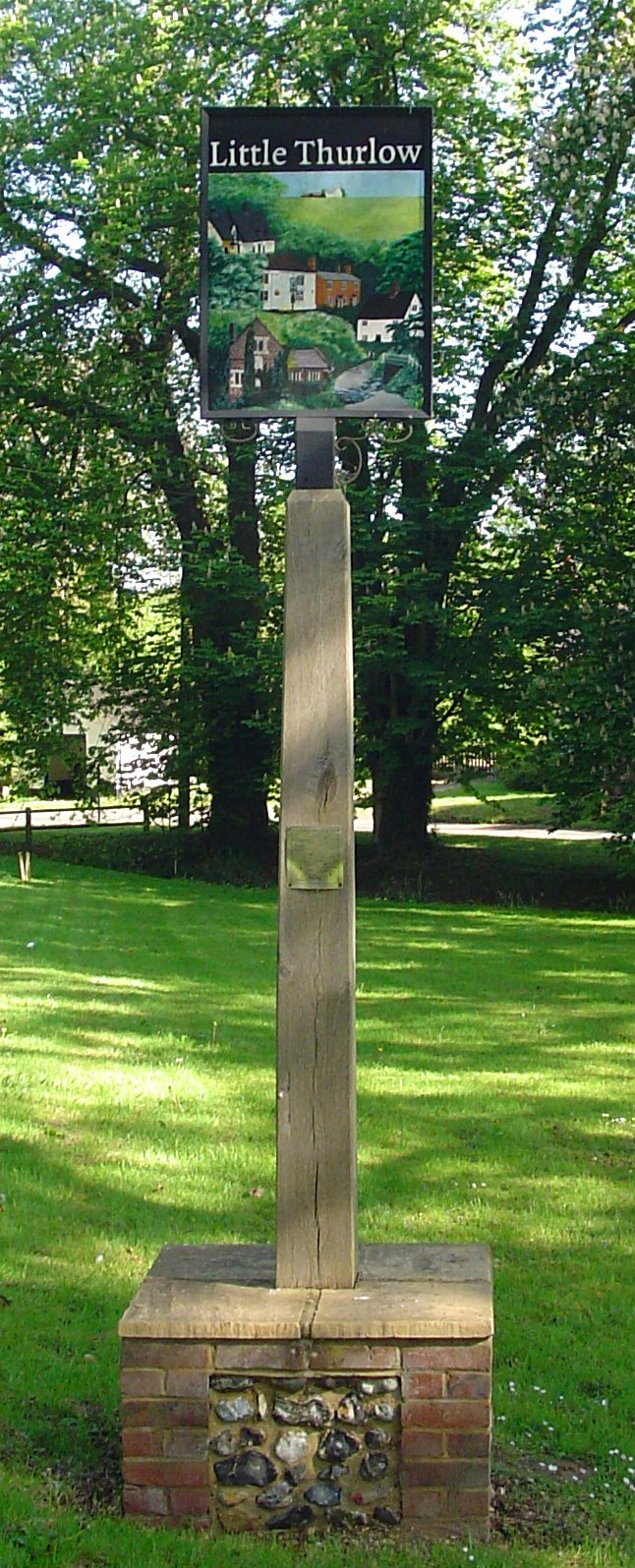
Village sign in Little Thurlow

Little Thurlow is a village and civil parish in the West Suffolk district of Suffolk in eastern England, located around a mile north-east of its sister village Great Thurlow, and four miles north of Haverhill.

Little Thurlow is roughly 15 miles (24 km) east of Cambridge and on the B1061. It has a few houses and is surrounded by farmland and rural areas.

The nearest school is located just down the road in Thurlow, and it is a CEVC primary school.

Little Thurlow is surrounded by wealthy estates and manors, with Clare Castle Country Park located 6 miles away, Kentwell Hall and Gardens 11 miles away, and Hedingham Castle also 11 miles away.

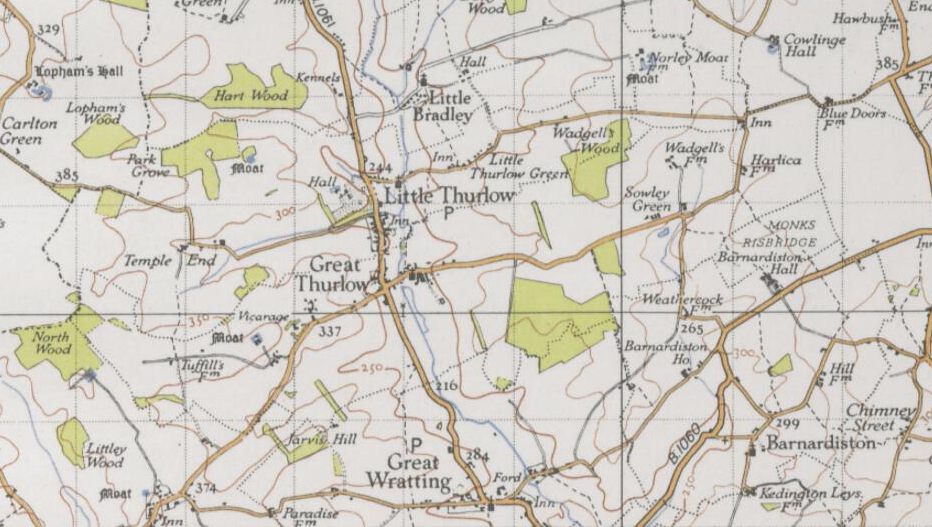
A view of the whereabouts of Little Thurlow in relation to nearby villages. This map shows the size of Little Thurlow.

== History ==
In the 1870s, Little Thurlow was described as:

a parish, with a village, in Risbridge district, Suffolk; 4½ miles N of Haverhill r. station. It has a post-office under Newmarket. Acres, 1,470. Real property, £2,630. Pop., 369. Houses, 95. T. Hall is the seat of Mrs. Soame. The living is a rectory in the diocese of Ely.

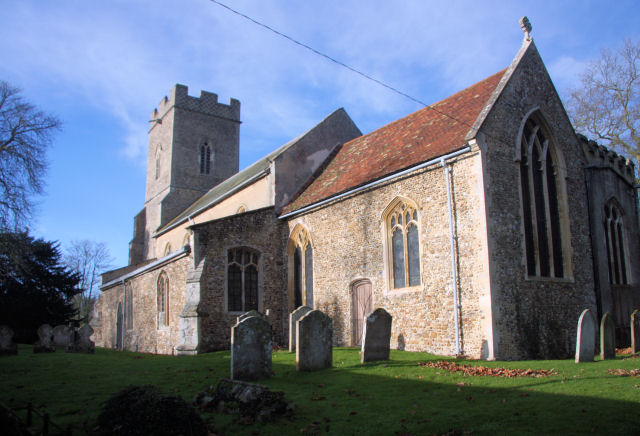
St Peter's Church in Little Thurlow

Little Thurlow has always had a history of agricultural employment, as well as specialist occupations such as blacksmiths and tailors in 1881. At this time, the majority of the people employed were men, apart from in domestic services. The men worked in a wide variety of jobs from general labour to agriculture, and the local government, as well as many more. Approximately 50 women were shown to have no specified occupation, however, this could mean that they were just not registered in their job or worked in their own profession

Little Thurlow and its nearby village Great Thurlow have been linked for many centuries through wealthy estate owners. One family that was very influential in the shaping of Little Thurlow as well as its nearby villages was that of the Soame family. Their first involvement within the area was in 1542 and their first manor house was prominent from then, up until 1809 when it burnt down. The family had interests in farming, coal mining and property. The Soame's property still remains as one was built and finished in 1849 to replace the burnt down one

The First and Second World Wars had an effect on the village of Little Thurlow. The First World War claimed the lives of ten villagers who were enlisted, with the church war memorial showing that another four from the village lost their lives in the Second World War. Furthermore, two planes were reported to have crashed in the field behind St Peter's Church.

== Demographics ==
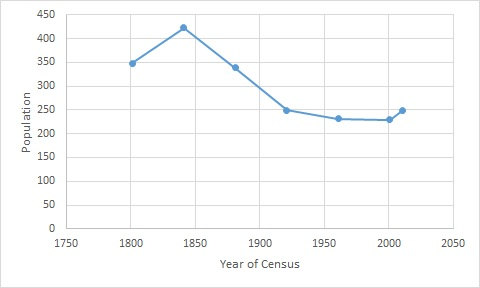
Total population changes of Little Thurlow Civil Parish from 1801 to 2011, as reported by the census of population from 1801 to 2011.

A graph showing the job occupations for male and females within LittleThurlow in 1881.

The village had a population of 249, according to the 2011 census. The population census for 1801 showed that there were 350 people living in Little Thurlow. Despite the general negative trend, the population rose to 425 in 1841, before it rapidly declined to 250 in the 1921 census.

Being mainly agricultural, Little Thurlow's job occupation demographics are likely to have stayed fairly similar since the last survey in 1881. This is because the parish has not grown in population since the first census, and therefore there are not many extra job opportunities. The majority of current day jobs are likely to range from employment on the farms and conservation within the environment as well as bar work, gardening, maintenance workers and mechanics.

Furthermore, nowadays many people in the parish are retired or have been made redundant due to a decreasing job market. This has led to a large pursuit in leisure activities, with a wide range from gardening and knitting to football, golf and shooting, as well as many more

== Transport and landmarks ==
Little Thurlow has no railway station, with the nearest located in Dullingham, approximately 6 miles north of the parish. It provides quick access to Cambridge and through to London. There are also bus links within the village with the 16A providing a link to Cambridge.

In terms of shopping habits, most people venture to the nearby town of Bury St Edmunds, but Haverhill, Cambridge, and Newmarket are also popular destinations.

The 14th-century church of St Peter is a grade II* listed building. A description from 1868 states that the church contains the monumental brass of a knight in armour, bearing the date 1500. The first recorded priest was assigned in 1279 and the fonts date back eight hundred years.

There were two windmills located within Little Thurlow, remembered in the form of the names of the houses Mill House and Mill View. The base of one of the windmills remains; however, there is no physical evidence of the second windmill that stood upon Almshouse Hill.
