= Little Posbrook =

Hamlet in Hampshire, England

Coordinates: 50°50′12″N 1°14′30″W

Little Posbrook is a hamlet in south Hampshire, England. At the 2011 census the population of the hamlet was included in the Titchfield ward of Fareham Borough Council.
