= Viscar =

Coordinates: 50.154°N 5.204°W

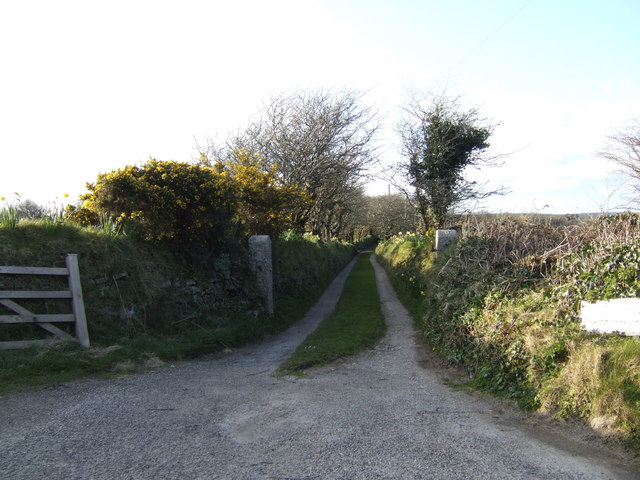
- A farm track near Viscar

- Location within Cornwall
- OS grid reference: SW712332
- Civil parish: Wendron
- Unitary authority: Cornwall
- Ceremonial county: Cornwall
- Region: South West
- Country: England
- Sovereign state: United Kingdom

Viscar is a hamlet in the parish of Wendron, Cornwall, England.
