= Vellanoweth =

Hamlet in Cornwall, England

Coordinates: 50.148°N 5.494°W

Vellanoweth: Cornish: Melinnowydh
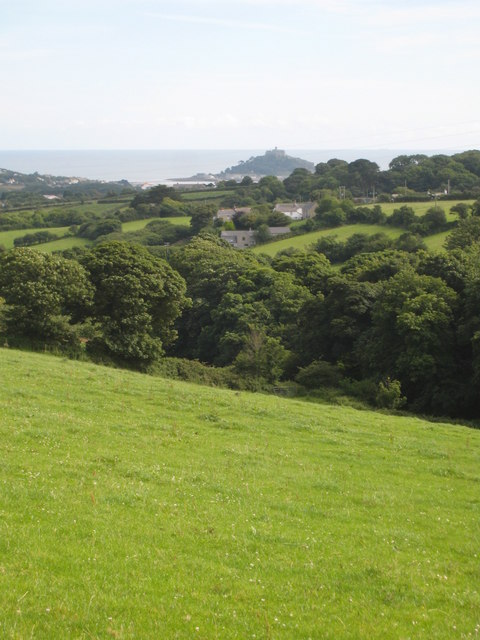
- Pasture near Vellanoweth (St Michael's Mount in the distance)

- Location within Cornwall
- OS grid reference: SW505334
- Unitary authority: Cornwall
- Ceremonial county: Cornwall
- Region: South West
- Country: England
- Sovereign state: United Kingdom

Vellanoweth (Cornish: Melinnowydh, meaning new mill) is a hamlet near Ludgvan in Cornwall, England.
