= Little Brechin =

Coordinates: 56.753143°N 2.683537°W

- Location within Angus
- OS grid reference: NO583626
- Council area: Angus
- Lieutenancy area: Angus
- Country: Scotland
- Sovereign state: United Kingdom
- Post town: BRECHIN
- Postcode district: DD9
- Dialling code: 01356
- Police: Scotland
- Fire: Scottish
- Ambulance: Scottish

Little Brechin is a village in Angus, Scotland. It lies approximately two miles north of Brechin on the north side of the A90 road.

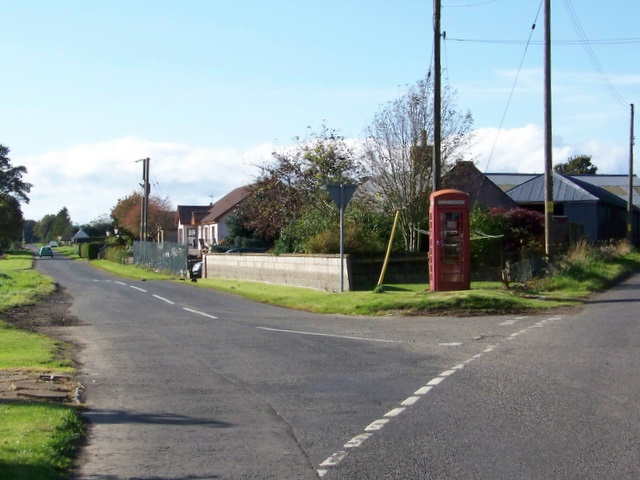
Little Brechin

== See also ==
- Brechin
