= Clare Castle Country Park =

Country park in Suffolk, England

Coordinates: 52.0771°N 0.5837°E

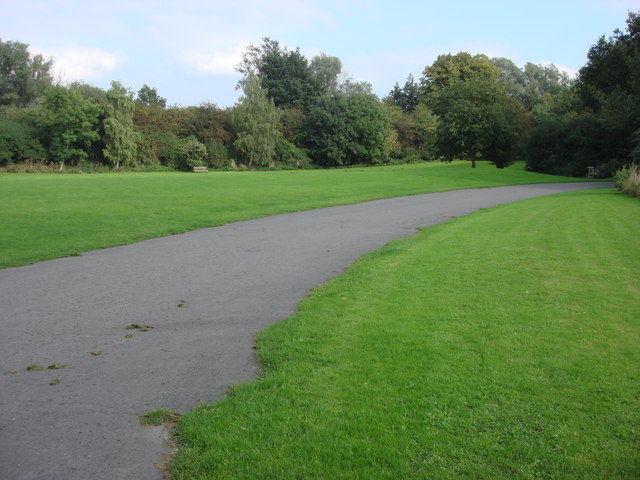
Station Road, Clare Country Park

Clare Castle Country Park in Suffolk, England, was created around the ruins of Clare Castle and incorporates the now defunct Clare railway station on the Colchester to Cambridge branch of the Great Eastern Railway.

There are several walks through the park and along the River Stour, as well as a nature trail, and the park lies on the Stour Valley Path and forms the end of the Bury to Clare walk. There is also a visitors centre in the former station with pictures of the site in former years.
