= Little Bentley =

Village in Essex, England

Coordinates: 51.88963°N 1.07503°E

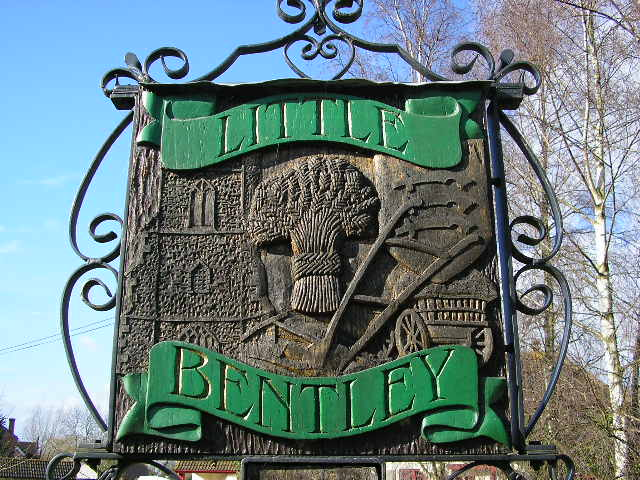

- Location within Essex
- Population: 294 (Parish, 2021)
- OS grid reference: TM117257
- District: Tendring
- Shire county: Essex
- Region: East
- Country: England
- Sovereign state: United Kingdom
- Post town: Colchester
- Postcode district: CO7
- Dialling code: 01206

Little Bentley is a village and civil parish in the Tendring district of Essex, England. It sits on rising ground just to the west of the Holland Brook. At the 2021 census the parish had a population of 294.

In the Second World War troops and Commandoes sometimes encamped locally, and there was a control post for the anti-aircraft guns around the nearby Gt Bromley radar station. A number of Allied aircraft force-landed in the large field south of the Church, including an American B17 bomber. Several V1 flying bombs also hit the parish.

The Hall, south west of the Church, was once a larger building. It has a large game wood, made up mainly of coppiced chestnut trees. The Hall is nowadays noted for its annual garden show, making use of water features fed by streams from the wood.

In the hamlet of Ravens' Green, 2 miles from the village centre, is a large house formerly known as "the Gamekeepers", for many decades a pub.

Little Bentley is also the home of the Little Bentley Park Polo Club.

== St Mary the Virgin church ==
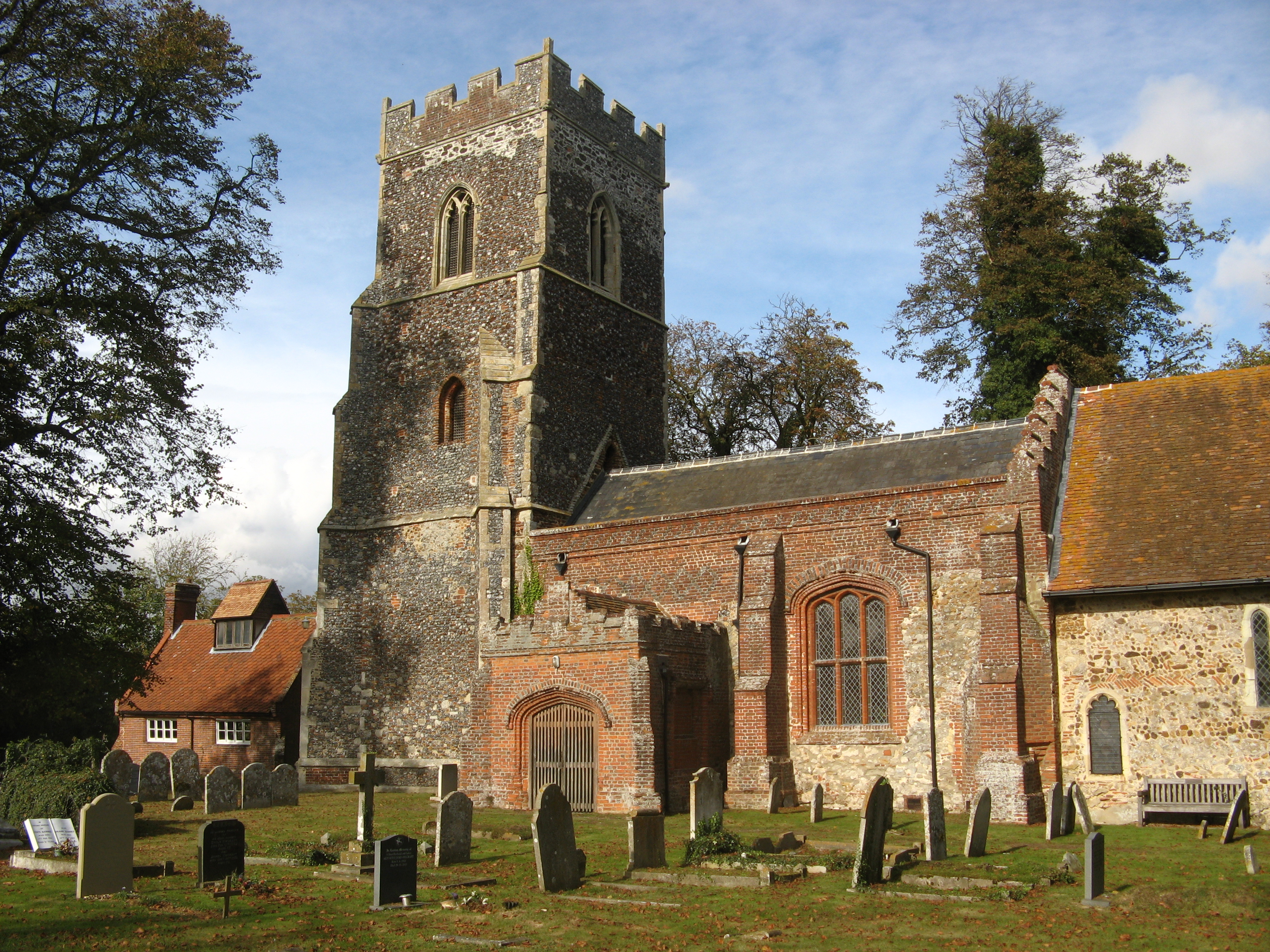
Church of St Mary

The church is dedicated to Saint Mary. The living is in the gift of Balliol College. The Church is mainly 13th century on the north side, and 17th on the south. It has a 60-foot medieval tower with ancient bells.

The nave roof is original medieval timber, and features rows of beams carved into angels, but with heads cut off during the Civil War by Puritan iconoclasts led by William Dowsing. The east end has three stained glass lancet windows, and between chancel and nave a small door and features in the walls indicate the position of a pre-Reformation rood screen. A large royal arms, painted on a diamond-shape timber board, and a 16th-century helmet, are among contents which were stolen – or removed because of the risk of theft – in the 1970s.

There are 5 bells in the tower, three dating from 1599 and the latest was made by Miles Graye of Colchester in 1625.
