= Little London, Suffolk =

Village in Suffolk, England

Coordinates: 52.162772°N 0.996026°E

Little London
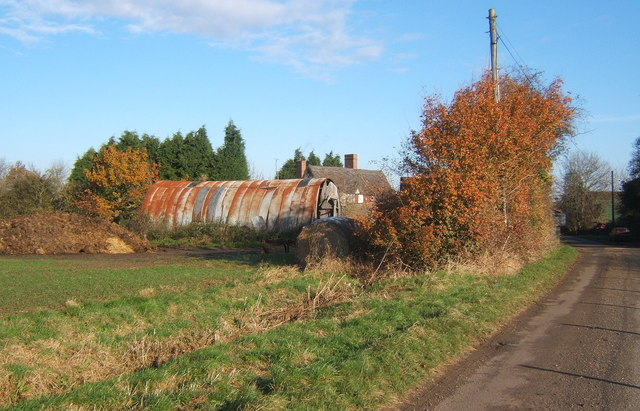
- Scenery on the country lane through Little London

- Location within Suffolk
- District: Mid Suffolk
- Shire county: Suffolk
- Region: East
- Country: England
- Sovereign state: United Kingdom
- Post town: Stowmarket
- Postcode district: IP14
- Dialling code: 01449

Little London is a hamlet in Suffolk, to the south of Combs and Stowmarket. It is in Combs civil parish.
