= Little London, Andover, Hampshire =

Village and parish in Hampshire, England

Coordinates: 51.246726°N 1.456584°W

Little London
- Location within Hampshire
- OS grid reference: SU3802649868
- District: Test Valley
- Shire county: Hampshire
- Region: South East
- Country: England
- Sovereign state: United Kingdom
- Post town: Andover
- Postcode district: SP11 6
- Dialling code: 01264
- Police: Hampshire and Isle of Wight
- Fire: Hampshire and Isle of Wight
- Ambulance: South Central
- UK Parliament: North West Hampshire

Little London is a hamlet and civil parish which lies 3.5 miles north of Andover in Hampshire, England. The hamlet is in the parish of Smannell (where the 2011 Census population was included. ) and has 53 houses. One side of the village has a number of original flint and mortar and thatch-roofed cottages whilst Ridges View is 1960s ex local authority houses. The pub (Horse and Jockey) closed in the 80's and the Post Office also has gone.

The village is set in a beautiful location nestled in a gentle valley in Northern Hampshire. It is surrounded by farmland and has woodland at the top of the village (Doles Wood) and has a single road that runs to Frenches Farm. There are two other 'roads' - Big Street and Little Street (which is now a footpath).

The village dates back to around the late 17th century. Its name suggests that the inhabitants came from London - possibly post the outbreak of plague in 1665 or after the fire of 1666 and settled in the fields outside Andover. There have been over one hundred Little Londons (currently there are 12) in the UK and another one just 12 miles away near Kingsclere, Hampshire.

There is a village well in Little Street that has been capped and there are several other wells on private properties in the village.

Annually there is a Summer Village Fete, annual Christmas light switch on, quiz, and a fireworks night. These are mostly organised by the Little London Playing Field Association. A newly built German all glass Hauf Haus has been recently built and overlooks the village surroundings.

In terms of wildlife, the village has a range of bats, birds including night jars, nuthatches and buzzards, and several different types of deer.

In 2011/2012 the village received high speed, fibre based, broadband services after a successful campaign. Working with Hampshire County Council FTTC capabilities were delivered providing speeds up to 40 Mbit/s. This scheme was retired in 2018 and now Vodafone and BT can provide up to 76mbits.
