= Littleworth, West Sussex =

Hamlet in West Sussex, England

Coordinates: 50.97012°N 0.30353°W

Littleworth
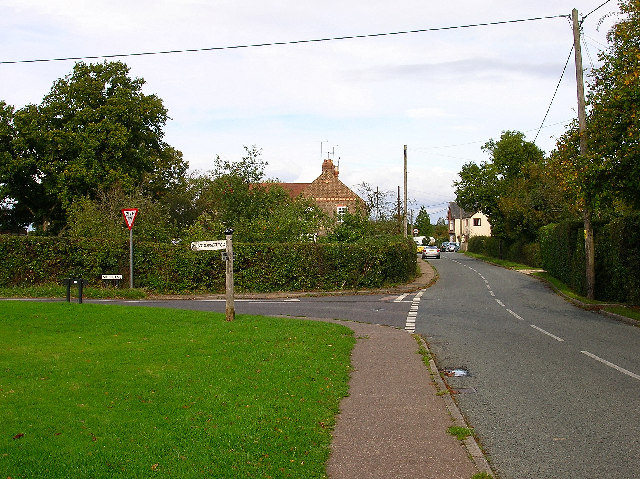

- Location within West Sussex
- OS grid reference: TQ192203
- Civil parish: West Grinstead
- District: Horsham
- Shire county: West Sussex
- Region: South East
- Country: England
- Sovereign state: United Kingdom
- Police: Sussex
- Fire: West Sussex
- Ambulance: South East Coast
- UK Parliament: Arundel and South Downs

Littleworth is a hamlet in the Horsham District of West Sussex, England. It lies on the Partridge Green to Maplehurst road 2.9 miles (4.7 km) north of Henfield.

== History ==
Like much of the West Grinstead parish, Littleworth developed as a post-18th century hamlet in a rural area characterized by scattered farmsteads, medieval lands, and Weald Clay woodland.

== Landmarks ==
This hamlet includes:

- the Windmill Inn, a pub and bed & breakfast in the area. The local landmark derives its name from the historic Jolesfield Windmill, a traditional Smock mill that stood nearby in the 19th century before being dismantled and relocated. In October of 2026, it got the Tripadvisor Travelers' Choice Award and selected for the CAMRA Good Beer Guide.
- Minster Cottages 1-6, which is a row of residential cottages that are officially protected as Grade II listed buildings.
