= Vernham Street =

Village in Hampshire, England

Coordinates: 51°18′55″N 1°29′57″W

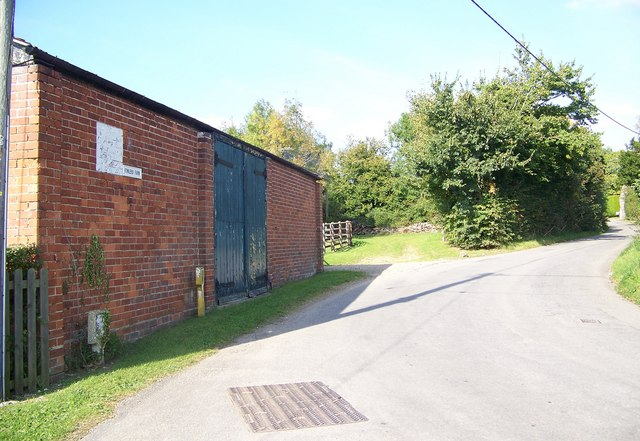

- Location within Hampshire
- OS grid reference: SU3499657457
- District: Test Valley
- Shire county: Hampshire
- Region: South East
- Country: England
- Sovereign state: United Kingdom
- Post town: ANDOVER
- Postcode district: SP11
- Dialling code: 01264
- Police: Hampshire and Isle of Wight
- Fire: Hampshire and Isle of Wight
- Ambulance: South Central
- UK Parliament: North West Hampshire

Vernham Street is a small village in the civil parish of Vernhams Dean situated in the North Wessex Downs Area of Outstanding Natural Beauty in the Test Valley district of Hampshire, England. Its nearest town is Andover, which lies approximately 7 1/2 miles (12.1 km) south-east from the village, although it lies one mile closer to Hungerford, Berkshire.
