= Littleworth, Cannock =

Coordinates: 52.705°N 1.978°W

Littleworth
- Village
- Location within Staffordshire
- Shire county: Staffordshire
- Region: West Midlands
- Country: England
- Sovereign state: United Kingdom
- Police: Staffordshire
- Fire: Staffordshire
- Ambulance: West Midlands

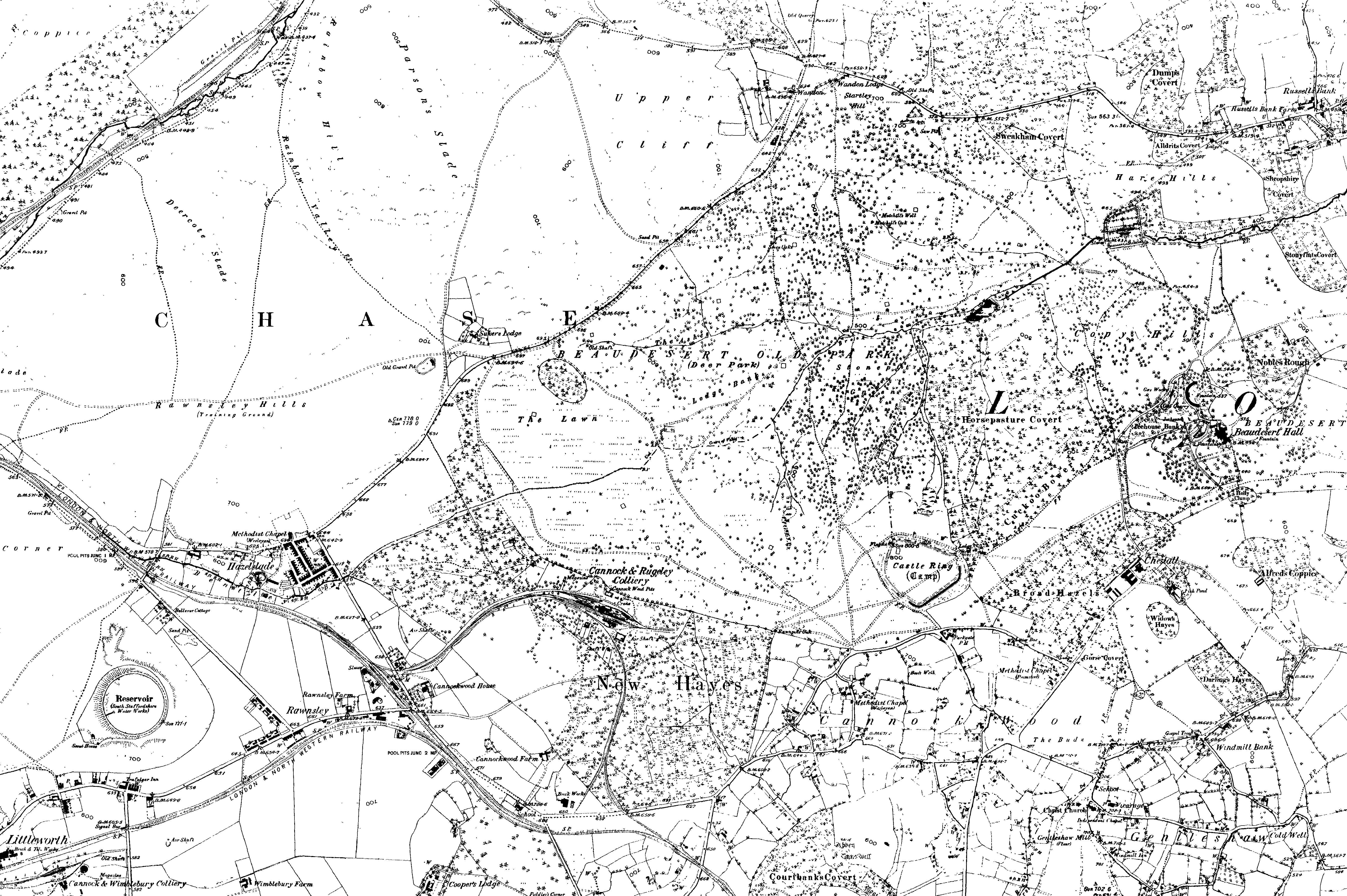
Map of Staffordshire OS Map 1883-1894

Littleworth is an area of Cannock Chase District, Staffordshire, England. The area is mainly residential and industrial. It is located between Wimblebury and Hazelslade. There is a bus service that connects the area with Cannock and Burntwood. The nearest railway station is in Cannock. There is also traces of the former mineral line which ran through the area to Norton Junction from the Chase Line. It is traceable from Nelson Drive and can be seen on Google Maps as a row of trees.
