= Shelderton =

Hamlet in Shropshire, England

Coordinates: 52.394°N 2.874°W

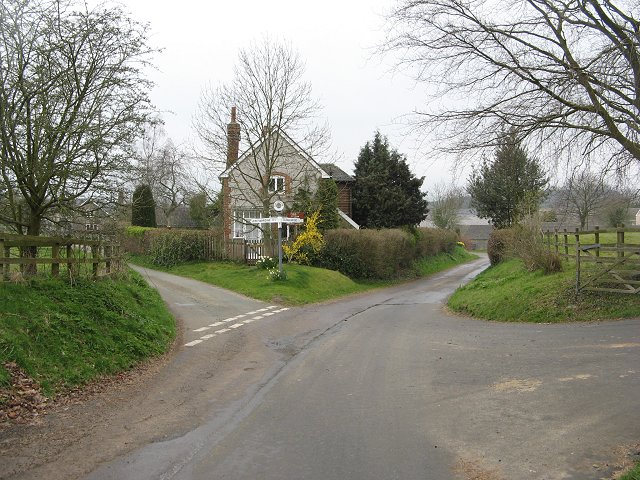
- Finger signpost in Shelderton — lanes lead to Clungunford, Leintwardine and Onibury

- Location within Shropshire
- OS grid reference: SO405777
- Civil parish: Clungunford
- Unitary authority: Shropshire
- Ceremonial county: Shropshire
- Region: West Midlands
- Country: England
- Sovereign state: United Kingdom
- Post town: CRAVEN ARMS
- Postcode district: SY7
- Dialling code: 01547
- Police: West Mercia
- Fire: Shropshire
- Ambulance: West Midlands
- UK Parliament: Ludlow

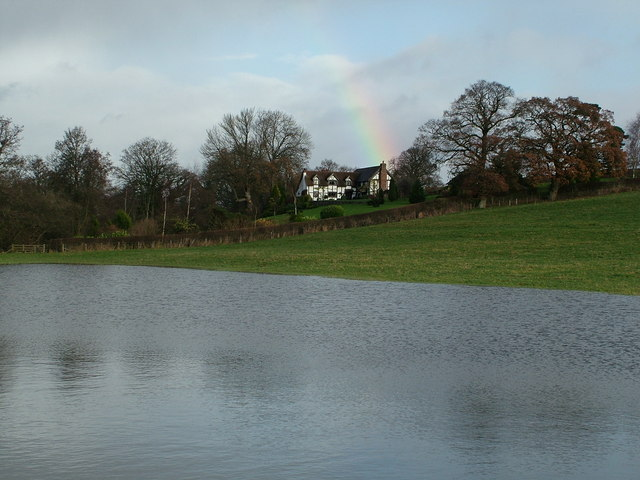
The Lynches with the River Clun in flood below.

Shelderton is a hamlet in south Shropshire, England. It is located just southeast of the village of Clungunford and is part of that village's civil parish.

It was a medieval township and belonged to Munslow hundred.

The border with Herefordshire is nearby to the south. The small hamlet of Little Common is near to Shelderton, on the B4367 road, and is connected with Shelderton by a footpath (grid reference SO398776). Also on the B4367, near to where the Leintwardine lane from Shelderton meets the B4367, is a Grade II Listed house called The Lynches (grid reference SO396769).

The nearest market towns are Craven Arms and Ludlow.

A Roman road runs through Shelderton, on its way between the Roman fort and settlement at Leintwardine and the city at Wroxeter.

There is a Royal Mail post box in the hamlet.
