= Littlecote, Buckinghamshire =

Historic village in Buckinghamshire, England

Coordinates: 51.912°N 0.793°W

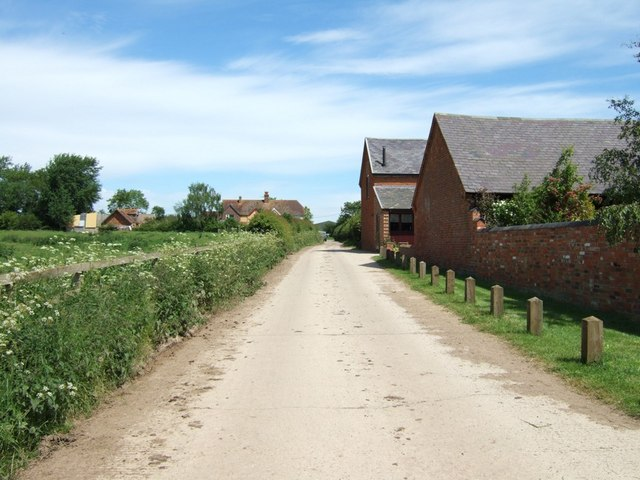
Littlecote Lane, which passes the former Littlecote Farm; to the left was the site of the deserted mediæval village of Lidcote

Littlecote, in the English county of Buckinghamshire, also known as Lidcote, was a village about eight miles north of Aylesbury. A settlement with ten households was recorded in the Domesday Book of 1086. In the late 15th century, the landowner, Thomas Pigott, started to enclose land for sheep grazing, which was for him a profitable use of the land. By 1507, enclosure had been completed and the village had been depopulated and destroyed.

The present settlement consists of a farm and a dispersed hamlet, in Stewkley parish.
