= Dormition of the Theotokos Church =

Dormition of the Theotokos Church, or Dormition of the Mother of God Church may refer to:

== Albania ==
- Dormition Cathedral, Berat
- Dormition Church, Sopik
- Dormition of the Theotokos Church, Labovë e Kryqit

== Bosnia and Herzegovina ==
- Church of the Dormition of the Theotokos, Tuzla

== Bulgaria ==
- Cathedral Church of the Dormition of the Holy Mother of God (Bogoroditsa), Plovdiv
- Dormition of the Theotokos Church, Targovishte
- Dormition of the Theotokos Cathedral, Varna

== Croatia ==
- Church of the Dormition of the Theotokos, Negoslavci

== France ==
- Église de la Dormition-de-la-Mère-de-Dieu, Sainte-Geneviève-des-Bois

== Georgia ==
- Lykhny Church, Lykhny (Abkhazia)
- Tbilisi Sioni Cathedral

== Greece ==
- Church of the Pantanassa, Athens
- Protaton in Karyes, Mount Athos

== Israel ==
- Abbey of the Dormition, Jerusalem

== North Macedonia ==
- Dormition of the Theotokos Church, Novo Selo, Štip

== Poland ==
- Dormition Church, Dubiny

== Romania ==
- Dormition of the Theotokos Cathedral, Cluj-Napoca
- Dormition of the Theotokos Cathedral, Giurgiu
- Dormition of the Theotokos Cathedral, Satu Mare
- Dormition of the Theotokos Church, Alba Iulia
- Dormition of the Theotokos Church, Constanța
- Dormition of the Theotokos Church, Focșani
- Donie Church, Focșani
- Dormition of the Theotokos Church, Orăștie
- Dormition of the Theotokos Church, Sighetu Marmației
- Dormition of the Theotokos Church, Strei
- Dormition of the Theotokos Church, Zalău

== Russia ==
- Dormition Church, Kondopoga, a wooden church built in 1774 which burned in 2018
- Church of the Dormition of the Mother of God (Saint Petersburg)

== Ukraine ==
- Church of the Tithes, Kyiv
- Pyrohoshcha Dormition of the Mother of God Church, Kyiv
- Dormition Church, Lviv

== United Kingdom ==
- The Greek Orthodox Cathedral of the Dormition of the Mother of God, Wood Green, London

== See also ==
- Cathedral of the Dormition of the Theotokos (disambiguation)
- Monastery of the Dormition of the Theotokos (disambiguation)
- Cathedral of the Theotokos (disambiguation)
- Dormition of the Theotokos (disambiguation)
- Dormition (disambiguation)
- Assumption (disambiguation)
- Church of the Assumption (disambiguation)
- Cathedral of the Assumption (disambiguation)
