= Theotokos (disambiguation) =

Theotokos is a title of Mary, mother of Jesus, used especially in Eastern Christianity.

Theotokos may also refer to:

- Cathedral of the Theotokos, a list of cathedrals
- Cathedral of the Dormition of the Theotokos, a list of cathedrals
- Cathedral of the Nativity of the Theotokos, a list of cathedrals
- Monastery of the Dormition of the Theotokos, a list of monasteries
- Entry of the Theotokos into the Temple Church, a list of several Orthodox churches
- Intercession of the Theotokos, a Christian feast of the Mother of God celebrated in the Eastern Orthodox and Byzantine Catholic Churches on October 14
- Rule of the Theotokos, a Christian prayer of the Eastern Orthodox
- Theotokos Euergetis Monastery, a monastery in the European suburbs of the Byzantine capital, Constantinople
- Theotokos of Tolga, a Russian Orthodox icon representing the Virgin Mary with the infant Jesus Christ
