= Assumption =

Assumption, in Christianity, refers to the Assumption of Mary, a belief in the taking up of the Virgin Mary into heaven.

Assumption may also refer to:

== Places ==
- Assumption, Alberta, Canada
- Assumption, Illinois, United States
  - Assumption Township, Christian County, Illinois
- Assumption Island, Seychelles
  - Assumption Island Airport
- Assumption, Minnesota, United States
- Assumption, Nebraska, United States
- Assumption, Ohio, United States
- Assumption Parish, Louisiana, United States

== Arts, entertainment, and media ==
- "Assumption" (short story), a 1929 story by Samuel Beckett
- Assumption of Moses, a Jewish apocryphal pseudepigraphical work of uncertain date and authorship
- "Assumptions" (Doctors), a 2003 television episode
- Assumption (film), a 2017 short film by Anthony Leone
- "Assumptions" (Law & Order: Special Victims Unit), a 2019 television episode
- "Assumptions" (song), 2021 song by Sam Gellaitry

== Churches ==
- Assumption Chapel, Minnesota, United States
- Assumption of the Blessed Virgin Mary Church, Michigan, United States
- Assumption – St. Paul, New York, United States
- Cathedral of the Assumption (disambiguation)
- Church of the Assumption (disambiguation)

== Logic ==
- Closed-world assumption, the presumption that a statement that is true is also known to be true, and a statement not known to be true is false
- Open-world assumption, assumption that the truth value of a statement may be true irrespective of whether or not it is known to be true
- Tacit assumption, belief applied in developing a logical argument or decision that is not explicitly voiced nor necessarily understood by the decision maker
  - Presupposition, a tacit assumption about the world or background belief relating to an utterance
- Unique name assumption, in logics where different names always refer to different entities in the world
- Responsibility assumption

== Schools ==
=== Australia ===
- Assumption College, Kilmore, Victoria
- Assumption College, Warwick, Queensland

=== Canada ===
- Assumption Catholic Secondary School, Burlington, Ontario
- Assumption College School, Windsor, Ontario
- Assumption College School (Brantford), Ontario
- Assumption University (Windsor, Ontario)

=== Japan ===
- Assumption Junior College, Osaka Prefecture

=== Philippines ===
- Assumption Antipolo
- Assumption College of Davao, Davao City
- Assumption College San Lorenzo, Makati City
- Assumption Iloilo, Iloilo City
- University of the Assumption, Pampanga

=== Singapore ===
- Assumption English School

=== Thailand ===
- Assumption College Sriracha, Chonburi Province
- Assumption College (Thailand)
- Assumption University (Thailand), Bangkok

=== UK (Northern Ireland) ===
- Assumption Grammar School, Ballynahinch, County Down, Northern Ireland

=== United States ===
- Academy of the Assumption, Florida
- Assumption Catholic School, Roman Catholic Archdiocese of Galveston–Houston
- Assumption University, Massachusetts
- Assumption College for Sisters, New Jersey
- Assumption High School (Iowa)
- Assumption High School (Kentucky)
- Assumption High School (Louisiana)
- Assumption High School (Wisconsin)
- Assumption Preparatory School, Massachusetts
- Assumption School, Illinois
- Assumption School (Saint Paul, Minnesota)

== See also ==
- Dormition (disambiguation)
- Asunción, the Spanish word
- Axiom
- Assumption Cathedral (disambiguation)
- Church of the Assumption (disambiguation)
- Debt Assumption, the US policy under Alexander Hamilton to assume the war debt of some states
- Entering heaven alive
- L'Assomption River, Quebec, Canada
- List of churches consecrated to Santa Maria Assunta ("Assunta" is the Italian for Assumption)
- Presupposition
- Proposition
