= Assumption School (disambiguation) =

Assumption School was a Catholic elementary school in Chicago, Illinois from 1899 to 1945.

Assumption School may also refer to the following schools in the United States:

- Assumption School (Saint Paul, Minnesota)

== See also ==
- Assumption Catholic High School (disambiguation)
- Assumption College (disambiguation)
- Assumption High School (disambiguation)
- Assumption Preparatory School, Worcester, Massachusetts
- Our Lady of the Assumption School, Carencro, Louisiana
