= Dormition of the Mother of God (disambiguation) =

Dormition of the Mother of God is a major Christian feast.

Dormition of the Mother of God or Dormition of the Theotokos may also refer to:

- Cathedral of the Dormition of the Theotokos (disambiguation)
- Dormition of the Theotokos Church (disambiguation)
- Monastery of the Dormition of the Theotokos (disambiguation)

== See also ==
- Church of the Mother of God (disambiguation)
- Cathedral of the Mother of God (disambiguation)
- Dormition (disambiguation)
- Assumption (disambiguation)
