= Cathedral of the Dormition of the Theotokos =

Cathedral of the Dormition of the Theotokos or Cathedral of the Dormition of the Mother of God may refer to:

- Cathedral of Dormition of St. Mary (Berat), Albania
- Cathedral of the Dormition, Sofia, Bulgaria
- Dormition of the Mother of God Cathedral, Varna, Bulgaria
- Dormition Cathedral, Helsinki or Uspenski Cathedral, Finland
- Cathedral of the Dormition, Kutaisi or Bagrati Cathedral, Georgia
- Cathedral of the Dormition, Tbilisi or Tbilisi Sioni Cathedral, Georgia
- Dormition of the Theotokos Cathedral, Cluj-Napoca, Romania
- Dormition of the Theotokos Cathedral, Giurgiu, the seat of the Romanian Orthodox Bishop of Giurgiu, Romania
- Dormition of the Theotokos Cathedral, Satu Mare, a Romanian Orthodox religious building in Satu Mare, Romania
- Dormition Cathedral, Moscow, Russia
- Dormition Cathedral, Vladimir, Russia
- Dormition Cathedral in Smolensk, Russia
- Dormition Cathedral, Staraya Ladoga, Russia
- Dormition Cathedral, Omsk, one of the largest churches in Siberia
- Dormition Cathedral, Khabarovsk, Russia
- Dormition Cathedral, Kharkiv, Ukraine
- Cathedral of the Dormition (Pechersk Lavra), part of the Kyiv Pechersk Lavra monastery in Ukraine
- Birmingham Orthodox Cathedral, formally Cathedral Church of the Dormition of the Mother of God and St. Andrew, Birmingham, United Kingdom
- Dormition Cathedral, London, Russian Orthodox cathedral also known as Cathedral of the Dormition of the Mother of God and All Saints
- St Mary's Greek Orthodox Church, Wood Green, London, United Kingdom, also known as The Greek Orthodox Cathedral of the Dormition of the Mother of God

== See also ==
- Cathedral of the Assumption (disambiguation)
- Church of the Dormition of the Theotokos (disambiguation)
- Monastery of the Dormition of the Theotokos (disambiguation)
- Cathedral of the Theotokos (disambiguation)
- Dormition of the Theotokos (disambiguation)
- Dormition (disambiguation)
- Assumption (disambiguation)
