= Church of the Dormition =

Church of the Dormition may refer to:

- Church of the Dormition of the Theotokos (disambiguation), a list of churches dedicated to the Dormition of the Mother of God
- Church of the Dormition of Saint Anne, any church dedicated to the Dormition of Saint Anne

== See also ==
- Dormition (disambiguation)
- Cathedral of the Dormition of the Theotokos (disambiguation)
