= Donie =

Donie may refer to:

== People ==
- Donie Buckley, Gaelic footballer
- Donie Bush, American baseball player
- Donie Cassidy, Irish politician
- Donie Murphy, Gaelic footballer
- Donie O'Donovan, Gaelic football manager
- Donie Ryan, Irish hurler
- Donie Shine, Gaelic football manager
- Scott Donie, American diver

== Places ==
- Donie Church, a Romanian Orthodox church
- Donie, Texas, an unincorporated area

== See also ==
- Donal Courtney, Irish actor
- Donald Walsh, Irish marathon runner
- Donie O'Sullivan (disambiguation)
- Nancy Jewel McDonie, Korean-American actress and singer
