= Cristina Saralegui =

American journalist (born 1948)

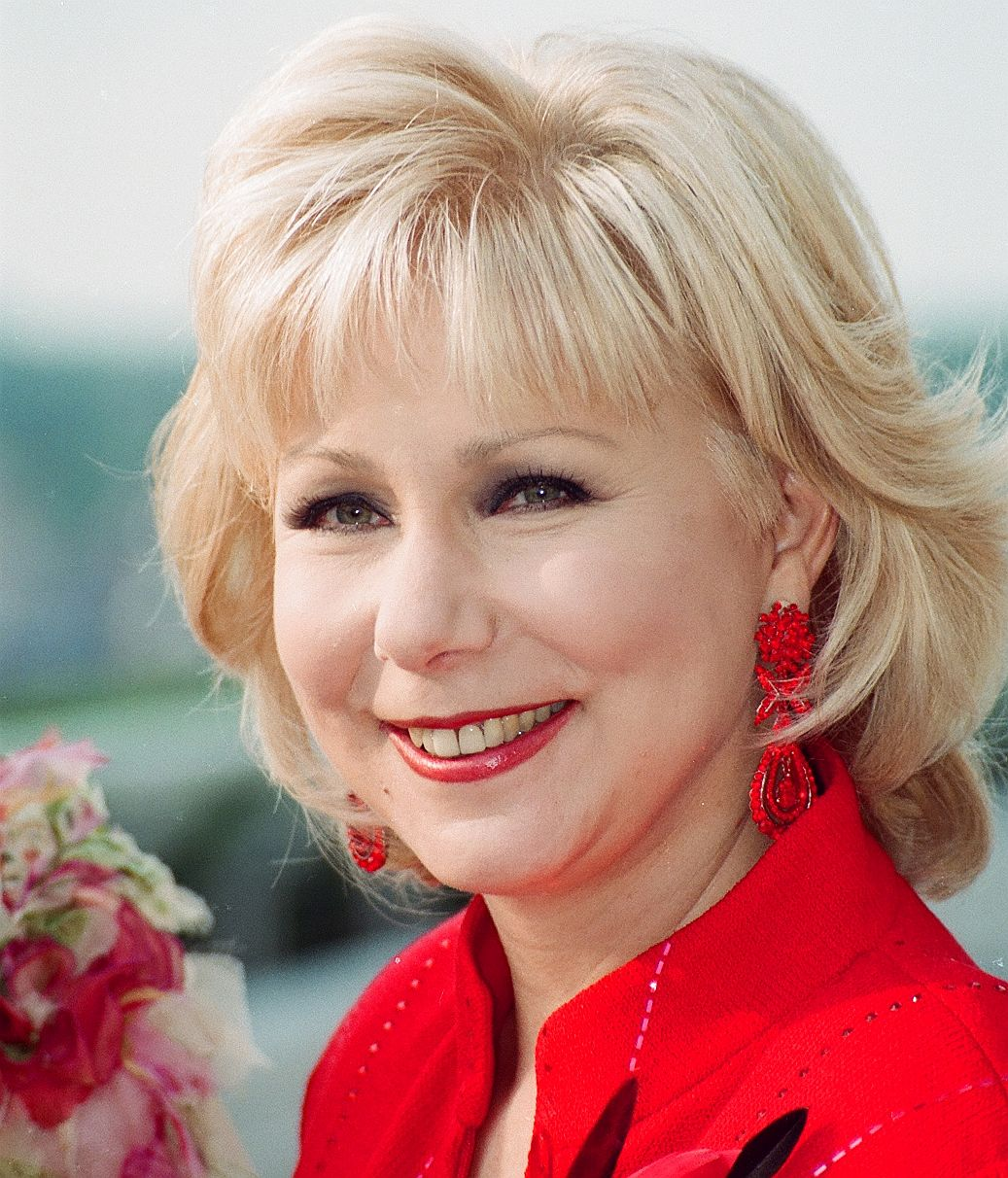
- Saralegui in 2001
- Born: Cristina María Saralegui Santamarina; January 29, 1948 (age 78); Miramar, Havana, Cuba
- Citizenship: Cuba; United States
- Education: University of Miami
- Occupations: Journalist, actress, talk show host, TV personality
- Years active: 1973–present
- Spouse(s): Tony Menendez (divorced) Marcos Ávila (m. 1982)
- Children: 2 (and 1 stepdaughter)
- Website: cristinaonline.com

Cristina María Saralegui de Ávila (born Cristina María Saralegui Santamarina; January 29, 1948) is a Cuban-born American journalist, television personality, actress and talk show host of the Spanish-language eponymous show, El show de Cristina. Before her television career, she worked for ten years as editor-in-chief of the Spanish-language version of Cosmopolitan magazine distributed throughout Latin America.

== Early life and family ==
Cristina María Saralegui Santamarina was born in Miramar, Havana, Cuba, to Francisco Rene Saralegui Álvarez, Jr. and María Cristina de las Nieves Santamarina Díaz. She is the eldest of five, she has two sisters, Vicky and María Eugenia, as well as two brothers, Patxi and Iñaki. Saralegui is descended from Basque Country ancestors, with all four of her grandparents having origins in Spain. Her paternal grandfather Francisco Saralegui Arizubieta was Basque, from Lizarza and her paternal grandmother Amalia "Amalita" Álvarez Cuesta, an Asturian from Gijón; her maternal grandfather was José Santamarina Iviricu, and her maternal grandmother Águeda Díaz.

In 1960, following the Cuban Revolution, Saralegui and her family fled to Miami, Florida, United States, and settled on Key Biscayne.

== Journalism career ==
After graduating from the Academy of the Assumption in 1966, Saralegui enrolled at the University of Miami. In 1973, she began an internship at the magazine Vanidades. This allowed her to improve her written Spanish to the level of her spoken language. By 1979, Saralegui was appointed editor of the Spanish version of Cosmopolitan magazine, working out of Miami and having been officially welcomed into the fold by Cosmopolitan U.S. editor Helen Gurley Brown, who received her at a party in New York City. She continued in this role through most of the 1980s. Her close relationship at Cosmopolitan with Helen Gurley Brown was a mentor-type relationship, and Cristina Saralegui was labeled for a time as "the Latin Helen Gurley Brown".

While editor of Cosmopolitan, Saralegui sought to give information to Latin American audiences about important topics, such as sexual and mental health, which Saralegui felt were not typically discussed enough in Latin families. This sometimes put her at odds with Gurley Brown, whose approach to the English-language magazine was more sexually forward, while Saralegui recognized that there were still many facets of "liberation" Latin women still had not attained.

== El Show de Cristina ==
In 1989, Saralegui transferred her journalistic success to television, by launching the Miami-based Spanish-language talk show, El Show de Cristina (The Cristina Show) on Univision. She concluded each episode with a double thumbs-up salute and the Cuban expression "Pa'lante, pa'lante, pa'tras ni pa' coger impulso", ("Forward, forward; don't step back, not even to gain momentum"...could also be understood as "to get a running start".)

Prominent guests included Selena, Paulina Rubio, Don Francisco, the former members of Menudo, Fernando Colunga, Edith González, Shakira, Lucero, Celia Cruz, Camilo Sesto, Thalía, Olga Tañón, Isabel Pantoja, Julio Iglesias, Jaci Velasquez, Alejandro Fernández, Enrique Iglesias, Pitbull, Sussan Taunton, Jorge Ramos, Gloria Estefan and her husband Emilio Estefan, Jr., Gloria Trevi, Chayanne, Sebastian Rulli, Xuxa, Ricky Martin, RBD, Niurka, Noelia, Anaís, George Lopez, Jennifer Lopez, Adela Noriega, Grecia Colmenares, Alexandra Cheron, Amelia Vega, Angélica Vale, Angélica María, Baby Rasta and Susana Gonzalez.

During the program recorded on Monday, October 25, 2010, Cristina reviewed her career and the program's more memorable episodes and guests.

Saragelui's talk show last aired on November 1, 2010, after 21 years. Hosted by Mexican actor Fernando Colunga, Cristina was celebrated by her colleagues Daniela Romo, Cesar Evora, Thalia, Shakira, Gloria Estefan, Emilio Estefan, Angelica Maria, Carmen Salinas, Don Francisco, Jorge Ramos, and others. Some of her Univision colleagues were in the audience, from where they interacted with Cristina herself, sharing anecdotes and messages of hope and admiration.

Saralegui went on to publish her own magazine, Cristina: La Revista (Cristina: The Magazine) and several books. She is referred to as "the Spanish-Cuban Oprah".

In 1992, Saralegui had an English-language syndicated talk show, Cristina, which was cancelled after half a season.

The song Somos El Mundo premiered during Saralegui's show, with an appeal to help the Haiti relief effort. It was translated by Gloria Estefan, produced by her husband Emilio Estefan and approved by Quincy Jones.

During her last show on Univision, Saralegui said,

Cristina no se retira, jamas dejaría esto... aquí hay Cristina y ¡para rato! (Cristina does not retire, I would never leave this... there is (still) Cristina and for a (good) while!).

Saralegui remained under contract with Univision until December 31, 2010. It was discussed that she might continue as a collaborator, for special programs and interviews, and that a new Cristina show would debut in March, 2011, but this did not happen.

== Career after Univision ==
The Spanish-language Network Azteca América presented a one-hour special, "Cristina Breaks the Silence" where, for the first time since her retirement from Univision, Saralegui was interviewed on television. The interview, hosted by Frank Cairo, a former producer and creator of the Cristina show, touched on many issues, from guests who were considered "difficult", to the unexpected announcement from the executives of Univision that her show was being canceled, as well as reactions, emotions, and responses to the news.

It was announced on May 17, 2011 that Telemundo had hired Cristina for a weekly variety show, Pa' lante con Cristina (Forward with Cristina), beginning in the fall of 2011. The program debuted on Telemundo on May 31 of that year, hosting a one-hour special retrospective featuring the stars of the just-completed telenovela La Reina del Sur.

On May 31, 2012, it was announced that Pa' lante con Cristina would end its run and would not be renewed for another season.

In 2012, Saralegui began Cristina Radio on SiriusXM.

In June 2012, Saralegui endorsed President Barack Obama for a second term, marking her first political endorsement ever.

=== Television ===
Year	Title	Role	Notes
2001	Taina	Principal Rojas	3 episodes: Be Careful What You Wish For (can be heard on the intercom), I Want it that Way, and Undercover
2001	Passions	(Tía) Cristina López	9 episodes, aunt of Pilar Lopez-Fitzgerald (Eva Tamargo).
2003	George Lopez	Lydia Lopez	2 episodes: George Has Two Mommies and Would You Like a Drumstick or a Kidney?

=== Web presence ===
Saralegui has joined with AARP to help raise awareness, within the Latino community, about the benefits AARP has to offer. They have created ¡Amigos Live!, an online interactive video.

== Personal life ==
She is divorced from her first husband, Tony, with whom she has a daughter Cristina Amelia. She has been married to Marcos Ávila since 1982, a former member of the Miami Sound Machine, and from this marriage she has a stepdaughter, Stephanie. Together they have one child, son Jon Marcos.
