= Dubiny =

- Village
- Location within Poland
- Coordinates: 52°46′N 23°36′E
- Country: Poland
- Voivodeship: Podlaskie
- County: Hajnówka
- Gmina: Hajnówka

Dubiny [duˈbʲinɨ] is a village in the administrative district of Gmina Hajnówka, in Hajnówka County, Podlaskie Voivodeship in northeastern Poland, close to its border with Belarus. It is approximately 3 km (2 mi) north of Hajnówka and 49 km (30 mi) southeast of the regional capital Białystok.

One of its most notable landmarks is the Dormition Church, known for its decoration and for the Dormition celebrations that take place there every year.
