= Monastery of the Dormition of the Theotokos =

Monastery of the Dormition of the Theotokos may refer to:

- Abbey of the Dormition, Jerusalem
- Monastery of the Dormition of the Theotokos, Čajniče, Bosnia and Herzegovina
- Monastery of the Dormition of the Theotokos, Dobrun, Bosnia and Herzegovina
- Monastery of the Dormition of the Theotokos, Tvrdoš, Bosnia and Herzegovina
- Simonov Monastery of the Dormition of the Theotokos, Russia (Moscow)
- Dormition of Theotokos Monastery, Penteli, Greece
- Monastery of Dormition of the Theotokos, Himmelsthür, Germany
- St. Mary's Monastery, Zvërnec
- Kirillo-Belozersky Monastery
- Pskov-Caves Monastery
- Dormition Monastery, Tikhvin
- Mega Spilaio
- Humor Monastery

== See also ==
- Church of the Dormition of the Theotokos (disambiguation)
- Cathedral of the Dormition of the Theotokos (disambiguation)
- Dormition (disambiguation)
- Assumption (disambiguation)
