= Assumption Catholic High School =

Assumption Catholic High School may refer to:

- Assumption Catholic Secondary School in Burlington, Ontario
- Assumption College School in Windsor, Ontario
- Assumption High School other schools without Catholic in the formal name
