= Diocese of Giurgiu =

The Diocese of Giurgiu (Romanian: Episcopia Giurgiului) is a diocese of the Romanian Orthodox Church. Its see is the Dormition of the Theotokos Cathedral in Giurgiu and its ecclesiastical territory covers Giurgiu County. The diocese forms part of the Metropolis of Muntenia and Dobrudja. It was established in 2000, and placed under a vicar bishop, Ambrozie Sinaitul, who in 2006 became the diocese's first bishop.
