= Greek Secondary School of London =

Location
- 22 Trinity Road; Wood Green; London, N22 8LB; England

Information
- Type: Independent School
- Established: 1983
- Local authority: Haringey
- Department for Education URN: 101959 Tables
- Age: 12 to 18
- Enrolment: 78

The Greek Secondary School of London (Greek: Eλληνικό Γυμνάσιο - Λύκειο Λονδίνου) is an Independent School for children aged 12 to 18, located in North London, Wood Green, 22 Trinity Road, London N22 8LB, U.K.

It was established in 1983 by the Greek Embassy. It functions according to the Greek Ministry of Education and follows the Greek curriculum. It consists of junior high school with three grades (Greek: Γυμνάσιο) and high school with three grades (Greek: Λύκειο). At the end of the third grade of Junior High School, students receive the Junior High School Certificate (απολυτήριο γυμνασίου). After having attended the third grade of High School they receive the High School Certificate (απολυτήριο λυκείου) which gives them access to the British universities as well as Greek universities and Greek technological educational institutes. These certificates are equivalent to GCSE and A-Levels to junior high school certificate and high school certificates, respectively. All classes are taught in Greek. English and French are also taught at school with priority to English which is taught three times a week.

The school's original location was in West Acton. In 1991, it was relocated at Avenue Lodge in Wood Green. Since 2012, it is currently located at Wood Green, beside St Mary's Church. In London there are also: the Greek Νursery School and the Greek Primary School which are still located in West Acton, 3 Pierrepoint Road.
