= Dormition of the Theotokos Church, Focșani =

Heritage site in Vrancea County, Romania

Coordinates: 45°41′36″N 27°10′30″E

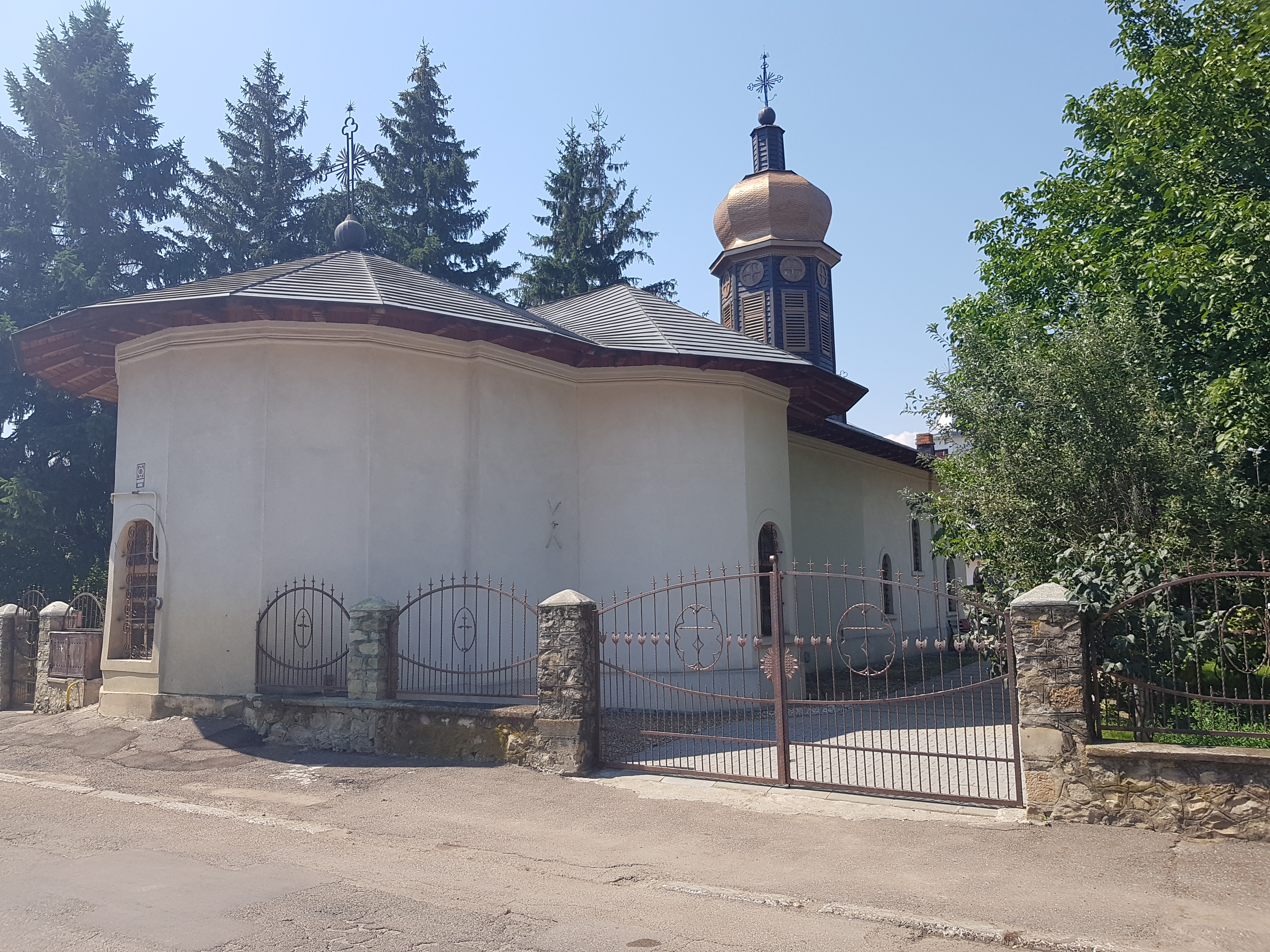
Dormition of the Theotokos Church

The Dormition of the Theotokos Church (Romanian: Biserica Adormirea Maicii Domnului) is a Romanian Orthodox church located at 3 Rodnei Street in Focșani, Romania. It is dedicated to the Dormition of the Theotokos.

The church was built in 1760–1770. It is listed as a historic monument by Romania's Ministry of Culture and Religious Affairs.
