= Dormition of the Theotokos Church, Orăștie =

Heritage site in Hunedoara County, Romania

Coordinates: 45.84247°N 23.19871°E

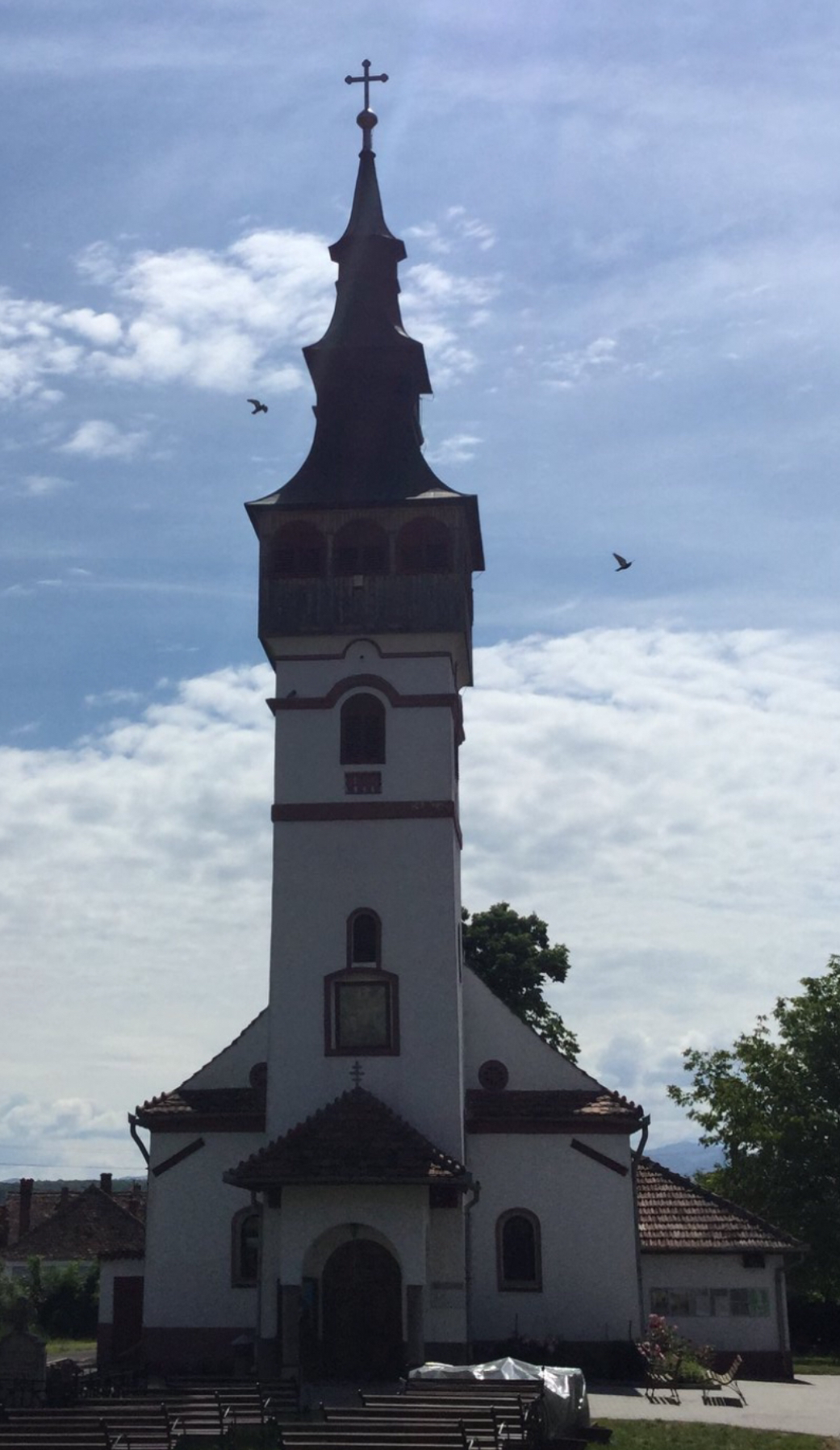
Dormition of the Theotokos Church

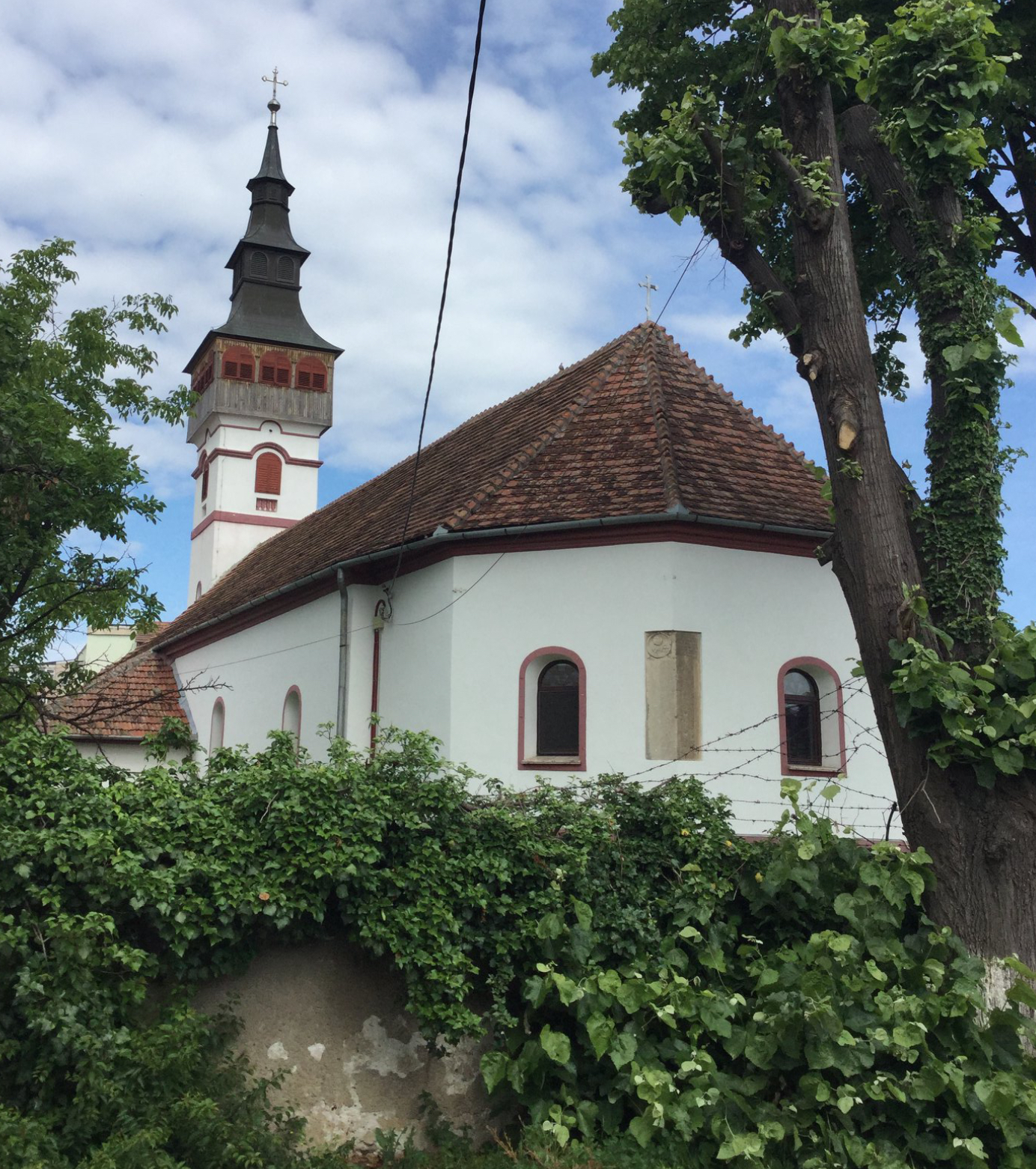
Rear view of the church

The Dormition of the Theotokos Church (Romanian: Biserica Adormirea Maicii Domnului) is a Romanian Orthodox church located at 4A Unirii Street, Orăștie, Romania. It is dedicated to the Dormition of the Theotokos.

== Architecture ==
The church is typical of contemporary Transylvania architecture, a Gothic hall church inspired by the Transylvanian Saxons. It features an altar separated from the nave by an iconostasis, a vestibule with a spire, and a small entrance porch to the west. The main part is made of stone, the arches and spire of brick. The floor is around 80 centimeters below ground level. The soil is lower on the north side, suggesting the earlier presence of a cemetery.

The altar exterior has five sides and a semicircular interior, with three arched windows and two niches at the north and south. The spire, which houses the bells, was built on older foundations in 1873, rising to 35 meters. It features four levels of arched windows. The architectural decoration is simple. The interior frescoes were painted in 1977–1979, in neo-Byzantine style.

== Features ==
There is a gravestone fixed into the exterior altar apse wall, laid along an angle. It probably comes from the old cemetery, or from an earlier church, and was likely placed in its current position in 1802, when the church was expanded. Commemorating benefactors and ktetors, it has two inscriptions: one in Latin from 1705, the other in Romanian Cyrillic from 1802. The first part is decorated with a family coat of arms belonging to the deceased Maria Görög (Grecu), who, according to the text, was either from the minor nobility of Făgăraș, or from a wealthy merchant family, and died in 1701. The second part mentions her parents; her father Petru came from Tarnovo, supervised the Greek merchants of Transylvania and lived at Orăștie in 1705. The Romanian text mentions several local priests as well as the church founders.

Another inscription above the entrance is much more recent. The iconostasis, in local Baroque style, has lavish decorations carved into the wood, and is gilt. The altar burned around 1800, and the iconostasis mentions a date of 1811; it was probably executed by an itinerant Serbian painter and his Aromanian assistant. The imposing candelabra dates to 1784, and two candleholders to 1850.

A surrounding wall was begun in 1847, continued in 1866 and completed in 1896. The churchyard contains several stone crosses for the Aromanians who contributed to the church. Another stone cross, carved with symbolic motifs, stands near the wall. The church is listed as a historic monument by Romania's Ministry of Culture and Religious Affairs.
