= Lizartza =

Town in Gipuzkoa, Spain

Coordinates: 43°06′13″N 2°2′3″W

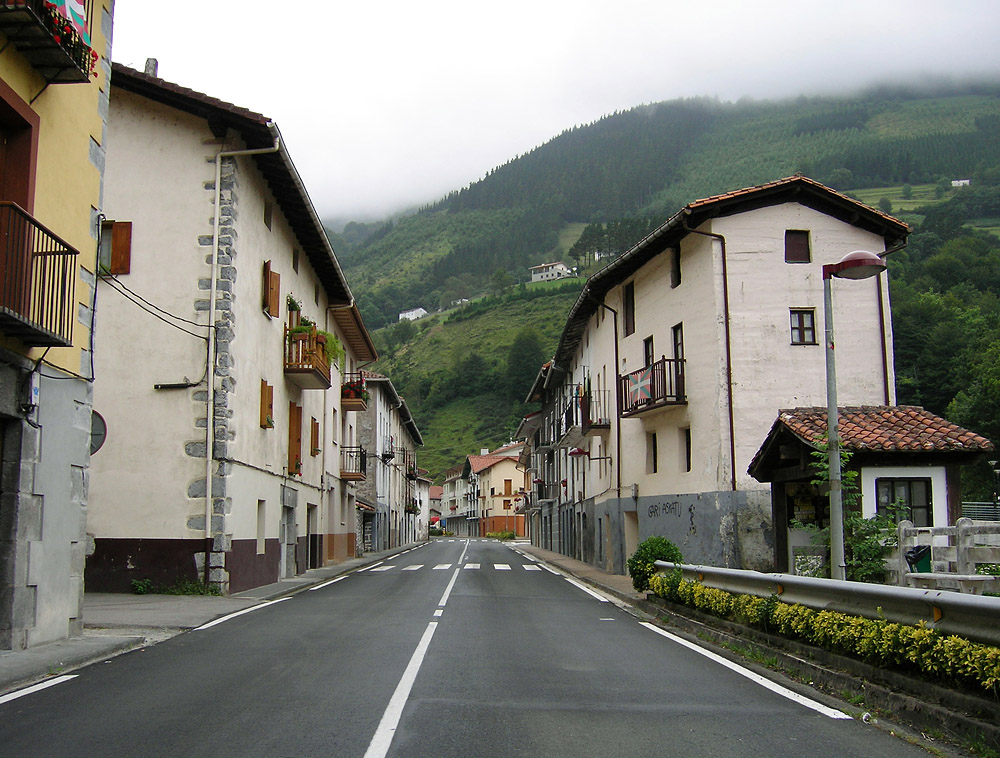
Street of Lizartza

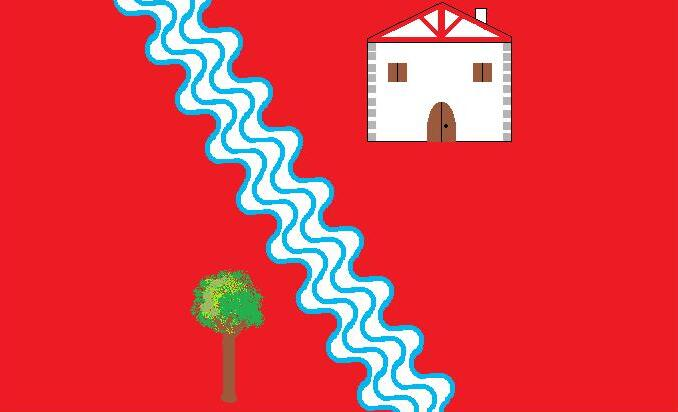
Lizartza's flag

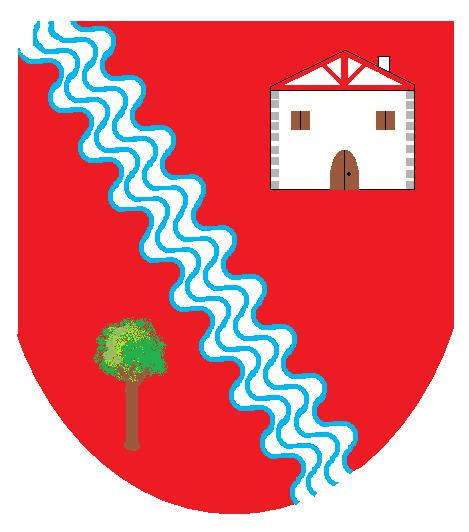
Lizartza's coat of arms

Lizartza is a town located in the province of Gipuzkoa, in the autonomous community of Basque Country, in the North of Spain.
