= Rule of the Theotokos =

Eastern Orthodox Christian prayer

The Rule of the Theotokos is a Christian prayer of the Eastern Orthodox that consists of reciting the Angelical salutation 150 times. This rule is similar to the Rosary of the Western Church.

Some believe that the Mother of God showed the Rule to people in the 8th century AD but was later forgotten, and was rediscovered for Eastern Christians by St Seraphim of Sarov.

The prayer consists of 150 Angelical salutations, which are divided into 15 decades. Each decade focuses on some important event in the life of the Jesus Christ and his virgin-mother. Seraphim Zvezdinsky describes the following structure of the rule:

1. Birth of the Theotokos
2. Presentation of the Theotokos
3. Annunciation
4. Visitation to Elisabeth
5. Birth of Christ
6. Meeting of the Lord
7. Flight into Egypt
8. Loss of Jesus in the Temple of Jerusalem
9. Miracle in Cana of Galilee
10. Theotokos standing by the Cross
11. Resurrection of Christ
12. Ascension of Christ
13. Descent of the Holy Spirit
14. Dormition of the Theotokos
15. Glory of the Theotokos

The rule of the Theotokos, as prayed today, in addition to Angelic salutations usually includes also some other prayers. Thus usually some corresponding church hymn (e.g. troparion) is added to each decade. Also some introductory and closing prayers are included.
