= Dormition Church, Sopik =

Cultural monument of Albania

Dormition Church
- Kisha Fjetja e Shën Mërisë (Albanian)
- Interactive map of Dormition Church
- Location: Sopik

Cultural Monument of Albania

The Dormition Church (Albanian: Kisha Fjetja e Shën Mërisë) is an Orthodox church in the village Sopik near Gjirokastër, Albania, dedicated to the Dormition of the Theotokos. It is a Cultural Monument of Albania since 1963.
