= Assumption – St. Paul =

Roman Catholic parish in Staten Island, New York, USA

Coordinates: 40°38′7.86″N 74°5′21.59″W

Assumption – St. Paul is a Roman Catholic parish in New Brighton, Staten Island, New York, United States. The parish was formed by the merger in 2007 of Church of the Assumption and St. Paul's Church.

== Assumption Church ==
The parish of the Church of the Assumption grew out of a mission chapel established after World War I on Webster Avenue for Italian Catholics in the area by Rev. Louis Riccio, pastor of Our Lady of Mt. Carmel parish in West New Brighton. Rev. Carmelo Crisci was appointed by Patrick Cardinal Hayes to be the first pastor of Assumption Parish in New Brighton. The church, designed in Italian Renaissance style was dedicated on the Feast of the Assumption, August 15, 1922. Above the Webster Avenue entrance are six decorative terra cotta tiles depicting Joseph with the Child Jesus, the Lamb of God, and the four evangelists. The parish school was dedicated in September 1962. In 2007, the Archdiocese of New York merged Assumption Church with the Chapel of Saint Paul.

== St. Paul's Chapel ==
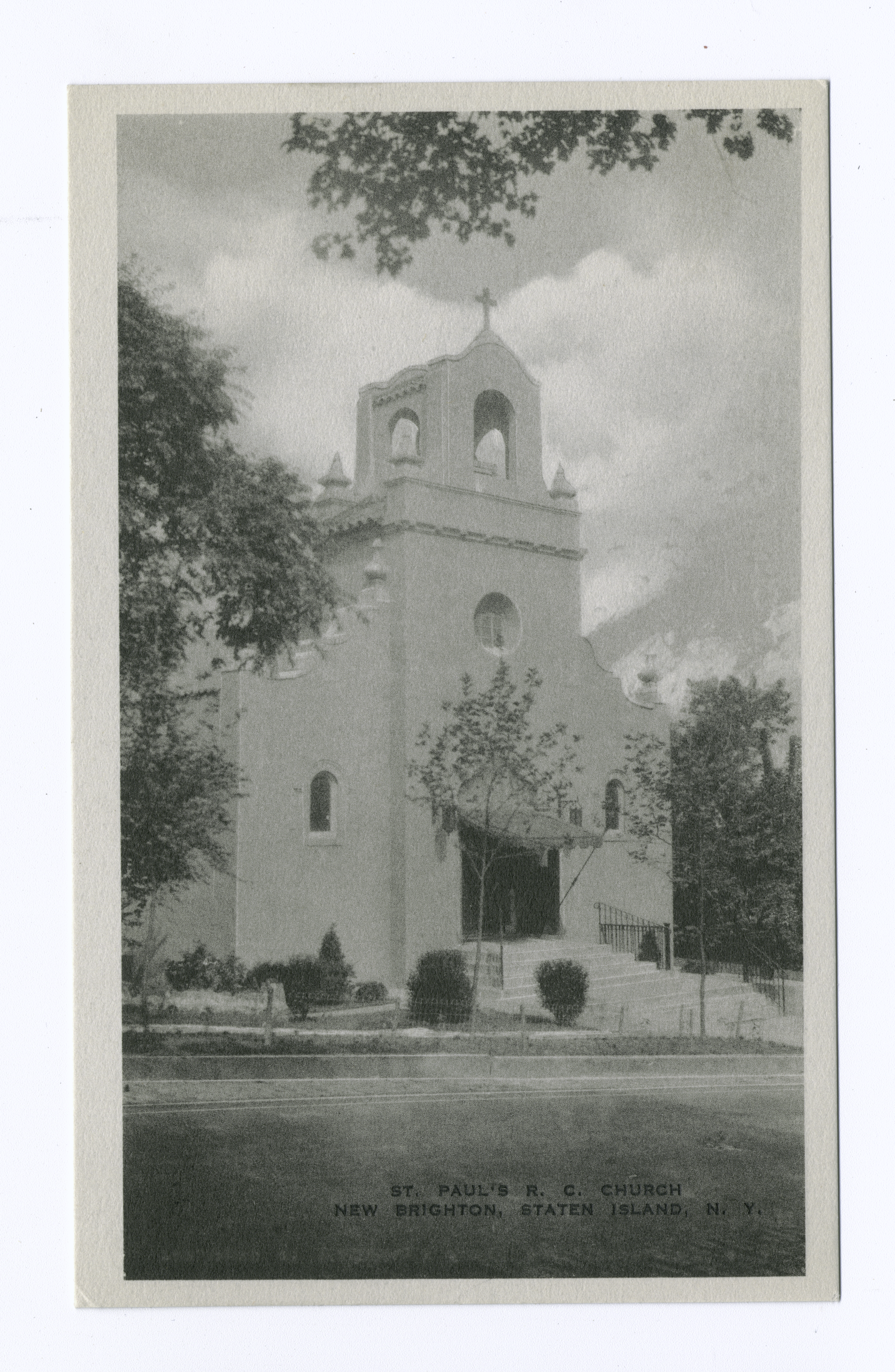
St. Paul's, early 20th century

St. Paul's was originally a chapel of St. Peter's Parish. St. Paul's Church opened in 1923 on Franklin Avenue, it was built in the style of a Spanish mission. A school was opened in the 1930s. In 1963, old St. Paul's Church was demolished and services were then held in the gymnasium/auditorium of St. Paul's School on Clinton Avenue. In 2007, St. Paul's merged with Assumption parish.
