= Assumption of the Blessed Virgin Mary Church =

Historic church in Michigan, United States

- Assumption of the Blessed Virgin Mary Church Complex
- U.S. National Register of Historic Places
- U.S. Historic district
- Michigan State Historic Site
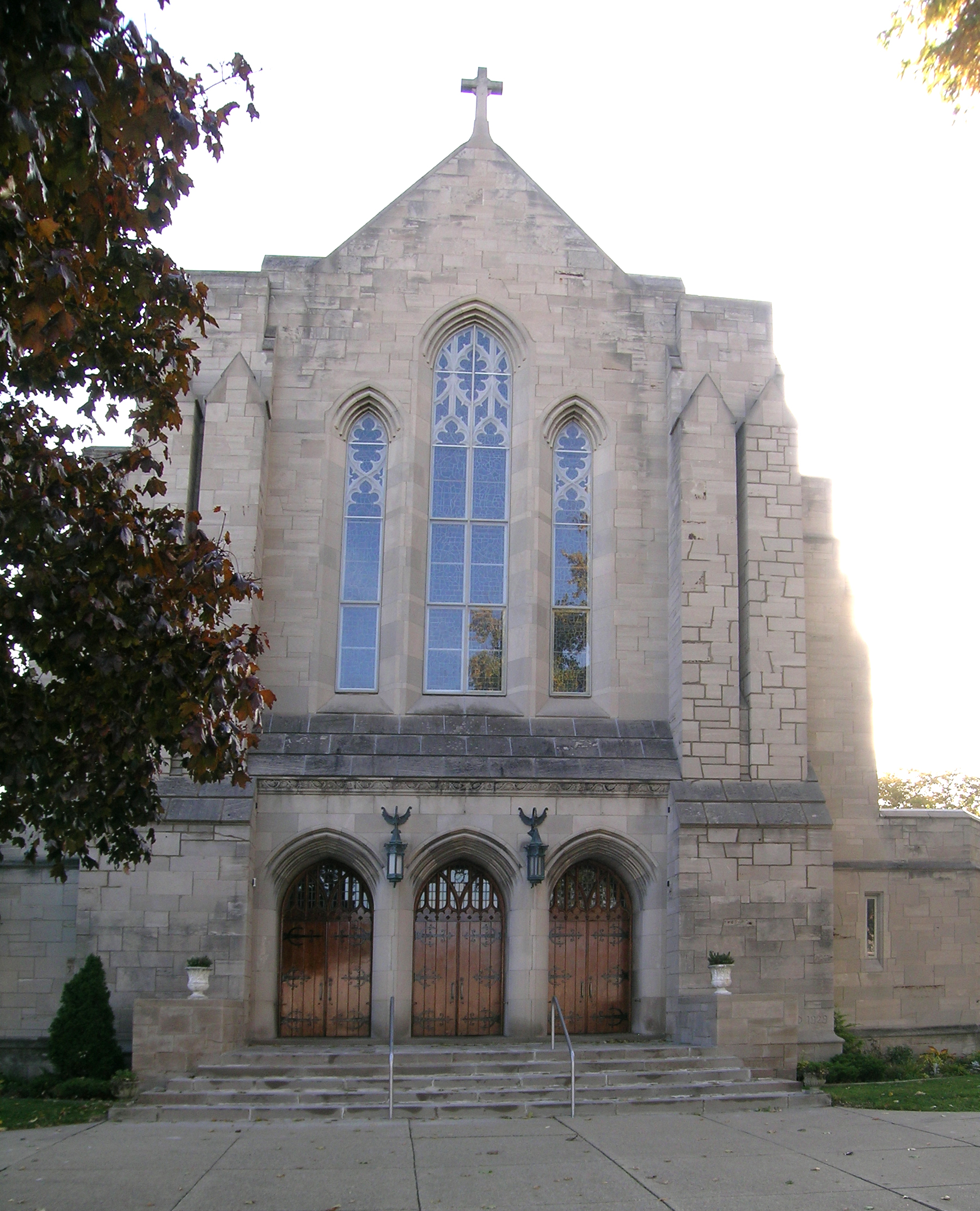
- Interactive map
- Location: 13770 Gratiot Avenue; Detroit, Michigan
- Coordinates: 42°25′40″N 82°58′52″W
- Built: 1929
- Architect: Peter Dederichs Et al.
- Architectural style: Late Gothic Revival, Renaissance
- NRHP reference No.: 91001020

Significant dates
- Added to NRHP: August 5, 1991
- Designated MSHS: July 19, 1990

The Assumption of the Blessed Virgin Mary Church is a Catholic church of the Archdiocese of Detroit located at 13770 Gratiot Avenue in Detroit, Michigan. It is commonly known as the Assumption Grotto Church. The church community was founded in the 1830s, and the present building completed in 1929, designated a Michigan State Historic Site in 1990 and listed on the National Register of Historic Places in 1991.

== Architecture ==
The Assumption of the Blessed Virgin Mary Church Complex consists of multiple structures: the church, a convent, a rectory, a cemetery, and the grotto, along with a utilitarian boiler house.

The church is a basilica-plan Neo-Gothic structure, faced with limestone and occupies the middle of the property facing Gratiot Avenue. The interior of the church includes altars and communion rails of Italian marble and stained glass windows illustrating scenes from the life of the Virgin Mary and the saints.

The rectory dates to 1918 and lies to the south of the church with the convent to the north dating from the early 1920s. Both are constructed of red brick along with the modest boiler house located next to the convent. A parish cemetery with a variety of monuments spanning from the early 19th century to the present lies east, to the rear of the church. A large statue of Our Lady of Lourdes stands on the grounds facing Gratiot.

Near the rear of the cemetery is the grotto. The shrine is constructed from imported limestone, and was completed in 1881. Boulders placed around the shrine (as well as in the cemetery) were carried by farmers from all parts of Michigan. Some of the stones and many of the limestone pieces are carved with names and dedications.

== History ==
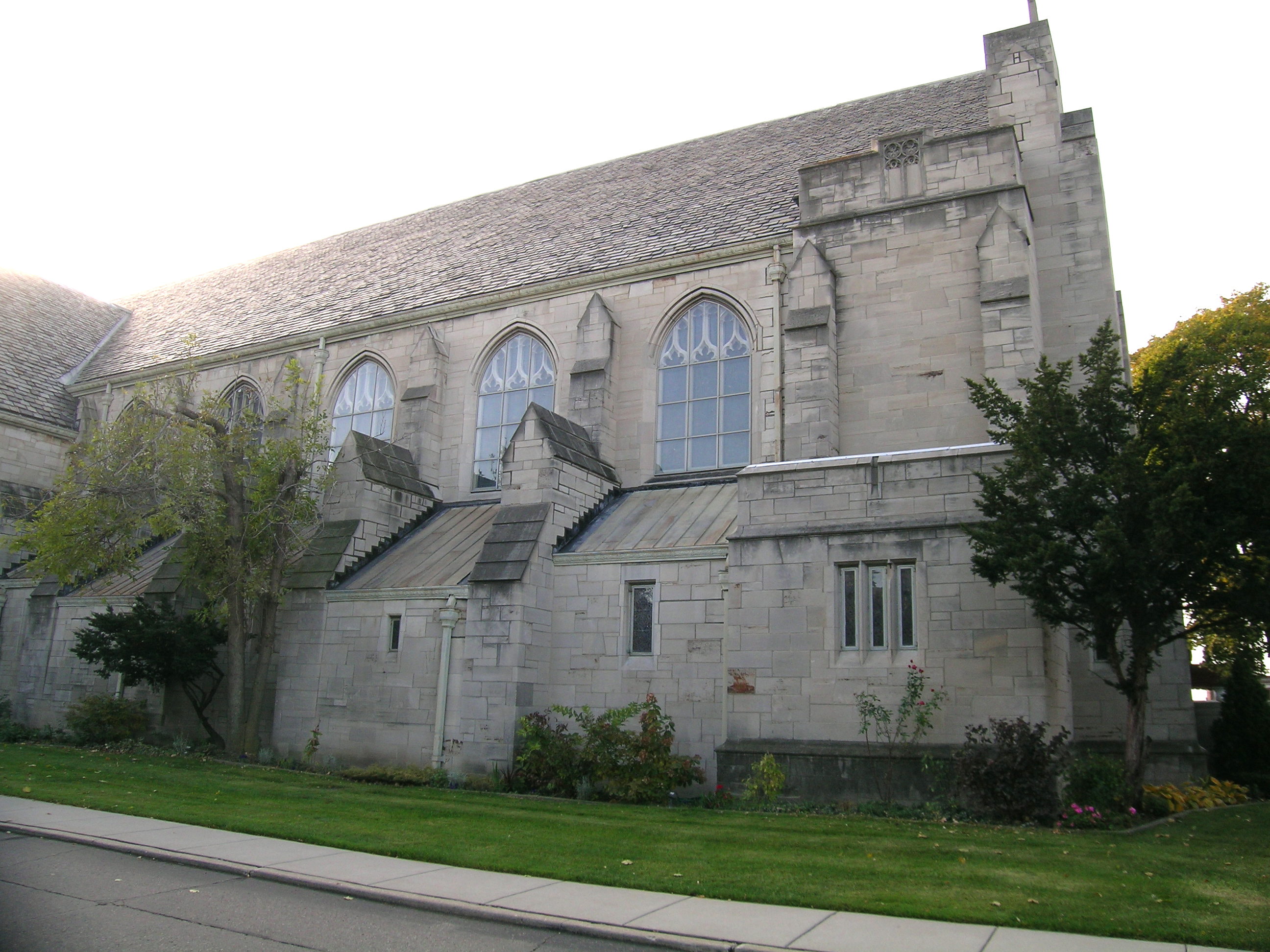
Side elevation of church

When German immigrants first came to Detroit in 1830, they arrived in the middle of a cholera epidemic. Avoiding the city, they traveled north along Gratiot, settling among a handful of French Roman Catholics families that were descendants of the earliest trappers and pioneers.

John and Catherine Greiner established a small settlement named Conner Creek and built a log church at the site where this church now stands. They called the building Kirchen Wald (Church in the Woods), and Redemptionist missionaries offered Roman Catholic services in the structure. The name was later changed to "Chapel of the Assumption" and later "St. Mary's in the Woods" before being designated the "Assumption of the Blessed Virgin Mary Church."

In 1847, Assumption of the Blessed Virgin Mary Church was designated a parish—only the second in what is now Detroit. In 1852, the first full-time pastor, Father Amandus Van Den Driessche from Flanders, Belgium, was assigned to the church. He began building a permanent brick structure, which was completed by the end of 1852 and sat 500. In 1876, Vandendriessche visited France, and was so impressed by the Sanctuary of Our Lady of Lourdes that he had a replica of the grotto, designed by Peter Dederichs, created at the church. The grotto was completed in 1881. On April 30, 1882, Pope Leo XIII signed a proclamation granting partial and plenary indulgences for anyone who visited the Grotto and prayed for the propagation of the faith.

As Detroit grew in the early 20th century, so did the parish. When the 1852 church burned, construction began on a third church in 1907. However, the population continued to grow. To meet the needs of the larger congregation, the Detroit architect Aloys Frank Herman (in a solo work apart from his longterm partnership Herman and Simons) designed the current church that was built in 1928-1929, and dedicated on September 22, 1929.

Due to the shrine, the Church of the Assumption began to be known as Assumption Grotto.

== See also ==
- Roman Catholic Archdiocese of Detroit
