= Dormition of the Theotokos Church, Sighetu Marmației =

Heritage site in Maramureș County, Romania

Coordinates: 47°55′45″N 23°53′36″E

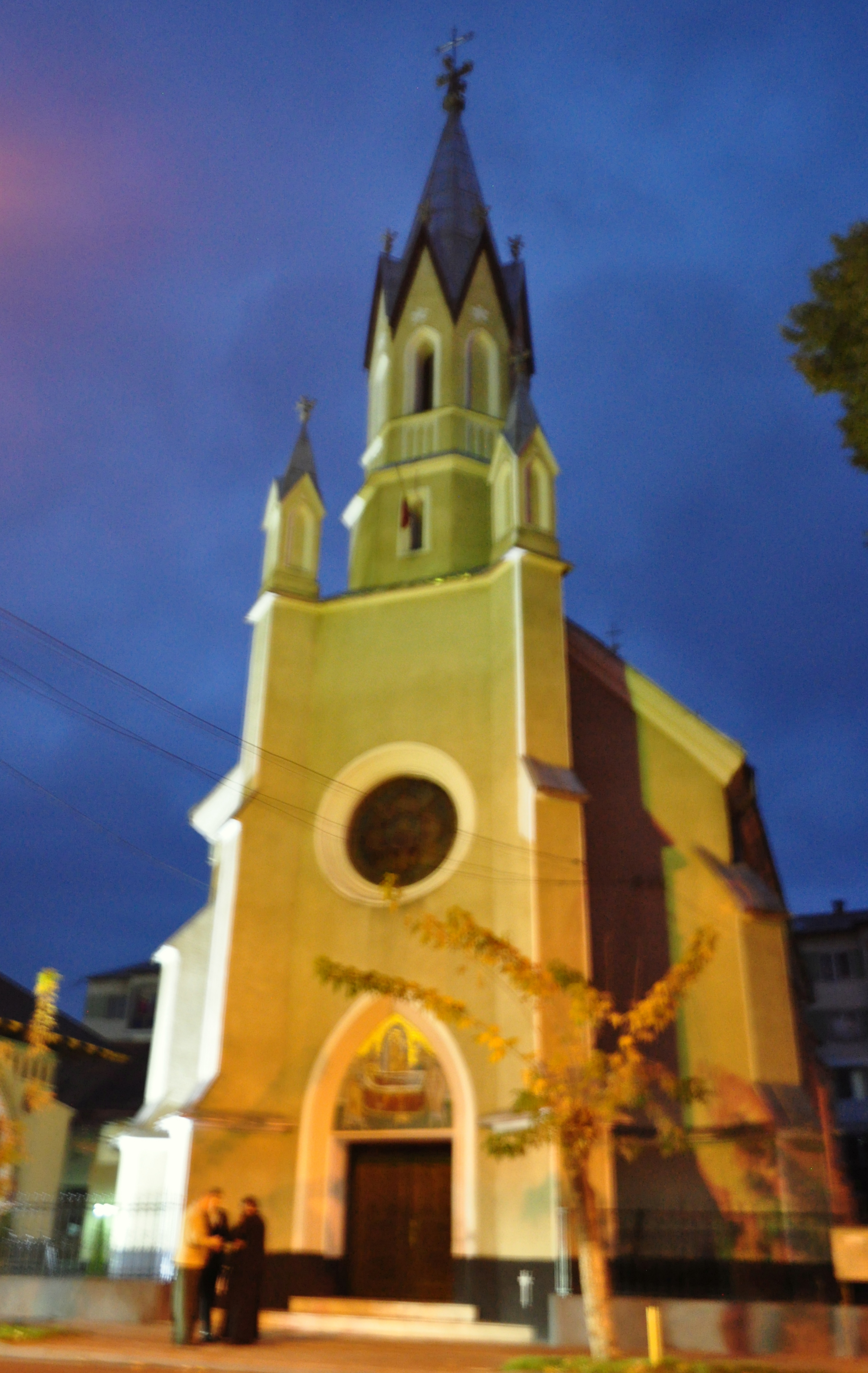
Dormition of the Theotokos Church

The Dormition of the Theotokos Church (Romanian: Biserica Adormirea Maicii Domnului) is a Romanian Orthodox church located at 3 Dragoș Vodă Street, Sighetu Marmației, Romania. It is dedicated to the Dormition of the Theotokos.

Construction of the church began in 1890 and was completed in 1892; it was dedicated to the Dormition of the Most Pure Virgin Mary the same year. The church was built by the Romanian Greek-Catholic Church, remaining in its possession until 1948, when the new communist regime outlawed the denomination. Tit Bud was parish priest from 1897 until his death in 1917.

The style is Gothic Revival, accurately reproducing the characteristic pointed arches, buttresses, withdrawn portal and wooden tracery. It is a hall church, with a detached polygonal altar. The ceiling is vaulted, supported by columns with capitals. The spire begins as a square, becoming octagonal halfway up. There is a mosaic icon of the Dormition above the entrance. The lower interior was painted in fresco in 1930–1931; the upper part in oil in 1933. The church was restored in 2003–2008.

The church is listed as a historic monument by Romania's Ministry of Culture and Religious Affairs, as is the contemporaneous parish house.
