= Assumption Junior College =

- 聖母被昇天学院女子短期大学
- Type: Junior college
- Active: 1967–2005
- Academic staff: English; Psychology
- Students: About 280
- Location: Minoh, Osaka, Japan

Assumption Junior College (聖母被昇天学院女子短期大学, Seibo Hishōten Gakuin Joshi Tanki Daigaku) was a junior college in Minoh, Osaka, Japan. It was founded in 1967, and closed in 2005.
