= Donie O'Sullivan =

Donie O'Sullivan may refer to:

- Donie O'Sullivan (Gaelic footballer), Gaelic footballer from County Kerry, Ireland
- Donie O'Sullivan (journalist), CNN journalist from County Kerry, Ireland
