= Dormition of the Theotokos Church, Constanța =

Orthodox church in Constanța, Romania

Coordinates: 44°10′45″N 28°38′51″E

The Dormition of the Theotokos Church (Romanian: Biserica Adormirea Maicii Domnului) is a Romanian Orthodox church located at 18 Ion Lahovary Street, Constanța, Romania. It is dedicated to the Dormition of the Theotokos.

The building is the city's second-oldest Romanian church, after what is now the cathedral. It was constructed for residents of a new neighborhood that extended beyond the historic limits of the city. Bishop Pimen Georgescu approved the project in 1906, and the church was consecrated in 1911.

The church is listed as a historic monument by Romania's Ministry of Culture and Religious Affairs.
