= Assumption (short story) =

Samuel Beckett's first published story

"Assumption" is Samuel Beckett's first published story, appearing in Transition magazine in June 1929, in the same issue as James Joyce's Work in Progress.
