= Dormition Church, Dubiny =

Orthodox church in Poland

Coordinates: 52.7776°N 23.5917°E

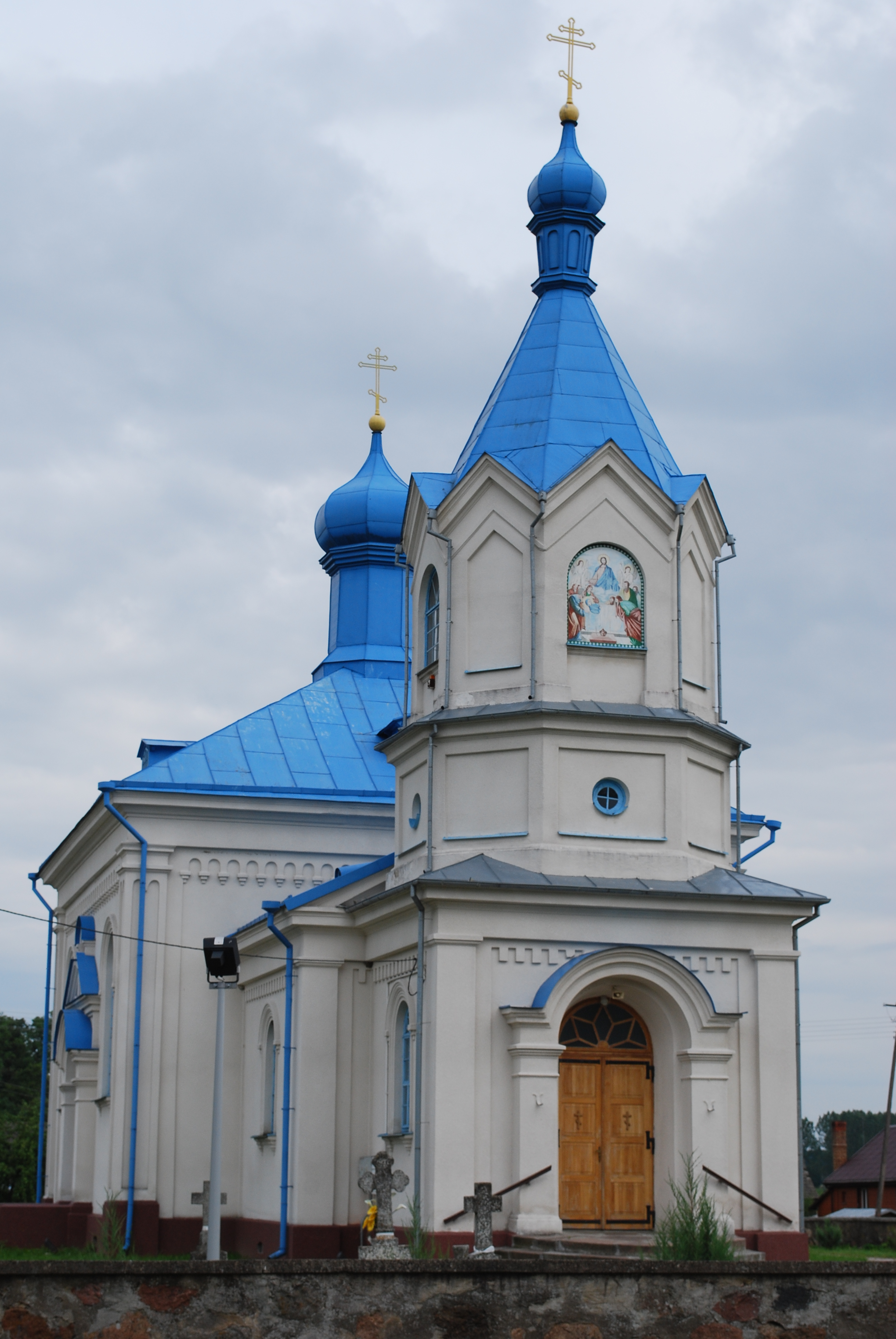
Dubiny Orthodox church, modern view

Dormition of the Mother of God Orthodox Church in Dubiny, Poland, is a parish Orthodox church. It belongs to Hajnówka deanery in the Warszawa-Bielsko diocese of the Polish Autocephalous Orthodox Church. The temple is located on Szkolna street.

== History ==
The church was built in 1872 on a plot gifted by Klimański, a local landowner. It replaced the old 18th century wooden church, which was dismantled and moved to Rogacz. Construction began on 15 August 1867 and was completed on 23 November 1872, when the church was blessed. The oak iconostasis was funded by the parish priest – Parteniusz Bazylewski. In 1900, a stone fence was erected around the building. After World War II, icons at the church were adorned by richly decorated frames, made by Michał Ochrymiuk, a local artist.

On 9 December 2011 the church was entered into the Polish Registry of Cultural Heritage under A-369.

== Celebrations of the Dormition of the Mother of God holiday in Dubiny ==
Due to the church's dedication, the Dormition of the Mother of God is an especially important date and has been enhanced with local traditions, such as the blessing of harvest and herbs.

=== Fast ===
Video recording of the Dormition celebrations in Dubiny, 2015

Two weeks of fasting precede the event. During that time, the faithful should not eat meat, dairy products or eggs, but are allowed to eat fish. Different sources present various examples of the fast. According to some, fish can be eaten on any day except Wednesday and Friday, since these days commemorate, respectively, Judas' betrayal and the Crucifixion. Other sources claim that Mondays should be also observed as fasting days, as that day of the week is dedicated to the Angels.

=== Evening prayers and displaying the Epitaphios ===
On 27 August, evening prayers are held in the church and on the next day the Akathist of the Dormition of the Mother of God is sung, followed by the Liturgy. During the evening prayers a procession takes place and the Epitaphios (a cloth icon depicting the Mother of God) is displayed.

The Dubiny tradition differs from the Jerusalem standard, which has the Epitaphios presented at the beginning of morning prayers. The icon cloth is placed on the grave of the Mother of God, located in the church's centre. Next, priests read out verses about the Mother of God falling asleep and her departure, as well as explain the meaning and significance of the holiday. After that, four women carry the Epitaphios out of the church and a procession symbolising the journey of the dead Mother of God to her grave circles the temple. The procession is led by local men carrying standards and pennants depicting saints. They are followed by the women with the Epitaphios, while the parish priest walks underneath – it is a local custom (in Jerusalem, the holy icon is taken off the Epitaphios and carried on by the Patriarch; in Dubiny, the parish priest is unable to carry the heavy cloth on his own, so the Epitaphios is stretched over his head by the women). The priest walking underneath the cloth always carries a bible. The rest of the faithful follow them in a procession. The church's bells ring throughout the whole ceremony.

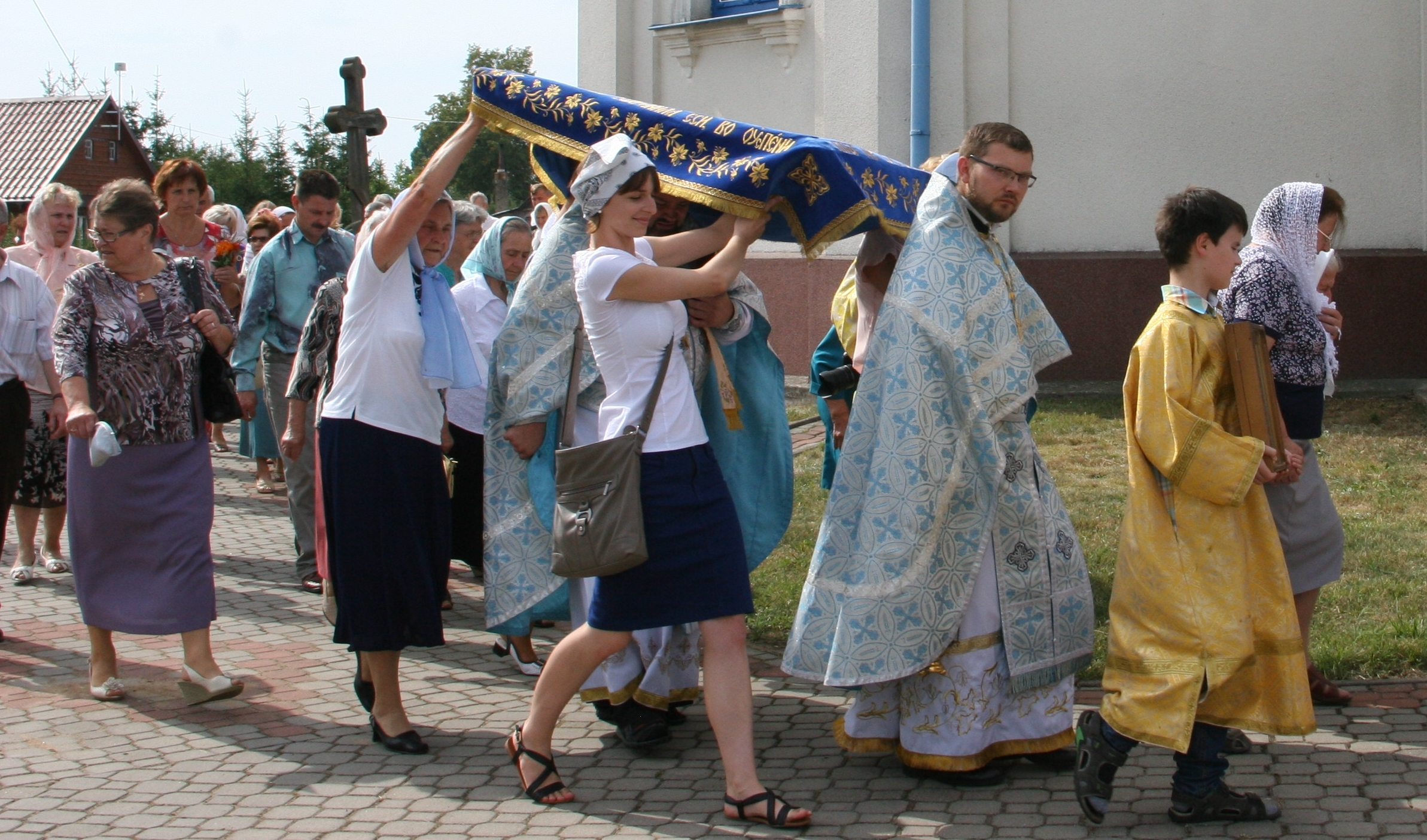
The elderly women carrying the cloth during the celebrations

After circling the church three times, the procession returns inside and the next ritual takes place: the faithful walk under the Epitaphios. According to the tradition, walking under a pall (either Mother of God's or Christ's) brings divine grace. Finally, the evening prayers end with the adoration of the Epitaphios, which is placed on the Mother of God's grave and the congregation can walk up to it and kiss Mary's depiction. Afterwards, the parish priest anoints them with blessed oil. In Orthodox tradition the Sacrament of Anointment is a healing rite, it helps to treat body, mind and soul and as such can be administered to anyone in need. In some Orthodox churches the bishop administers the sacrament to anyone who attended the morning prayers and Holy Thursday celebrations.

=== Morning Prayers ===
On 28 August, early in the morning, the celebration of the Akathist of the Dormition of the Mother of God and the Liturgy take place. During the Liturgy the priests may also preach about the Dormition. These sermons may also take the form of cautionary advice, which explains the moral issues the holiday touches upon, for example the nature of death and human relation to it.

During the morning prayers and the Liturgy, another local Dubiny tradition takes place: two rows of elderly women, holding lit blessed candles, stand before the altar. This custom can be observed during each of the 12 important Orthodox holidays. The candles are handmade by the women and lighting them on a holiday is considered a unique form of prayer.

=== Blessing of Harvest and Herbs ===
Blessing of Harvest and Herbs during morning prayers is a local Dubiny tradition. The faithful bring bunches of herbs and flowers that symbolize the year's harvest. The bunches are made from various plants, depending on the season and availability of certain herbs. Typically, they include ears of wheat and rye, flowers, herbs and vegetables. During the blessing priests say a prayer that infuses the herbs with the power of protecting from evil. They are also used for incensing – a person thus cleansed may participate in the sacraments of Reconciliation and Holy Communion. Blessed herbs, such as Easter palms, are burnt after a year.
