= Lipoveni Church =

Heritage site in Alba County, Romania

Coordinates: 46°04′32″N 23°35′16″E

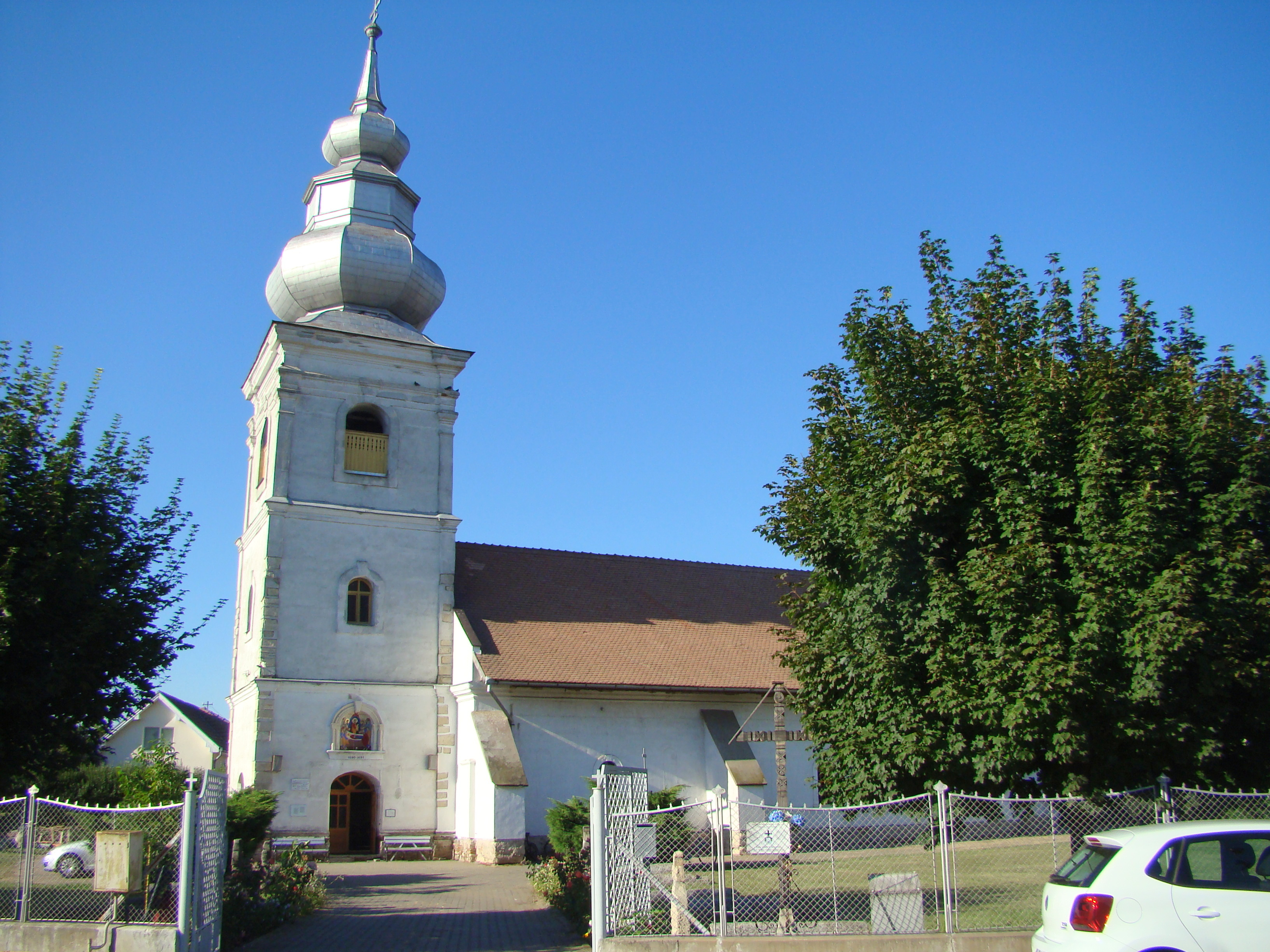
Lipoveni Church

The Lipoveni Church is a Romanian Orthodox church located at 17 Mărășești Street, Alba Iulia, Romania. It is dedicated to the Dormition of the Theotokos.

The church takes its name from Lipoveni, a neighborhood in the northern part of the city. This in turn was named after Lipova, home of the Romanian workers who were building the Alba Carolina Fortress. Tradition holds that they built the church.

An inscription above the door indicates a construction date of 1690–1691. However, as the church does not appear on a detailed map of 1711, but only starts to be depicted in 1752, it appears to have been built within that interval. The principal ktetor was Ioan Dragoș de Thurna, who was ennobled by Maria Theresa in 1742, and whose name and arms appear on silver candleholders of 1736 and 1766. A construction date of 1720 has been suggested, as well as 1736, based on the candleholder.

Between 1759 and 1761, the church was subject to clashes between Orthodox and Romanian Greek-Catholics, causing damage that required major repairs. In 1761, Sofronie of Cioara, shortly before fleeing to Wallachia, held a synod of Transylvanian Orthodox in the church. Subsequently, the walls were raised, the ceilings rebuilt, the nave and vestibule joined, buttresses and a massive spire added, in 1763. An inscription notes that the original altar was replaced in 1827.

Fragments of the original painting were discovered during repairs in 1922. The interior painting dates to 1957–1958, as does the iconostasis. Somewhat unusually for churches of the period, the exterior features a painting. The window frames are decorated with floral and leaf motifs. From the time of Sofronie's departure until 1948, the building belonged to the Romanian Greek-Catholic Church, outlawed that year by the new communist regime. The churchyard contains 18th-century funerary stones, inscribed in Cyrillic.

The church is listed as a historic monument by Romania's Ministry of Culture and Religious Affairs.
