= Academy of the Assumption =

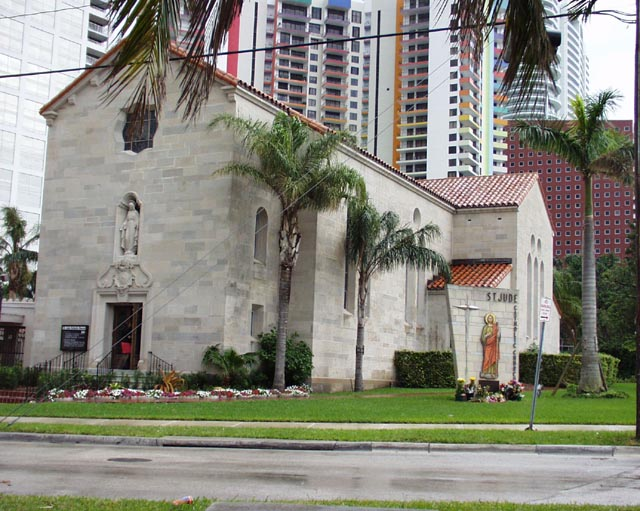
- Old Assumption Chapel, now St. Jude Melkite Catholic Church built in 1946 of Indiana Bedford stone
- Miami, Miami-Dade County, Florida; United States

Information
- Funding type: Private school
- Religious affiliation: Catholic
- Founded: 1943
- Closed: 1976
- Principal: Therese Margaret Duross
- Gender: Girls

Academy of the Assumption was a Catholic all-girls school that was located on Biscayne Bay in Miami, Florida, United States.

Built in 1943 and closed in 1976, it was run by the Religious of the Assumption. The school's last principal was Sr. Therese Margaret Duross R.A. After being closed, the facilities were sold. Most buildings have since been demolished, replaced by luxury high-rise condominiums that dot the area's skyline. However, some buildings are still standing and in use. The Assumption Chapel remains active, now a part of St. Jude Melkite Catholic Church.

== Notable alumni ==
- Cristina Saralegui '66

== Sources ==
- The Miami News, Liquidation Sale Clears Out Academy Of The Assumption by Eliott Rodriguez, July 17, 1978, Page 4A.
- The Miami News, Condo To Tower 41 Stories, by Larry Birger, July 25, 1979, Page 1A
- The Miami Daily News, Chapel Cornerstone is Laid at Academy, May 3, 1946, Page 1B.
