= Cathedral of the Theotokos =

Cathedral of the Theotokos may refer to:

- Cathedral of the Nativity of the Theotokos (disambiguation), a list of cathedrals dedicated to the Nativity of the Mother of God
- Cathedral of the Dormition of the Theotokos (disambiguation), a list of cathedrals dedicated to the Dormition of the Mother of God

== See also ==
- Church of the Nativity of the Theotokos (disambiguation)
- Church of the Dormition of the Theotokos (disambiguation)
