= Assumption School (Saint Paul, Minnesota) =

- U.S. National Register of Historic Places
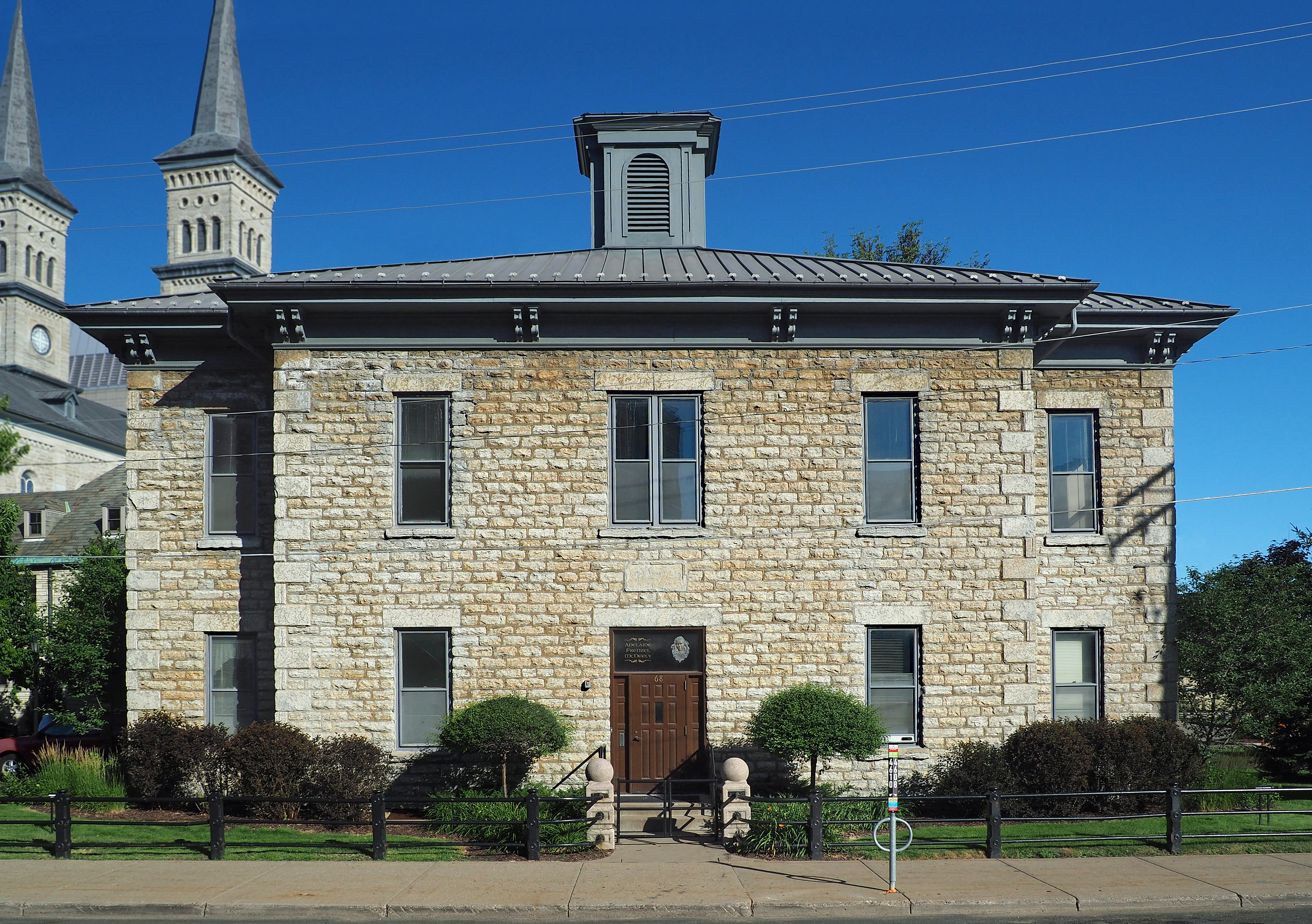
- Assumption School viewed from the northwest

- Location within Minnesota Location within the United States
- Location: 68 Exchange Street, Saint Paul, Minnesota
- Coordinates: 44°56′51″N 93°6′0″W
- Built: 1864
- Architectural style: Italianate
- NRHP reference No.: 75001005
- Added to NRHP: March 26, 1975

The Assumption School is a historic school building in Saint Paul in the U.S. state of Minnesota. It was built in 1864 of local quarter-cut limestone. It had a central cupola, which has been replaced. The school is affiliated with the nearby Church of the Assumption.

The building, in 1974, was "in a good state of preservation although it has not been used as a school since 1888. It presently serves as quarters for the parish caretaker and is maintained by the Assumption Church." The building has been documented by the Historic American Buildings Survey program.

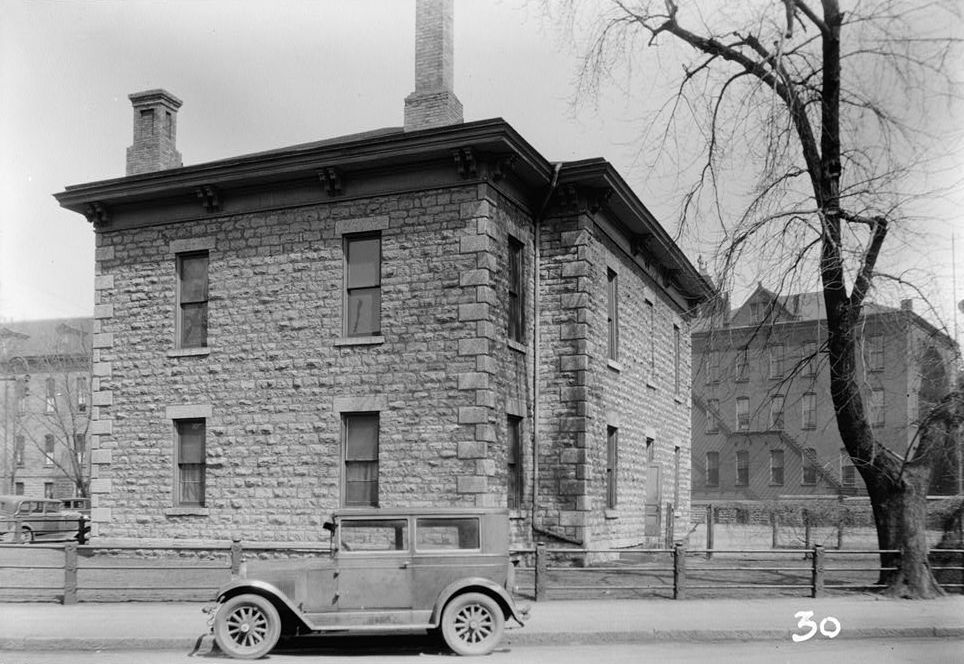
Assumption School in 1934
