= Dormition of the Theotokos Cathedral, Giurgiu =

Orthodox Christian Cathedral in Giurgiu County, Romania

Coordinates: 43.8918°N 25.9664°E

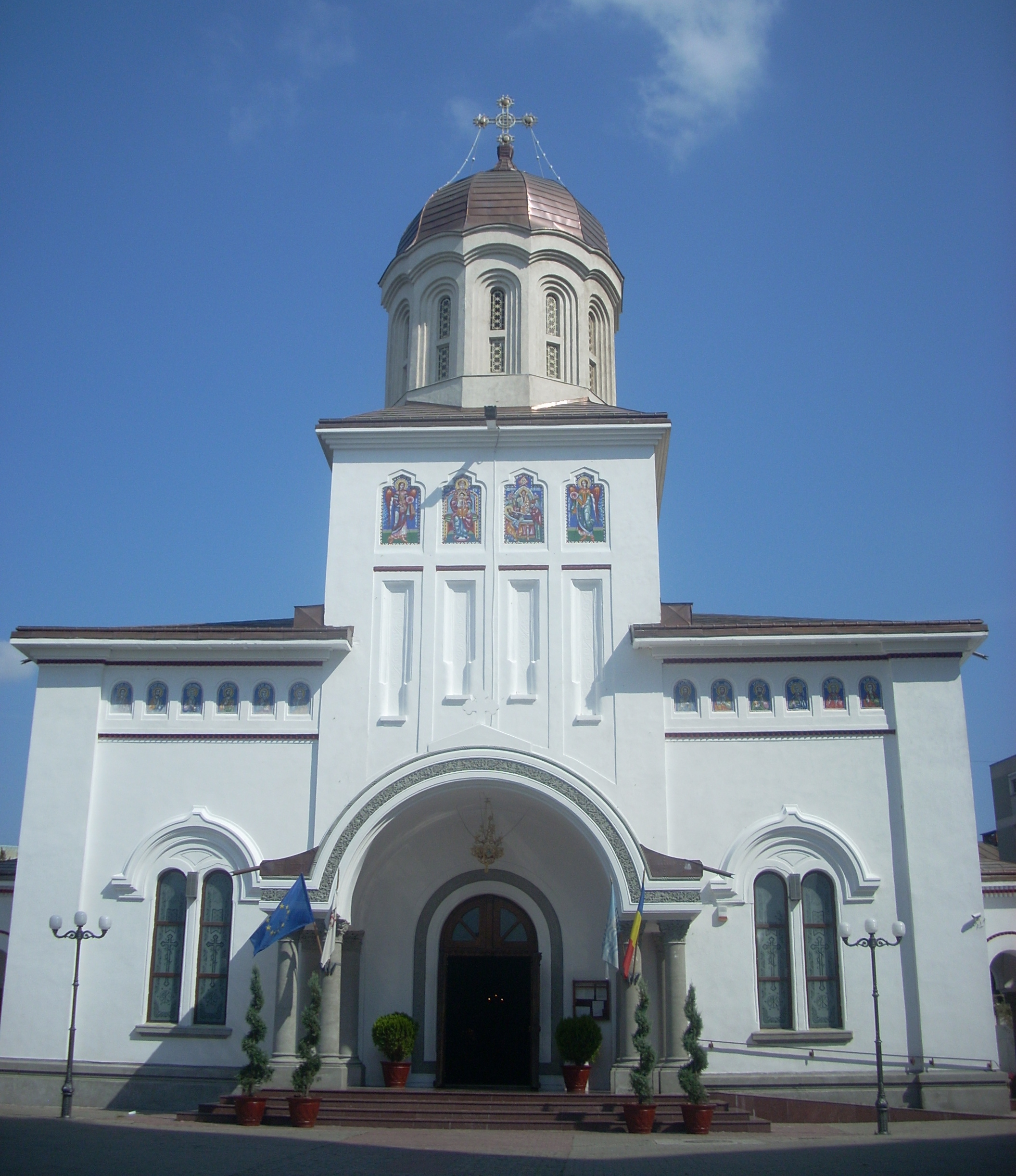
Giurgiu Cathedral

The Dormition of the Theotokos Cathedral, Giurgiu (Romanian: Catedrala Adormirea Maicii Domnului din Giurgiu), located at 12 București Street, Giurgiu, Romania, is the seat of the Romanian Orthodox Bishop of Giurgiu.

== History ==
=== Initial status and construction ===
The building was initially a parish church; an 1859 inscription (written in Romanian Cyrillic) indicates that a church bearing the same name was built underground on the site in 1806, as the Ottoman authorities would not allow churches to be built above ground. The present church was built from 1840 to 1852. It has a basilical plan, with spires above the nave and entrance, and is built of burnt brick with lime mortar on a stone foundation. These stones were taken from the walls of Giurgiu citadel, as noted in an 1832 document from General Kiselyov giving his approval.

=== Style and alterations ===
The cathedral is spacious, with Byzantine forms: straight lines and semicircular arches, thick walls, square pillars, large windows and spherical spires. Built in a style characteristic of its time, it underwent significant changes in the first half of the 20th century. The large door at the main entrance was replaced with the smaller one still in use. A new roof was installed, and two wooden spires were replaced with reinforced concrete ones. Two tympana were built on the north and south sides to the right of the back spire, as were the frieze and architrave beneath the cornice. In the interior, the choir balcony and ambon were replaced and a wood floor was laid in the sanctuary. A granite floor was placed in the nave and, in the vestibule, above the stone base. A furnace and radiators were installed.

Then repainting began, as the old murals were deteriorating. In 1930 the bell-tower was repaired and the parish house built. Today's exterior paintings are the work of a Bucharest architect and engineer who in 1935 built the market stalls in Giurgiu's central square and the Tribunal in Alei Park. The initial interior painting was done in oil, in the decadent style of Gheorghe Tattarescu, by the painter Nicolae Pitaru. The present murals, executed in thick tempera in a neo-Byzantine style, were done by the painter Nicolae Stoica from 1939–59 and restored from 1989-2005 by Ion Drejoi, a student of his. The Baroque iconostasis, dating to the 19th century, was painted in oil by Pitaru. Initially extending the length of the church, covering three apses and including a dozen large icons, it was reduced to its present dimensions in the summer of 1948.

=== Icons and relics ===
During its existence, the cathedral has had a valuable collection of property donated by believers from Romania and abroad. For instance, an icon featuring the Holy Trinity was donated by the widow of the Russian General Soimonov (killed at the Battle of Inkerman) in honour and for the souls of her husband and his fallen comrades. Professional choirs have sung there.

=== Cathedral status ===
Although not yet the seat of a bishop, the church was called a cathedral from early on. It is referred to as a cathedral in an 1856 letter from the Russian Consulate at Galați to the Wallachian Secretariat of State regarding the donation of General Soimonov's widow. A 1935 document by Patriarch Miron Cristea also calls it a cathedral. It officially became a cathedral on 9 April 2006, when Ambrozie Meleacă was enthroned as the first bishop of the new Giurgiu Diocese. At the time, he received from Greece a small box containing relics of Saint George; this was stolen the following year, while in 2008, the zinc roof was replaced with a copper one, the floors replaced and an entrance ramp installed.
