= Dormition of the Theotokos Cathedral, Satu Mare =

Romanian Orthodox cathedral in Satu Mare, Romania

Coordinates: 47°47′28″N 22°52′52″E

Dormition of the Theotokos Cathedral
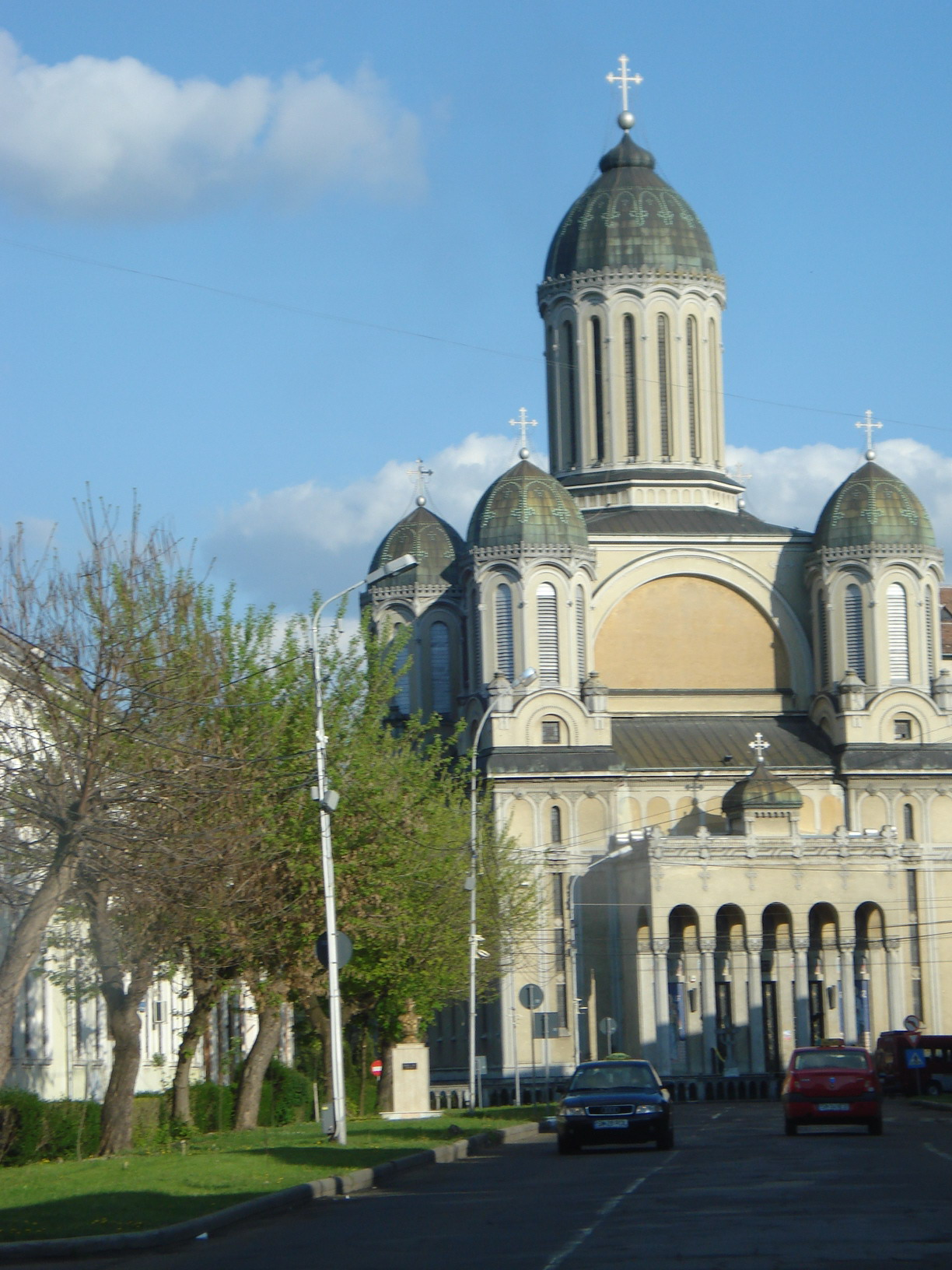
- Front view of the church

General information
- Location: Satu Mare, Romania
- Construction started: October 26, 1937
- Completed: late 1938

Design and construction
- Architect: Gheorghe Liteanu

The Dormition of the Theotokos Cathedral (Romanian: Biserica Ortodoxă Adormirea Maicii Domnului) is a Romanian Orthodox religious building in Satu Mare, Romania. Located on Dr. Vasile Lucaciu boulevard, it was originally built from the plans of the Romanian architect Gheorghe Liteanu, who was inspired by the Curtea de Argeș Cathedral. The cathedral has a length of 34.5 metres (113 ft), a width of 24.5 metres (80 ft), and a height of 55 metres (180 ft). As the seat of an archpriest and not a bishop, it is a church and not technically a cathedral, but is commonly referred to as such.

The cornerstone was laid in October 1937, and the roof was finished by late 1938. The first liturgy was held in July 1940.
