= St Mary's Greek Orthodox Church, Wood Green =

Church in North London, England

Coordinates: 51.601153°N 0.114655°W

St Mary's Greek Orthodox Church
- The Greek Orthodox Cathedral of the Dormition of the Mother of God
- St Mary's Cathedral
- St Mary's Greek Orthodox Church
- Location: Trinity Gardens, Wood Green
- Address: 22 Trinity Road, London N22 8LB
- Country: England
- Language: Greek
- Tradition: Greek Orthodox

History
- Status: Parish Church & Cathedral
- Dedication: To the Dormition of the Theotokos

Architecture
- Functional status: Active

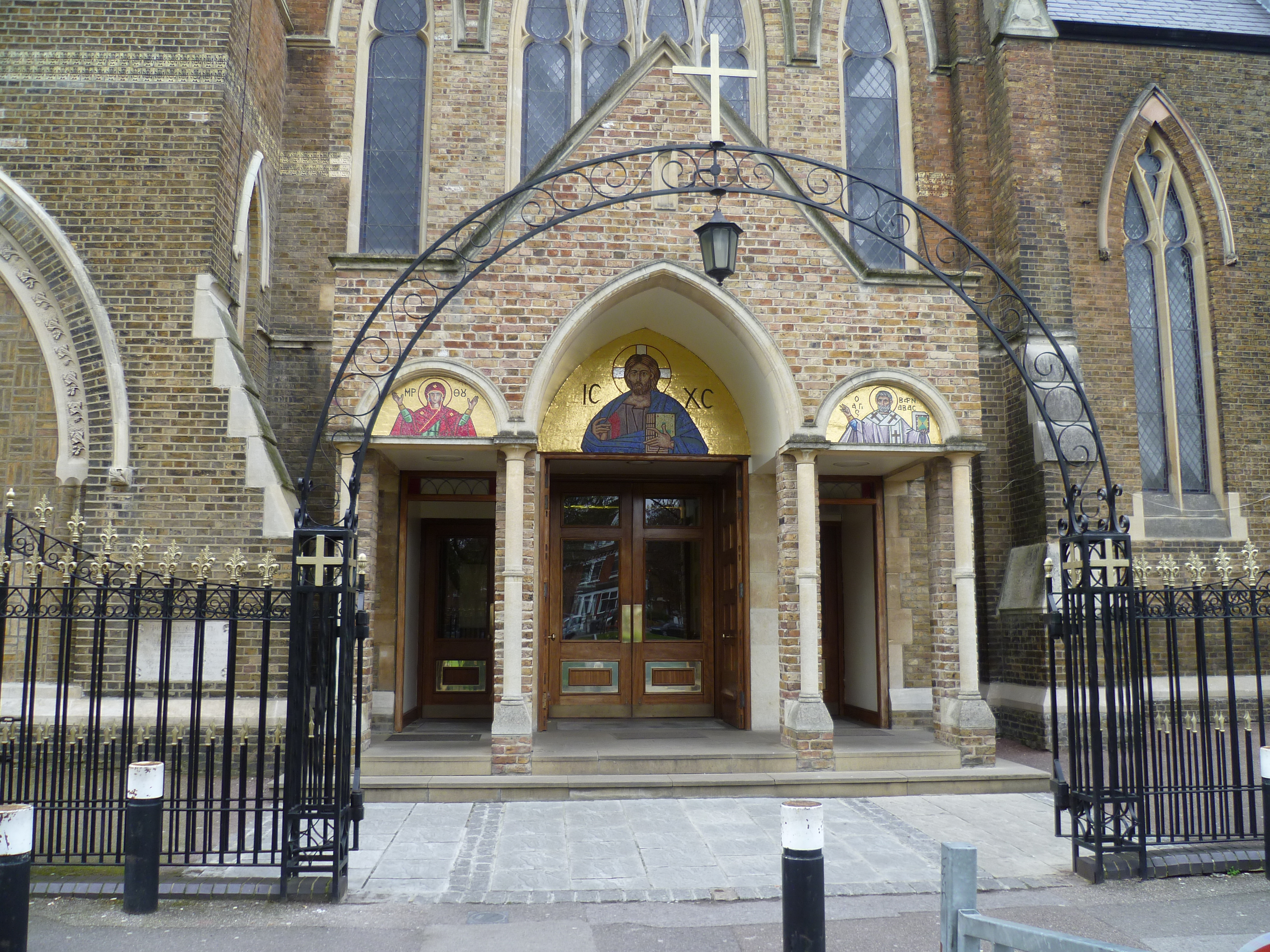
St Mary's Greek Orthodox Church

St Mary's Greek Orthodox Church is a Greek Orthodox church in Trinity Road, Wood Green, London. It is also sometimes known as St Mary's Cathedral or The Greek Orthodox Cathedral of the Dormition of the Mother of God.

== History ==
The church was built as Trinity Methodist Church in 1871 to the design of the reverend R.N. Johnson and became Greek Orthodox Church in 1970.

It was greatly rebuilt after a fire in 1986 with the help of the Greek community and fundraising events notably a Dinner & Dance arranged by a pupil of the Greek school Nick Efthymiou.

In 2012, the church has hosted the Greek Secondary School of London.

== See also ==
- Archdiocese of Thyateira and Great Britain
- Eastern Orthodoxy in the United Kingdom
- Greeks in the United Kingdom

== Gallery ==
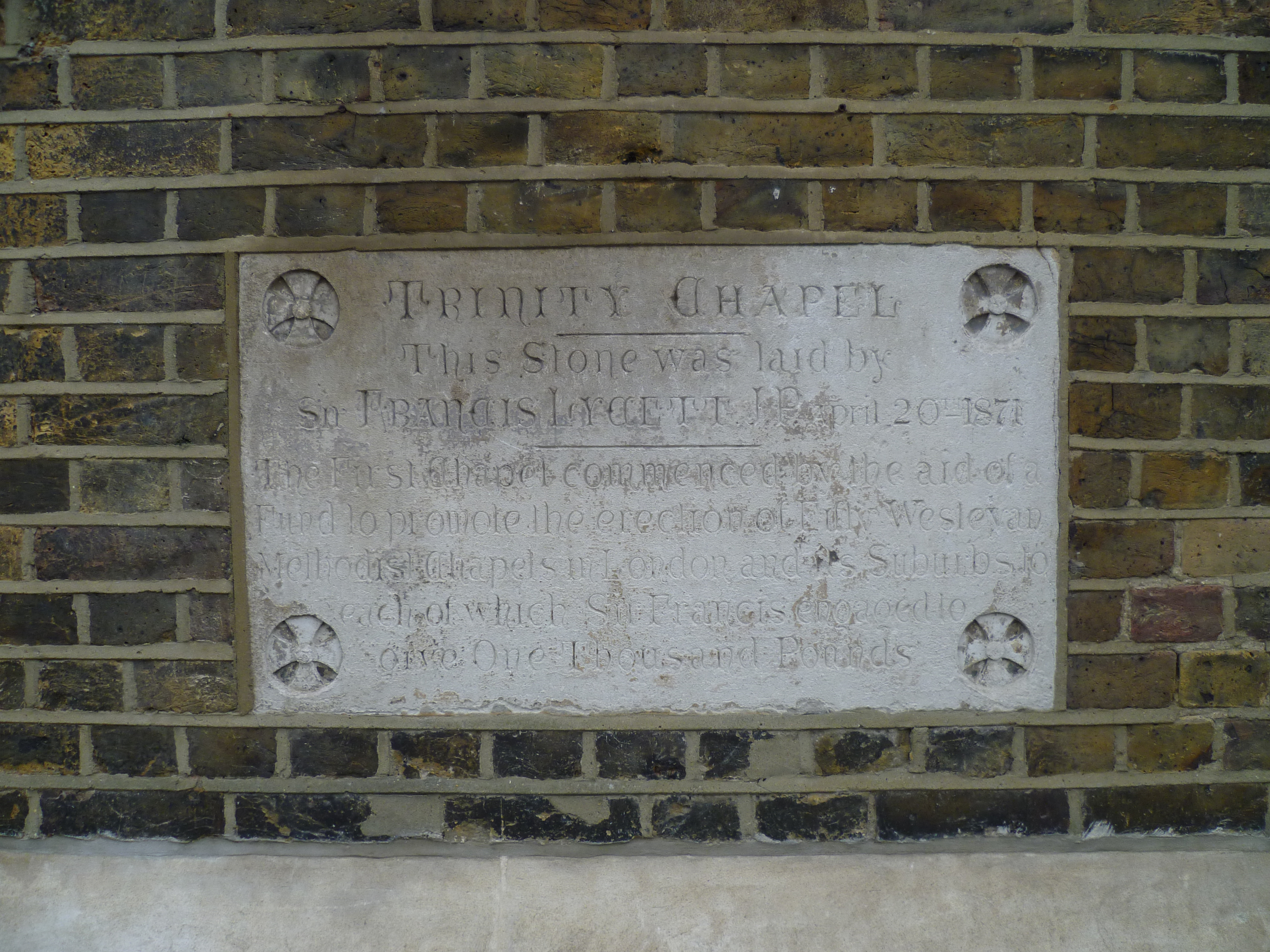
Foundation stone.

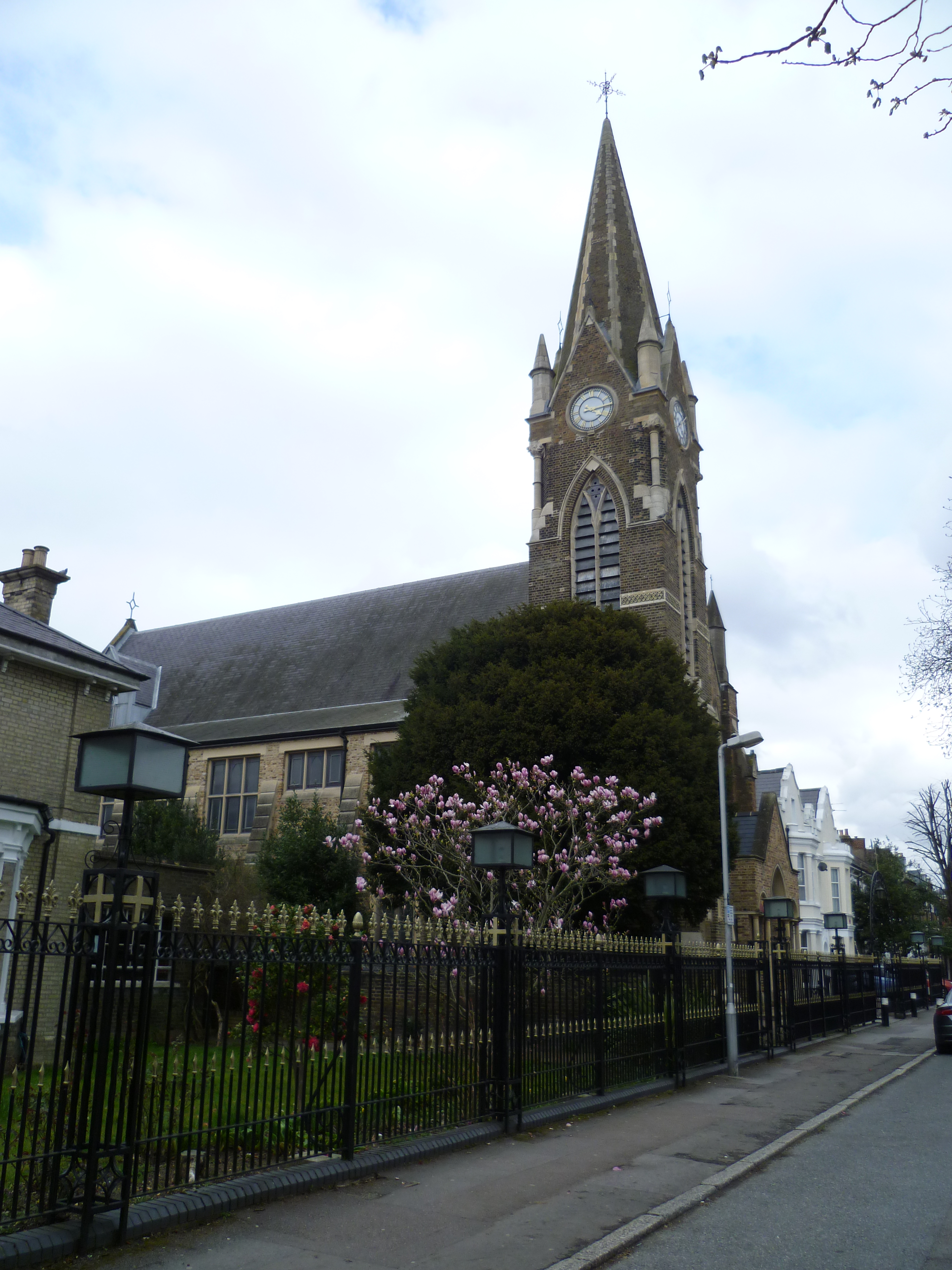
From Trinity Road.

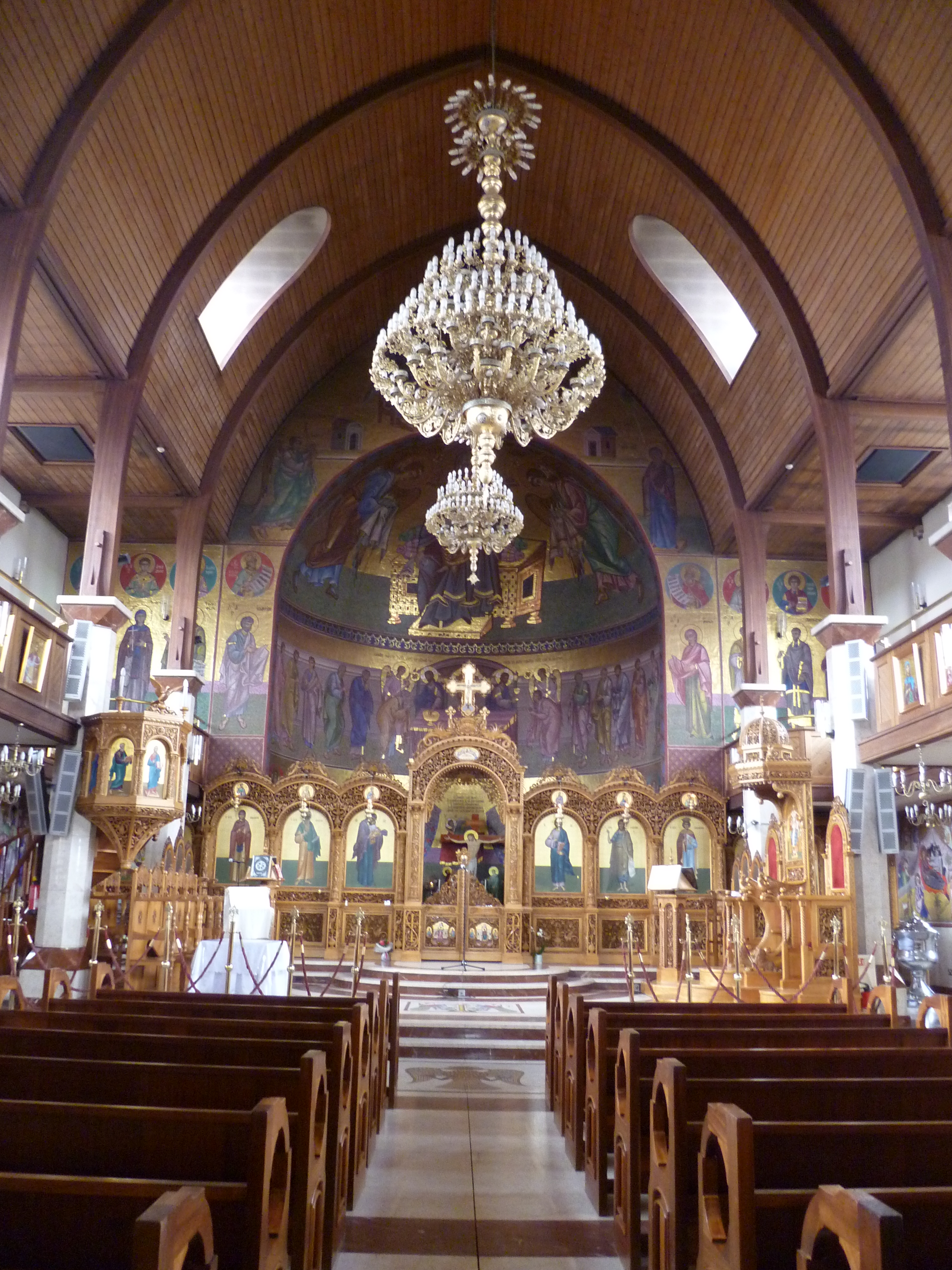
Interior.

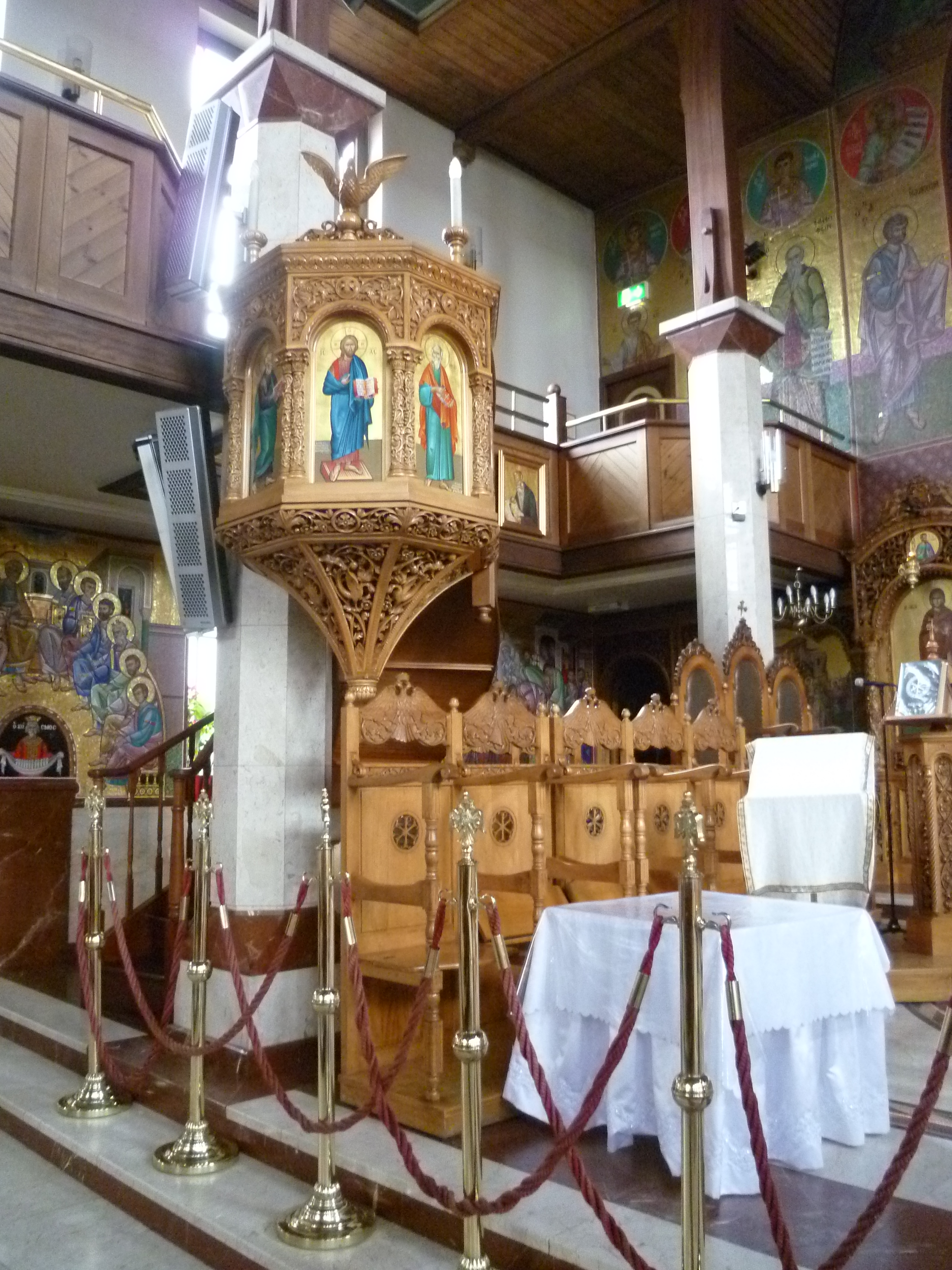
Pulpit.

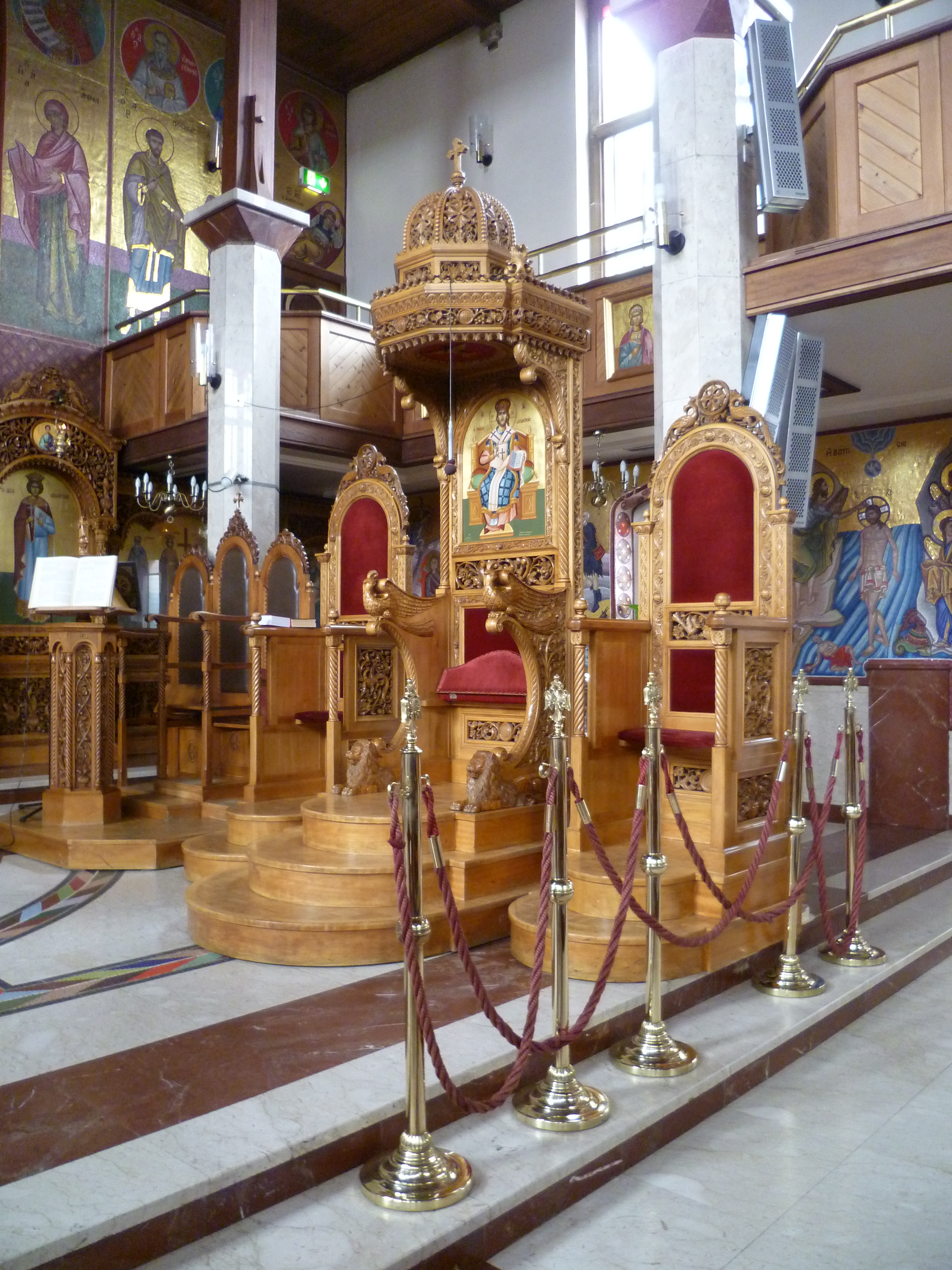
Chairs.

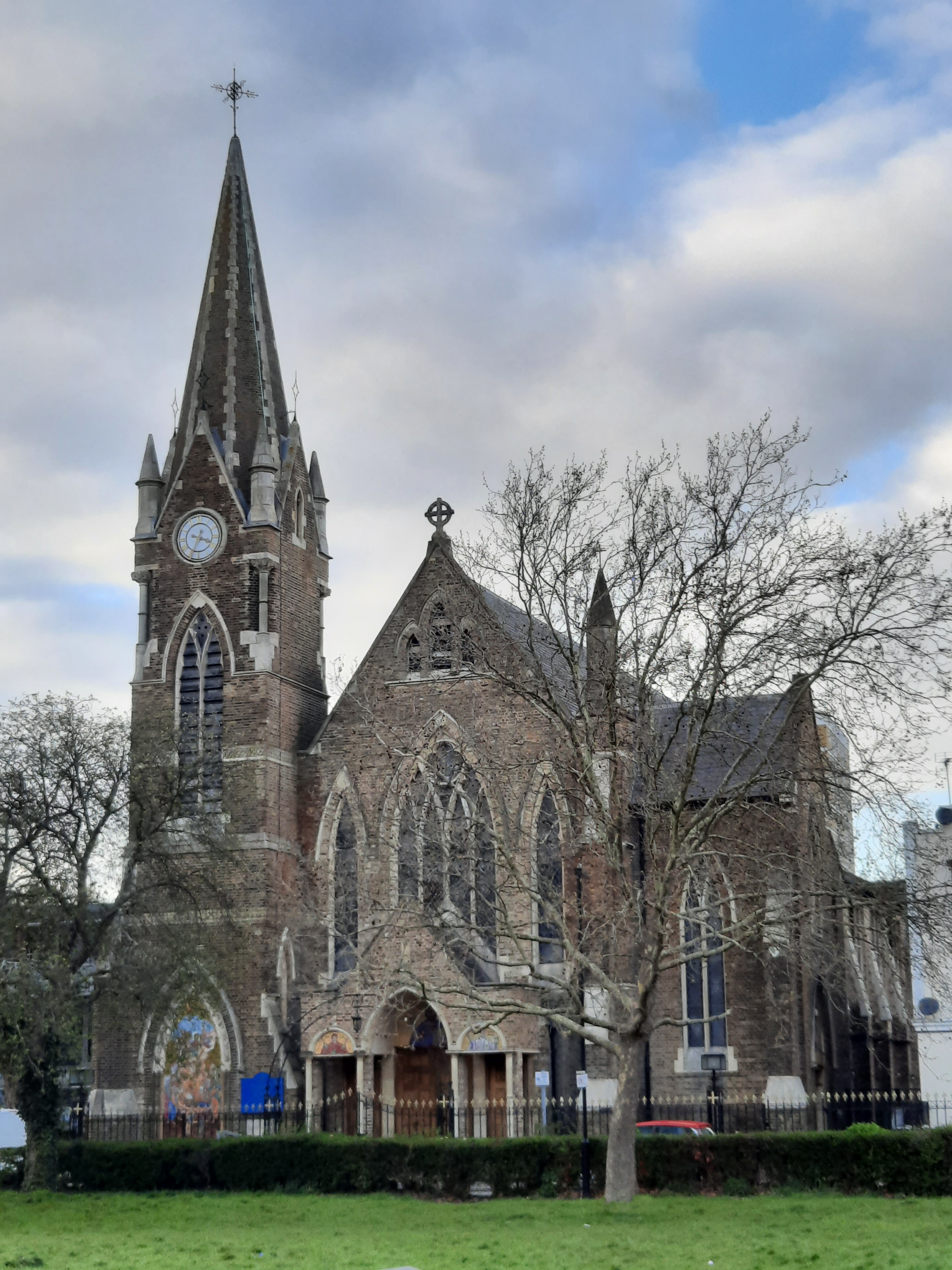
Front of church
