= Assumption High School =

Assumption High School may refer to:

== In the United States ==
- Assumption High School (Iowa), Davenport, Iowa
- Assumption High School, East St, Louis, Illinois
- Assumption High School (Kentucky), Louisville, Kentucky
- Assumption High School (Louisiana), a school in Assumption Parish, Louisiana
- Assumption Preparatory School or Assumption High School, a school in Worcester, Massachusetts
- Assumption High School (Wisconsin), Wisconsin Rapids, Wisconsin

== See also ==
- Assumption College Catholic High School, Windsor, Ontario
- Assumption College School (Brantford), Brantford, Ontario
- Assumption Secondary School, Burlington, Ontario
