= Assumption School =

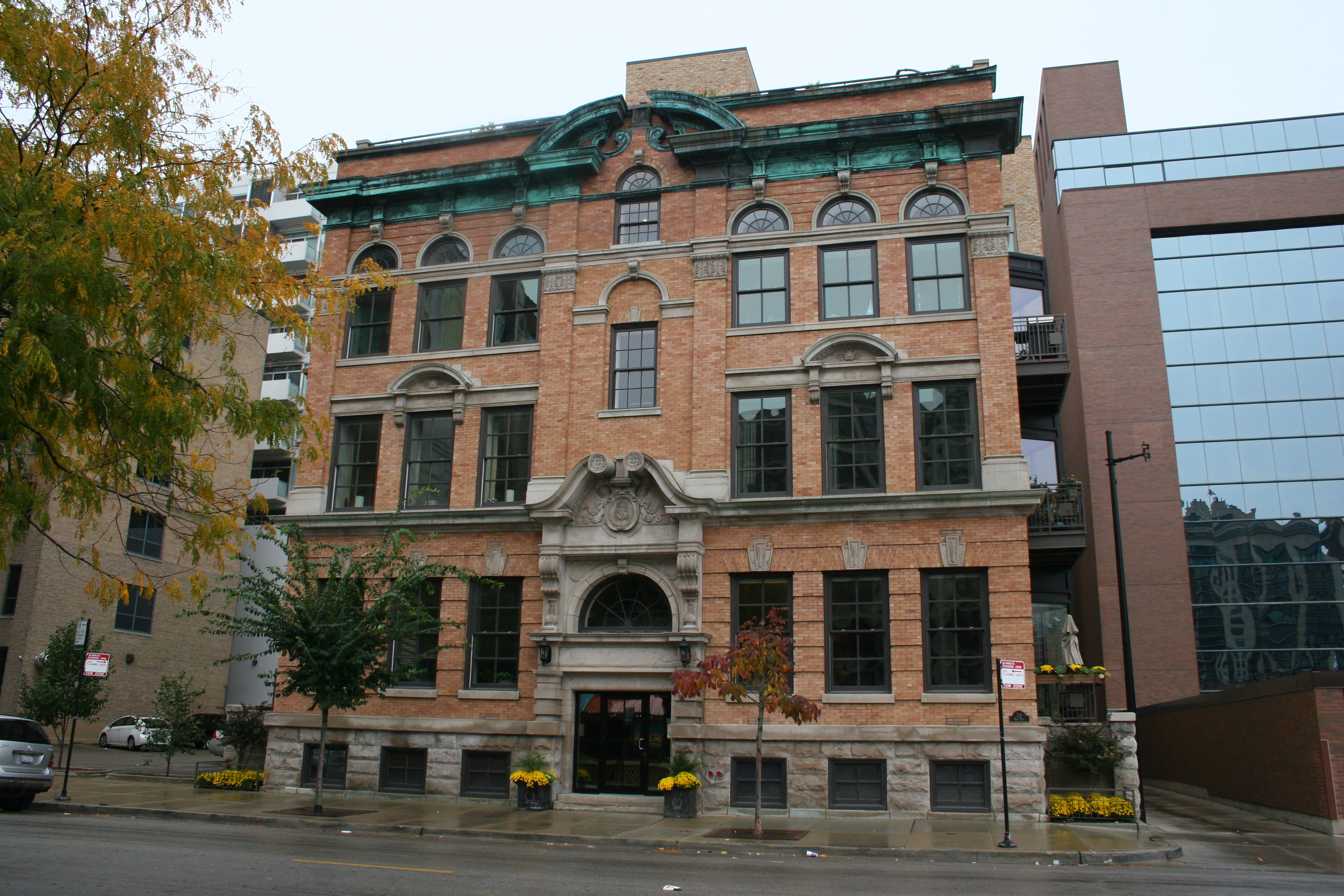
- Assumption School building

Location
- 317 West Erie Street; Chicago, Illinois 60654; United States; 41°53′37.5″N 87°38′11.5″W

Information
- Religious affiliation: Roman Catholic
- Established: 1899
- Founder: Mother Frances Cabrini
- Closed: 1945
- Oversight: Archdiocese of Chicago
- Campus type: Urban

The Assumption School was a Catholic elementary school in Chicago, Illinois, United States, from 1899 to 1945. Located at 317 West Erie Street, it was founded by Mother Frances Xavier Cabrini, the first American to be made a Catholic saint. The school originally served Chicago's Near North Side Italian American immigrant community and charged no tuition.

The school building, noted for its intricate brick and stonework and copper cornice, was designed in the Beaux-Arts style by architect Frederick Foltz (1843-1916).

After the final class graduated in 1945, the structure was mainly used for commercial purposes, and for a time it fell into disrepair. On July 10, 2003, the Chicago City Council named the building a Chicago Landmark due to its historical and architectural significance. According to Chicago Mayor Richard M. Daley, "Assumption School stands as a fine example of a late nineteenth century urban school building, and its legacy is a testament to the work Mother Cabrini accomplished."
