= Donie Church =

Heritage site in Focsani, Vrancea County, Romania

Coordinates: 45°41′41″N 27°11′13″E

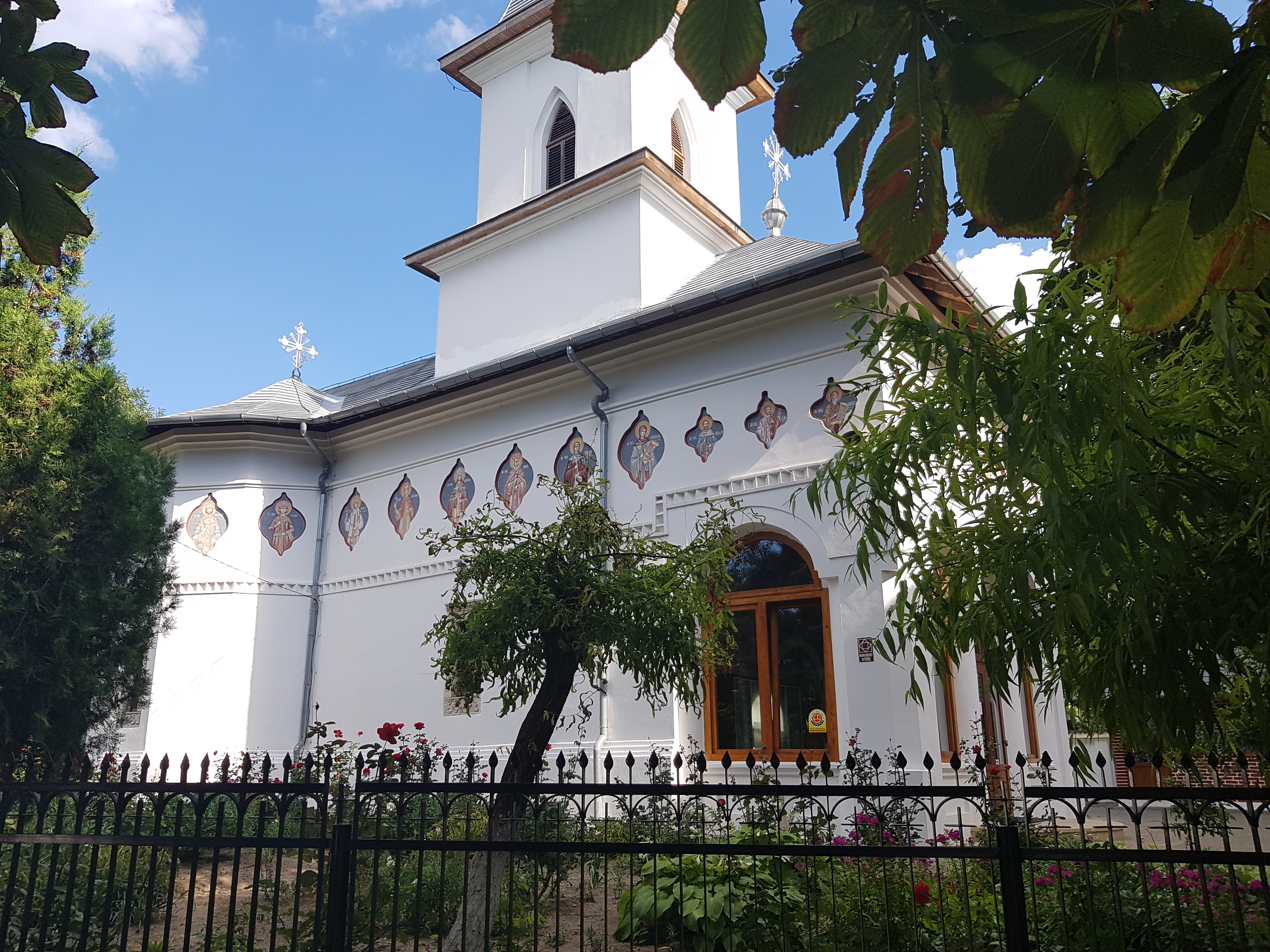
Donie Church

The Donie Church (Romanian: Biserica Adormirea Maicii Domnului - Donie) is a Romanian Orthodox church located at 6 Maior Gheorghe Pastia Street in Focșani, Romania. It is dedicated to the Dormition of the Theotokos.

The church is named after its ktetor, a Captain Donie of the border guards. It is trefoil in shape, with an originally open porch, a narthex, nave and altar. The porch initially featured semicircular arches resting on round stone columns. The facades are divided into two registers by a row of bricks above the windows. The area under the roof is slightly profiled, and features a row of cloverleaf-shaped recesses painted with saints’ portraits. The windows are surrounded by stone frames richly decorated with plant motifs.

The church is listed as a historic monument by Romania's Ministry of Culture and Religious Affairs, which supplies a construction date of 1708–1712.
