= Dormition Cathedral (Berat) =

Cultural monument and museum in Albania

- Katedralja Fjetja e Shën Mërisë (Albanian)
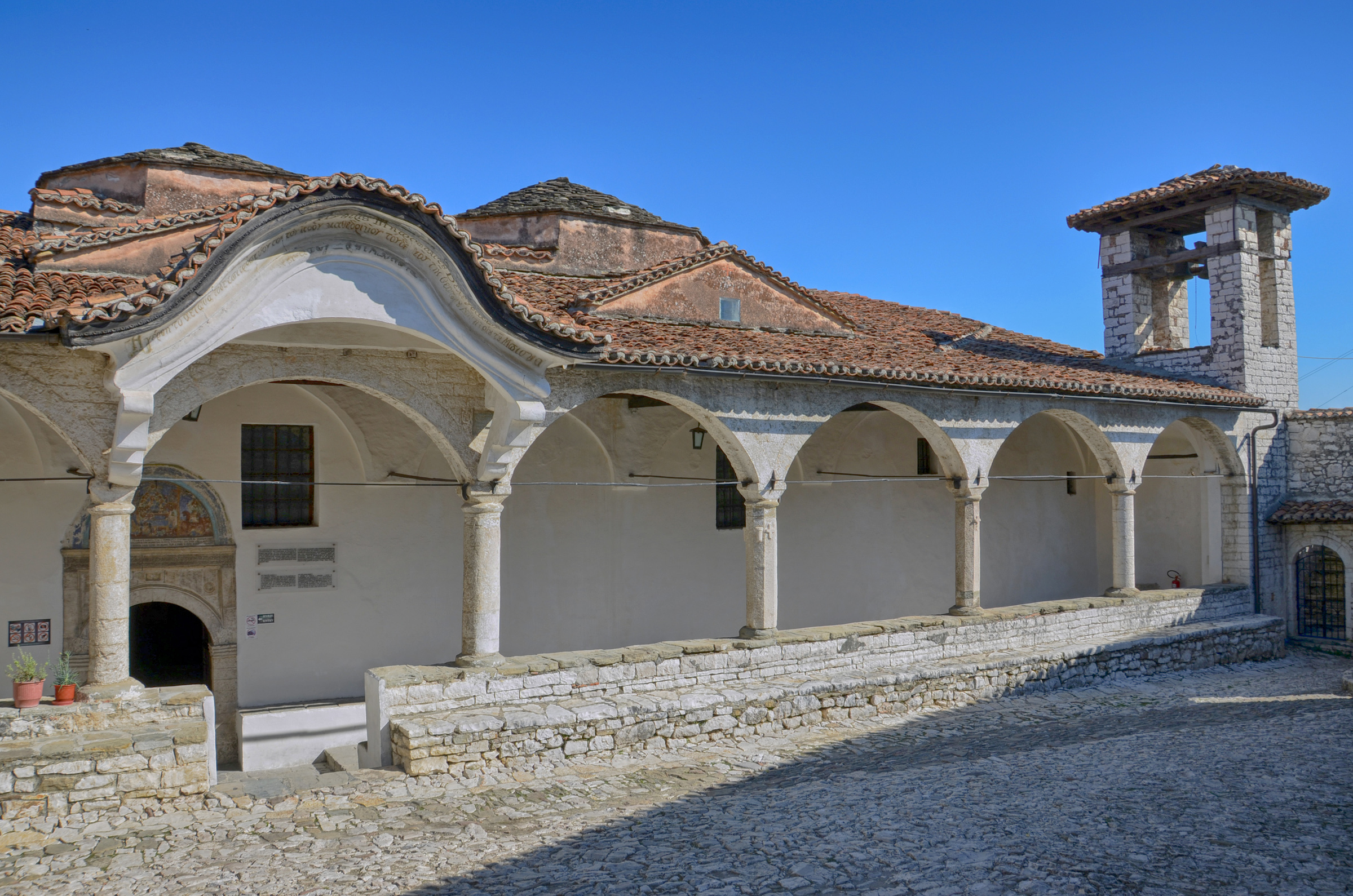
- Interactive map of Dormition Cathedral
- 40.7092°N 19.9452°E
- Location: Berat

Cultural Monument of Albania

The Dormition Cathedral (Albanian: Katedralja Fjetja e Shën Mërisë) is an Albanian Orthodox church in Berat Castle in Berat, Albania, dedicated to the Dormition of the Theotokos. It has been a Cultural Monument of Albania since 1948. Since 1986, the Onufri Museum of Icons is located in the church.
