= Dormition (disambiguation) =

Dormition may refer to:

- Dormition of the Mother of God, a major religious feast in Eastern Christianity
- Dormition of Saint Anne, a minor religious feast in Eastern Christianity

== See also ==
- Dormition of the Mother of God (disambiguation)
- Church of the Dormition of the Theotokos (disambiguation)
- Cathedral of the Dormition of the Theotokos (disambiguation)
