= Basilica of the Assumption =

Basilica of the Assumption may refer to:

== Austria ==
- Gurk Cathedral

== Belarus ==
- Cathedral Basilica of the Assumption of the Blessed Virgin Mary, Pinsk

== Croatia ==
- Euphrasian Basilica, Poreč, Istria

== Cuba ==
- Cathedral Basilica of Santiago de Cuba

== Czech Republic ==
- Basilica of the Assumption of Our Lady, Brno
- Basilica of the Assumption (Prague)

== Germany ==
- Basilica of the Assumption and Saint John the Evangelist, Waldsassen, Bavaria

== Hungary ==
- Esztergom Basilica
- Cathedral Basilica of Győr
- Basilica of the Assumption of the Blessed Virgin Mary, Székesfehérvár

== India ==
- Basilica of Our Lady of the Assumption, Secunderabad

== Italy ==
- Basilica di Nostra Signora Assunta, Genoa, Liguria
- Basilica of Santa Maria Assunta, Alcamo, Sicily
- Torcello Cathedral, Veneto

== Latvia ==
- Basilica of the Assumption, Aglona

== Mexico ==
- Guadalajara Cathedral

== Peru ==
- Cusco Cathedral

== Poland ==
- Białystok Cathedral
- Basilica of the Assumption, Węgrów
- Archcathedral Basilica of the Assumption of the Blessed Virgin Mary and St. Andrew, Frombork
- Kielce Cathedral
- Kołobrzeg Cathedral
- Basilica of the Assumption of the Blessed Virgin Mary, Krzeszów
- Łowicz Cathedral
- Cathedral Basilica of the Assumption, Pelplin
- Przemyśl Cathedral
- Sosnowiec Cathedral
- Włocławek Cathedral

== Romania ==
- Cathedral Basilica of St. Mary, Oradea

== Spain ==
- Basilica of the Assumption of Our Lady of Valencia

== United States ==
- Basilica of the National Shrine of the Assumption of the Blessed Virgin Mary, Baltimore, Maryland

== See also ==
- Cathedral of the Assumption (disambiguation)
- Cathedral of Our Lady of the Assumption (disambiguation)
- Cathedral of Saint Mary of the Assumption (disambiguation)
- Cathedral of Santa Maria Assunta (disambiguation)
- Cathedral of the Assumption of the Blessed Virgin Mary (disambiguation)
- Cathedral of the Dormition (disambiguation)
