= Cathedral of Our Lady of the Assumption =

Cathedral of Our Lady of the Assumption or other variations on the name, may refer to:

== Angola ==
- Our Lady of the Assumption Cathedral, Saurimo

== Brazil ==
- Cathedral Basilica of Our Lady of Assumption, Mariana

== China ==
- Our Lady of the Assumption Cathedral, Ningbo

== Canada ==
- Our Lady of the Assumption Cathedral, Moncton, New Brunswick
- Our Lady Of The Assumption Co-Cathedral, Gravelbourg, Saskatchewan.

== Colombia ==
- Cathedral Basilica of Our Lady of the Assumption, Popayán

== Congo, Democratic Republic of the ==
- Our Lady of the Assumption Cathedral, Boma

== Cuba ==
- Cathedral Basilica of Our Lady of the Assumption, Santiago de Cuba

== France ==
- Cathedral of Our Lady of the Assumption, Mata-Utu

== Gambia ==
- Our Lady of the Assumption Cathedral, Banjul

== Haiti ==
- Our Lady of the Assumption Cathedral, Cap-Haïtien
- Cathedral of Our Lady of the Assumption, Port-au-Prince

== Hungary ==
- Our Lady of the Assumption Cathedral, Kaposvár

== Mexico ==
- Cathedral Basilica of Our Lady of the Assumption, Aguascalientes
- Guadalajara Cathedral
- Cathedral of Our Lady of the Assumption, Oaxaca
- Our Lady of the Assumption Cathedral, Tlaxcala

== Nicaragua ==
- Our Lady of the Assumption Cathedral, Granada
- Our Lady of the Assumption Cathedral, Juigalpa
- León Cathedral, Nicaragua

== Papua New Guinea ==
- Our Lady of the Assumption Cathedral, Buka

== Paraguay ==
- Metropolitan Cathedral of Our Lady of the Assumption, Asunción

== Portugal ==
- Our Lady of the Assumption Cathedral, Elvas
- Our Lady of the Assumption Cathedral, Lamego
- Our Lady of the Assumption Cathedral, Santarém

== Spain ==
- Mosque–Cathedral of Córdoba, officially called the Cathedral of Our Lady of the Assumption, in Córdoba, Spain

== Swaziland ==
- Our Lady of Assumption Cathedral, Manzini

== Syria ==
- Cathedral of Our Lady of the Assumption, Aleppo

== United Kingdom ==
- St Mary's Cathedral, Edinburgh (Catholic)

== Venezuela ==
- Our Lady of the Assumption Cathedral, Maracay, Roman Catholic
- Cathedral of Our Lady of the Assumption in Maracay (Syriac Catholic)

== See also ==
- Cathedral of the Assumption (disambiguation)
- Our Lady of the Assumption Church (disambiguation)
- Pro-Cathedral of Our Lady of the Assumption (Brunei)
