= Cathedral of the Assumption =

Assumption Cathedral may refer to any of a number of cathedrals consecrated to the Assumption of Mary in the Roman Catholic tradition.

== Austria ==
- Assumption of Mary Cathedral, Sankt Pölten
- Gurk Cathedral, Austria
- Maria Saal Cathedral, Austria
- Wiener Neustadt Cathedral (Cathedral of the Assumption of Mary and St. Rupert)

== Belarus ==
- Cathedral Basilica of the Assumption of the Blessed Virgin Mary, Pinsk
- Co-Cathedral of the Assumption of the Virgin and St. Stanislaus, Mogilev
- Assumption Cathedral, Vitebsk

== Brazil ==
- São Paulo Cathedral

== Canada ==
- Assumption Cathedral, Trois-Rivières, Quebec
- Our Lady of Assumption Co-Cathedral, Gravelbourg, Saskatchewan
- Our Lady of the Assumption Cathedral, Moncton, New Brunswick

== Croatia ==
- Assumption Cathedral in Dubrovnik
- Assumption Cathedral (Krk)
- Pula Cathedral
- Cathedral of the Assumption of the Virgin Mary, Varaždin
- Zagreb Cathedral

== Cuba ==
- Cathedral Basilica of Santiago de Cuba

== Czech Republic ==
- Co-Cathedral of the Assumption of the Virgin Mary, Opava, Czech Republic

== France ==
- Clermont-Ferrand Cathedral
- Luçon Cathedral
- Montauban Cathedral

== The Gambia ==
- Our Lady of the Assumption Cathedral, Banjul

== Georgia ==
- Cathedral of the Assumption of the Virgin, Tbilisi

== Germany ==
- Hildesheim Cathedral
- Speyer Cathedral

== Greece ==
- Assumption Cathedral, Chania, Crete

== Haiti ==
- Our Lady of the Assumption Cathedral, Cap-Haïtien

== Hungary ==
- Cathedral of the Assumption, Esztergom
- Cathedral Basilica of Győr
- Kalocsa Cathedral
- Our Lady of the Assumption Cathedral, Kaposvár
- Assumption Cathedral, Miskolc
- Vác Cathedral

== Indonesia ==
- St. Mary of the Assumption Cathedral, Jakarta

== Ireland ==
- Cathedral of the Assumption, Carlow
- Cathedral of Our Lady Assumed into Heaven and St Nicholas, Galway
- Cathedral of the Assumption, Thurles
- Cathedral of the Assumption of the Blessed Virgin Mary, Tuam

== Italy ==
- Chioggia Cathedral
- Lecce Cathedral
- Naples Cathedral
- Novara Cathedral
- Pisa Cathedral
- Sarzana Cathedral
- Torcello Cathedral
- Venafro Cathedral

== Japan ==
- Assumption of Mary Cathedral, Hiroshima

== Malta ==
- Cathedral of the Assumption, Victoria

== Marshall Islands ==
- Cathedral of the Assumption, Majuro

== Mexico ==
- Aguascalientes Cathedral
- Guadalajara Cathedral
- Mexico City Metropolitan Cathedral

== Nepal ==
- Assumption of the Blessed Virgin Mary Cathedral, Kathmandu

== North Macedonia ==
- Cathedral of Assumption of Blessed Virgin Mary (Strumica)

== Papua New Guinea ==
- Our Lady of the Assumption Cathedral, Buka

== Peru ==
- Cusco Cathedral

== Poland ==
- Cathedral Basilica of the Assumption of the Blessed Virgin Mary, Białystok
- Archcathedral Basilica of the Assumption of the Blessed Virgin Mary and St. Andrew, Frombork
- Cathedral Basilica of the Assumption of the Blessed Virgin Mary, Gdańsk
- Gniezno Cathedral
- St. Mary's Cathedral, Gorzów Wielkopolski
- Kielce Cathedral (Cathedral Basilica of the Assumption of the Blessed Virgin Mary)
- Kołobrzeg Cathedral (Co-Cathedral Basilica of the Assumption)
- Łowicz Cathedral (Cathedral Basilica of the Assumption of the Blessed Virgin Mary)
- Cathedral Basilica of the Assumption, Pelplin
- Płock Cathedral
- Przemyśl Cathedral
- Sosnowiec Cathedral (Cathedral Basilica of the Assumption of the Blessed Virgin Mary)
- Włocławek Cathedral

== Portugal ==
- Old Cathedral of Coimbra
- Cathedral of Évora
- Cathedral of Our Lady of the Assumption, Funchal
- Our Lady of the Assumption Cathedral, Lamego
- Our Lady of the Assumption Cathedral, Leiria
- Porto Cathedral
- Viseu Cathedral

== Romania ==
- Assumption of Mary Cathedral, Baia Mare
- Cathedral Basilica of St. Mary, Oradea

== Russia ==
- Cathedral of the Assumption of the Blessed Virgin Mary (Saint Petersburg)

== Slovakia ==
- Cathedral of the Assumption of the Blessed Virgin Mary, Rožňava

== Slovenia ==
- Assumption Cathedral, Koper

== Spain ==
- Jaén Cathedral
- Mondoñedo Cathedral
- Pamplona Cathedral
- Valencia Cathedral

== Switzerland ==
- Chur Cathedral

== Thailand ==
- Assumption Cathedral, Bangkok

== Ukraine ==
- Cathedral of the Assumption of the Blessed Virgin Mary, Kharkiv
- Armenian Cathedral of Lviv
- Cathedral Basilica of the Assumption, Lviv
- Assumption of the Blessed Virgin Mary Cathedral, Odesa

== United Kingdom ==
- St Mary's Cathedral, Aberdeen, Scotland

== United States ==
- Cathedral of Saint Mary of the Assumption (San Francisco, California)
- Cathedral Basilica of the Assumption (Covington, Kentucky)
- Cathedral of the Assumption (Louisville, Kentucky)
- Cathedral of St. Mary of the Assumption (Fall River, Massachusetts)
- Cathedral of Mary of the Assumption (Saginaw, Michigan)
- Cathedral of St. Mary of the Assumption (Trenton, New Jersey)

== Uzbekistan ==
- Cathedral of the Assumption of the Virgin, Tashkent

== See also ==
- Cathedral of the Dormition of the Theotokos (disambiguation)
- Basilica of the Assumption (disambiguation)
- Cathedral of Our Lady of the Assumption (disambiguation)
- Cathedral of Saint Mary of the Assumption (disambiguation)
- Cathedral of Santa Maria Assunta (disambiguation)
- Cathedral of the Assumption of the Blessed Virgin Mary (disambiguation)
- Cathedral of the Dormition (disambiguation)
