= Cathedral of the Assumption of the Blessed Virgin Mary, Rab =

Cathedral of the Assumption of the Blessed Virgin Mary
- Katedrala Uznesenja Blažene Djevice Marije
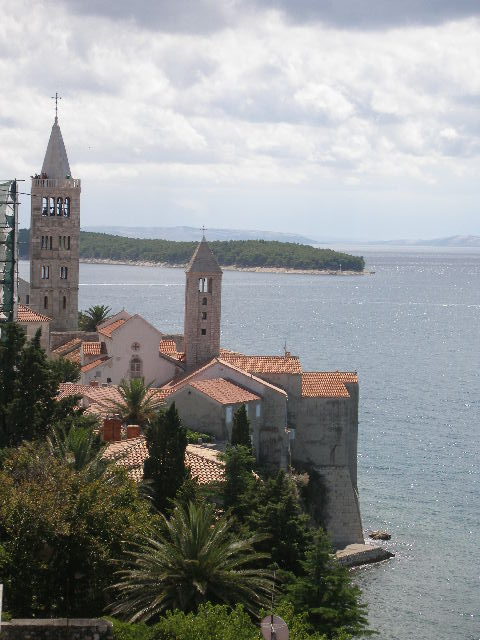
- Cathedral of the Assumption of the Blessed Virgin Mary
- 44°45′15″N 14°45′43″E
- Location: Rab
- Country: Croatia
- Denomination: Roman Catholic Church

Administration
- Diocese: Roman Catholic Diocese of Krk

The Cathedral of the Assumption of the Blessed Virgin Mary (also called Old Rab Cathedral; Croatian: Katedrala Uznesenja Blažene Djevice Marije) is a Catholic church located in Rab, Croatia. It is part of the Diocese of Krk.

Recent archaeological finds indicate that it is built on an early Christian church, dating from around the fourth to fifth century. In the ninth century it was rebuilt and decorated with new architectural elements, such as the ciborium that still hangs over the main altar. Its twelfth-century façade and the influences of Romanesque Tuscany are evident. The cathedral's bell tower was built in the fifteenth century after a lightning strike destroyed the original Romanesque one. In the second half of the sixteenth century, the apse of the chapel of the Holy Cross and the altar with a colorful late Renaissance wooden crucifix were also added.

It contains liturgical objects and precious relics, including enameled copper plates and the twelfth-century reliquary of St. Christopher. The church is the former seat of the Diocese of Rab, abolished by the pope in 1828.

Between 1997 and 2005, the cathedral underwent extensive renovation awarded with a Europa Nostra Diploma "for the comprehensive research, skillful restoration and didactical presentation of one of Croatia’s foremost medieval monuments".

== See also ==
- Roman Catholicism in Croatia
- Assumption Cathedral
