= Assumption of the Blessed Virgin Mary Cathedral, Odesa =

Coordinates: 46.4804°N 30.7392°E

Assumption of the Blessed Virgin Mary Cathedral
- Катедральний собор Успіння Пресвятої Діви Марії
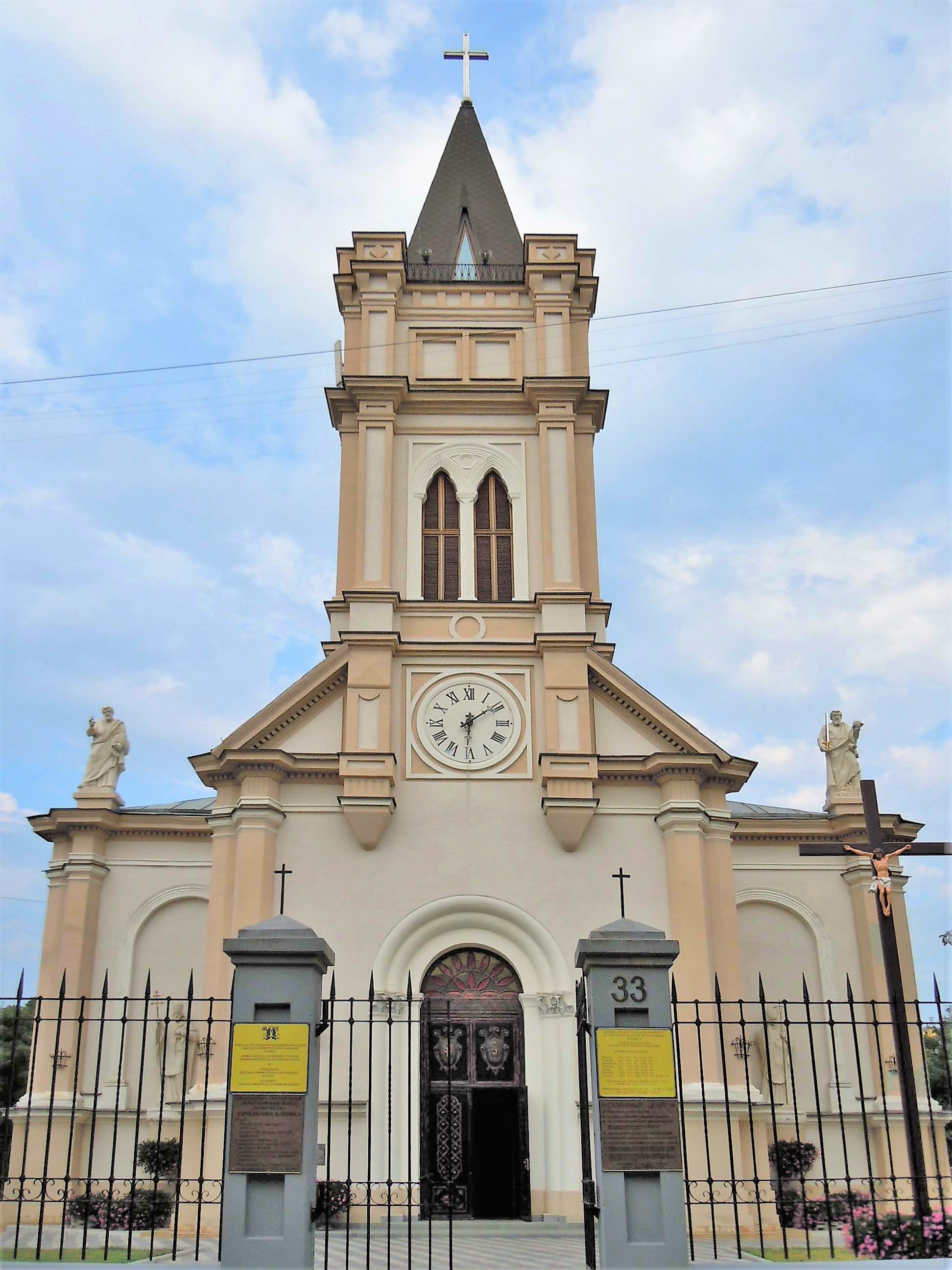
- Assumption of the Blessed Virgin Mary Cathedral
- Location: Odesa
- Country: Ukraine
- Denomination: Roman Catholic Church

Immovable Monument of Local Significance of Ukraine
- Official name: Собор (костьол) Римсько-католицький Успіння Пресвятої Богородиці (арх. Гонсіоровський Ф.В., за участю Моранді Ф.Й.) (Roman Catholic Cathedral (Church) of the Assumption of the Blessed Virgin Mary (arch. F. V. Gonsiorovskiy, involving F. Y. Morandi))
- Type: Architecture, Urban Planning
- Reference no.: 330-Од

The Assumption of the Blessed Virgin Mary Cathedral (Ukrainian: Катедральний собор Успіння Пресвятої Діви Марії, romanized: Katedralnyi sobor Uspinnia Presviatoi Divy Marii) also called Cathedral of the Blessed Virgin Mary is the name given to a religious building belonging to the Catholic Church and is located in the city of Odesa in the southwest part of the European country of Ukraine.

The temple follows the Roman or Latin rite and was built between 1844 and 1853 thanks to the efforts of Catholics from Poland and Germany and the initiative of Father Grzegorz Razutowicz, designed by Polish architect Feliks Gąsiorowski with the help of Italian architect Francesco Morandi.

The church was built as a three-aisled basilica with a dome selected cruise on a cruciform plan. Inside white and gray marble were used. In the painting of the main altar is an image of the Assumption of the Virgin Mary in 1850 which is a copy of Raphael. The interior is adorned with many valuable paintings and large crystal chandeliers. Pope Pius IX donated to the church in 1852 marble baptismal font. Next to the church is an orphanage, a nursing home, a Catholic school and a shelter for children was built.

On March 14, 2022, the Congregation for Divine Worship and the Discipline of the Sacraments granted a decree of pontifical coronation to the venerated Marian icon of "Our Lady of the Assumption" that is enthroned in the cathedral’s altar. Pope Francis blessed the crown on August 3 and the coronation rites was held on August 15 of the same year, the Solemnity of the Assumption.

== See also ==
- Roman Catholicism in Ukraine
- Assumption Cathedral (disambiguation)

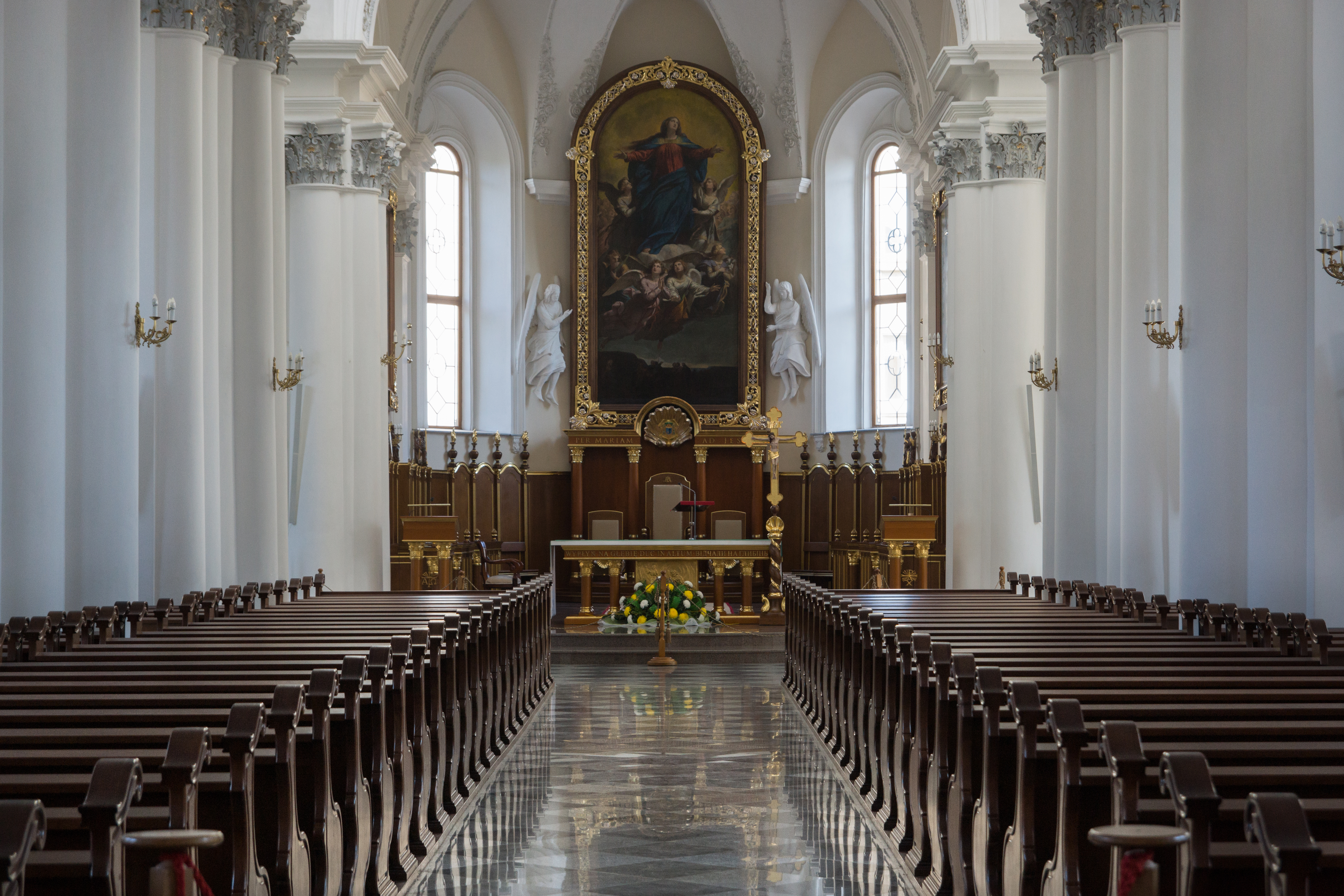
Internal view
