= Maria Saal Cathedral =

Coordinates: 46.6811°N 14.3463°E

- Propstei- und Wallfahrtskirche Mariae Himmelfahrt (German); Maria Saaler Dom (German)
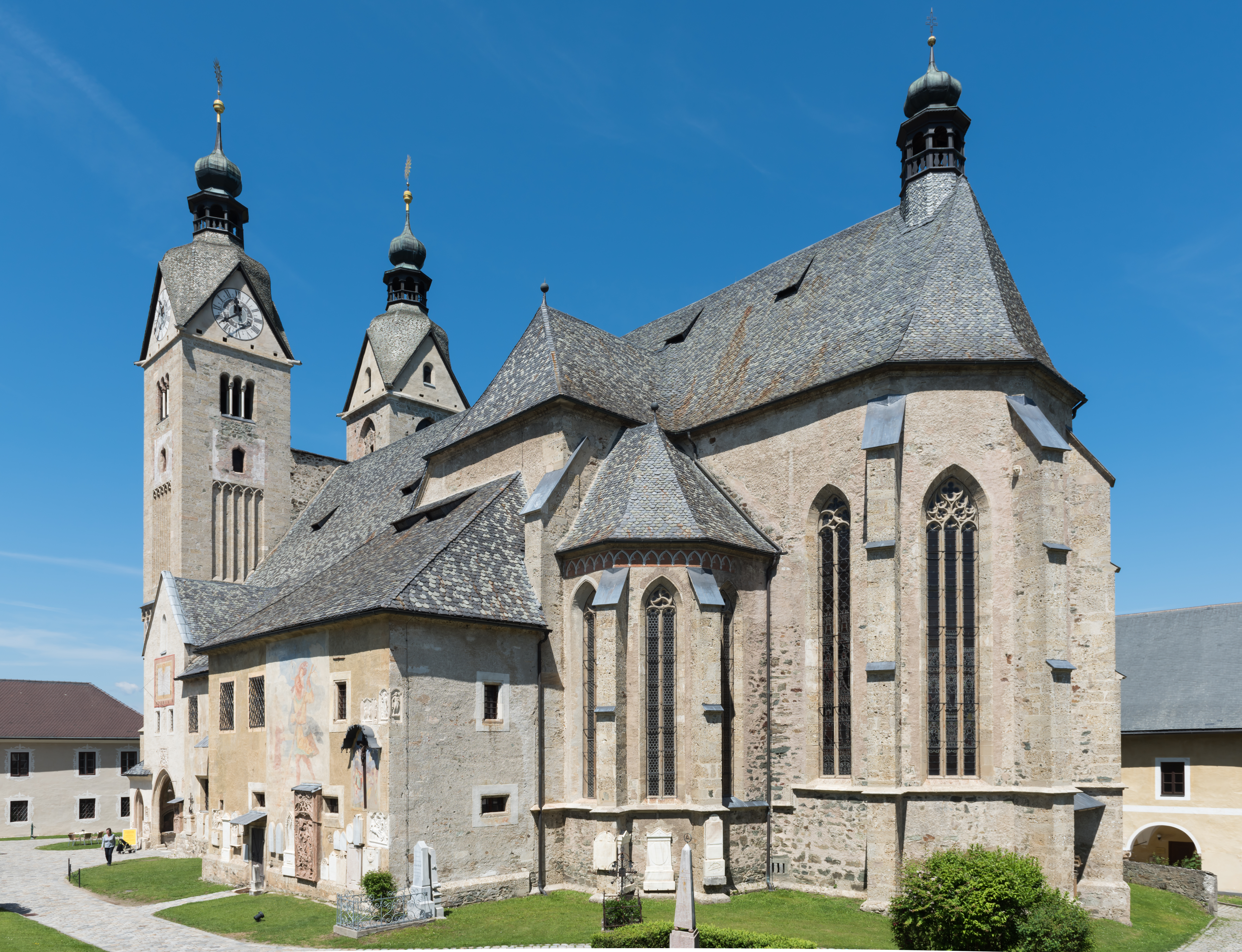
- Location: Maria Saal
- Country: Austria
- Denomination: Roman Catholic

History
- Status: Pilgrimage church

Architecture
- Architectural type: Hall church
- Style: Late Gothic
- Years built: 1430-1459

Specifications
- Length: 50 metres (160 ft)
- Width: 20 metres (66 ft)

The Pilgrimage Church of the Assumption of Mary (German: Propstei- und Wallfahrtskirche Maria Himmelfahrt), also called Maria Saal Cathedral (German: Maria Saaler Dom), is a Catholic church in the town of Maria Saal in Carinthia, Austria. Though not the see of a bishop, the church building is a renowned monument of Late Gothic architecture and one of Carinthia's most visited landmarks.

== History ==
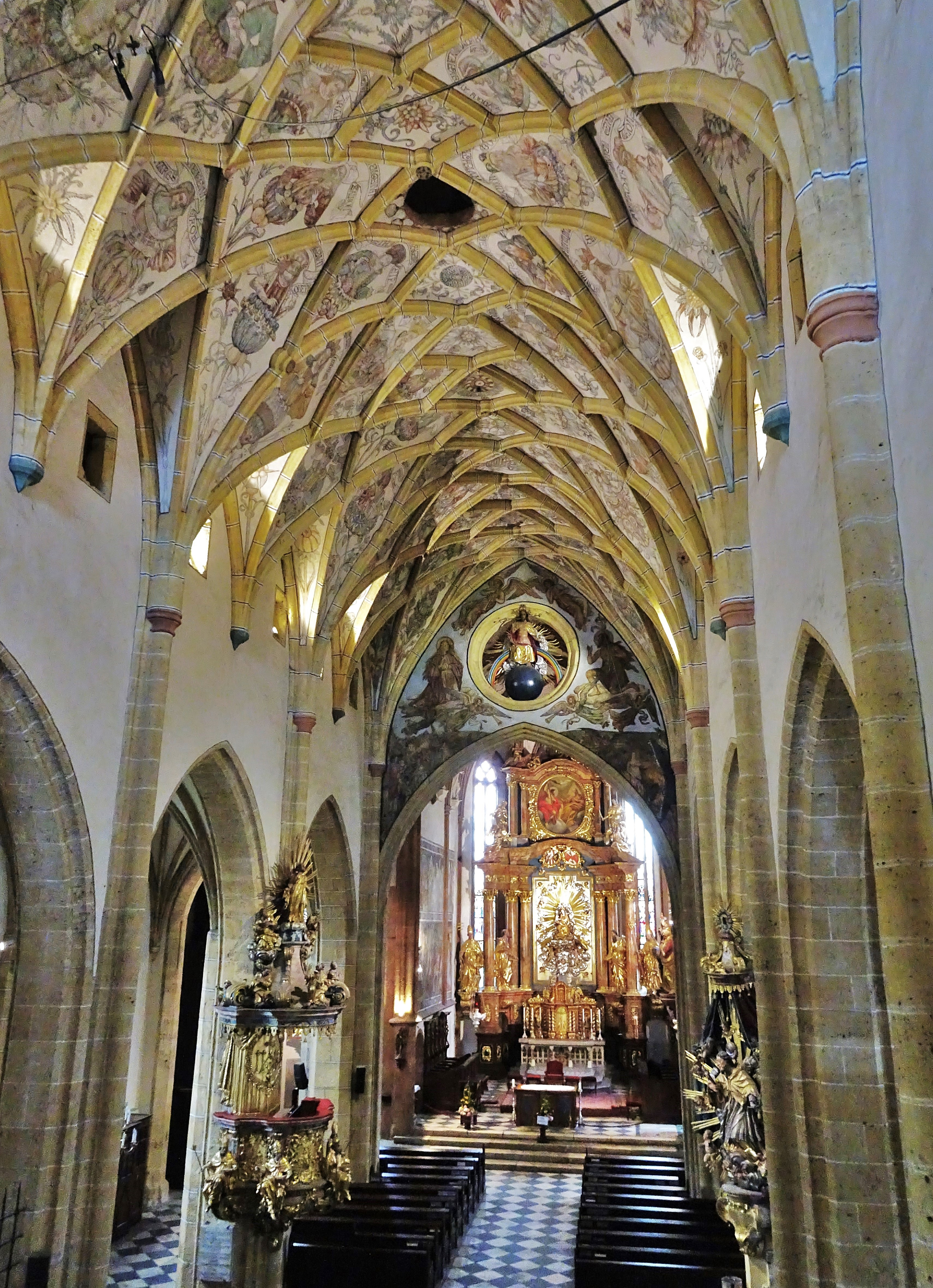
Interior

A first church dedicated to St. Mary was probably built on the site about 753 at the behest of the missionary bishop Modestus, called the Apostle of Carantania. One of the first parishes in the region, this Carolingian church became the initial point of Christianisation, therefore regarded the mother church of Carinthia assuming the title of 'cathedral' (Dom). The community was vested with extensive properties by the Archbishops of Salzburg.

From 945 the parish was under direct jurisdiction of the Salzburg archdiocese. When in 1072 a Carinthian bishop was appointed, he took his see at Gurk, and the role of a mother church passed to Gurk Cathedral erected from about 1140 onwards. Nevertheless, the church of Maria Saal remained important as the site, where the Dukes of Carinthia traditionally obtained ecclesiastical blessings after their installation at the nearby Prince's Stone.

The present-day church was built in a Late Gothic style between 1430 and 1459, then partly refurbished with a Baroque interior in the 17th century. The tradition that the bishop of Gurk is also dean of the Church of the Assumption of Mary in Maria Saal, has survived to this day.

== See also ==
- Assumption Cathedral (disambiguation)
