= Basilica of Our Lady of the Assumption, Secunderabad =

Basilica of Our Lady of the Assumption
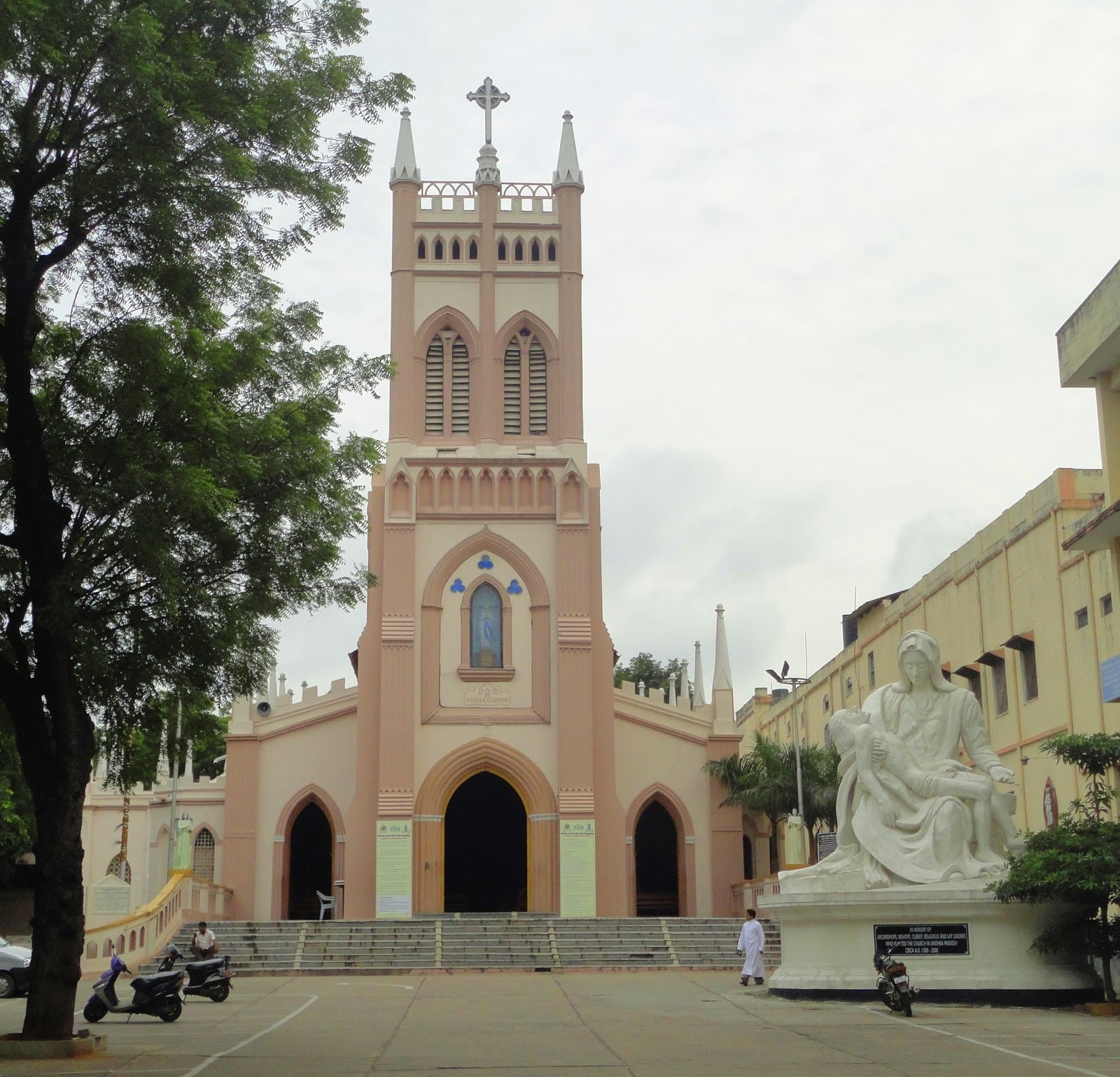

- Location within Telangana
- 17.4421°N 78.5022°E
- Location: Secunderabad, Telangana
- Country: India
- Denomination: Roman Catholic
- Website: www.stmarysbasilicasecunderabad.org

History
- Status: Basilica
- Founded: 1847
- Dedication: Blessed Virgin Mary

Architecture
- Functional status: Active
- Designated: 7 November 2008

Administration
- Diocese: Hyderabad

Basilica of Our Lady of the Assumption (commonly known as St. Mary's Church, Secunderabad) is a minor basilica located in Secunderabad, India. The decree designating it as a basilica was issued on 7 November 2008. The church is located on Sarojini Naidu Road in Secunderabad. It owes its early history to Father Daniel Murphy along with Bishop Carew. St. Mary's Church was completed in 1850. This church was formerly called the Cathedral of the Archdiocese of Hyderabad. In 1886, it ceased to be a cathedral. In 1871, a few nuns from St. Anne at Turin came here and opened a school that is popular as St. Ann's school.

St. Mary's Church is the oldest Roman Catholic church in the city of Secunderabad, India. It was formerly the Cathedral of the Archdiocese of Hyderabad. It is dedicated to the Blessed Virgin Mary. Adjacent to the church is the convent of St. Ann's which runs the St. Ann's High School, Secunderabad.

== History ==
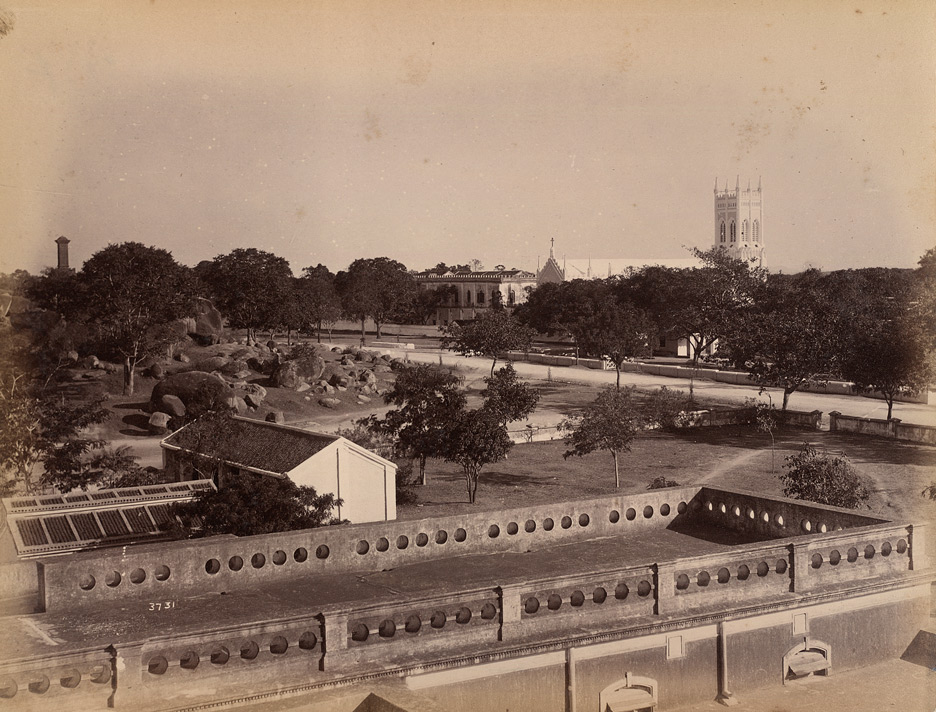
A distant view of St Mary's Roman Catholic Cathedral, c. 1890

The church began with the work of Daniel Murphy among Irish Catholics in the British Army. He arrived in India in 1839, and began the construction of St. Mary's church as a cathedral in 1840. It was completed and blessed in 1850, and was at that time the largest church in Hyderabad State. The church ceased to be a cathedral in 1886, when the see was moved from Secunderabad to Hyderabad.

== Architecture ==
The church is a typical example of the Indian Gothic style, with curved arches and pointed buttresses. As with other Catholic churches, St. Mary's has several side altars dedicated to saints.

== Bells ==
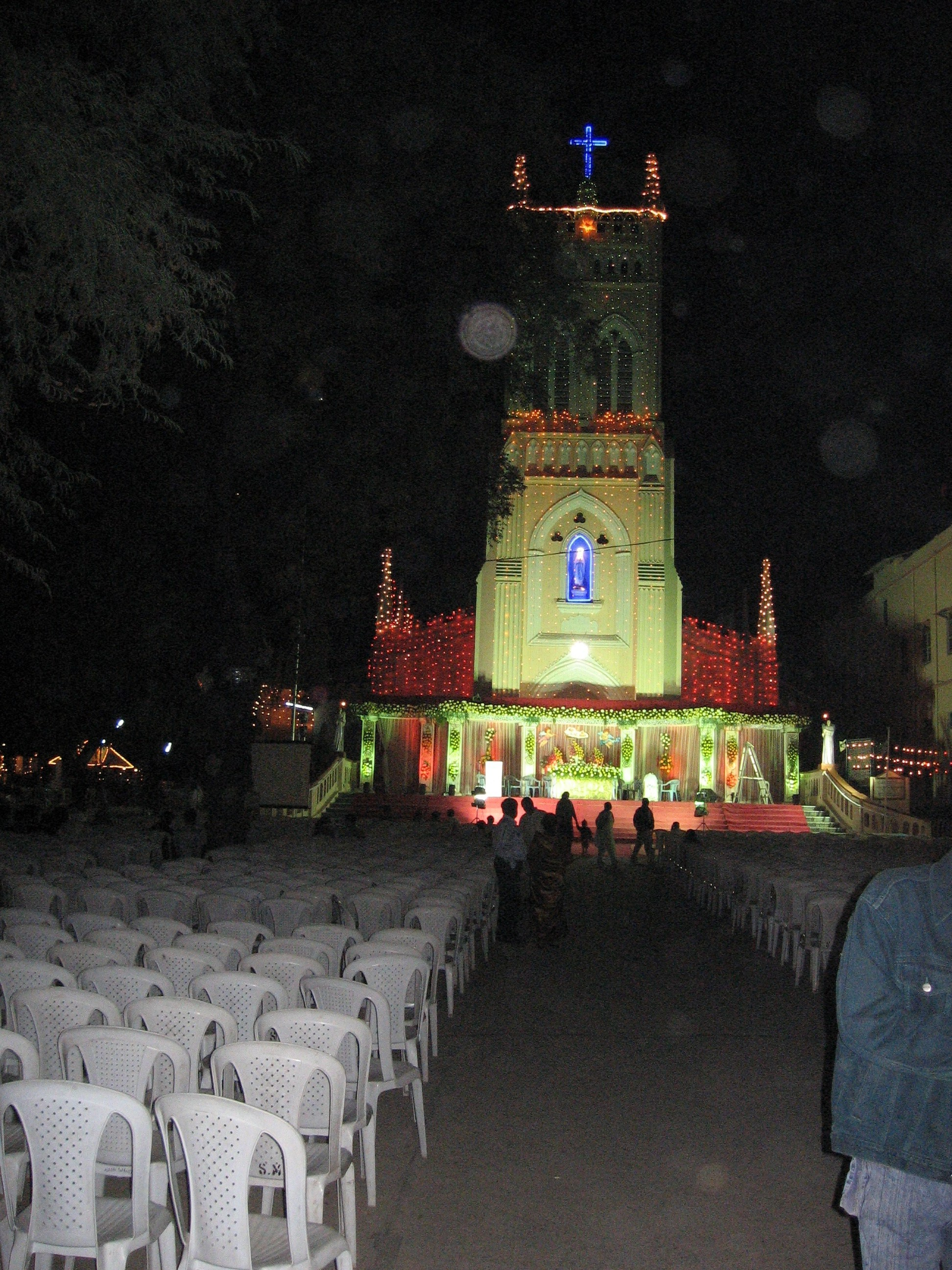
St. Mary's Church, decorated on Christmas Eve in preparation for Midnight Mass

The church has four bells, which were brought from Italy in 1901. One of the bells is reported to have developed cracks.

== See also ==
- List of churches in Secunderabad and Hyderabad

== Mass schedule ==
Daily Mass in English at 6 am and 6 pm.

Sunday Masses:

- 6 am - Tamil
- 7 am - English
- 8:15 am - Telugu
- 9:30 am - Children's Mass
- 9:30 am - English
- 11:30 am -English
- 5 pm - English
- 6 pm- English
