= Basilica di Nostra Signora Assunta, Genoa =

Church in Genoa, Italy

Coordinates: 44°24′25.78″N 8°55′45.64″E

Basilica of Our Lady of the Assumption (Basilica di Nostra Signora Assunta)
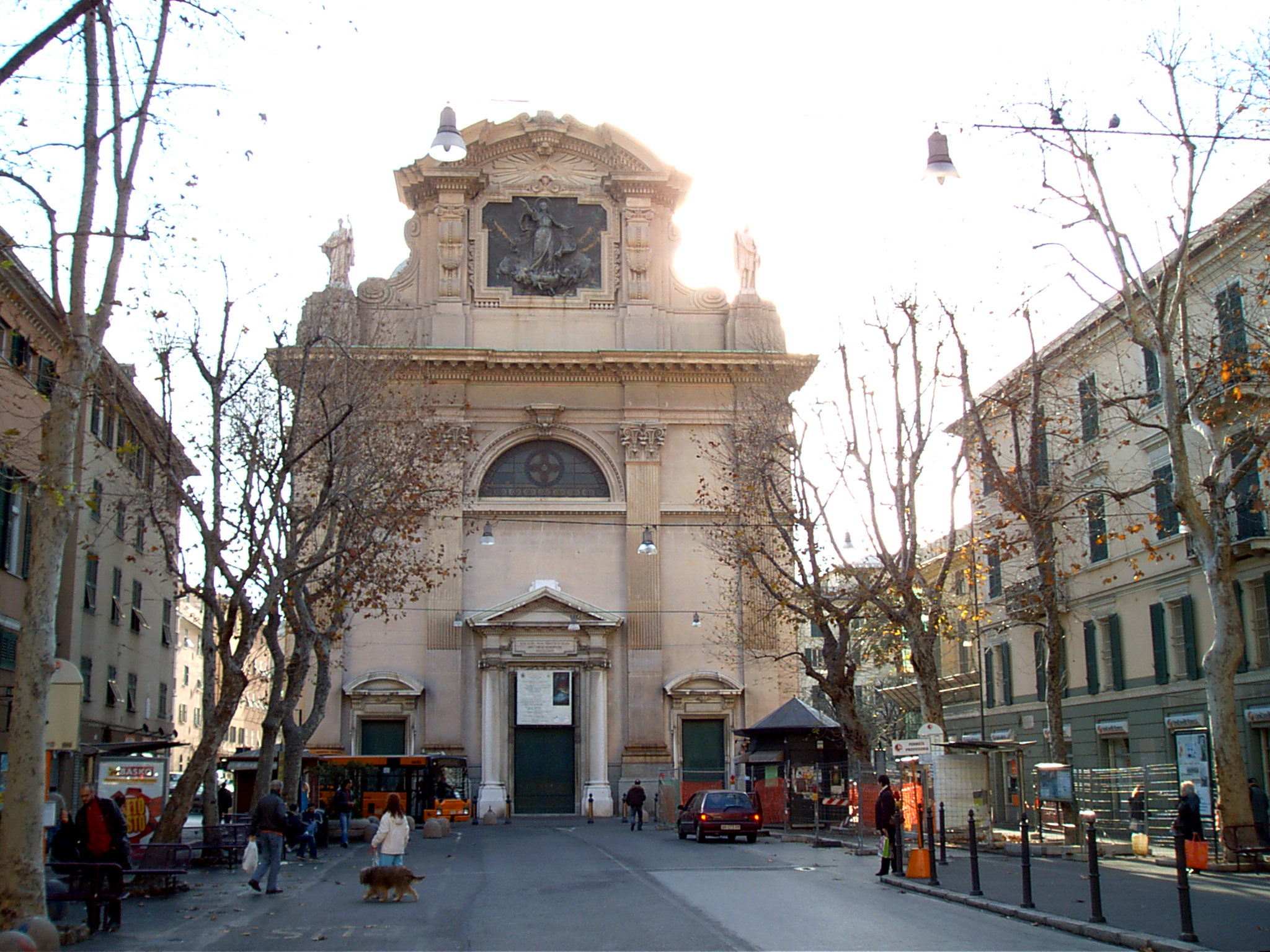
- The façade of the Basilica.

Religion
- Affiliation: Roman Catholic
- Province: Genoa
- Year consecrated: 1620

Location
- Location: Genoa, Italy
- Interactive map of Basilica of Our Lady of the Assumption (Basilica di Nostra Signora Assunta)

Architecture
- Type: Church
- Groundbreaking: 1610
- Completed: 1618

Website
- www.parrocchiaassunta.it

Basilica of Our Lady of the Assumption (Italian: Basilica di Nostra Signora Assunta) is a Roman Catholic church in the town of Genoa, in the Province of Genoa and the region of Liguria, Italy. This church was constructed during 1610–1624. After 300 years, the Baroque-style facade was added in 1932, designed by the architect Piero de Barbieri; the sculptor Luigi Venzano contributed the facade statues of St. John the Baptist and St. Joseph, while the central relief depicts the Madonna.

The interior was decorated across the centuries and includes works by Giulio Benso, Domenico Piola, Nicolò Barabino, and Gian Stefano Rossi.

It should not be confused with the distinct Santa Maria Assunta also called Santa Maria di Carignano.
