= Cathedral of the Assumption of the Blessed Virgin Mary =

Cathedral of the Assumption of the Blessed Virgin Mary may refer to:

- Cathedral of the Assumption of the Blessed Virgin Mary (Rožňava), Slovakia
- Cathedral of the Assumption of the Blessed Virgin Mary (Saint Petersburg), Russia
- Cathedral of the Assumption of the Blessed Virgin Mary, Rab, Croatia
- Cathedral of the Assumption of the Blessed Virgin Mary, Kharkiv, Ukraine
- Cathedral of the Assumption of the Blessed Virgin Mary (Lymanske), Ukraine
- Cathedral of the Assumption of the Blessed Virgin Mary, Tuam, Ireland
