= Our Lady of the Assumption Cathedral, Juigalpa =

Coordinates: 12.10661°N 85.36429°W

Our Lady of the Assumption Cathedral
- Catedral Nuestra Señora de la Asunción
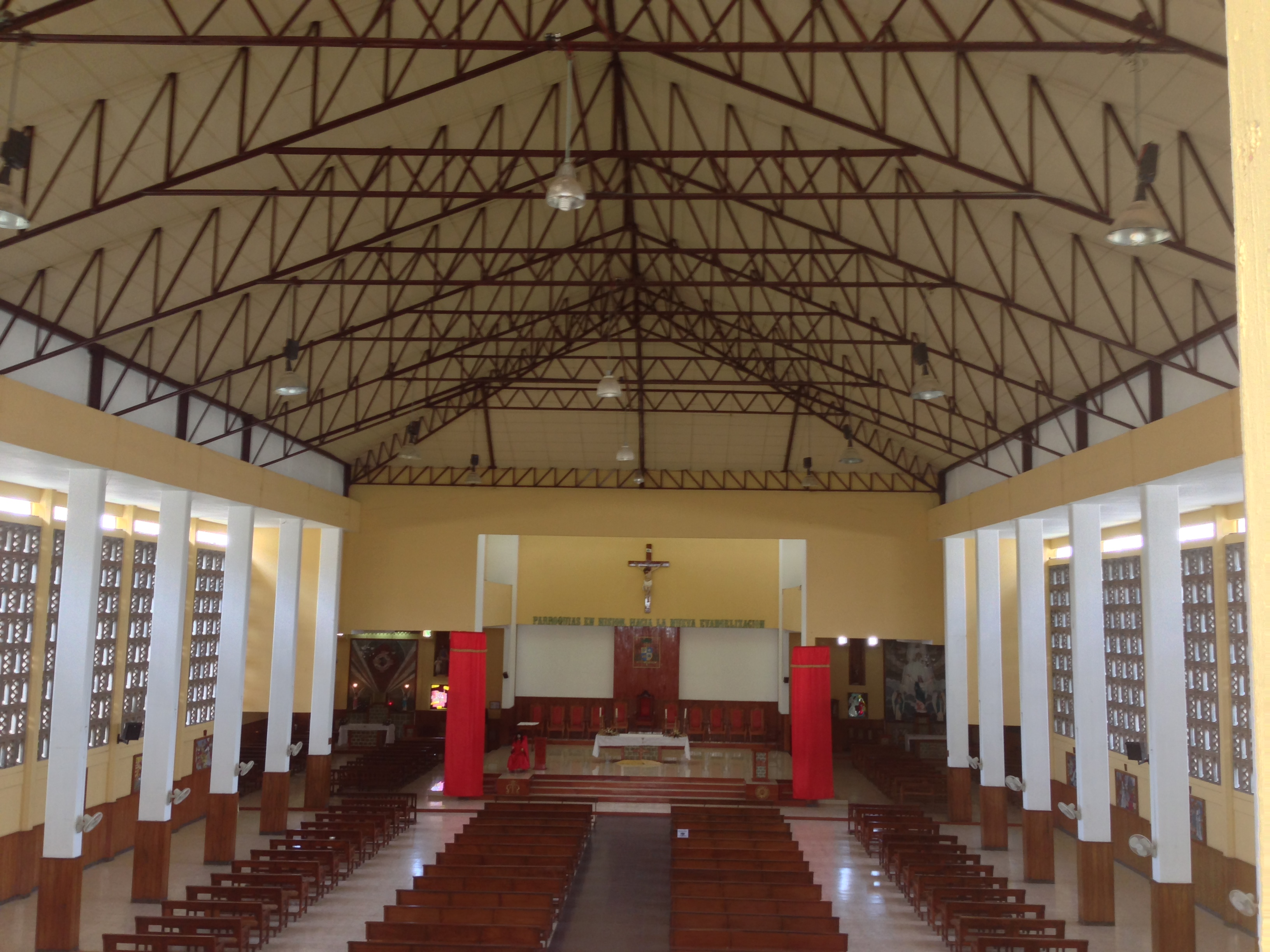
- Our Lady of the Assumption Cathedral
- Location: Juigalpa
- Country: Nicaragua
- Denomination: Roman Catholic Church

The Our Lady of the Assumption Cathedral (Spanish: Catedral Nuestra Señora de la Asunción) Also Juigalpa Cathedral Is a cathedral of the Catholic Church in the city of Juigalpa, Chontales, in the Central American country of Nicaragua. The cathedral is the mother church of the Diocese of Juigalpa. Its bishop is Socrates René Sándigo Jirón and its pastor Saúl Robleto.

The first temple of Juigalpa was built with adobe walls, thatched roof and ground floor (1648 - 1699). The Virgin of the Assumption was already the patron of Juigalpa.

Fray Alonso Cáceres was named in Juigalpa first priest the 24 of June 1704. The work of the cathedral began in 1966, and was completed after many delays in 1996.

== See also ==
- Catholic Church in Nicaragua
- Assumption of Mary

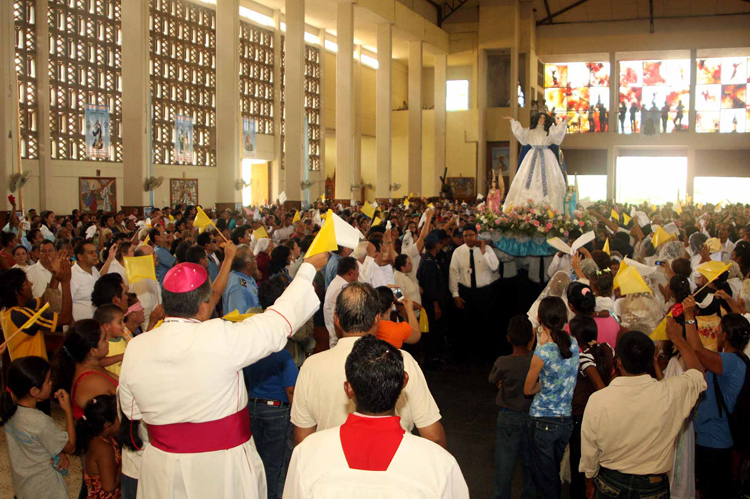
Procession inside the cathedral in 2011
