= Our Lady of the Assumption Cathedral, Banjul =

Coordinates: 13.4511°N 16.5744°W

Our Lady of the Assumption Cathedral
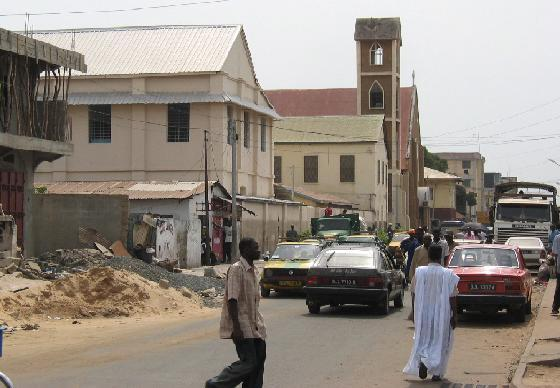
- Our Lady of the Assumption Cathedral
- Location: Banjul
- Country: Gambia
- Denomination: Roman Catholic Church

The Our Lady of the Assumption Cathedral or simply Banjul Cathedral, is a Roman Catholic church located in Banjul the capital of the African country of Gambia.

It is located on West Davidson Carrol Street, on the corner of Daniel Goddard Street, which is the main street of the city. It is the slightly larger of the two cathedrals in the city (the other belonging to the Anglican Church). The church was built in the colonial era from 1913 to 1916 when Gambia was a British colony. The status of the building change over time first in 1951 was chosen to host the apostolic prefecture and then became a cathedral when the then Bathurst, in 1957 became diocese. Since then, the cathedral has been the seat of the Diocese of Banjul.

On his journey through Senegal, Gambia and Guinea, Pope John Paul II visited the Cathedral on February 23, 1992.

== See also ==
- Roman Catholic Diocese of Banjul
- Our Lady of the Assumption
