= Aguascalientes Cathedral =

Coordinates: 21.8807°N 102.2969°W

Cathedral Basilica of Our Lady of the Assumption
- Catedral Basílica de Nuestra Señora de la Asunción
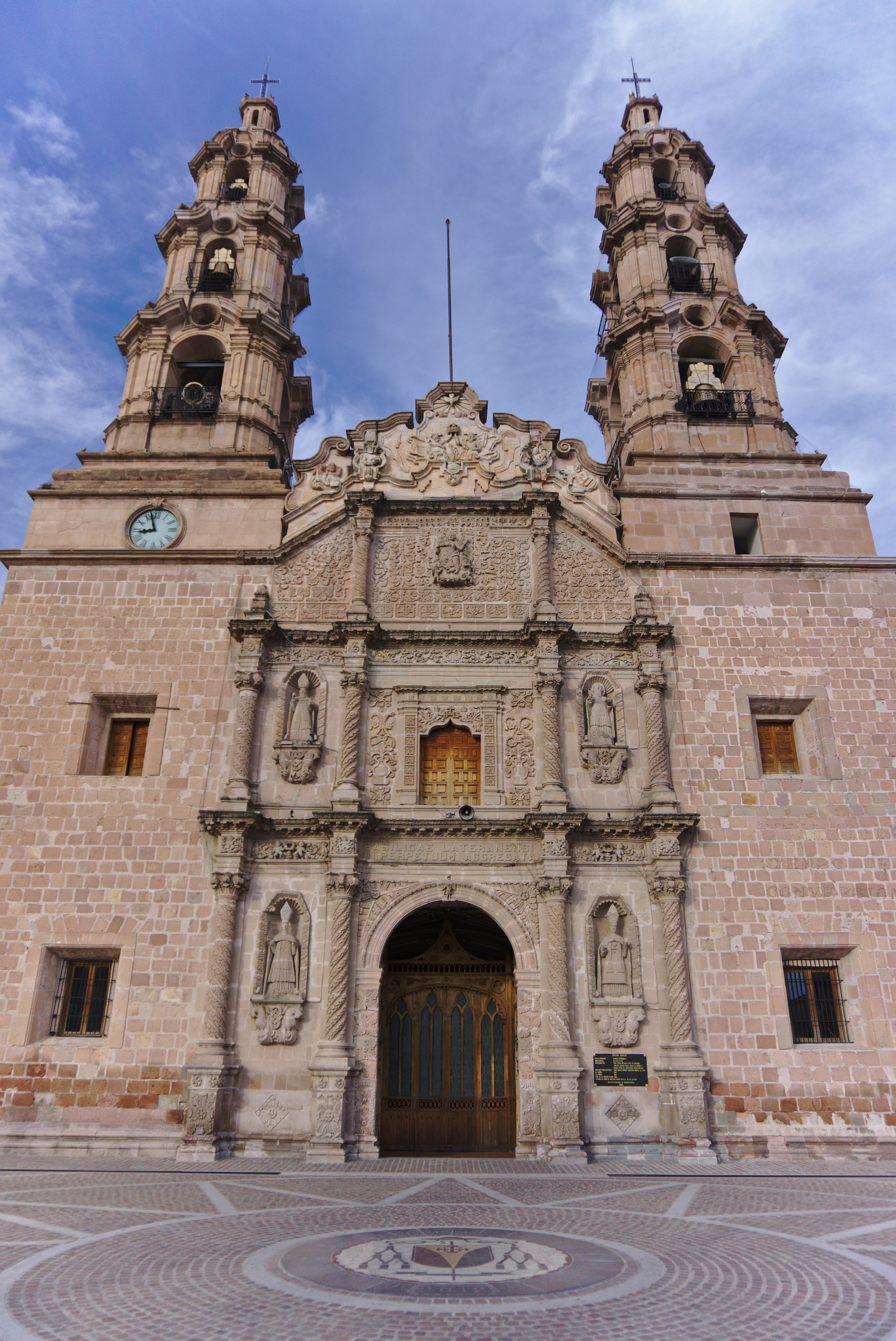
- Cathedral Basilica of Our Lady of the Assumption
- Location: Aguascalientes
- Country: Mexico
- Denomination: Roman Catholic Church

History
- Status: Cathedral, Minor basilica
- Dedication: Assumption of Mary

Architecture
- Architect: Refugio Reyes Rivas (expansion)
- Architectural type: New Spanish Baroque, Neoclassical
- Groundbreaking: 1704
- Completed: 1738

Administration
- Diocese: Diocese of Aguascalientes

Clergy
- Bishop: José María de la Torre Martín

The Cathedral Basilica of Our Lady of the Assumption (Spanish: Catedral Basílica de Nuestra Señora de la Asunción) Also Aguascalientes Cathedral It is the main Catholic building of the city of Aguascalientes in Mexico, and one of the emblematic monuments of the city. It is located in the Plaza de la Patria.

The construction of the current temple was initiated by the priest Antonio Flores de Acevedo in 1704, finishing the parish priest Manuel Colón de Larreátegui in 1738. The image of the Virgin of the Assumption was brought from Spain.

The construction consists of atrial bard composed of quarry pillars and trellis with lateral accesses and to the north a sundial on a pillar. Twin towers showing a neoclassical style on their curved pediments. The main front of the temple is in its entirety carved in pink quarry, which consists of three bodies and auction; In the first one the access is through an arch of half point with key of archangel; To the sides salomonic columns of vegetal reliefs and compound capital. In the lateral façades, the doorway of the accesses with a semicircular arch is highlighted, flanked by smooth columns that support entablature with broken fronton and florones at the sides.

== See also ==
- Roman Catholicism in Mexico
- Our Lady of the Assumption
