= Our Lady of the Assumption Cathedral, Lamego =

Coordinates: 41.0965°N 7.8068°W

Our Lady of the Assumption Cathedral
- Sé Catedral de Nossa Senhora da Assunção
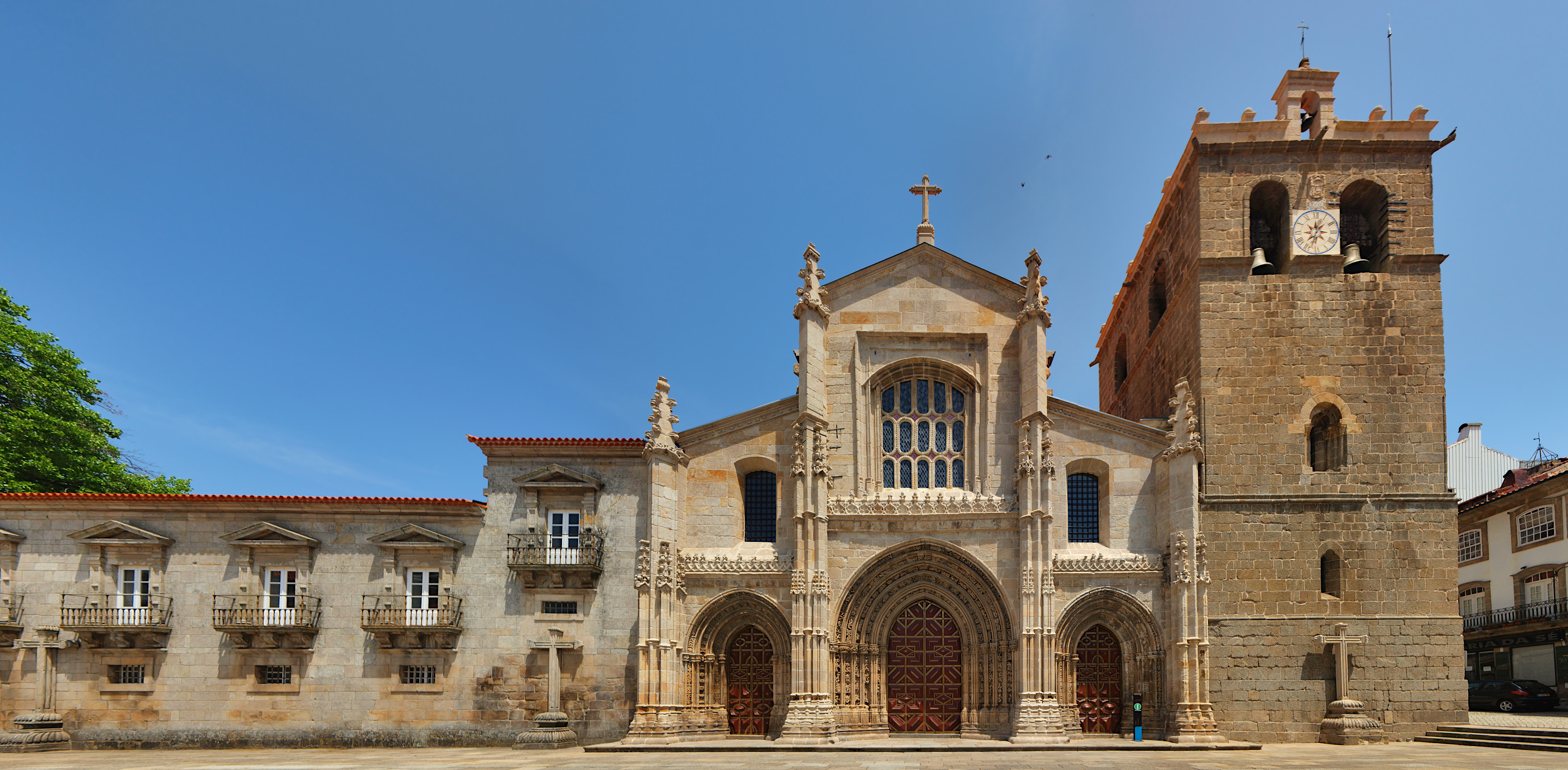
- Our Lady of the Assumption Cathedral
- Location: Lamego
- Country: Portugal
- Denomination: Roman Catholic Church

The Our Lady of the Assumption Cathedral (Portuguese: Sé Catedral de Nossa Senhora da Assunção) also called Lamego Cathedral is a religious building affiliated with the Catholic Church that was founded in 1129. It is located in the city of Portuguese city of Lamego

The temple follows the Roman or Latin rite and serves as the seat of the diocese of Lamego (Dioecesis Lamacensis or Diocese de Lamego) that was created about 570.

It is a cathedral built in Gothic style, which preserves the bell tower original square, but the rest of the architecture reflects the changes made in the sixteenth and eighteenth centuries, including a Renaissance cloister with a dozen arches and well proportioned.

== See also ==
- Roman Catholicism in Portugal
- Our Lady of the Assumption
