= Cathedral Basilica of Santiago de Cuba =

Coordinates: 20.0206°N 75.8294°W

Cathedral Basilica of Our Lady of the Assumption
- Catedral Basílica de Nuestra Señora de la Asunción
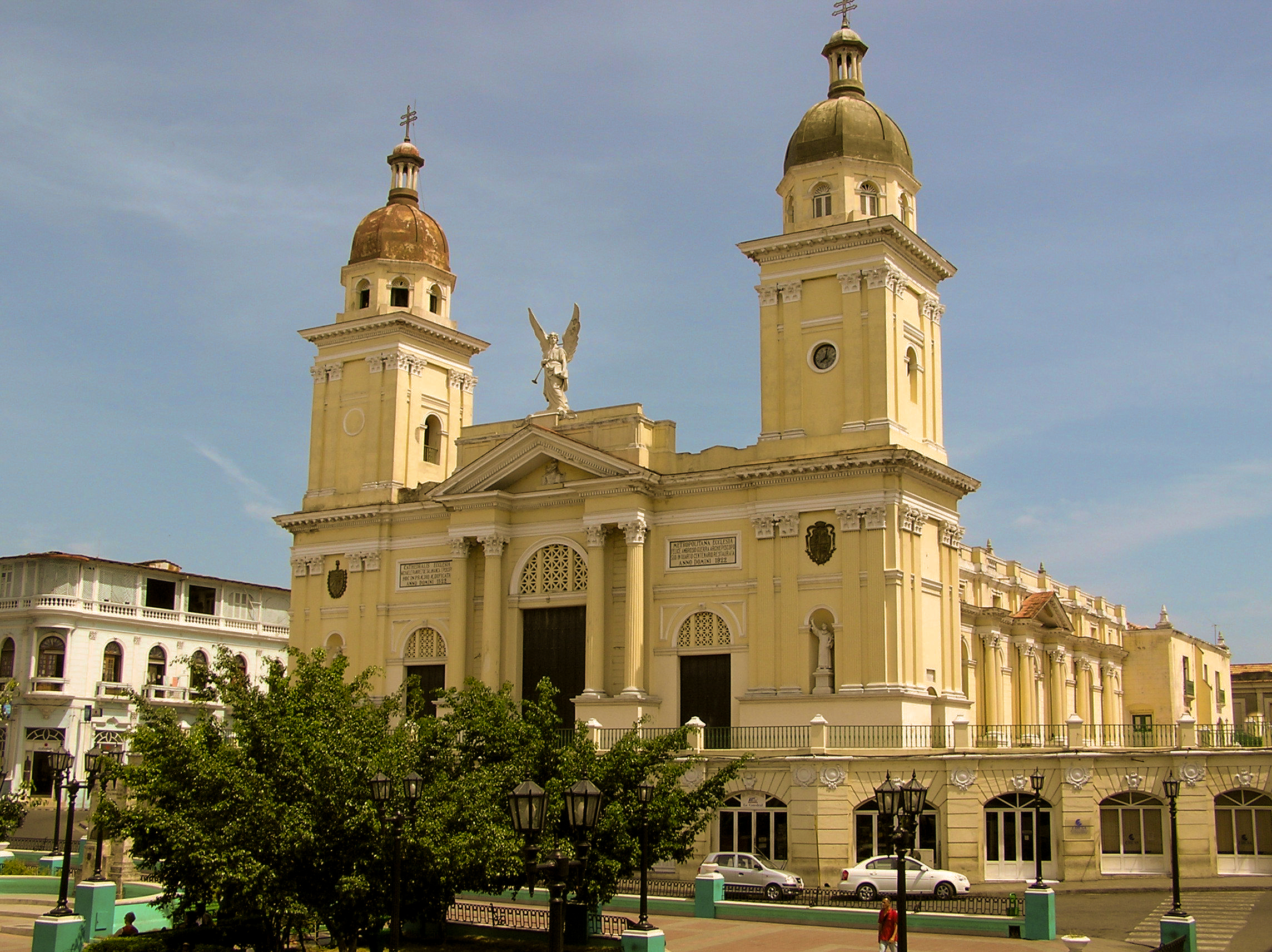
- Cathedral Basilica of Our Lady of the Assumption
- Location: Santiago de Cuba
- Country: Cuba
- Denomination: Roman Catholic Church

The Cathedral Basilica of Our Lady of the Assumption (Spanish: Catedral Basílica de Nuestra Señora de la Asunción), also called Santiago de Cuba Cathedral, is a Roman Catholic cathedral and minor basilica in Santiago de Cuba, in eastern Cuba. The cathedral fronts onto Céspedes Park. Its facade has two marble sculptures.

The first church in Santiago was built in 1514, at the beginning of the Spanish colonization of Cuba, and dedicated to Saint Catherine. This was a small, rudimentary chapel on a hill, the future site of the provincial prison. In 1522, this parish church, called Ermita de Santa Catalina, was elevated to the status of cathedral by Pope Adrian VI. Its construction ended in 1526. It was destroyed in the earthquakes of 1678, 1766, 1852 and 1932.

On 15 February 1882, it received the title of minor basilica from the Holy See. It became a national monument of Cuba in 1958. In the late 19th century, Juan Perpiñan y Pibernat presided over the Sacrament of Penance at the cathedral by royal decree from Spain.

== See also ==
- Roman Catholic Archdiocese of Santiago de Cuba
- Roman Catholicism in Cuba

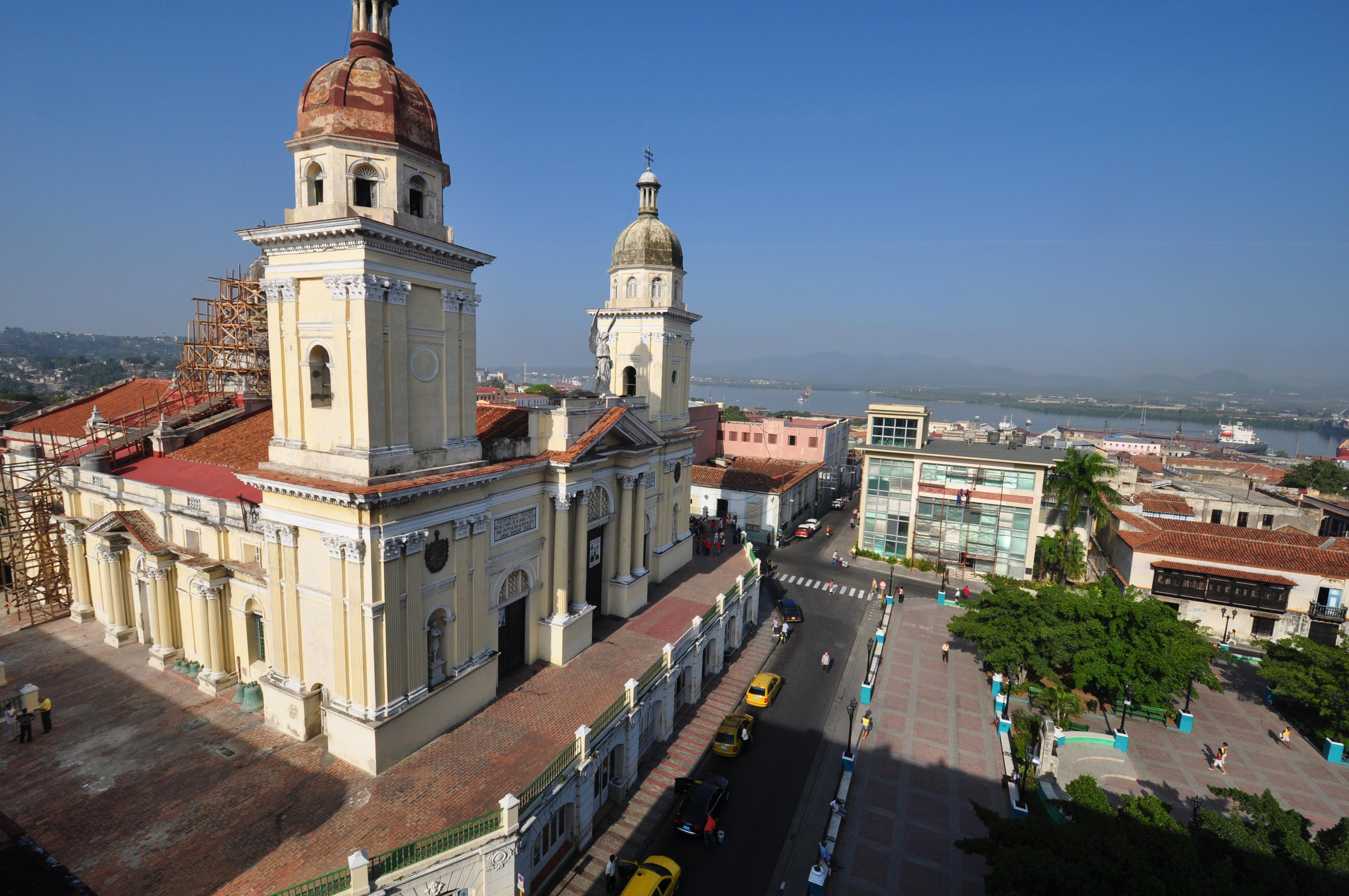
Another view
