= Our Lady of the Assumption Cathedral, Cap-Haïtien =

Coordinates: 19°45′40″N 72°12′03″W

Our Lady of the Assumption Cathedral
- Cathédrale Notre-Dame de l’Assomption
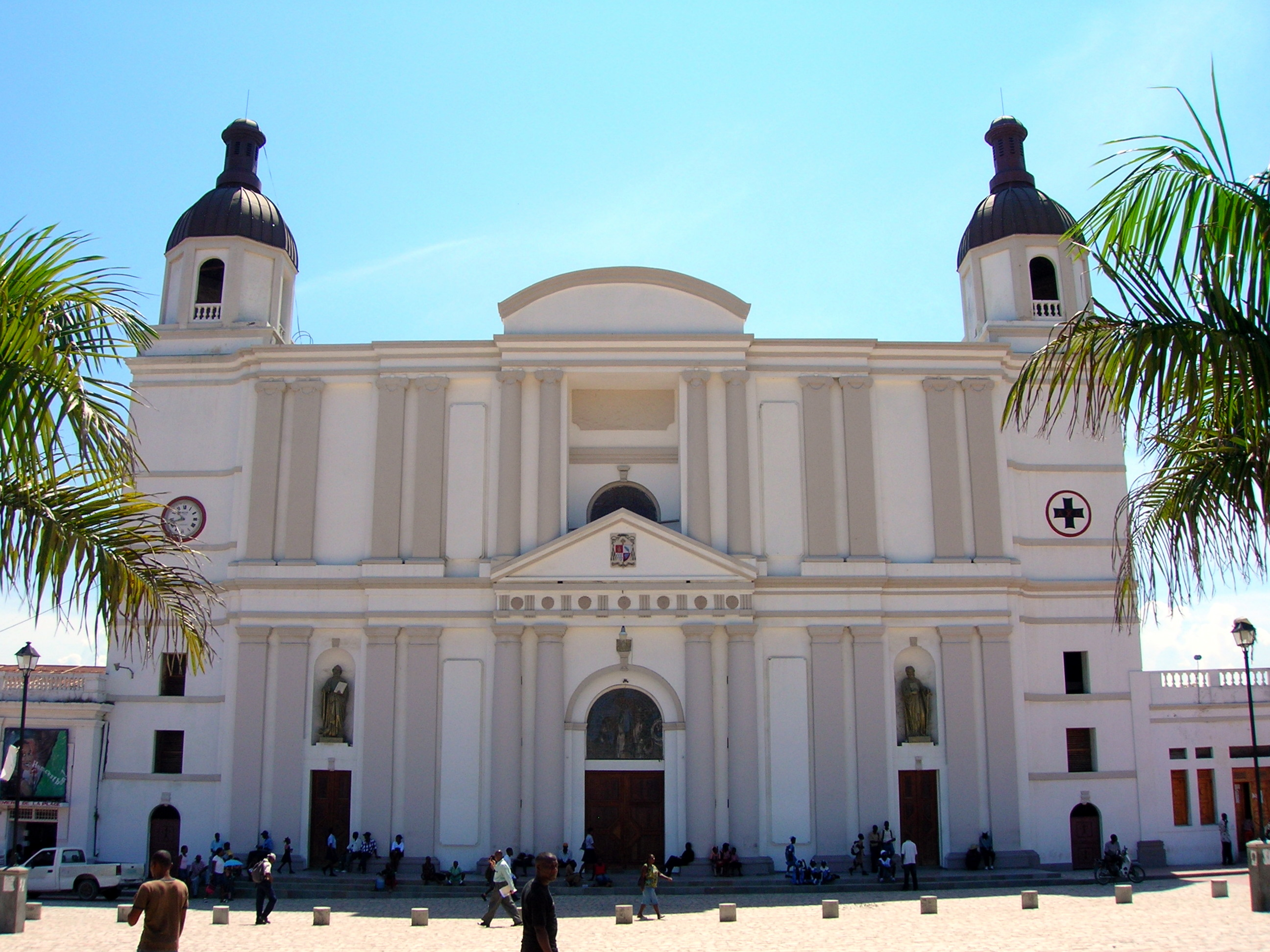
- Our Lady of the Assumption Cathedral
- Location: Cap-Haïtien
- Country: Haiti
- Denomination: Roman Catholic Church

The Our Lady of the Assumption Cathedral (French: Cathédrale Notre-Dame de l’Assomption ) also called Cap-Haïtien Cathedral Is the name that receives a temple affiliated to the Catholic Church that is located in the city of Cap-Haïtien in the Department of the North in the Hispaniola island and to the north of the Caribbean country of Haiti.

The present building dates from 1670, when Haiti was a colony of France and is a testimony of its presence in the Caribbean. In the square of the cathedral the liberation of the slaves was proclaimed the 29 of August 1793.

It was affected by an earthquake in 1842, and underwent considerable modifications between 1941 and 1942. In 2011 it was attacked by strangers and internal wreckage in monuments, the Vatican flag and the Blessed Sacrament, the police also found pamphlets of alleged groups Protestants. Pastor Sylvain Exantus, President of the Protestant Federation of Haiti, immediately condemned these acts. The cathedral was then closed for a short time.

The temple follows the Roman or Latin rite and is the mother church of the Metropolitan Archdiocese of Cape Haitian (Archidioecesis Capitis Haitiani) which was created as a diocese in 1861 by Pope Pius IX and raised its current status in 1988 through the bull "Qui pro Nostro" of Pope John Paul II.

It is under the pastoral responsibility of Bishop Max Leroy Mésidor.

== See also ==
- Roman Catholicism in Haiti
- Cathedral of Our Lady of the Assumption, Port-au-Prince

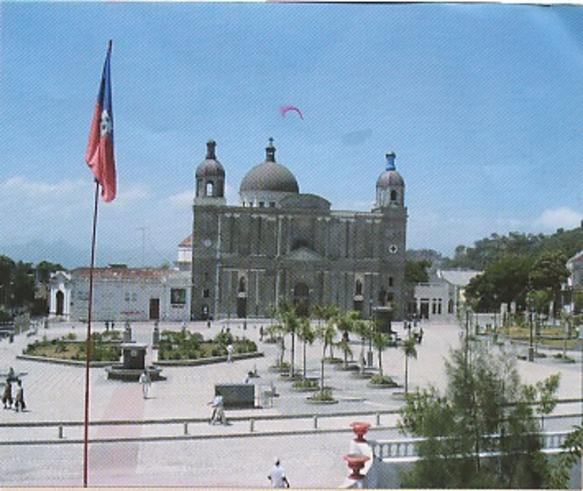
Another View
