= Church of the Assumption =

Church of the Assumption or Church of the Assumption of Mary may refer to:

== Belarus ==
- Church of the Assumption of the Blessed Virgin Mary, Budslaw
- Church of the Assumption, Dzyatlava
- Church of the Assumption of the Blessed Virgin Mary, Mstsislaw
- Church of the Assumption of the Blessed Virgin Mary, Pruzhany

== Belgium ==
- Church of the Assumption of Our Lady, Zottegem

== Bosnia and Herzegovina ==
- Church of the Assumption, Jajce
- Church of the Assumption of the Blessed Virgin Mary, Uskoplje

== Bulgaria ==
- Church of the Assumption (Uzundzhovo)

== China ==
- Church of the Assumption, Shanghai

== Croatia ==
- Church of the Assumption of the Blessed Virgin Mary (Crikvenica)
- Church of the Assumption of the Blessed Virgin Mary, Zagreb (Brezovica)

== Czech Republic ==
- Church of the Assumption of Our Lady and Saint John the Baptist, Kutná Hora
- Church of the Assumption of the Virgin Mary (Most)
- Church of the Assumption of the Virgin Mary and St. Charles the Great, Prague

== France ==
- Notre-Dame-de-l'Assomption, Paris

== Germany ==
- Church of the Assumption of the Blessed Virgin Mary, Frauenau

== Haiti ==
- Cathedral of Our Lady of the Assumption, Port-au-Prince

== Ireland ==
- Church of the Assumption, Booterstown, Dublin
- Church of the Assumption, Howth, Dublin

== Israel ==
- Tomb of the Virgin Mary

== Italy ==
- Our Lady of the Assumption Church, Caselle Landi
- Santa Maria Assunta, Galzignano Terme
- Santa Maria Assunta, Genoa
- Santa Maria della Scala, Milan
- Church of the Assumption of Mary, Riola di Vergato

== Latvia ==
- Basilica of the Assumption, Aglona
- Assumption of Our Lady Church, Bolderāja

== Lithuania ==
- Church of Vytautas the Great, Kaunas (Vytautas the Great's Church of the Assumption of the Holy Virgin Mary)
- Church of the Assumption of the Blessed Virgin Mary, Palanga
- Church of the Assumption of the Blessed Virgin Mary into Heaven, Telšiai
- Church of the Assumption of the Blessed Virgin Mary, Vilnius

== Malaysia ==
- Church of the Assumption (Penang)

== Malta ==
- Parish Church of St Mary, Attard (Parish Church of the Assumption)
- St Mary's Chapel, Bir Miftuħ (Medieval Chapel of the Assumption of Mary)
- Parish Church of St Mary, Birkirkara (Parish Church of the Assumption of Mary)
- Parish Church of the Assumption, Dingli
- St Mary's Church, Għaxaq (Parish Church of the Assumption of Mary)
- Cathedral of the Assumption, Victoria
- St Mary's Church, Gudja (Archpresbyterial and Archmatrix Church of the Assumption of Mary)
- Parish Church of the Assumption of the Blessed Virgin Mary into Heaven, Mġarr
- Rotunda of Mosta (Sanctuary Basilica of the Assumption of Our Lady)
- St Mary's Church, Mqabba (Parish Church of the Assumption of Mary)
- Parish Church of the Assumption, Qrendi
- Tal-Virtù Church (Church of the Assumption of Mary of tal-Virtù)
- Santa Marija Chapel, Żabbar (Church of the Assumption of Mary)
- Parish Church of the Assumption of Mary, Żebbuġ
- Chapel of St Mary of Ħal Tmin, Żejtun (Chapel of the Assumption of the Virgin Mary)
- St Mary's Church, Żurrieq (Church of the Assumption of Mary)

== Moldova ==
- Assumption of Our Lady Church, Căușeni

== Morocco ==
- Church of the Assumption (El Jadida)

== Nepal ==
- Assumption of the Blessed Virgin Mary Cathedral, Kathmandu

== Poland ==
- Church of the Assumption of the Blessed Virgin Mary, Bielawa
- Poor Clares' Church, Bydgoszcz
- Church of the Assumption of the Blessed Virgin Mary, Chełmno
- Sanctuary of Our Lady of Dzików (Dominican Church and Convent of the Assumption of the Blessed Virgin Mary)
- St. Mary's Church, Gdańsk
- Collegiate Church of the Assumption of the Blessed Virgin Mary, Głogów
- Church of the Assumption with Saints Catherine and Florian, Gołąb
- St. Mary's Church, Gryfice
- Assumption of Holy Mary Church, Haczów
- Church of the Assumption, Kłodzko
- Church of the Assumption of Mary, Koryciny
- Church of the Assumption, Camaldolese Priory, Kraków
- Church of the Assumption of the Blessed Virgin Mary, Kraków
- Sanctuary of Our Lady of Ludźmierz (Basilica of the Assumption of the Blessed Virgin Mary)
- Church of the Assumption and St Stanislaus, Mogiła Abbey
- Church of the Assumption of the Blessed Virgin and St Anthony of Padua, Milejów
- Church of Our Lady, Sławno (Church of the Assumption of the Blessed Virgin Mary)
- Church of the Assumption of the Blessed Virgin Mary (Tuczno)
- Carmelite Church, Warsaw (Church of the Assumption of the Blessed Virgin Mary and St. Joseph)
- Assumption of the Blessed Virgin Mary Church, Żagań

== Romania ==
- Assumption of Our Lady Church, Balotești
- Assumption of Mary Church, Iași

== Russia ==
- Church of the Assumption (Aksay)
- Church of the Assumption of the Virgin (Alikovo)
- Church of the Assumption of Mary (Astrakhan)
- Church of Our Lady of the Assumption, Irkutsk
- Church of the Assumption, Nedvigovka
- Church of the Assumption of the Blessed Virgin Mary (Trinity-Lykov)

== Serbia ==
- Church of the Assumption of Mary, Apatin
- Church of the Assumption of Mary, Čelarevo
- Church of the Assumption of the Theotokos, Pančevo
- Church of the Assumption of the Theotokos, Vršac
- Church of the Assumption, Zrenjanin

== Slovakia ==
- Church of the Assumption of the Virgin Mary, Košice
- Church of the Assumption of the Virgin Mary, Plavecký Štvrtok
- Assumption of Mary Church (Rožňava)
- Church of the Assumption of the Virgin Mary, Staré

== Slovenia ==
- Assumption of Mary Parish Church (Dekani)
- Church of the Assumption of the Virgin Mary and Roch (Jesenice)

== Spain ==
- Church of la Asunción (Albacete)
- Church of la Asunción (Almansa)
- Church of La Asunción (Brea de Tajo)
- Church of la Asunción (Galapagar)
- Church of la Asunción (Hellín)
- Church of la Asunción (Letur)

== Ukraine ==
- Church of the Assumption, Bishche
- Church of the Assumption, Buchach
- Church of the Assumption, Chervonohorod
- Church of the Assumption, Monastyryska
- Church of the Assumption, Slavsko
- Church of the Assumption, Yazlovets

== United Kingdom ==
- Church of the Assumption of the Blessed Virgin Mary, Hartwell
- Church of the Assumption of the Blessed Virgin Mary, Redenhall
- Church of the Assumption of Our Lady, Torquay

== United States ==
- Holy Assumption of the Virgin Mary Church, Kenai, Alaska
- Church of the Assumption of the Blessed Virgin Mary (Washington, D.C.)
- Church of the Assumption (Pocatello, Idaho)
- Saint Mary of the Assumption Church (Chicago), Illinois
- Church of the Assumption and Rectory, Topeka, Kansas
- St. Mary's Assumption Church (New Orleans, Louisiana)
- Church of the Assumption of the Blessed Virgin Mary (Plattenville, Louisiana)
- Saint Mary of the Assumption Church, Rectory, School and Convent, Brookline, Massachusetts
- Assumption of the Blessed Virgin Mary Church, Detroit, Michigan
- Church of the Assumption (Phoenix, Michigan)
- Church of the Assumption (Saint Paul, Minnesota)
- Assumption of the Blessed Virgin Mary Parish Historic District, Jamestown, Missouri
- Church of the Assumption (New York City), New York
- Assumption of the Blessed Virgin Mary Ukrainian Catholic Church (Centralia), Pennsylvania
- Church of the Assumption (Nashville, Tennessee)
- St. Mary of the Assumption Church (Fort Worth), Texas
- St. Mary's Church of the Assumption (Praha, Texas)

== See also ==
- Our Lady of the Assumption Church (disambiguation)
- St. Mary of the Assumption Church (disambiguation)
- St. Mary's Assumption Church (disambiguation)
- Basilica of the Assumption (disambiguation)
- Cathedral of the Assumption (disambiguation)
- Cathedral of Our Lady of the Assumption (disambiguation)
- Church of la Asunción (disambiguation)
- Church of Nuestra Señora de la Asunción (disambiguation)
- List of churches consecrated to Santa Maria Assunta
- Church of the Dormition (disambiguation)
