= Church of la Asunción =

Church of la Asunción or Church of La Asunción may refer to:

- Church of la Asunción (Albacete)
- Church of la Asunción (Almansa)
- Church of La Asunción (Brea de Tajo)
- Church of la Asunción (Galapagar)
- Church of la Asunción (Hellín)
- Church of la Asunción (Letur)
