= Brea de Tajo =

- Municipality
- Flag Coat of arms

- Map of Brea de Tajo in Madrid

- Location in Spain
- Coordinates: 40°13′45″N 3°6′40″W
- Country: Spain
- Autonomous community: Community of Madrid
- Province: Madrid
- Comarca: Comarca de Las Vegas

Area
  - Total: 44.33 km^{2} (17.12 sq mi)

Population (2025-01-01)
  - Total: 577
  - Density: 13.0/km^{2} (33.7/sq mi)
- Demonym: Breanos
- Time zone: UTC+1 (CET)
  - Summer (DST): UTC+2 (CEST)

Brea de Tajo (Spanish pronunciation: [ˈbɾe.a ðe ˈta.xo]) is a municipality of the autonomous community of Madrid in central Spain. It belongs to the comarca of Las Vegas.

Sights include the church of La Asunción.
