= Church of the Assumption of the Blessed Virgin Mary, Bielawa =

Church in Bielawa, Poland

Coordinates: 50.6872°N 16.6165°E

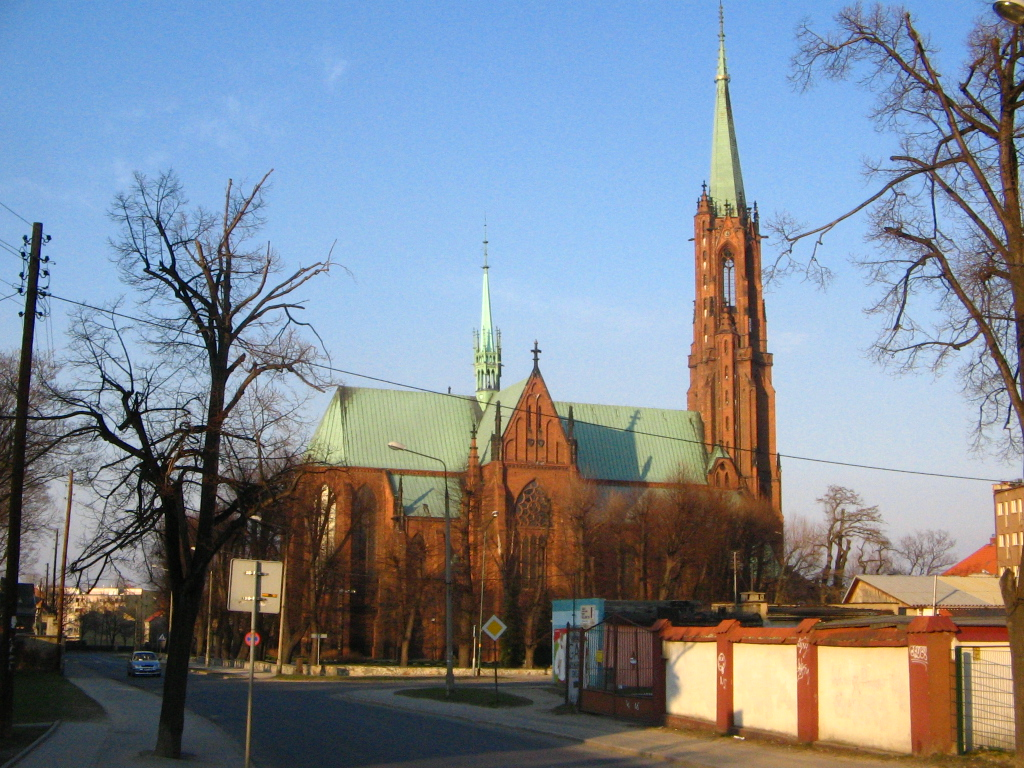

The Church of the Assumption of the Blessed Virgin Mary is a Roman Catholic parish church belonging to the Bielawa deanery of the Diocese of Świdnica.

== History ==
The temple was built in the years 1868–1876 in the neo-gothic style according to the design of architect Alexis Langer from Wrocław. On November 15, 1876, the dean of Dzierżoniów, Adolf Rinke, consecrated the new church. The ceremony was presided over by the new parish priest, Father Karol Stein. As a personal gift to the new temple, the priest. Franciszek Krauze donated a 30-voice organ, which is still used today. In 1892, Cardinal Georg Kopp consecrated the temple. It is a three-nave building, on a cruciform plan, with a tower height of 101 meters. The interior furnishings were made in the neo-gothic style. The image of the Blessed Virgin Mary of the Assumption placed in the main altar, painted on canvas, was made in 1913.

In 1961–1966 the roof, both towers, windows and organs were renovated. The floor was replaced and the interior was painted. The new polychrome was consecrated by Bishop Wincenty Urban on October 29, 1966. In 1976, the roof together with the large tower was covered with copper sheet. In 1992, the cathedral altar and rood screen in the neo-gothic style were made. In 1992–1993 the tower and the temple were grouted. In 1993, the organ underwent a major renovation, and in 1994 a new sound system was installed. In 1996, a new lightning protection system was installed and the floor under the benches was renovated. In 1996–1997, downpipes were installed and the roof flashing was made. In 1995, the boiler room was modernized and gas heating was installed. A pipeline was brought to the sacristy together with water. In 1996, the roof was renovated. In 1997, the steel aquifer pipes were replaced by copper pipes. In 1998, three bells were ordered which were mounted on the tower after consecration. In 1999, the heating system was replaced. In 2000, the clocks were installed on the tower and the external lighting of the temple was made.
