= Church of the Assumption, Nedvigovka =

Church of the Assumption
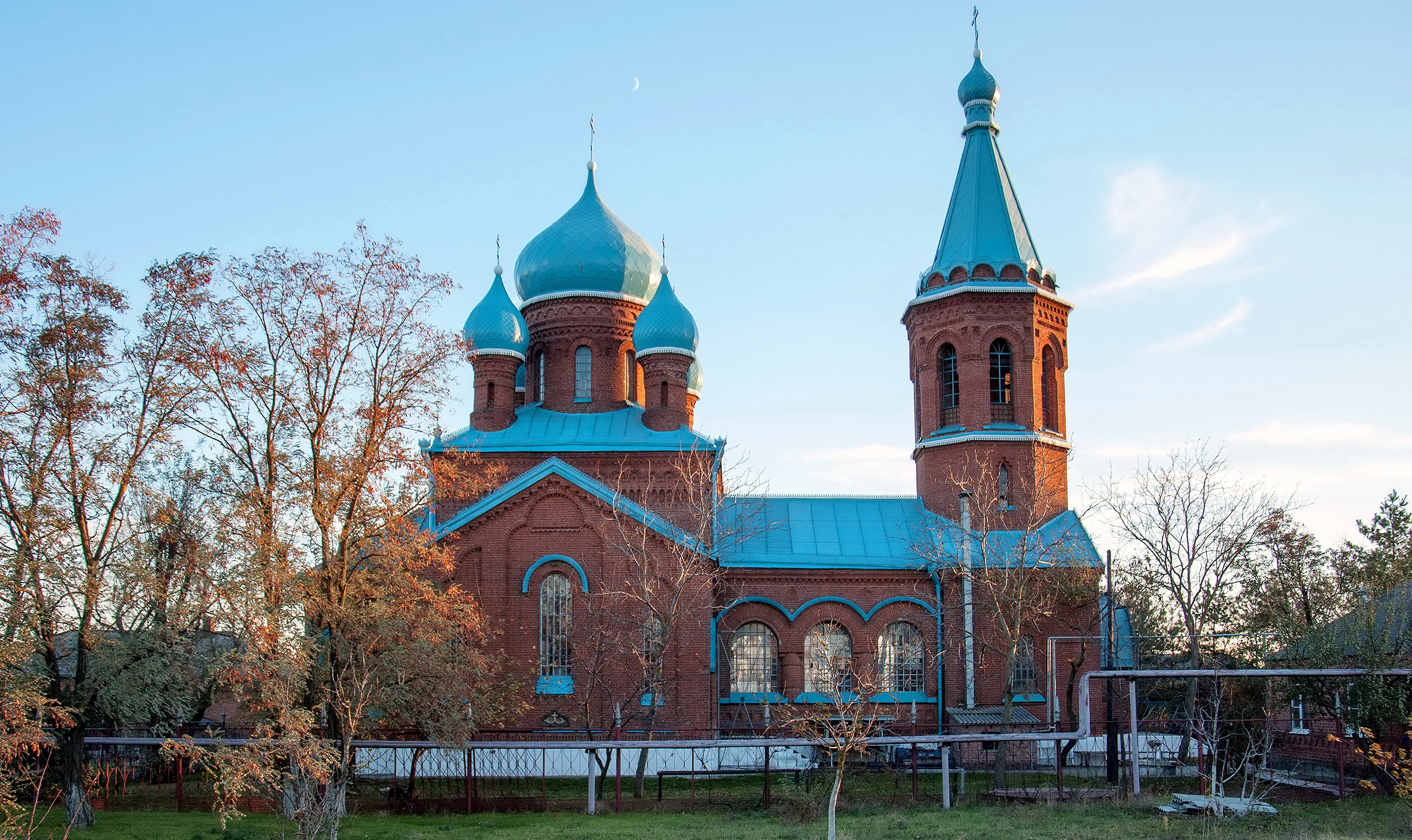

Religion
- Affiliation: Russian Orthodox

Location
- Location: Nedvigovka, Rostov Oblast Russia 47.2689°N 39.3597°E
- Interactive map of Church of the Assumption

Architecture
- Style: Eclecticism
- Completed: 1914

Church of the Assumption (Russian: Церковь Успения Богородицы) is a Russian Orthodox church in the village of Nedvigovka, Rostov Oblast, Russia. It belongs to the Diocese of Rostov and Novocherkassk. Erected in the early 20th century, it is considered to be an object of Russian cultural heritage.

== History ==
The first Church of the Assumption in Nedvigovka was built back in 1796. Its walls were made of stone, and the dome and bell tower were wooden. Over time it decayed and in 1905 it was decided to build a new church to replace the old one under the same name and at the same place. The architect is unknown, but, presumably, construction works were carried out under the project of V. N. Vasilyev. The main construction works were finished in 1914.

In 1937 the church was closed and looted, church library and archives were burned, Abbot Ioann Zagravsky was arrested and exiled to Siberia. In 1943, during the German occupation, the church was reopened.

== Exterior ==
The church is an example of red-brick Eclecticism. It has the elements of ancient architecture, and of modernism (in particular, large semicircular window openings of the refectory). The building has a cruciform appearance, five onion domes covered with tent are strictly proportional. The bell tower is attached directly to the church building and is located at its western entrance.
