= Church of Our Lady of the Assumption, Irkutsk =

Coordinates: 52.2904°N 104.2826°E

Church of Our Lady of the Assumption
- костёл во имя Успения Пресвятой Девы Марии
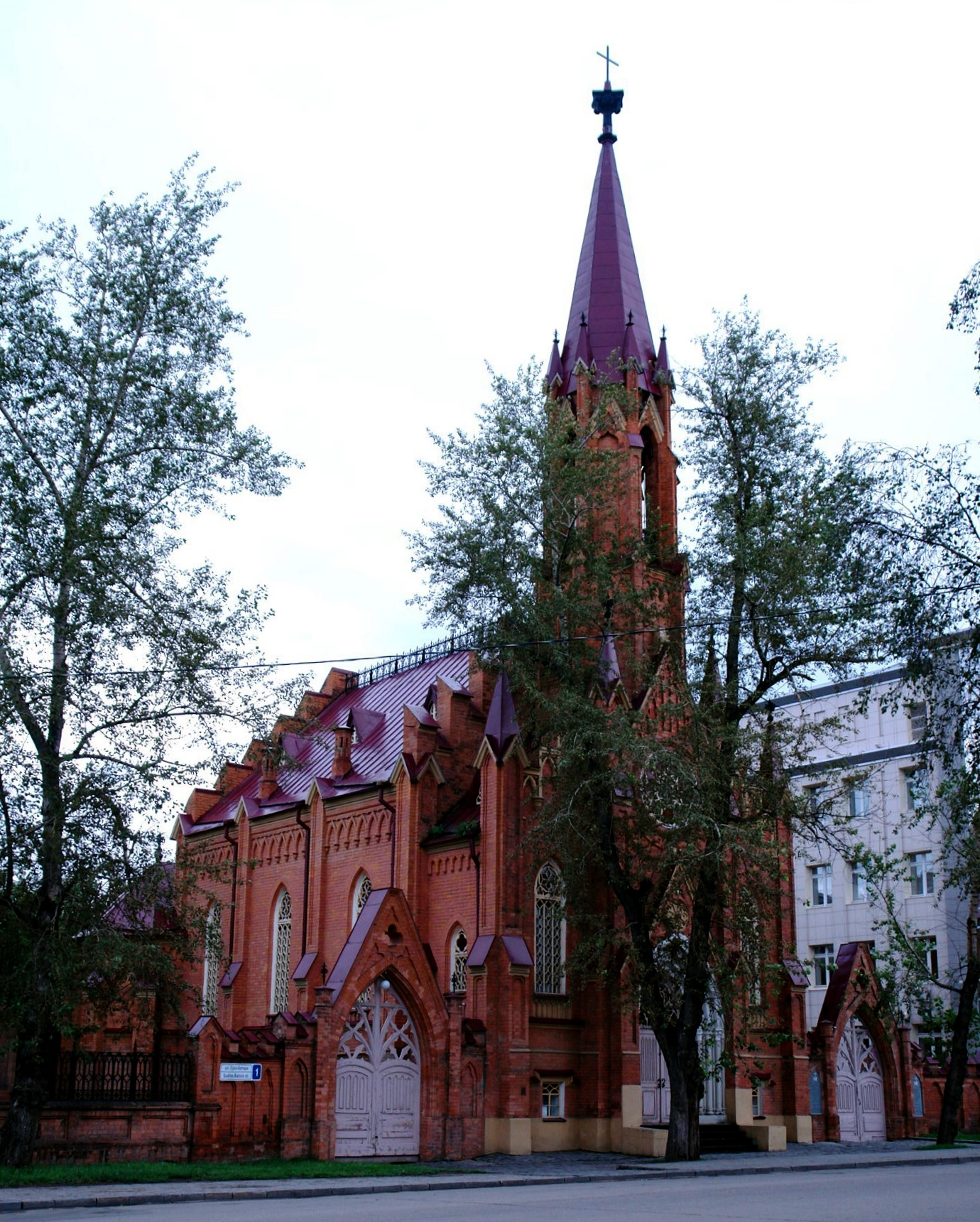
- Church of Our Lady of the Assumption
- Location: Irkutsk
- Country: Russia
- Denomination: Roman Catholic Church

The Church of Our Lady of the Assumption (Russian: костёл во имя Успения Пресвятой Девы Марии) also called the Polish Church, it is a Catholic church in Gothic style located in Irkutsk, in Siberia, Russia.

A first small wooden church and catholic was built in 1825 in Irkutsk by Catholic settlers. It was enlarged in 1855, but burned down in the great fire of the city in July 1879. A new brick structure is built by the Polish community between 1881 and 1883 dedicated to the Assumption of the Virgin Mary. Its neo-Gothic style differs from the Orthodox churches in the shape of the dome, like The Savior, which is nearby. It was done according to the plans of the Polish architect Jan Tamulewicz and the interior was decorated by Wojciech Koperski. The altarpiece is from 1868. A new harmonium was brought from the United States in 1896.

== See also ==
- Roman Catholicism in Russia
- Our Lady of the Assumption

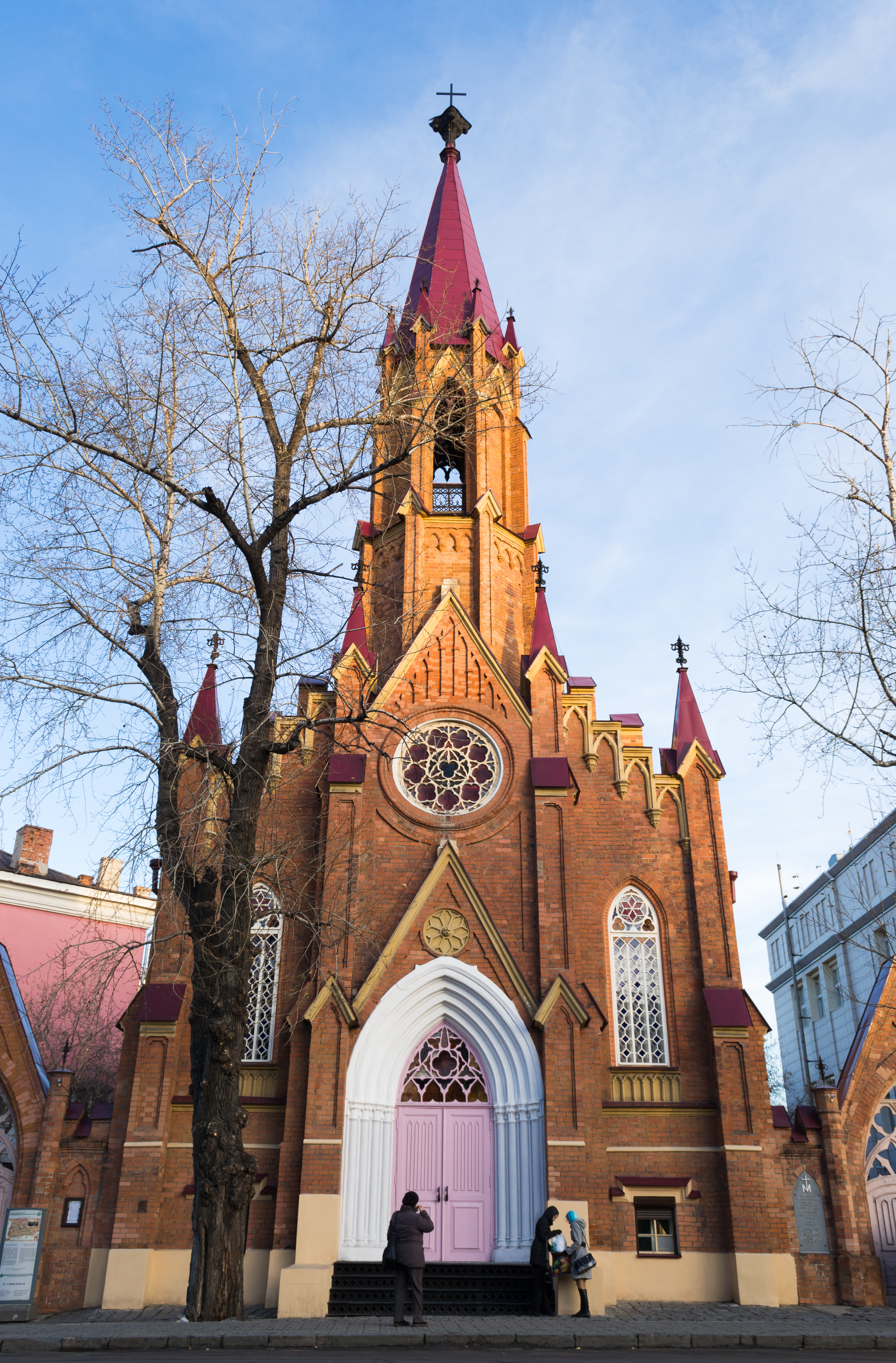
Another View
