= Church of the Assumption of the Blessed Virgin Mary, Uskoplje =

Church of the Assumption of the Blessed Virgin Mary
- Crkva Uznesenja Blažene Djevice Marije
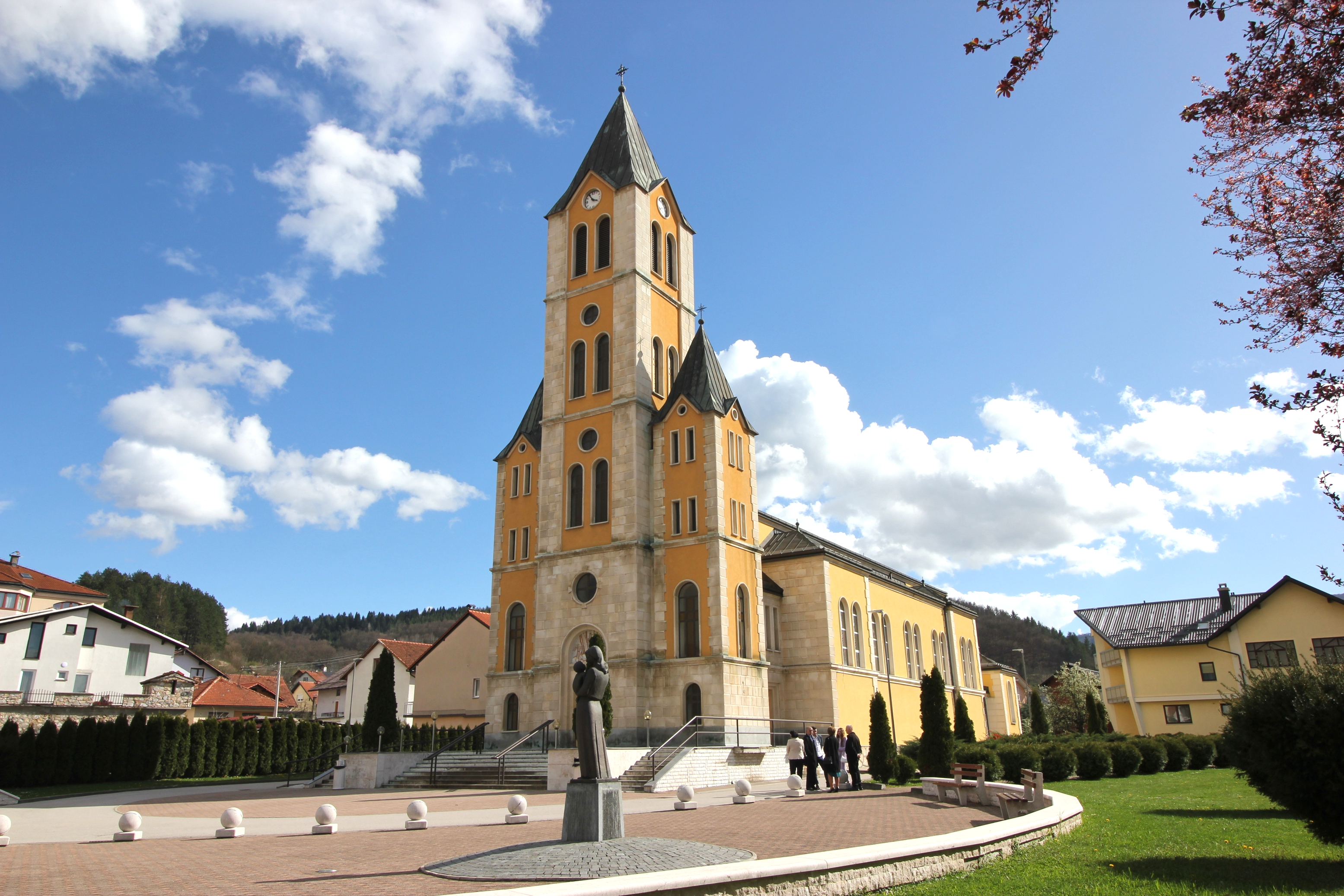
- Church of the Assumption of the Blessed Virgin Mary
- 43°56′19″N 17°34′56″E
- Location: Gornji Vakuf-Uskoplje
- Country: Bosnia and Herzegovina
- Denomination: Roman Catholic

History
- Status: Parish church

Architecture
- Functional status: Active
- Architect: Karlo Pařik
- Groundbreaking: 1928
- Completed: 1931

Administration
- Archdiocese: Archdiocese of Vrhbosna
- Archdeaconry: Archdeaconry of Guča Gora
- Deanery: Deanery of Bugojno
- Parish: Parish of the Assumption of the Blessed Virgin Mary - Uskoplje

Clergy
- Archbishop: Vinko Puljić
- Dean: The Very Rev.Pero Pranjić
- Priest: Vinko Marković O.F.M.

The Church of the Assumption of the Blessed Virgin Mary (Croatian: Crkva Uznesenja Blažene Djevice Marije) is a Roman Catholic church in Gornji Vakuf-Uskoplje, Bosnia and Herzegovina.

== See also ==
- Catholic Church in Bosnia and Herzegovina
