= Parish Church of the Assumption, Mġarr =

Parish Church of the Assumption of the Blessed Virgin Mary into Heaven
- Knisja Parrokkjali ta' Santa Marija Assunta
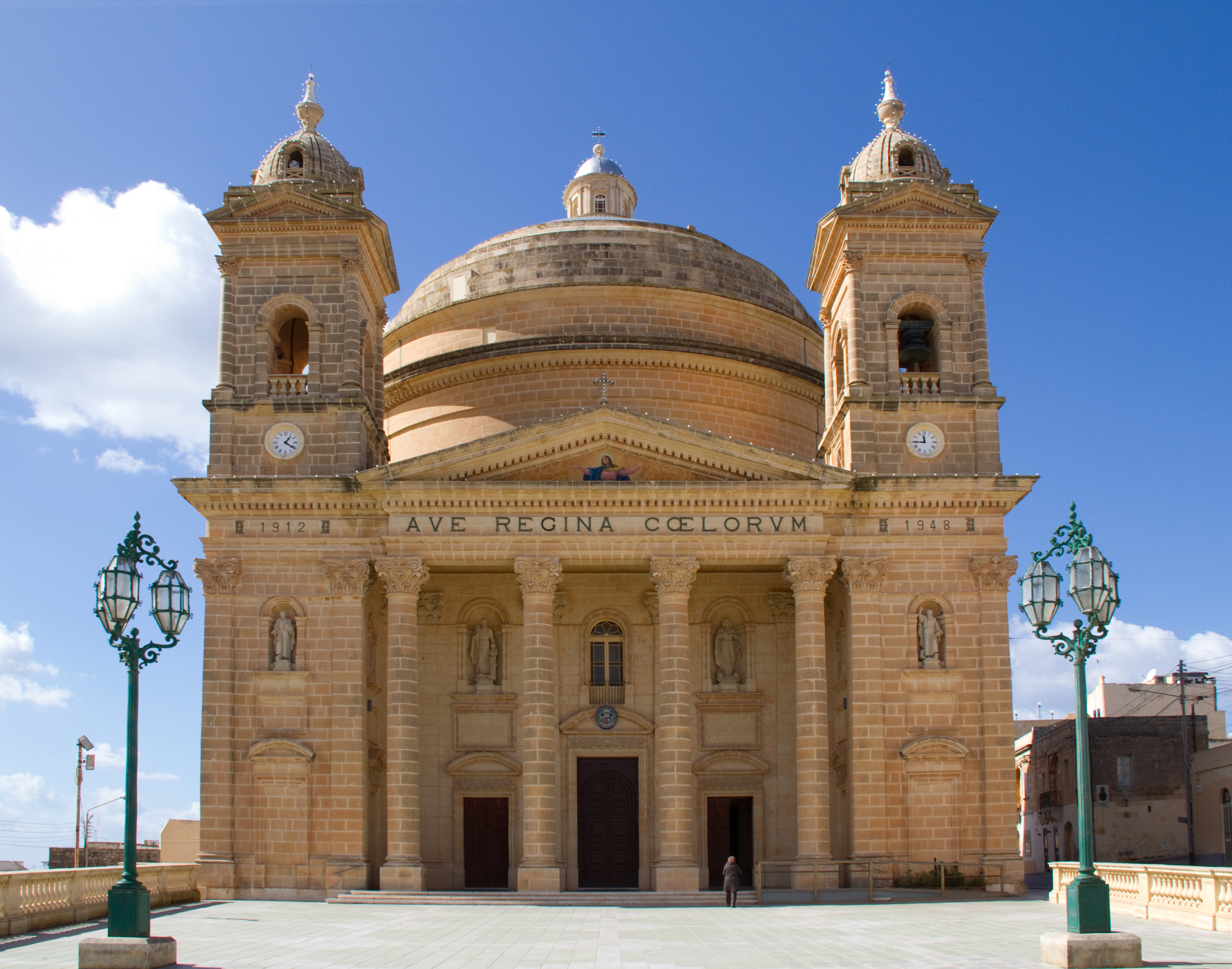
- The church's façade in 2012
- Parish Church of the Assumption of the Blessed Virgin Mary into Heaven
- 35°55′10.3″N 14°21′58.0″E
- Location: Mġarr, Malta
- Denomination: Roman Catholic

History
- Status: Parish church
- Founded: c. 1400 (first church)
- Dedication: Assumption of Mary
- Consecrated: 13 August 1939

Architecture
- Functional status: Active
- Style: Neoclassical
- Years built: 1912–1946

Specifications
- Materials: Limestone

Administration
- Archdiocese: Malta
- Parish: Mġarr Parish (Parroċċa tal-Imġarr)

The Parish Church of the Assumption of the Blessed Virgin Mary into Heaven (Maltese: Knisja Parrokkjali ta' Santa Marija Assunta) is a Roman Catholic parish church in Mġarr, Malta, dedicated to the Assumption of Mary. It was constructed between 1912 and 1946 on the site of an earlier church which had existed since around 1400. The building has a large dome with an elliptical plan; this shape is said to have been chosen because of its similarity to an egg, so as to encourage residents to sell eggs to raise funds for its construction.

== History ==
A small church dedicated to the Assumption of Mary was established in Mġarr in around 1400, and it was repaired in 1600. The village formed part of the parish of the Cathedral of Malta until it became a separate parish on 12 October 1898. The old church therefore became a parish church, but residents wanted to build a new and larger church in its place. Parish priest Girolamo Chetcuti organised a campaign to raise funds for the new church, and he purchased the land on which the building was constructed.

The first stone of the building was laid down on 2 June 1912. The new church was constructed around the old one, which was demolished in 1918. Several masons and master builders were involved in the church's design and construction. The initial plans were drawn up by Ġammri Camilleri, who also oversaw the roofing of the sacristy and some of the chapels together with the builder Indri Deguara. Ċensu Galea oversaw the initial stages of construction, and the plans of the dome were drawn up by Ġiomaria Camilleri and Ġanni A. Cilia. Camilleri oversaw the construction of the dome. The residents of Mġarr contributed to the church's construction by providing labour and by selling eggs, fruit and livestock to raise funds.

When the building was still under construction, part of it was temporarily roofed over to allow Mass to be celebrated inside. Between 1933 and 1935, through the efforts of parish priest Edgar Salomone a number of buildings were expropriated by the government and they were demolished in order to make way for a public square and a parvis in front of the church. Two bells were installed in the belfries on 1 September 1935. The almost-completed church was blessed on 13 August 1939 by Girolamo Chetcuti, but construction halted soon afterwards because of World War II. The dome's lantern and the upper levels of the belfries were designed by Ġużeppi Damato, and construction of these began on 25 February 1946. The building was completed later that year.

== Architecture ==
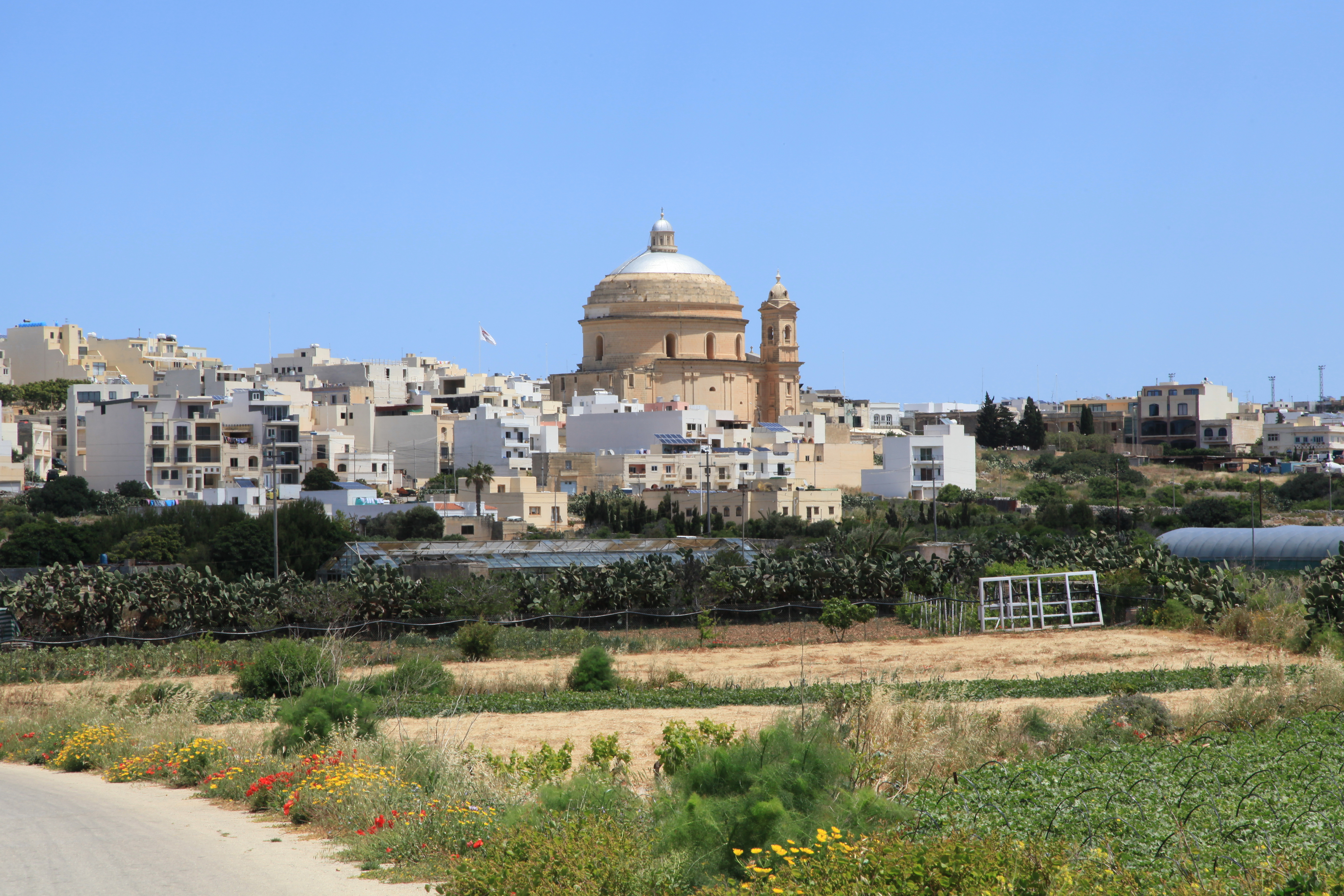
The church's dome which dominates the Mġarr skyline

The church has a neoclassical design which bears similarities to the Rotunda of Mosta, which is in turn based on the Pantheon in Rome. Contrasting with the Mosta church's circular dome, the cupola of Mġarr church is elliptical, and this unusual shape resembling an egg is said to have been chosen to encourage residents to sell eggs in order to fund its construction.

The church has two bell towers and a large dome which is painted silver, and the latter dominates the village's skyline. Internally, the church contains seven altars.

== Artworks ==
The church's altarpiece was painted by Lazzaro Pisani, and the building also contains a number of paintings by Ramiro and Guido Calì. Another painting of the Virgin Mary by Pisani which was located in the old church is now found in the sacristy.

The church's titular statue of the Assumption of Mary was purchased from Paris, and some other statues located in the church were purchased from Rome or Lecce in Italy. The church also includes some statues made by the Gozitan sculptor Wistin Camilleri.
