= Church of the Assumption of the Blessed Virgin Mary, Zagreb (Brezovica) =

Church of the Assumption of the Blessed Virgin Mary (Croatian: Župna crkva uznesenja Blažene Djevice Marije)
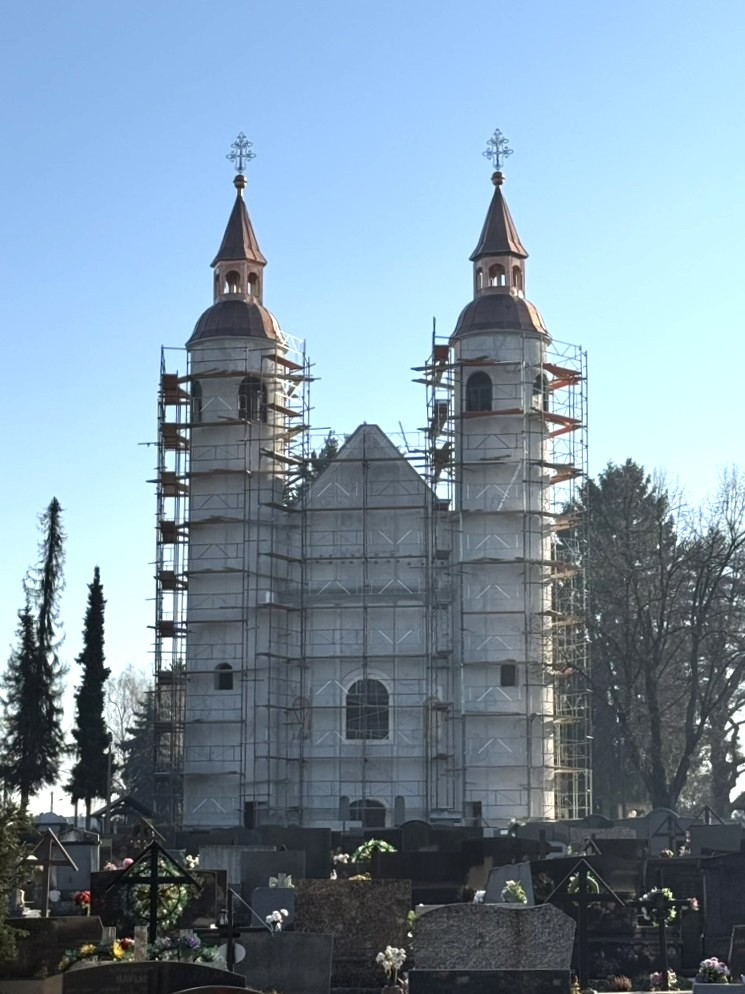
- Church in 2025
- Church of the Assumption of the Blessed Virgin Mary (Croatian: Župna crkva uznesenja Blažene Djevice Marije)
- 45°43′57″N 15°53′49″E
- Location: Zagreb
- Country: Croatia
- Denomination: Roman Catholic

Architecture
- Functional status: Active
- Style: Baroque
- Completed: 1756

Church of the Assumption of the Blessed Virgin Mary, Zagreb (Brezovica) (Croatian: Župna crkva uznesenja Blažene Djevice Marije u Brezovici) is a Catholic parish church located in the neighbourhood Brezovica of Zagreb, Croatia. The church was built in 1756.

== History ==
The parish church was built on the site of an earlier wooden church, which dates back to the founding of the parish in the 14th century. The construction of the new church was organised and financed by the noble family Drašković, who were the patrons of the parish. The church bell towers were completed in 1768.

In 1906 a new rectory was built. Throughout its history, the church has been renovated several times. The sanctuary was thoroughly renovated in 2016, and the new altar was consecrated in June of the same year. The facade of the church was last renovated in 2018.

During the earthquake that struck Zagreb and Sisak-Moslavina County on 29 December 2020, the church suffered significant damage, especially to the bell towers and interior, causing it to be temporarily closed.

== Architecture and artwork ==
The church was built in the Baroque style, with a distinctive semicircular shape and two slender, cylindrical bell towers. The construction of the church was organised and financed by the noble Drašković family. The design of the church was chosen by Josip Kazimir Drašković, who organised the execution of the works, secured the delivery of materials and financed the construction. The church's bell towers were completed at the initiative of his son Ivan Drašković. In 1771 the church received a new organ.

The church houses the main altar of the Assumption of the Blessed Virgin Mary, and three additional altars dedicated to St. Anthony of Padua, St. Barbara and St. Vitus the Martyr. The main altar and pulpit, made in 1762, are masterpieces of Baroque sculpture, the work of the sculptor Franjo Straub, and are included among the top achievements of Croatian Baroque sculpture.

== Galerija ==
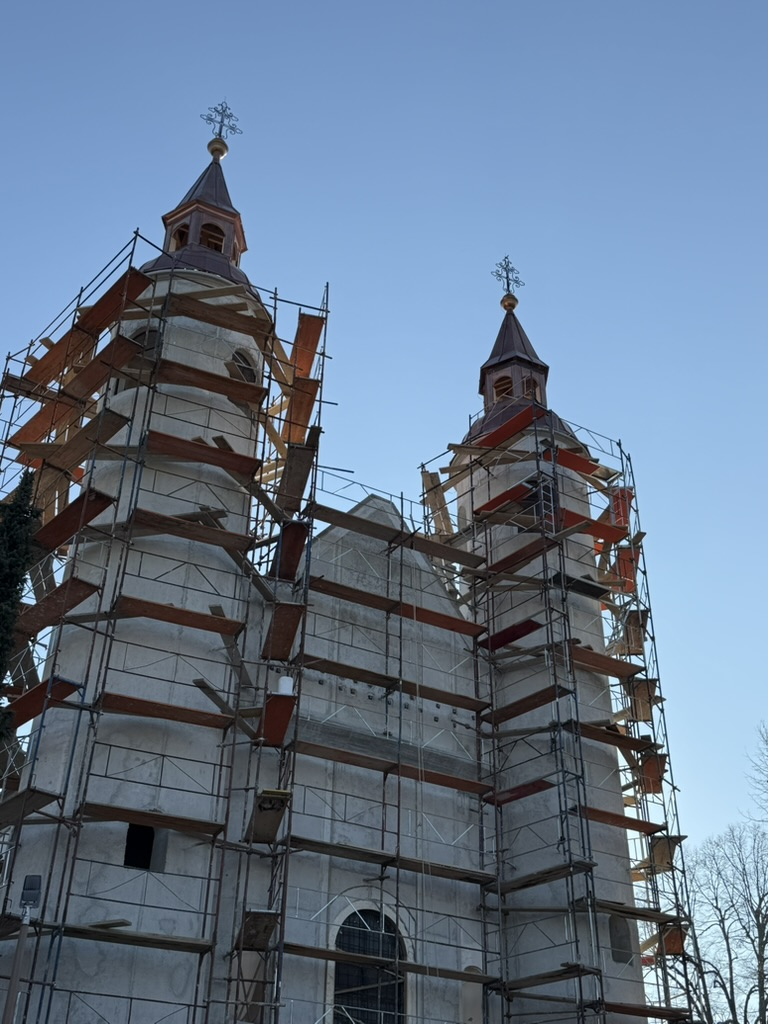
View of the church, January 2025

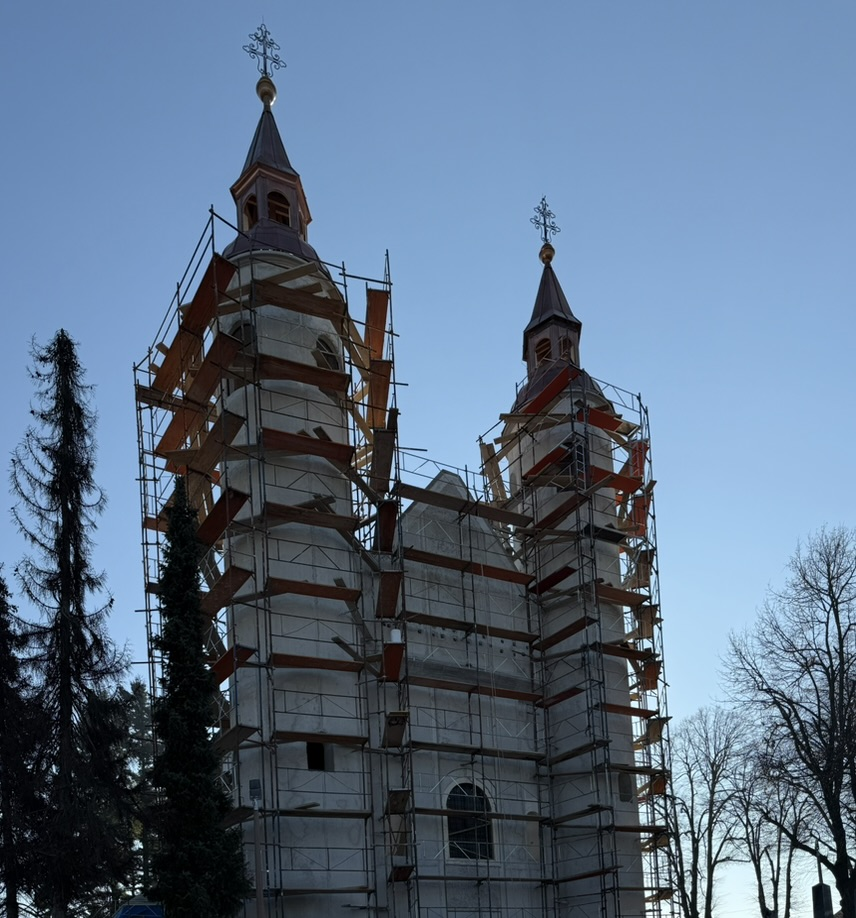
Church under scaffolding, January 2025

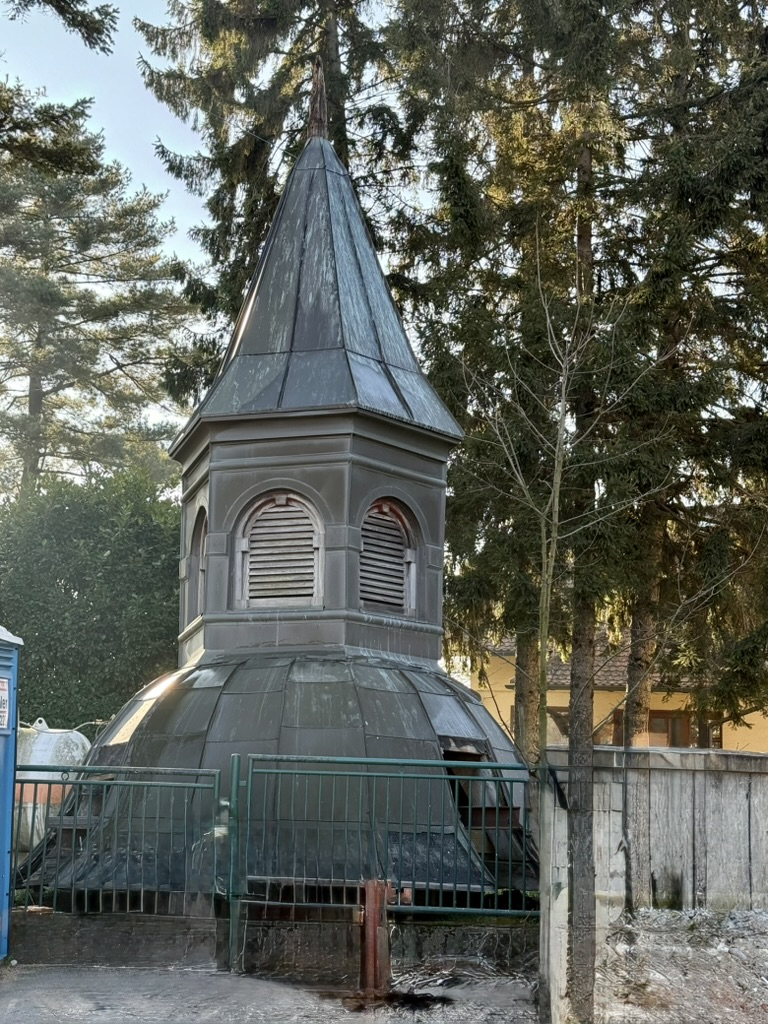
Renovation, January 2025
