= Assumption of Our Lady Church, Bolderāja =

Church building in Riga, Latvia

Coordinates: 57°01′59″N 24°02′58″E

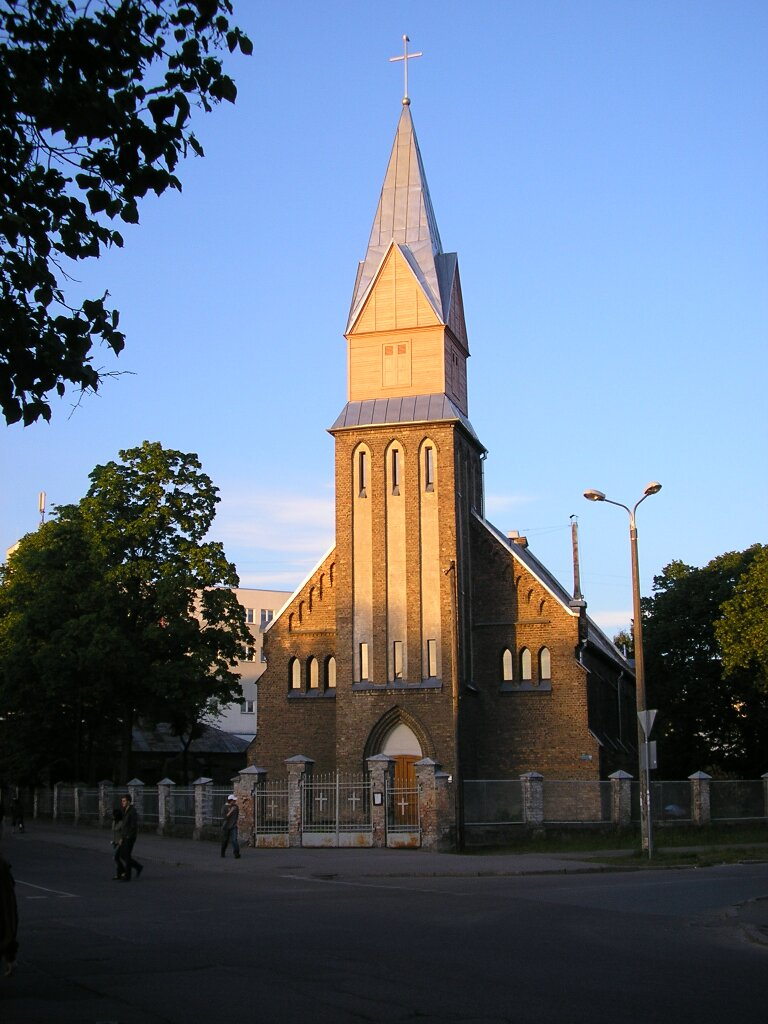
Assumption Church in Bolderāja

Assumption of the Most Holy Virgin Mary Church (Latvian: Bolderājas Vissvētākās Jaunavas Marijas Debesīs uzņemšanas Romas katoļu baznīca) is a catholic church in Bolderāja, a suburb of Riga, Latvia. The church is situated at the address 17 Goba Street.
