= Church of the Assumption of the Blessed Virgin Mary (Washington, D.C.) =

Assumption Catholic Church
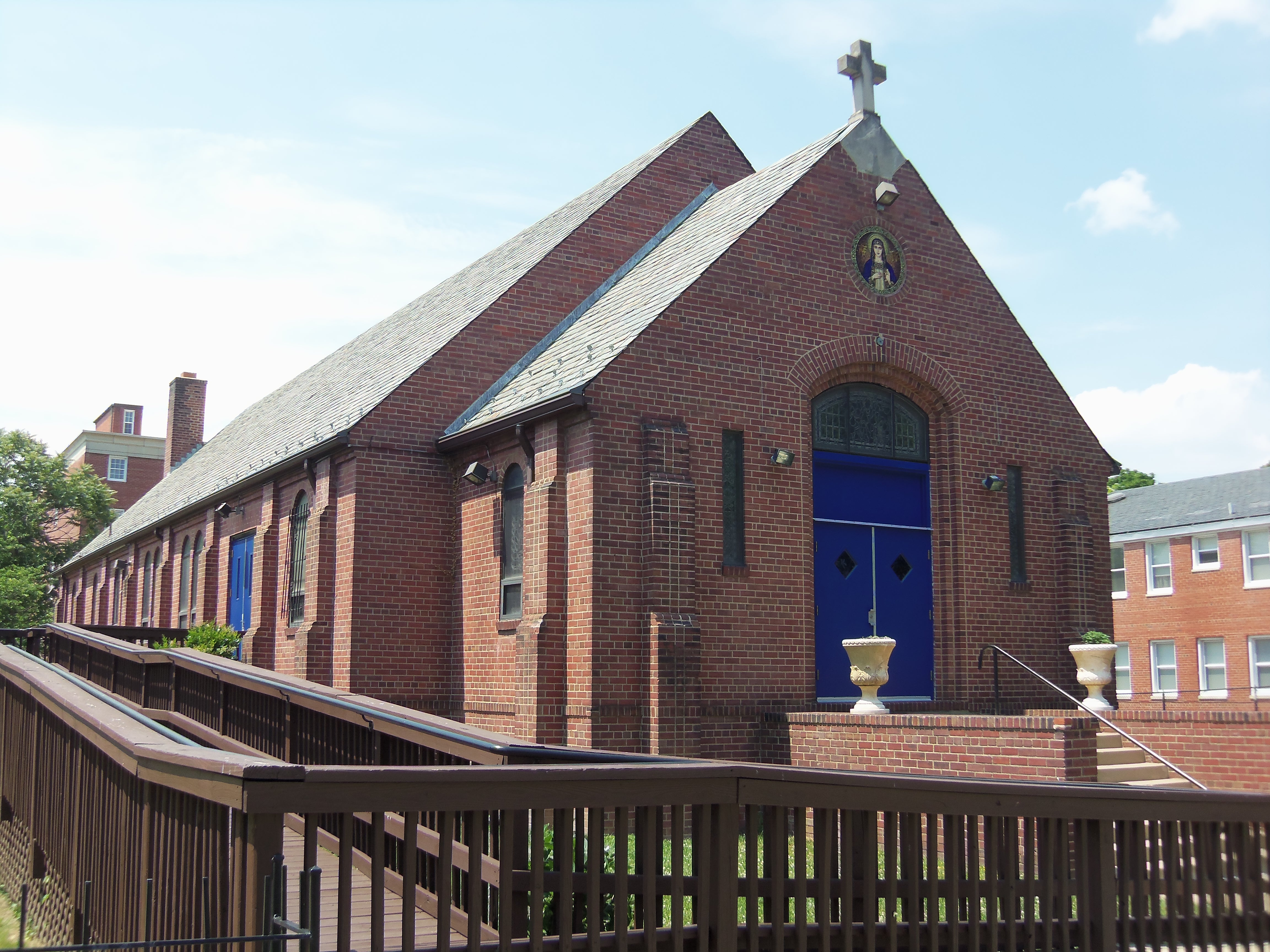
- Assumption Catholic Church in SE DC

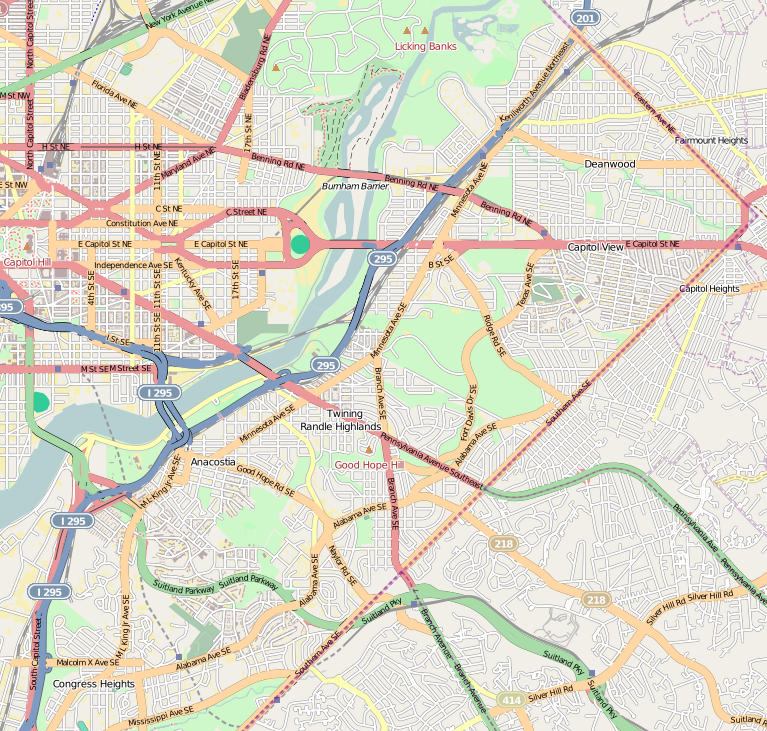
- 38°50′28″N 077°00′15″W
- Location: 3401 Martin Luther King Jr. Ave, SE, Washington, D.C.
- Country: United States
- Denomination: Roman Catholic
- Website: assumptiondc.org

Administration
- Archdiocese: Washington

Clergy
- Pastor: Fr. Greg Shaffer

The Church of the Assumption of the Blessed Virgin Mary is located in the Congress Heights neighborhood of Washington, D.C. It is a parish church of the Archdiocese of Washington.

== Location ==
Assumption Church is located in Southeast, Washington, D.C. It is near St. Elizabeths and the Barry Farm.

== History ==
=== Origins ===
The first Mass was said at the Church of the Incarnation on 600 Alabama Avenue in 1916. Pastor John Horstkamp acquired property on Martin Luther King Jr. Ave. (then known as Nichols Ave.) and built a multipurpose hall at the location of the present day Assumption Church. Church of the Incarnation in moved to in the early 1900s. The cornerstone of the current structure was laid by John. M. McNamara, Auxiliary Bishop of Baltimore in March 1933. The church was dedicated in fall of the same year. Cornerstones for Assumption School, Convent and a new rectory were laid in 1950.

=== Pastors ===
- Rev. Greg Shaffer (2016–present)
- Rev. Mark Ivany (2012-2015)
- Rev. William Montgomery (2010-2012)
- Rev. Roy Campbell (2008-2010)
- Rev. Charles Green (2004-2008)
- Rev. Scott Woods was assigned as administrator during a period of hospitalization of Rev. Green
- Rev. Ansgar Laczko (1992-2004)
- Rev. Brian Vaughn (1991-1992)
- Rev. Francis Walsh (1986-1991)
- Rev. Thomas P. Kelly (1979-1986)
- Rev. Thomas A. Kane (1972-1979)
- Rev. Raymond P. Cahill (1969-1972)
- Rev. George V. Joyce (1967-1969)
- Rev. Charles E. Roach (1936-1966)
- Rev. Joseph M. Moran (1934-1936)
- Rev. Francis X. Cavanaugh (1931-1933)
- Rev. William Carroll (1922-1931)
- Rev. John E. Horstkamp (1916-1922)

=== School ===
Assumption School operated from at least 1969 to 1983 providing primary education through eighth grade. Sisters of the Holy Cross staffed the school until the 1970s.

=== Pope Francis Outreach Center ===
In the 1960s during a time of racial and economic tension, Pastor Joyce established the "Helping Hand Program," which expanded to the Outreach Program under his successor Pastor Cahill. Pastor Ivany recruited donors to convert the old Convent to house the growing outreach center. Today, volunteers at the Pope Francis Outreach Center continues to perform corporal works of mercy, feeding the hungry and distributing clothing to residents of Ward 8 in need.

=== Missionaries of Charity ===
In the late 70s, Pastor Kane welcomed the Missionaries of Charity to the parish. The sisters run a house for homeless single mothers and a soup kitchen in the neighborhood nearby. In 2005, one of the sisters in the community was abducted from the convent but released with minor injuries the same day. Mother Teresa visited the parish during travel to Washington, DC.

== Architecture ==
Donald S. Johnson, Sr. was the architect.

== Art ==
The stained glass windows were installed in 1933. Pastor Ivany commissioned paintings of saint on the back wall of the church including: Martin de Porres, Josephine Bakhita, Mother Teresa, and Pope John Paul II.

== Music ==
The pipe organ is an M. P. Möller Opus 6152 (ca. 1932) featuring two manuals and 23 registers.
