= Parish Church of the Assumption, Qrendi =

Parish Church of the Assumption of Mary
- Il-Knisja Parrokkjali tal-Assunta
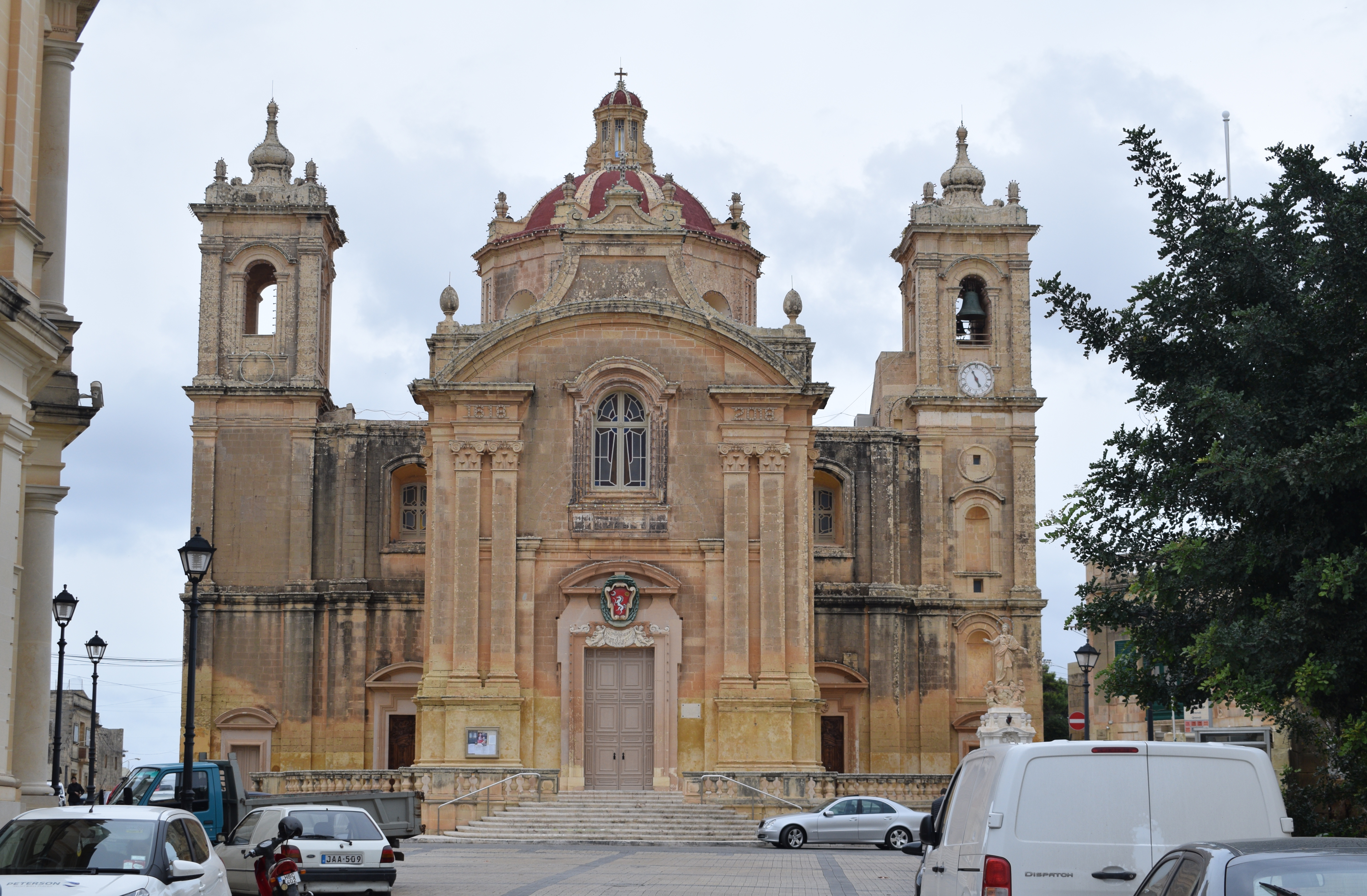
- The church's façade in 2017
- Parish Church of the Assumption of Mary
- 35°50′04.0″N 14°27′27.0″E
- Location: Qrendi, Malta
- Denomination: Roman Catholic
- Website: www.parroccaqrendi.org

History
- Status: Active
- Founded: 1620
- Dedication: Assumption of Mary
- Consecrated: 13 October 1782

Architecture
- Functional status: Parish church
- Architectural type: Church
- Style: Baroque
- Completed: 1712

Specifications
- Materials: Limestone

Administration
- Diocese: Malta
- Parish: Qrendi

Clergy
- Rector: Glen Buhagiar

The Church of the Assumption (Malti Knisja tal-Assunta or Knisja ta' Santa Marija) is a Roman Catholic parish church located in Qrendi, Malta.

== History ==
While Qrendi formed part of the parish of Żurrieq, in 1575 its main church was dedicated to the Nativity of Mary. Sometime later, in the year 1594, it was however rebuilt by the people of the village and was rededicated to the Assumption of Mary. During second pastoral visit of Bishop Baldassare Cagliares he declared Qrendi a separate parish, uniting to it the two small communities of Ħal Lew and Ħal Manin. This dismemberment took place on 15 February 1618 with the consent of Rev. Nicola Bonnici, the parish priest of Żurrieq.

As many times happened, a few years after a parish was erected, the church identified to serve as the parish church became inadequate for the daily religious needs of the parishioners as these began to grow in number. This created the need for modification, enlargement or replacement of the original church, when, Reverend GioMaria Camilleri thought of building a new church. The site chosen was the land on which two small churches stood next to each other, one dedicated to the Assumption of Our Lady and the other to St Anthony.

The work on the new parish church started in 1620, and with the contribution of the community the construction was concluded thirty-five years later, that is in 1655. While the church was still being built a pastoral visit took place. It was Bishop Miguel Juan Balaguer Camarasa who, following his consecration as Bishop of Malta in February 1636, visited Qrendi, and who then examined the parish church and its altars. The sacristy was already erected whilst the church had three doors and there seemed to be a plan to enlarge the building.

The building of the parish church continued when in 1668 work started on the belfry known as ‘Tal-Agunija’ (Agony), which took eleven years to complete. By 1679, during the administration of the parish priest Rev. Marco Bellia, the parish church was completed.

With the advent of Rev. Domenico Formosa, a native of Qrendi, the parish church was thus once again demolished so that a more spacious edifice could be built. The plan for the new church was the work of the highly experienced and able Lorenzo Gafà.

Don Domenico appears to have been quite an inspiration to his parishioners, maybe also because they saw in him a native of their village and one from their community. His zeal moved the villagers to give their contribution to the construction of the church which began in 1685 and continued till 1691, stopping for a number of years and then resuming in 1695. According to Ferres, who was writing in the mid-nineteenth century, the sacrifices made by the Qrendin to build their church were without comparison in the history of the Maltese Church. One example of extreme sacrifice was the parish priest himself. According to Ferres, on 17 January 1699 Don Domenico, wishing to encourage his parishioners to do more towards the construction of the church, thought of lending a hand so as to lead by example. He grasped a stone, put it on his shoulder, and thus burdened climbed up a long ladder. On reaching the top, while Don Domenico was stepping on a plank of the scaffolding he tripped and fell to the ground dying on the spot – a victim of his remarkable zeal. Work continued and the edifice was complete in 1712.

The church is listed on the National Inventory of the Cultural Property of the Maltese Islands.

== Structure ==
The church is in the form of a Latin cross, following the general rule of church design found in the majority of churches in Malta. It thus comprises a choir, two transepts, a central nave and two sacristies. While the edifice was still under construction, parish priest Rev. Pietro Zerafa, who took over the administration of Qrendi in 1701, ordered the dismantling of part of the already built structure to enlarge the church. A later addition is the sacristy which stands to the left of the choir; this was added in the nineteenth century on the initiative of Rev. Dr Celestino Camilleri who managed to raise a good sum of money for its erection. The work was done in 1865.

The Gafà church is 34.44 metres long; the nave is 7.01 metres wide while it measures 23.16 metres from transept to transept. It has ten altars, an elegant dome, and two belfries, one on each side of the façade. It was consecrated by Bishop Fra Vincenzo Labini on 13 October 1782 during the tenure of office of Rev. Antonio Mizzi – a hard-working and highly loved parish priest. The works done by this priest comprise two out of the four bells that hung in the church's belfries.

== Works of art ==
With the Gafà church in full function the parish priests who were appointed to administer the parish now saw to it to add necessary facilities and to embellish the parish church. Thus the parish priest Pietro Paolo Xuereb commissioned the artist Giuseppe Calleja to decorate the dome, the ceiling and the main pilasters of the church. In 1971, on the initiative of the parish priest Rev. Karm Attard, the ceiling and dome were redecorated. with episodes from the life of the Blessed virgin as commissioned to renowned artist Pawlu Camilleri Cauchi.

From its establishment as a parish Qrendi's patron saint has been the Assumption of Our Lady. In the parish church there are three paintings depicting the Assumption. The current titular painting was commissioned in 1917 to the renowned artist Giuseppe Calì and replaced the one that hung on the main altar, the work of Rocco Buhagiar

The Qrendi parish church has two sacristies. One of them, known as the sacristy of the priests, holds the old titular painting of the Assumption of the Madonna done by Rocco Buhagiar in the 18th century. A plaque on the wall commemorates the consecration of the church by Bishop Mgr Labini in 1782. There is also a small chapel adjacent to the sacristy, which also holds some interesting works of art. Among these is the first statue of the Immaculate Conception used for the Marian celebrations in Qrendi. The other sacristy, which is locally known as that of the confreres, holds a portrait of Rev. Celestino Camilleri who brought to Qrendi the remains of St Celestino and who also did the floor of the main altar in 1882. There is also a statue by Karlu Darmanin that represents St Philip Neri and which was in the past carried during the procession of Our Lady of Lourdes.

Similar to other parish churches that have been long established, the church of Qrendi possesses a number of statues besides the titular. One such is that of Our Lady of Sorrows which was done by Wistin (Agostino) Camilleri and is a work in papier-mâché of 1972. The statue of Our Lady of the Girdle (Consolation) is by Karlu Darmanin and is connected to its Confraternity. Darmanin also completed the statue of Our Lady of Lourdes in 1878, made of papier-mâché, twenty years after the apparitions at Lourdes. The statue of Our Lady of the Holy Rosary is the work of Carmelo Mallia known as ‘Il-Lhudi’ and is associated to the Confraternity of the Holy Rosary of Qrendi. The Qrendin felt the need to have a titular statue representing the Assumption. For this new statue they contracted the sculptor Antonio Chircop from Senglea. The statue depicted the Madonna in a pose in which the position of the arms was unique. The rich colours signify the human and the divine. It was completed in 1837.
