= Church of the Assumption, Zrenjanin =

Church building in Zrenjanin, Serbia

Coordinates: 45°22′50″N 20°23′45″E

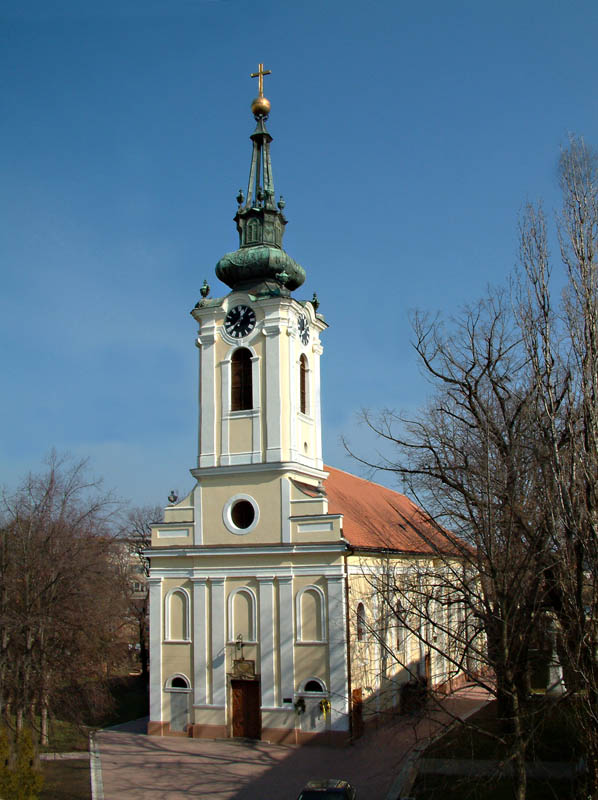
Church of the Dormition

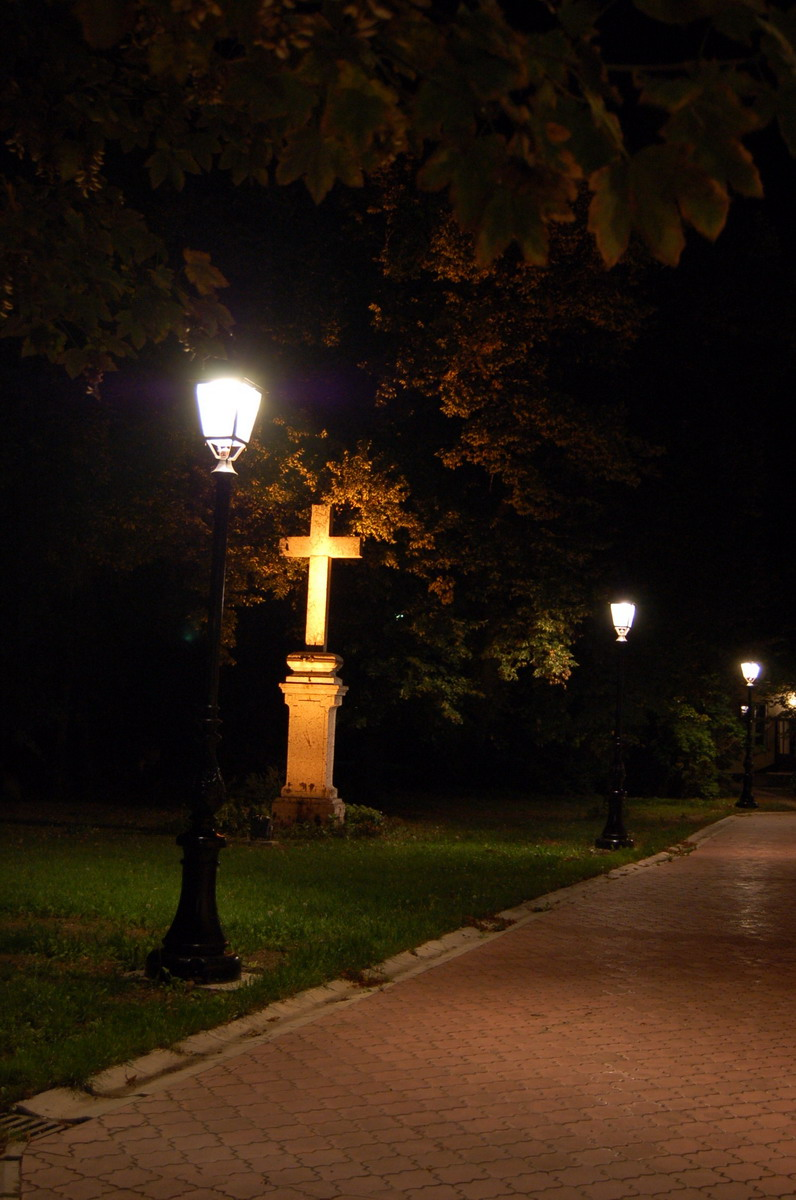
One of two crosses in the yard

The Church of the Dormition (Serbian: Uspenska crkva, Hram Uspenja Bogorodice, Temple of the Dormition of the Holy Virgin) is a Serbian Orthodox Church in Zrenjanin. It was built in 1746, in Bečkerek, today Zrenjanin. It is located in Svetosavska street.

== History ==
It is the oldest church in Zrenjanin. Since it was covered with roof tiles, it managed to survive a fire in 1807.

The church is built in Baroque style, and it is very similar to the Orthodox Cathedral in Sremski Karlovci. Iconostasis was done by Dimitrije Popović, and continued in 1815 by Georgije Popović. The wall paintings were done between 1928 and 1930 by academic painter Aleksandar Sekulić, who was born in Veliki Bečkerek.

The Uspenska church testifies to the Bečkerek Serbs' full acceptance of the modern European artistic streams around the middle of the 18th century.

The church was renovated in 2000. Flood lights were installed in 2005, so it is possible to see all its beauty during night hours. Uspenska church is protected by law as a cultural and historical monument of interest.

In the church yard, there are two marble crosses, which were removed from Zrenjanin's two squares during the 1950s.
