= Church of the Assumption of the Blessed Virgin Mary, Palanga =

Roman Catholic church in Palanga, Lithuania

Church of the Assumption of the Blessed Virgin Mary
- Švč. Mergelės Marijos Ėmimo į dangų bažnyčia
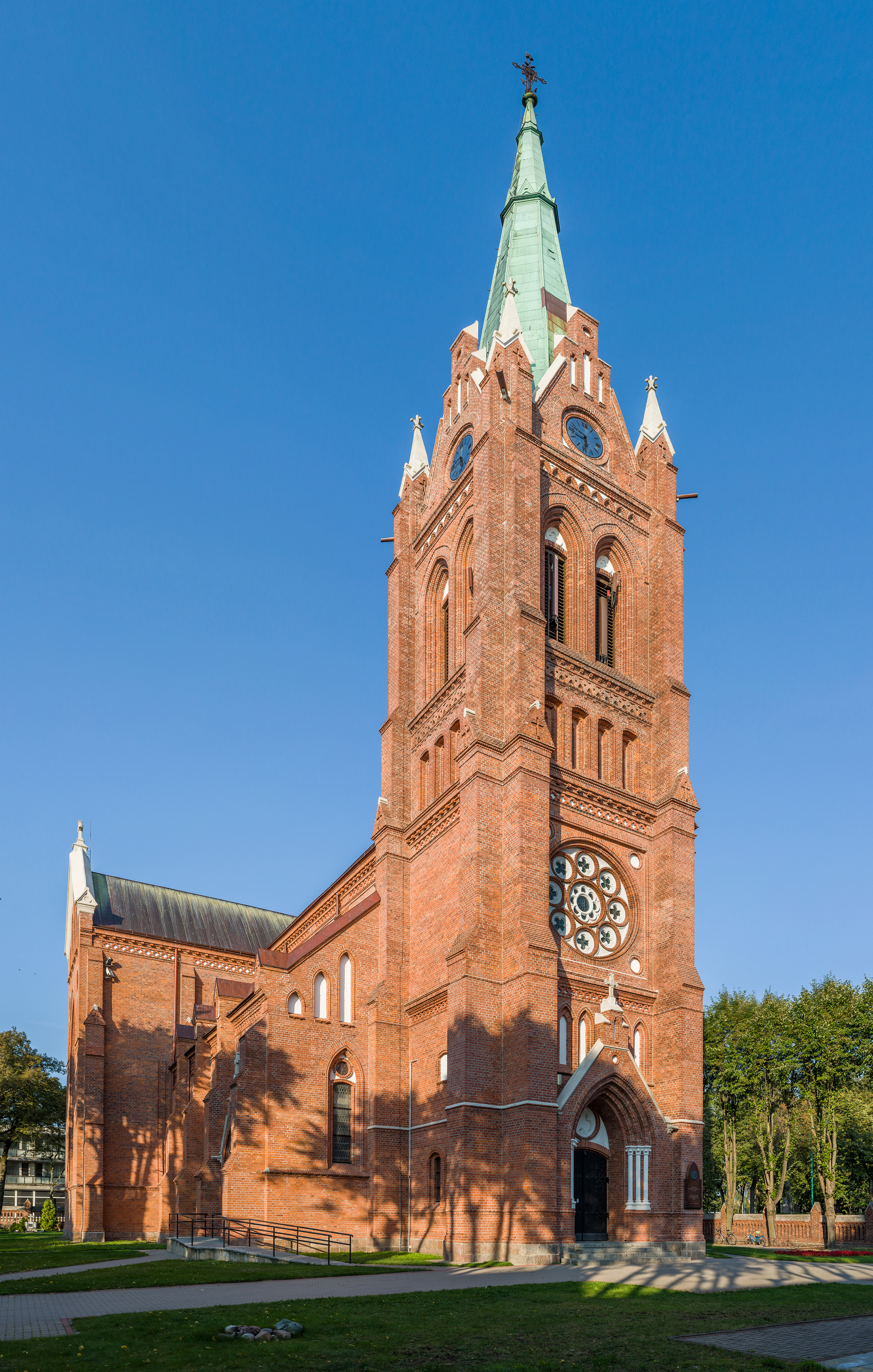
- Main façade of the church

Religion
- Affiliation: Roman Catholic
- Diocese: City centre
- Ecclesiastical or organizational status: Active
- Leadership: Roman Catholic Diocese of Telšiai
- Year consecrated: 1906

Location
- Location: Palanga, Lithuania
- Interactive map of Church of the Assumption of the Blessed Virgin Mary
- Coordinates: 55°55′4″N 21°3′57″E

Architecture
- Architect: Karl Eduard Strandmann
- Type: Church
- Style: Gothic Revival
- Completed: 1907

Specifications
- Spire: 1
- Spire height: 24 metres (79 ft)
- Materials: Brick masonry

The Church of the Assumption of the Blessed Virgin Mary (Lithuanian: Švč. Mergelės Marijos Ėmimo į dangų bažnyčia) is a Roman Catholic church in Palanga, Lithuania.

== History ==
The first small wooden Catholic church in Palanga was built around 1540 at the behest of Grand Duchess Anna Jagiellon. Another cross-shaped church with a tower and a belfry was built in 1590 at the initiative of the then rulers of Lithuania.

In 1767, the wooden church was reconstructed and stood for 140 years.

In 1897, according to the project of the Swedish architect Karl Eduard Strandmann, the construction of a new Gothic Revival style church began next to the old church, which was consecrated in 1906 and completed in 1907. Following the completion of a new brick masonry church with 24 metres spire, the old wooden church was demolished.

== Gallery ==
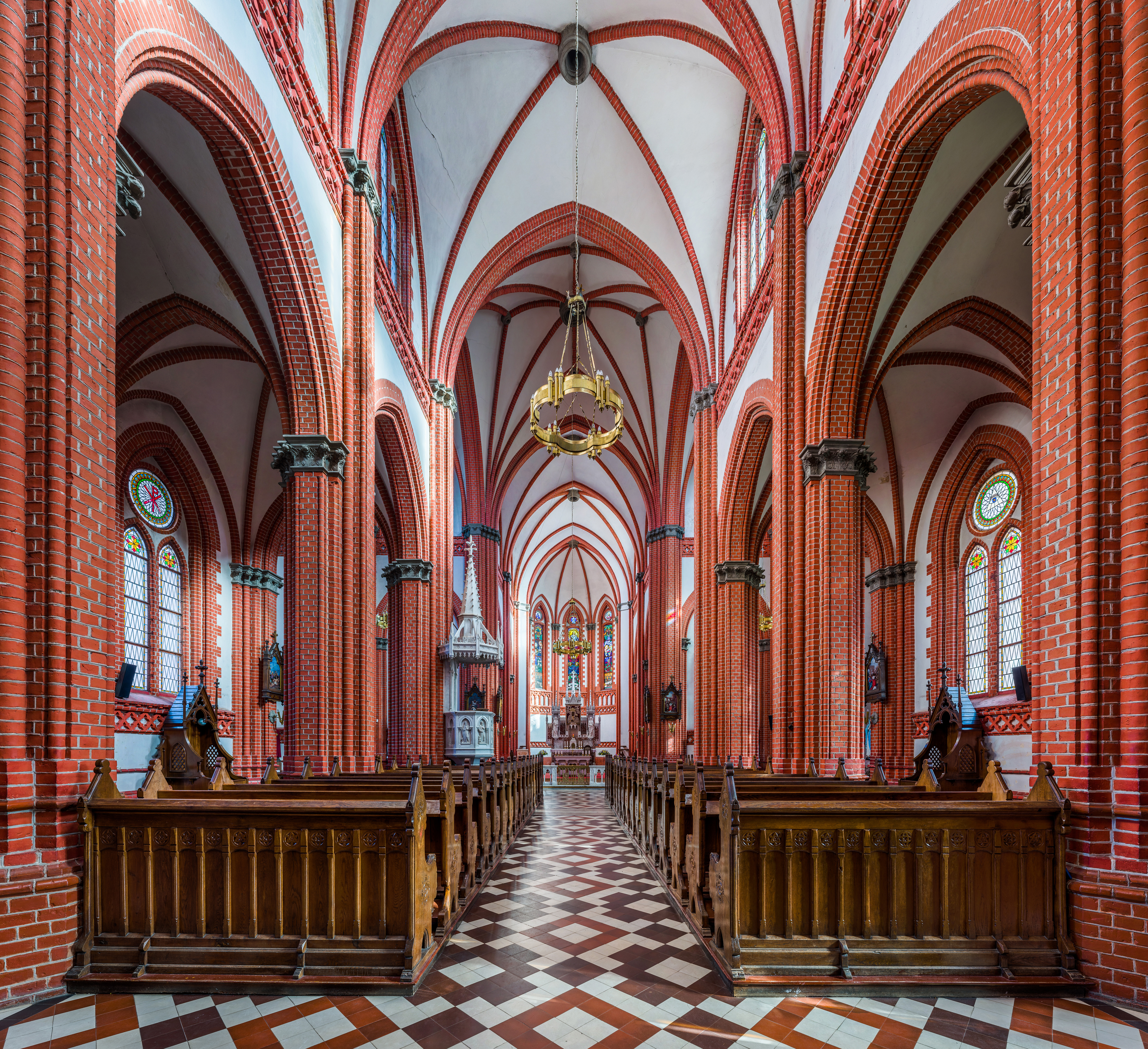
Interior, looking at the central altar

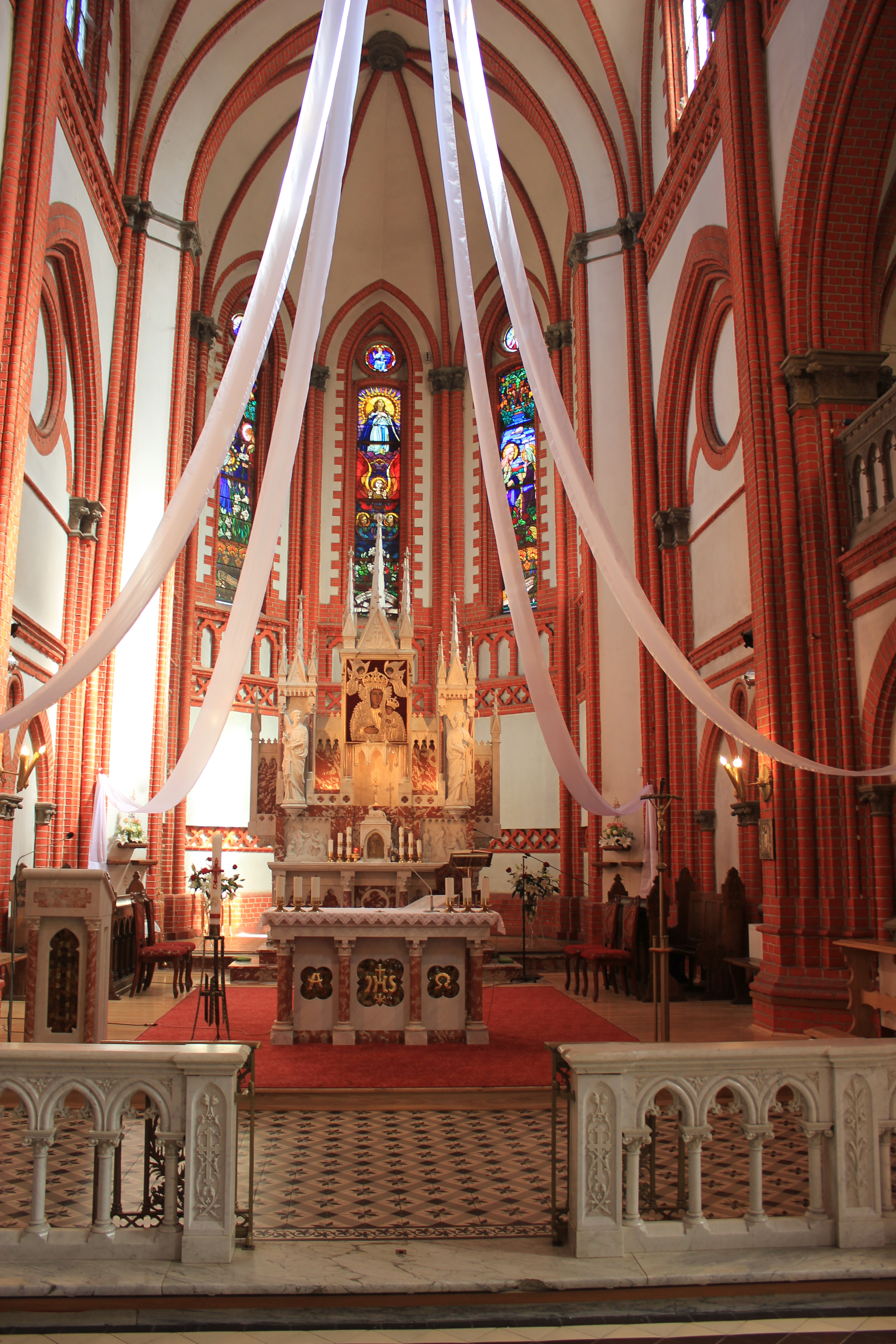
Central altar

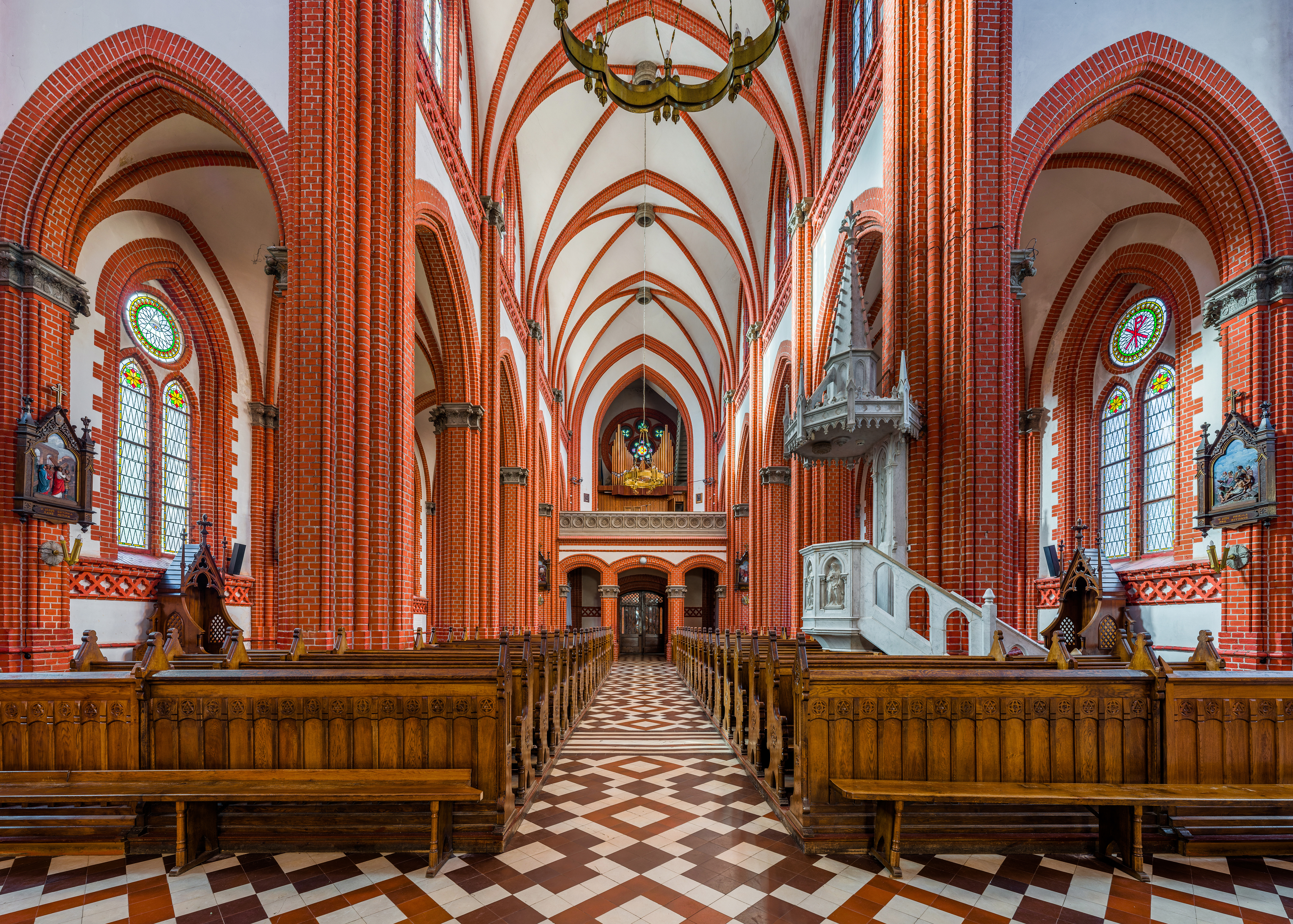
Interior, looking at the organ

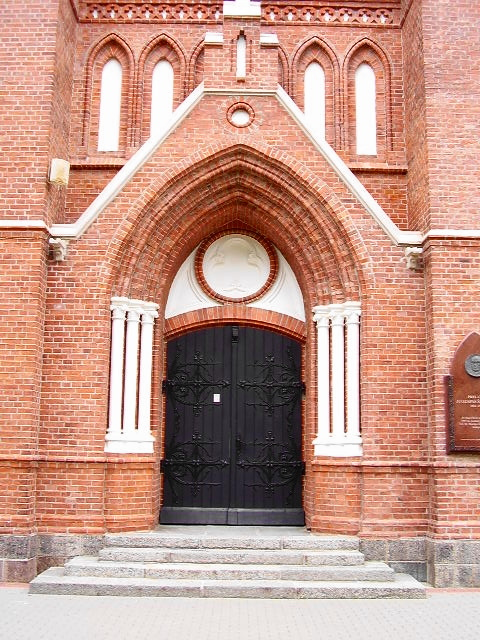
Main entrance
