= Church of the Assumption and Rectory =

Historic church in Kansas, United States

- U.S. National Register of Historic Places
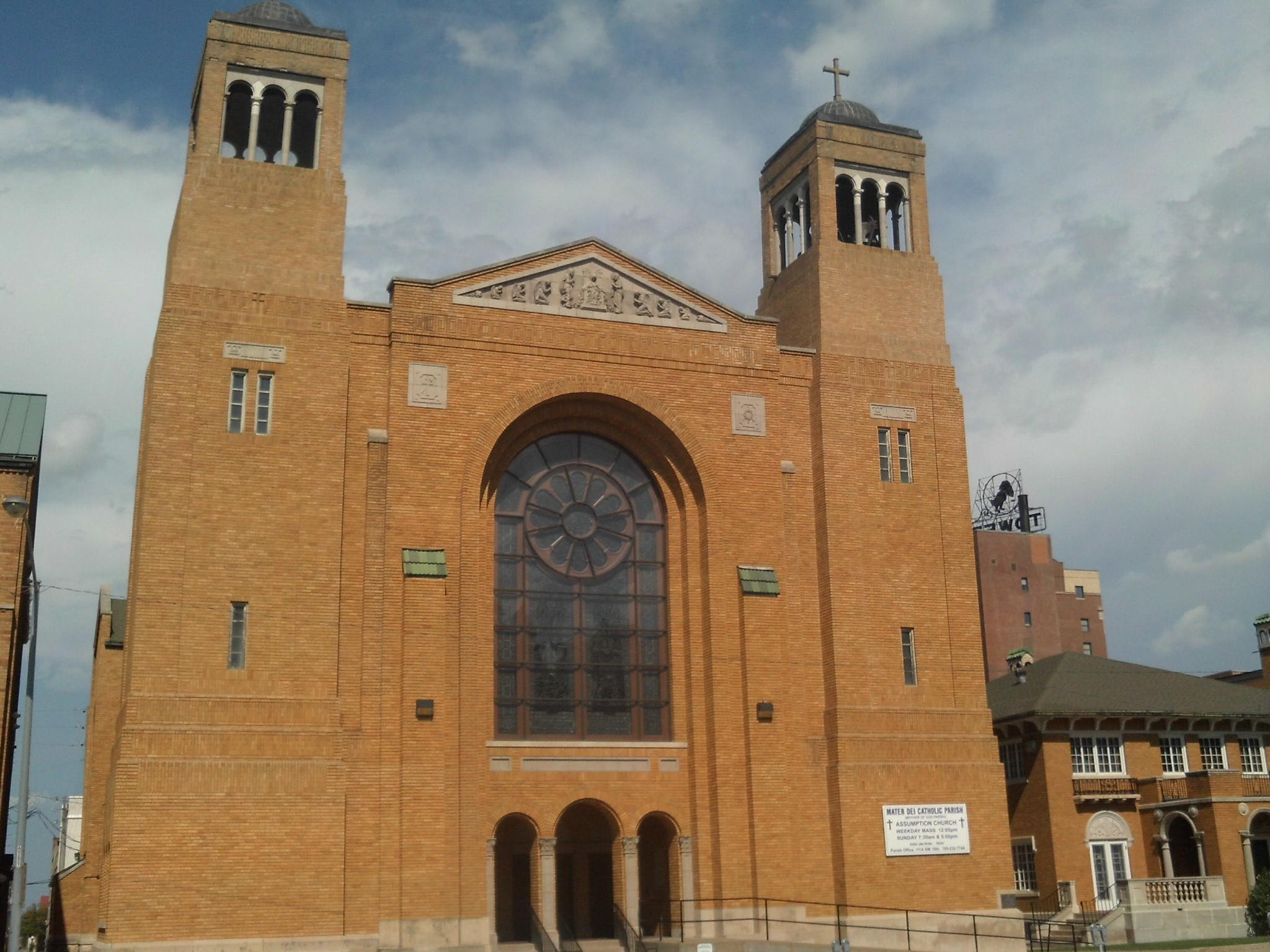

- Location within Kansas Location within the United States
- Location: 204 SW 8th St, Topeka, Kansas
- Coordinates: 39°3′5″N 95°40′35″W
- Area: less than one acre
- Built: 1924
- Architect: Carroll, J. Maurice; et al.
- Architectural style: Renaissance, Mission/spanish Revival
- NRHP reference No.: 08000607
- Added to NRHP: July 2, 2008

Church of the Assumption and Rectory is a historic church and rectory at 204 SW 8th Street in Topeka, Kansas. The church was built in 1924 and added to the National Register in 2008.

The Assumption Rectory was completed in 1929 and is an example of Renaissance Revival style.
