= Church of the Assumption, Shanghai =

Coordinates: 31.2065°N 121.3620°E

Xiyantang
- Church of the Assumption of Mary; Catholic Country Church
- 息焉堂
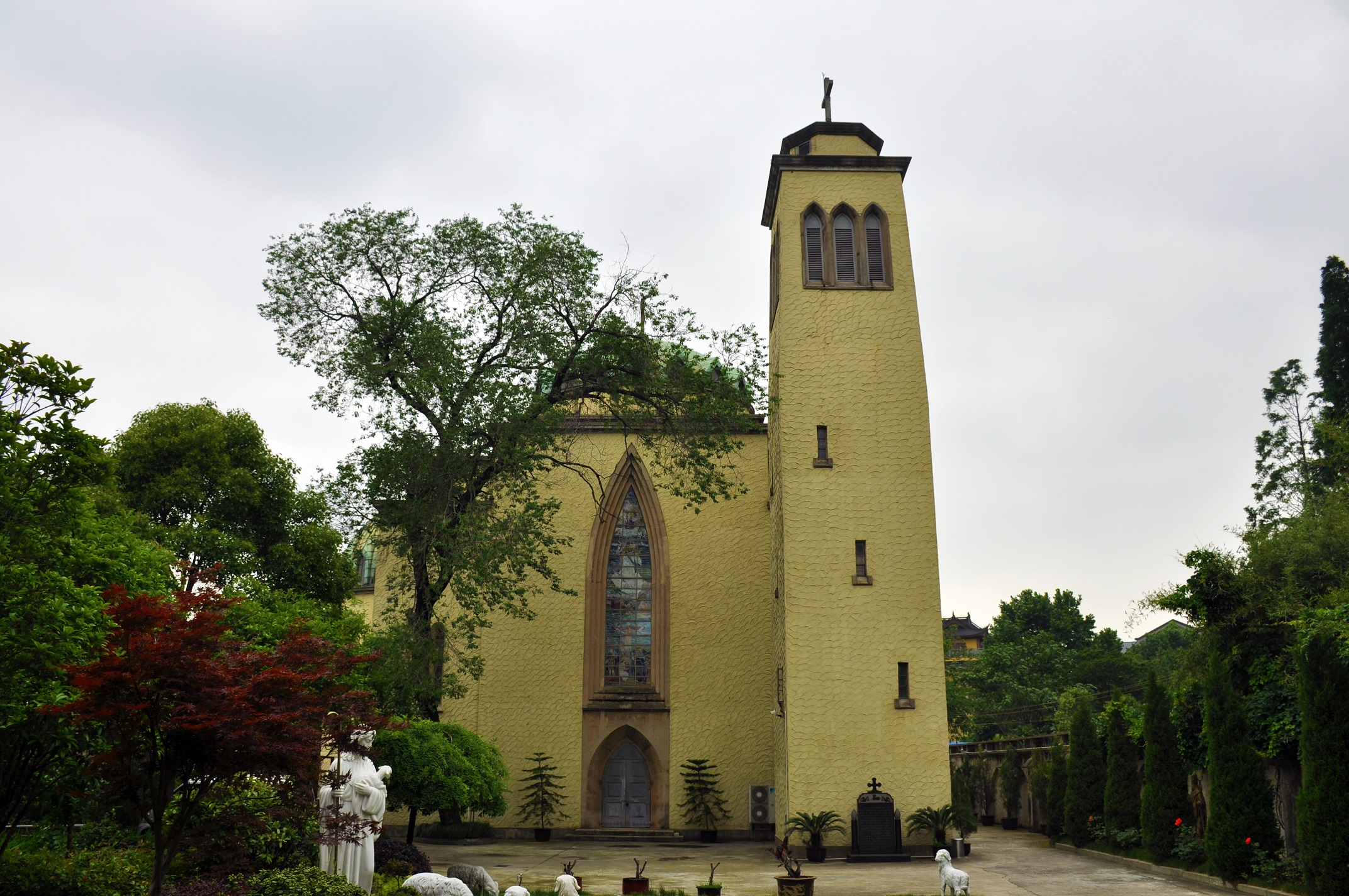
- Xiyantang
- Location: Kele Road, Changning District, Shanghai
- Country: China
- Denomination: Catholic Church
- Sui iuris church: Latin Church

Architecture
- Architect(s): Attributed in different sources to Pan Shiyi and László Hudec
- Style: Byzantine-style church architecture with Gothic and Romanesque elements

Administration
- Diocese: Roman Catholic Diocese of Shanghai

Xiyantang (Chinese: 息焉堂; pinyin: Xīyān Táng), also known as the Church of the Assumption of Mary (Chinese: 圣母升天堂; pinyin: Shèngmǔ Shēngtiāntáng), is a Roman Catholic church in Changning District, Shanghai, China. The church stands near Kele Road and Hami Road, to the north of Shanghai Zoo, and belongs to the Roman Catholic Diocese of Shanghai. Its name is usually explained as meaning "to rest here", a reference to its original function as a chapel associated with a Catholic cemetery.

== Architecture ==
Xiyantang is a small church building with a floor area of 239 square metres. It combines Byzantine and Gothic styles.
