= Assumption of Mary Parish Church (Dekani) =

Church in Koper, Slovenia

Coordinates: 45°32′53.66″N 13°43′48.29″E

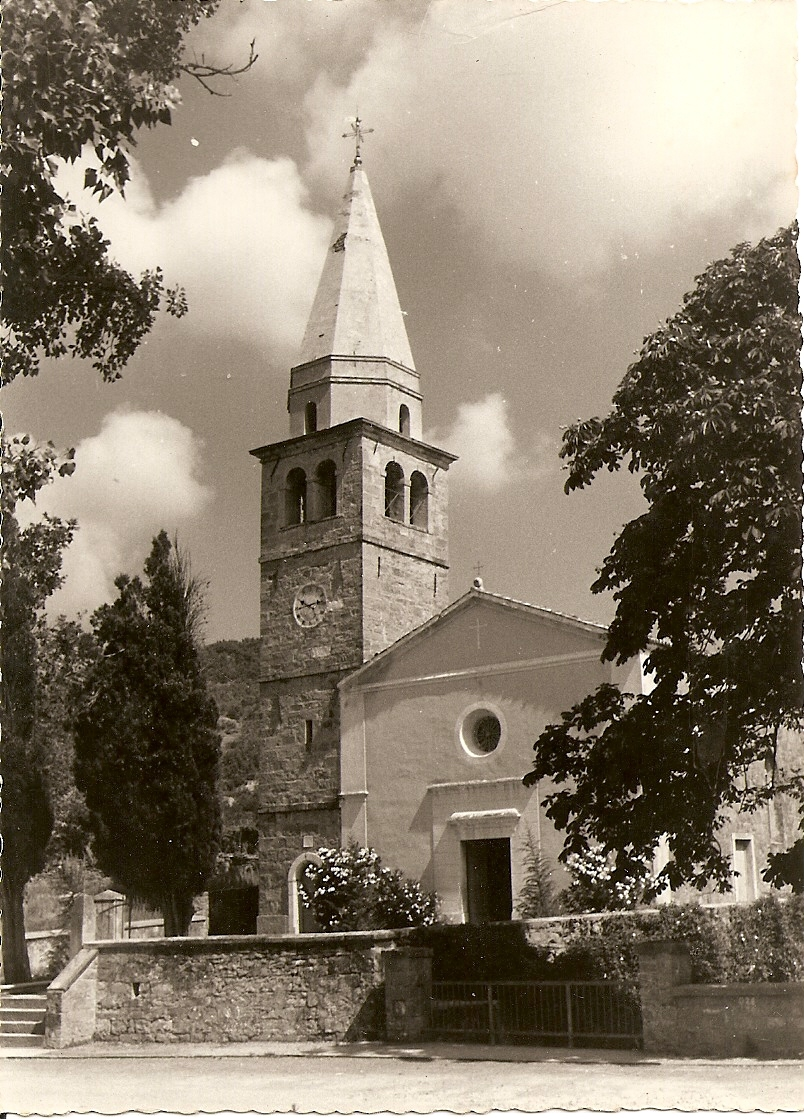
Assumption of Mary Parish Church (Dekani)

Assumption of Mary Parish Church in Dekani (Slovene: župnijska cerkev Marijinega vnebovzetja v Dekanih) is the parish church of the Parish of Dekani, a village near the city of Koper in southwest Slovenia. It was built in 1229, rebuilt towards the end of the 15th century, consecrated in 1493, and restored and enlarged in 1902.
