= Church of the Assumption of the Blessed Virgin Mary (Trinity-Lykov) =

Church in Moscow, Russia

Blessed Virgin Mary
- Church of the Assumption of the Blessed Virgin Mary
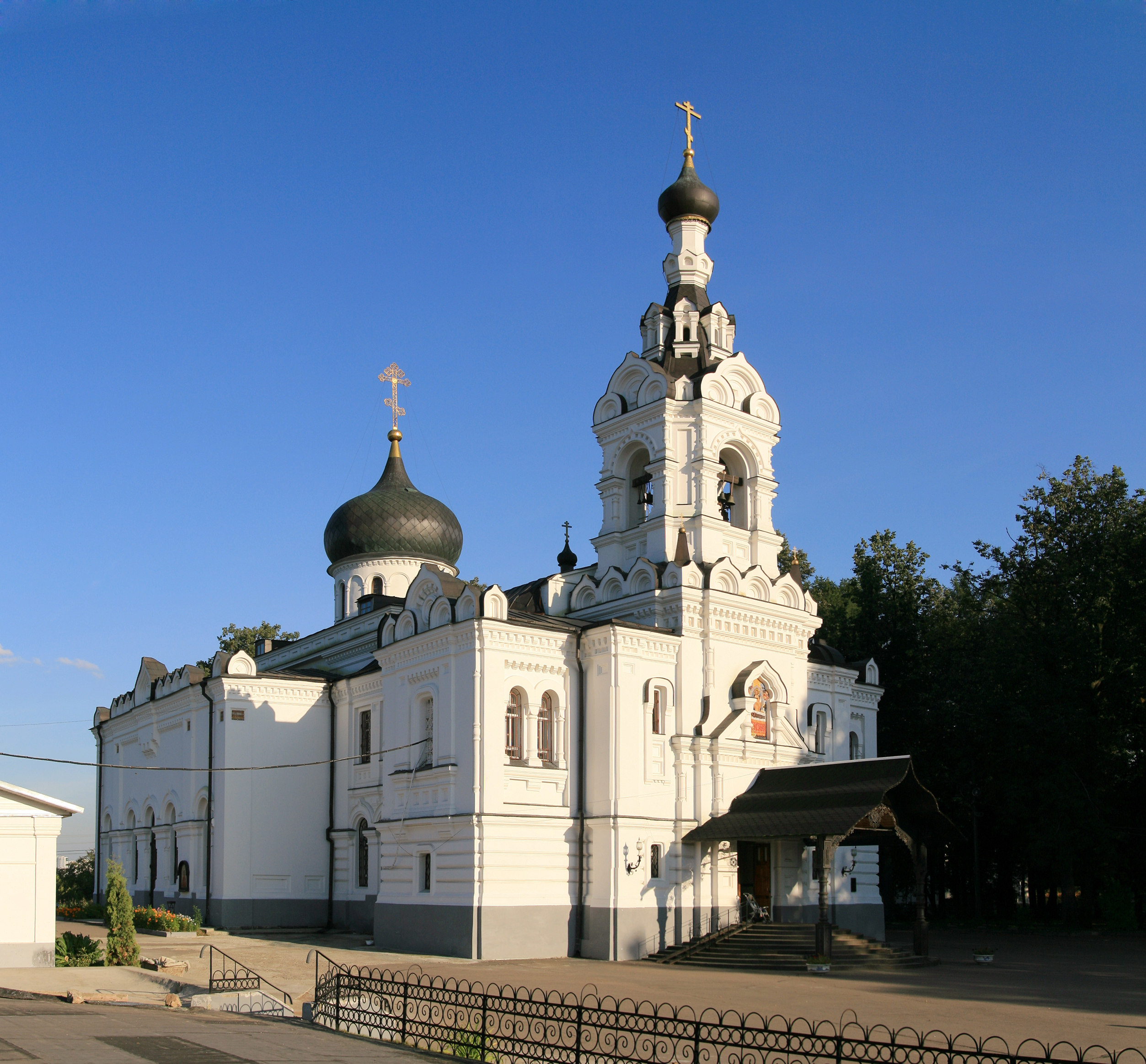
- Moscow, Odintsovo street, 24
- Blessed Virgin Mary

Church of the Assumption of the Blessed Virgin Mary in the Trinity-Lykov (Russian: Храм Успения Пресвятой Богородицы в Троице-Лыкове) is an Orthodox church of the Assumption deanery of the Urban Diocese of Moscow. It was built in the 1840s–1850s in the village of Troitsa-Lykovo near Moscow (now part of Moscow). The main throne is consecrated in honor of the feast of the Assumption of the Blessed Virgin Mary, lateral chapels - in honor of the Great Martyr Catherine and Nicholas the Wonderworker. The temple is a courtyard of the Intercession Monastery. It has the status of an object of cultural heritage of regional importance.

== History ==
The initiator of the construction of a new stone Church in the Trinity-Lykov was Nikolai Alexandrovich Buturlin, the son of the former owner of the village, Catherine Pavlovna Buturlina. In 1843, he submitted a petition to the Metropolitan of Moscow Filaret (Drozdov).

Original drawings of the temple have not survived, but it is known that the estimate for the construction of the temple was signed by Moscow architect Nikolai Ilyich Kozlovsky. The construction of the temple took longer than originally expected. The Northern chapel of the great Martyr Catherine was consecrated in 1851, the southern chapel of St. Nicholas on January 15, 1856. The chapels of the temple were consecrated in honor of the heavenly patrons Buturlin. It is known that at the time of the inventory of property in 1858, the main assumption throne was not yet consecrated.

In October 1989, the Church was returned to the Russian Orthodox Church, after which its restoration began. On March 31, 1990, it was again consecrated by the small priest. On October 30, 2011, Patriarch Kirill of Moscow and all Russia made the great consecration of the Church. In 2013, the Church is a metochion of the Pokrovsky Stavropigialny women's monastery of the intercession Outpost.

The plans of the architect S. F. Kulagin. 1901.
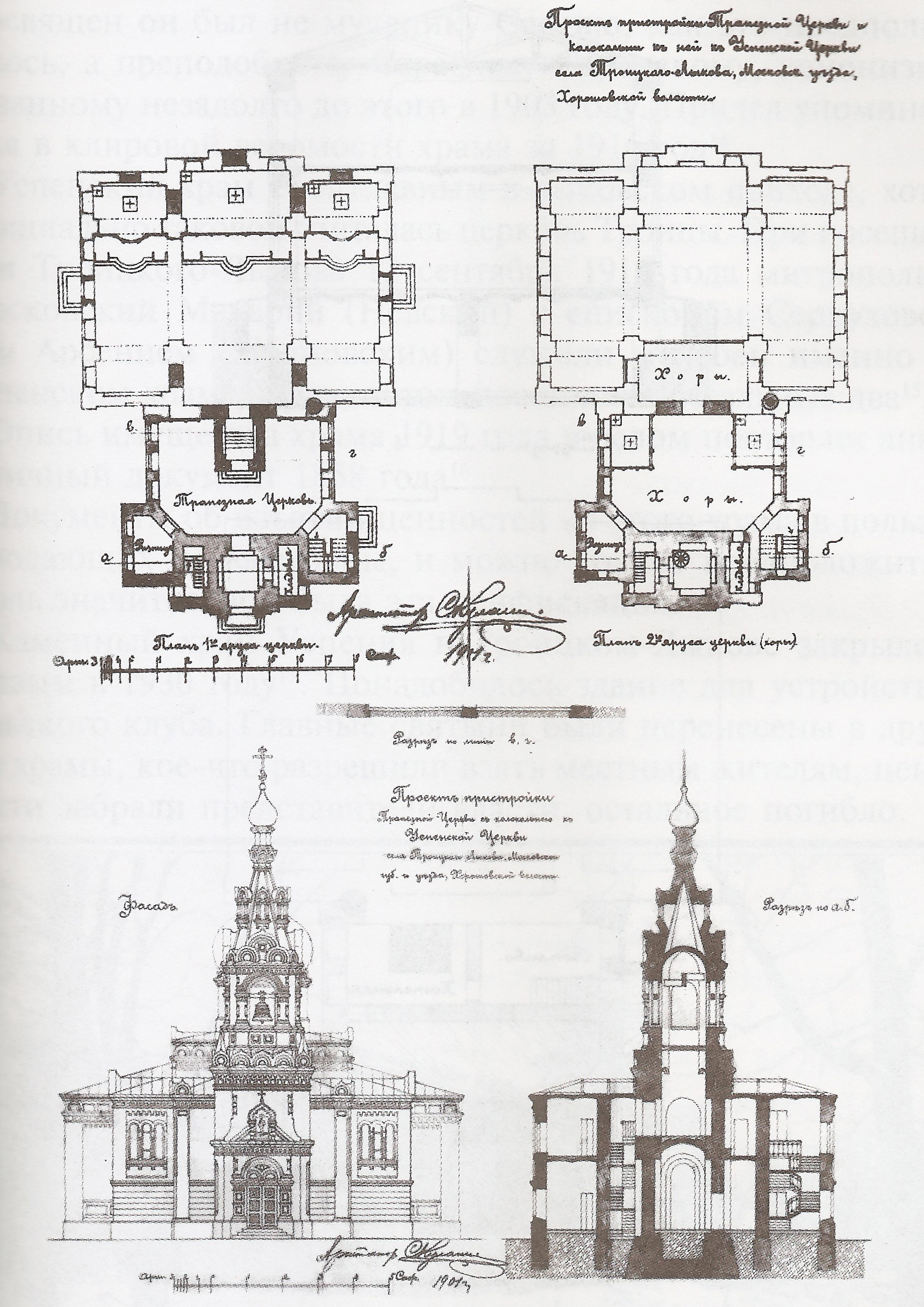
Project of bell tower extension

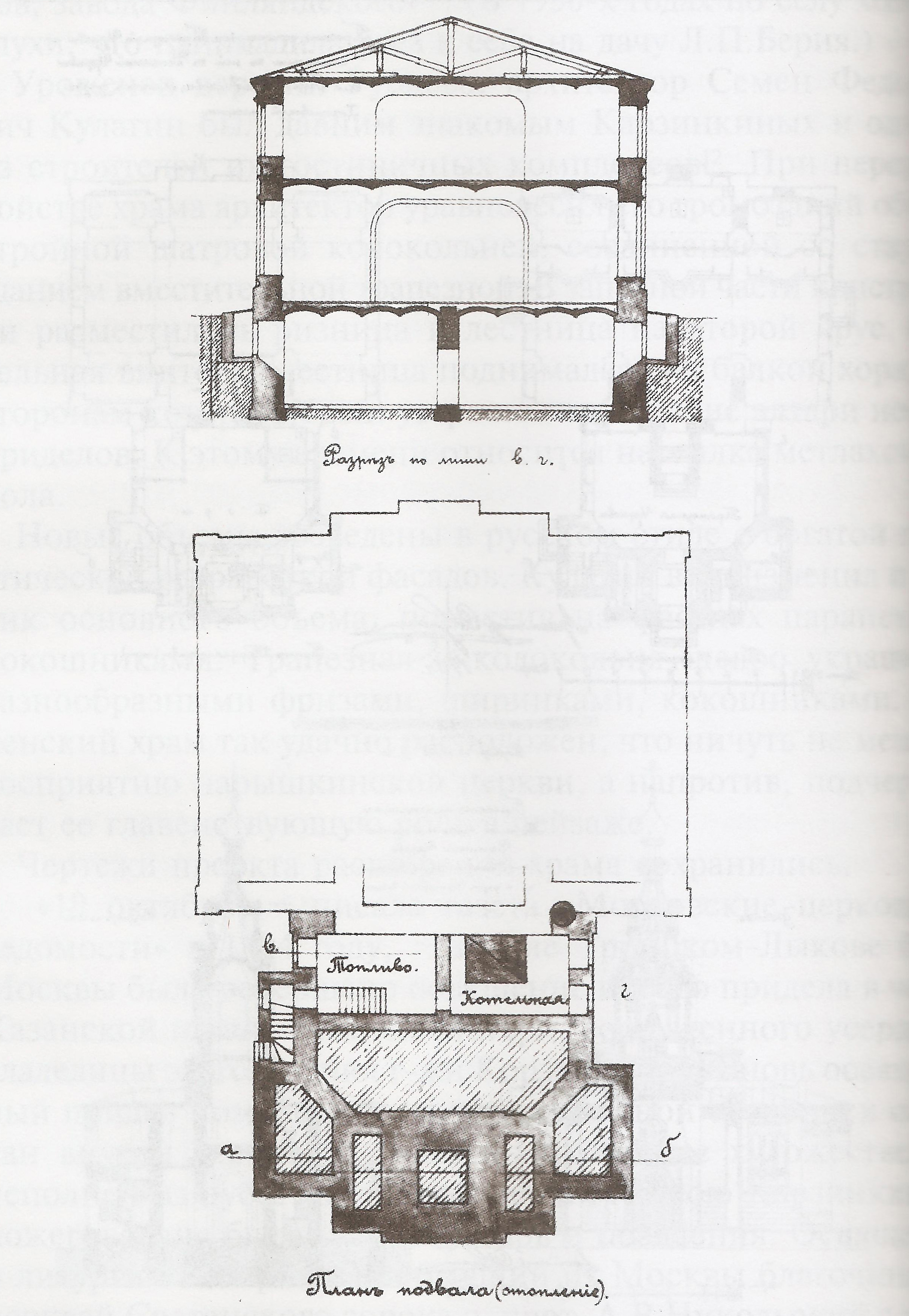
The incision and the basement plan

== Bibliography ==
- Вайнтрауб, Л. Р.; Карпова, М. Б.; Скопин, В. В. (2000). Храмы Северо-Западного округа и Зеленограда. Moscow: Издательский дом «Знаменское». pp. 242–250.
