= Church of la Asunción (Letur) =

- Iglesia Parroquial de la Asunción (Spanish)
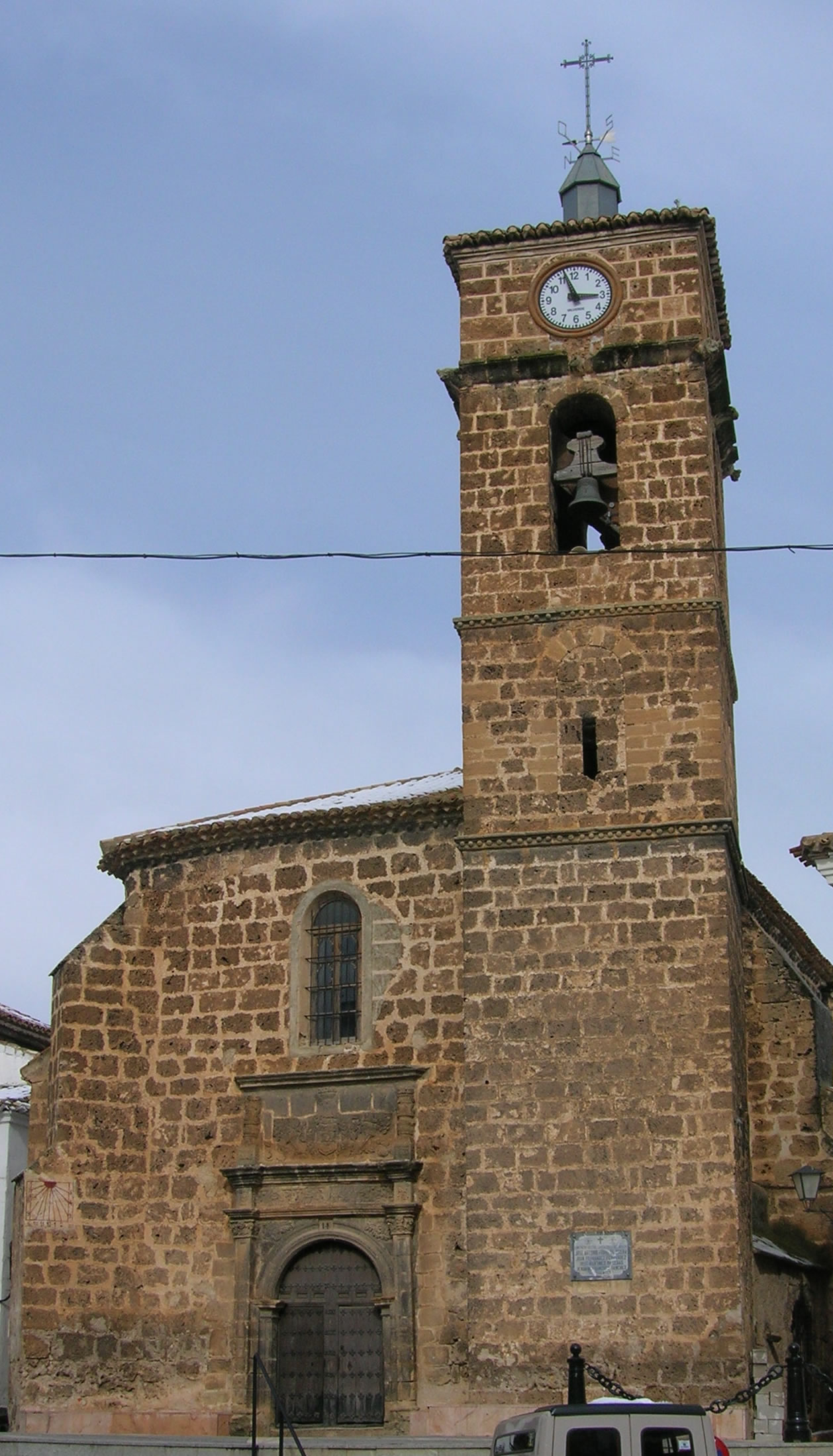

- Location within Spain
- 38.366501°N 2.101012°W
- Location: Letur, Spain

Spanish Cultural Heritage
- Official name: Iglesia Parroquial de la Asunción
- Type: Non-movable
- Criteria: Monument
- Designated: 1982
- Reference no.: RI-51-0004752

The Church of la Asunción (Spanish: Iglesia Parroquial de la Asunción) is a church located in Letur, Spain. It was declared Bien de Interés Cultural in 1982.

The church was erected in the late 15th and early 16th centuries. The style is late-gothic or Isabelline Gothic. The main portal is completed in Renaissance style. In the 13th-century, the region was under the rule of the militant knights of the Order of Santiago. The church was completed by 1536, and attributed to a Juan de Arana.
