= Church of la Asunción (Galapagar) =

Cultural property in Galapagar, Spain

- Iglesia Parroquial de la Asunción (Spanish)
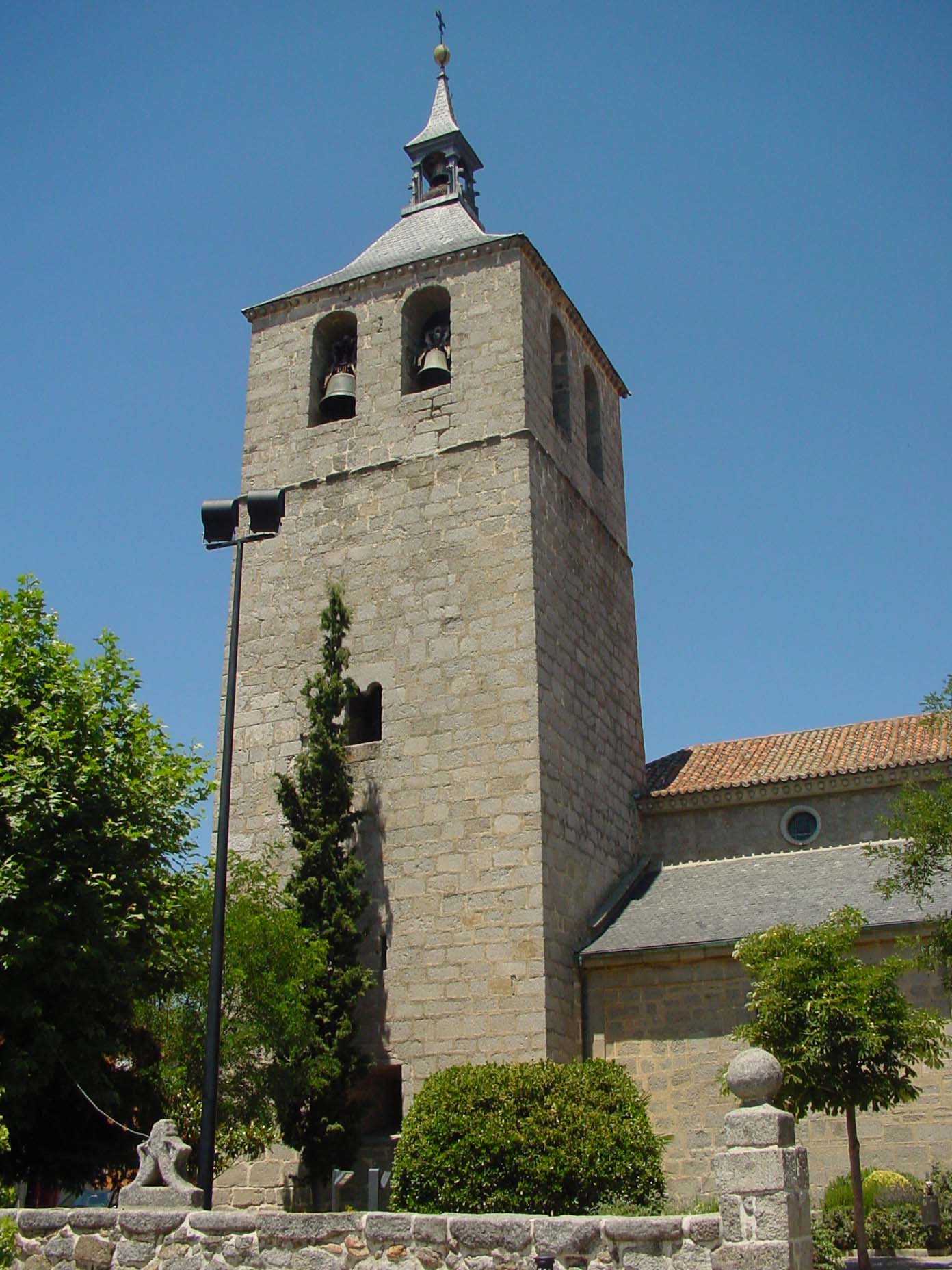

- Location within Spain
- 40.578304°N 4.003857°W
- Location: Galapagar, Spain

Spanish Cultural Heritage
- Official name: Iglesia Parroquial de la Asunción
- Type: Non-movable
- Criteria: Monument
- Designated: 1995
- Reference no.: RI-51-0009122

The Church of la Asunción (Spanish: Iglesia Parroquial de la Asunción) is a church located in Galapagar, Spain. It was declared Bien de Interés Cultural in 1995.
