= Church of La Asunción (Brea de Tajo) =

Cultural property in Brea de Tajo, Spain

- Iglesia Parroquial de La Asunción (Spanish)
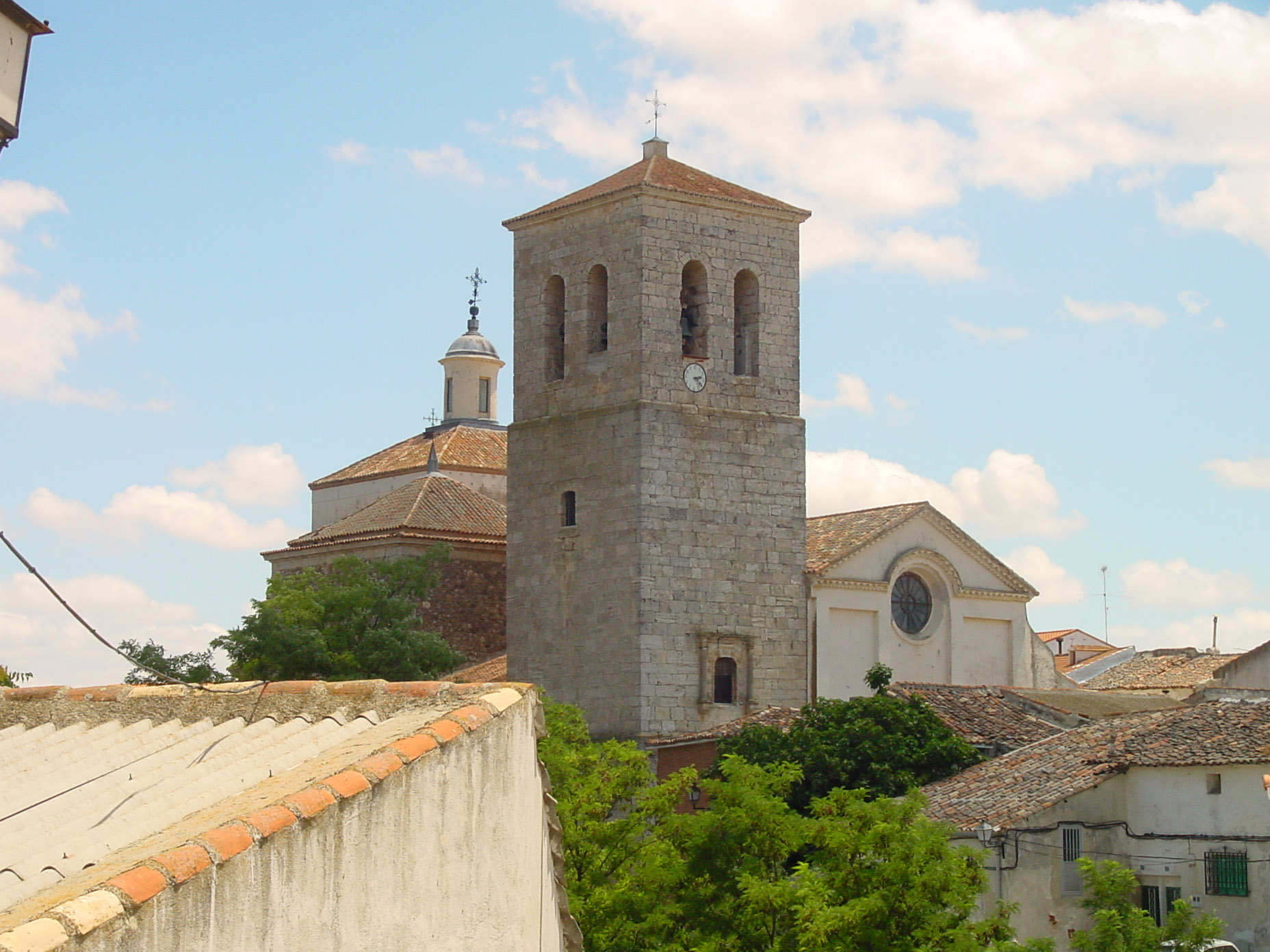

- Location within Community of Madrid Location within Spain
- 40.230084°N 3.107678°W
- Location: Brea de Tajo, Spain

Spanish Cultural Heritage
- Official name: Iglesia Parroquial de La Asunción
- Type: Non-movable
- Criteria: Monument
- Designated: 1997
- Reference no.: RI-51-0010175

The Church of La Asunción (Spanish: Iglesia Parroquial de La Asunción) is a church located in Brea de Tajo, Spain. It was declared Bien de Interés Cultural in 1997.
