= Church of la Asunción (Albacete) =

- Iglesia de la Asunción (Spanish)
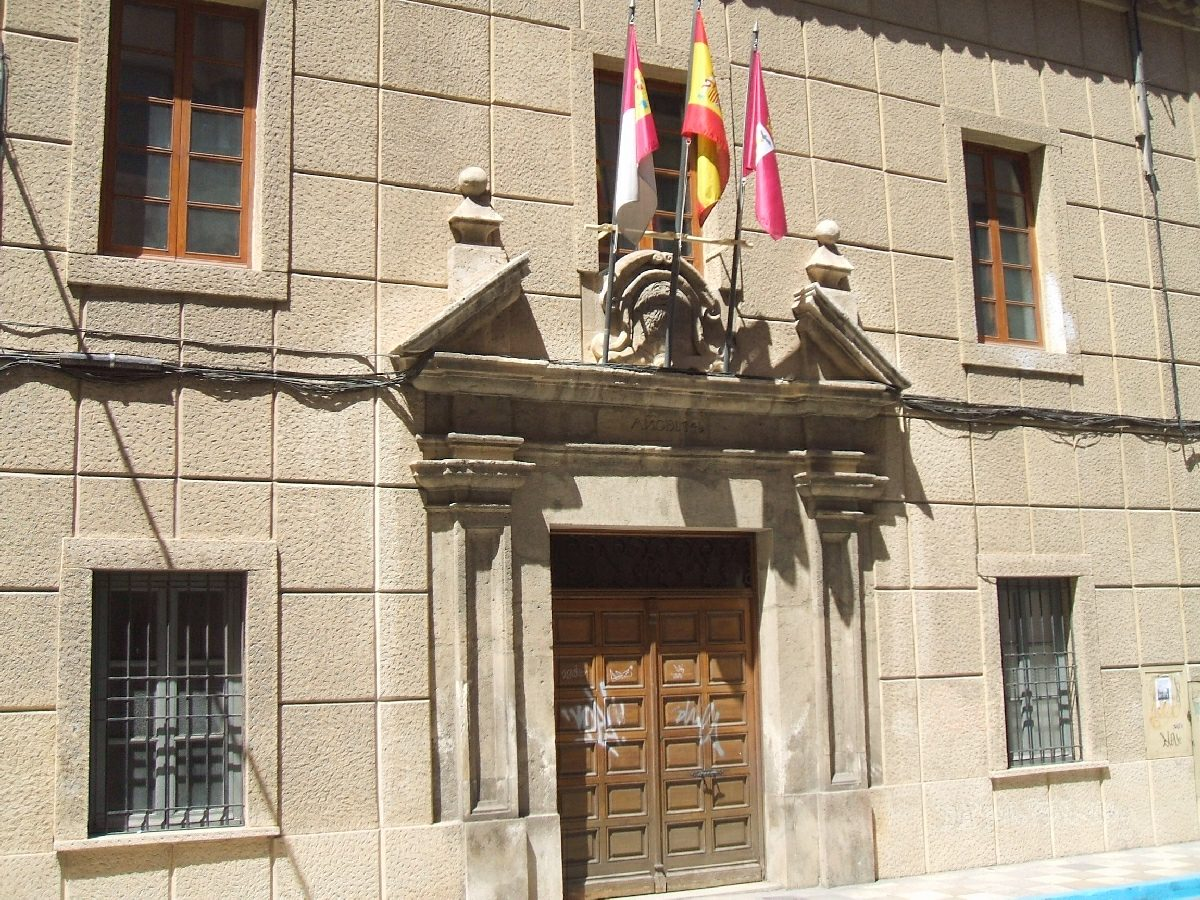

- Location within Spain
- 38.996397°N 1.857301°W
- Location: Albacete, Spain

Spanish Cultural Heritage
- Official name: Iglesia de la Asunción
- Type: Non-movable
- Criteria: Monument
- Designated: 1982
- Reference no.: RI-51-0004242

The Church of la Asunción (Spanish: Iglesia de la Asunción) is a church located in Albacete, Spain. It was declared Bien de Interés Cultural in 1982.
