= List of Bienes de Interés Cultural in the Province of Albacete =

This is a list of Bien de Interés Cultural landmarks in the Province of Albacete, Spain.

- Albacete Provincial Museum
- Alcalá del Júcar
- Aqueduct of Albatana
- Castle of Almansa
- Cathedral of San Juan de Albacete
- Cave of Niño
- Church of la Asunción (Albacete)
- Church of la Asunción (Almansa)
- Church of la Asunción (Hellín)
- Church of la Asunción (Letur)
- Church of la Santísima Trinidad (Alcaraz)
- Church of Espíritu Santo
- Council House of Villarrobledo
- Fair of Albacete
- Monumental Square
- Palace of Condes de Cirat
- Passage of Lodares
- Sanctuary of la Virgen de Gracia
- Sanctuary of Nuestra Señora de los Remedios
- Sanctuary of Santísimo Cristo de la Antigua y Virgen de la Encarnación
