= Leonardo Alagon =

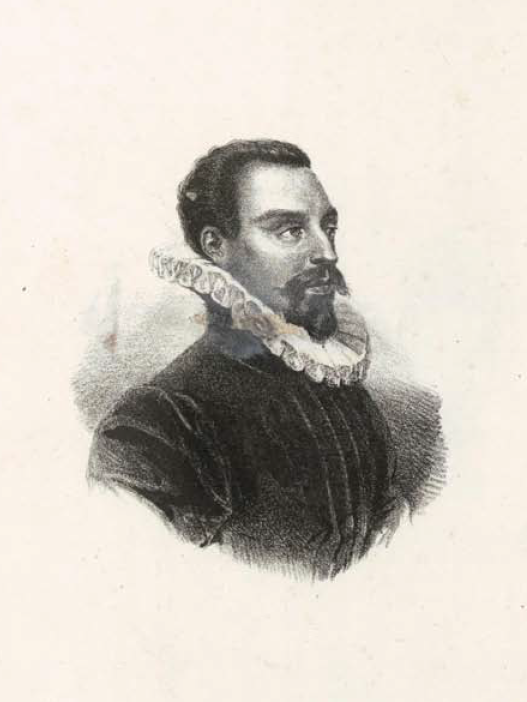
Leonardo Alagon

Leonardo Alagon, even Alagón or de Alagón, (1436 in Oristano – 1494 in Xativa), was the last marquis of Oristano (1470–1478).

== Biography ==
=== Marquis of Oristano and Count of Goceano ===
In 1470, following the death of the Marquis of Oristano Salvatore Cubello (male line descendant from Hugh II of Arborea), the ownership of the estate passed to the heir designated by testamentary act, his nephew Leonardo Alagon, firstborn (eight children) of his sister Benedetta Cubello and the noble Artaldo Alagon y Luna, sir Pina de Ebro, Sástago and other countries. Already Artaldo, descended from the first "ricos hombres" Aragonese, rebelled against the Crown: in 1410 under the command of four ships with Cassiano Doria, stormed Longone defended by the Aragonese. The Marquis Leonardo married Maria Linan de Morillo, from which were born four males, who had no heirs, and two females.

This succession, due to the rebellious behavior of the father of Leonardo, Artaldo, was opposed militarily by the viceroy of Sardinia, Nicolò Carroz d'Arborea, lord of Mandas and Terranova Pausania, who aspired to the possession of that vast territory, asserting that the will had no value, because the king had already decided that after the death of Cubello, the Marquisate of Oristano and the County of Goceano would be incorporated into the Crown of Aragon. The first battle took place April 14, 1470 near Uras, where prevailed the Alagon, while Carroz had to retreat to Cagliari.

In 1474, with the peace treaty of Urgell, King John II of Aragon (called the Great), recognized Leonardo Alagon the right of succession, but the provocative conduct of Carroz did break out again the war. The viceroy did not dare to face his rival in the open field, he went to Barcelona and persuaded the king to proceed against the Marquis on charges of treason and felony and the subsequent confiscation of fiefs and the death penalty. By decree of 1477, the king extended the condemnation to the entire Alagon family.

The conflict also spread to northern areas, where the Alagon had been promised aid by the Genoese and the duke of Milan, but they did not arrive. Instead the Carroz got well-armed troops from Sicily and Naples.

=== Battle of Macomer ===
On 19 May 1478 the army of Alagon was decisively defeated at the Battle of Macomer. Leonardo, before the defeat, left the battlefield and with his brothers, the sons and the Viscount of Sanluri fled to Bosa from where they boarded a ship with the intent to reach Corsica.

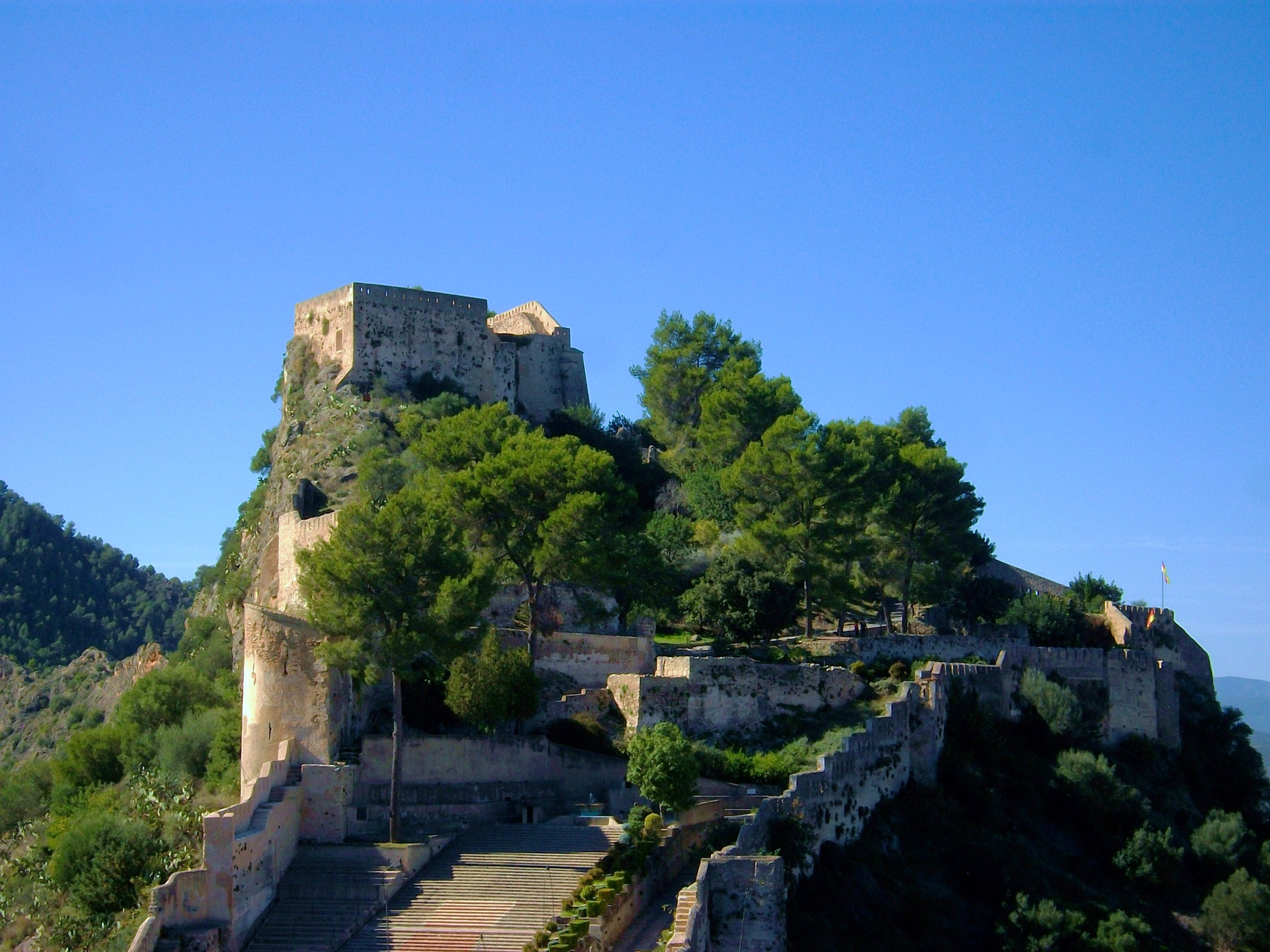
The castle of Xàtiva

Due to a betrayal, the ship reversed his course to Sicily where they were handed over to Admiral Villamarin who, rather than delivering them to the viceroy of Sicily, brought them to Barcelona.

=== Imprisonment and death ===
Later they were imprisoned in the Valencian castle of Xàtiva, where Leonardo and Giovanni de Sena, Viscount of Sanluri, died in 1494. According to the writer Peter Carboni, their death was caused by grief and deep moral pain for the sad events experienced: they were buried in an underground cemetery of the Xativa castle.

== Bibliography ==
- AA. VV., Giudicato d'Arborea e Marchesato di Oristano: proiezioni mediterranee e aspetti di storia locale, S'Alvure, Oristano 2000.
- Proto Arca Sardo, De bello et interitu Marchionis Oristanei, a cura di Maria Teresa Laneri, CUEC, Cagliari 2003.
- Giovanni Boassa, Due battaglie che cambiarono il destino della Sardegna, PTM, Mogoro 2012.
- Pietro Carboni, La battaglia di Macomer, La Biblioteca della Nuova Sardegna, Sassari 2013.
- Id., Leonardo Alagon, 2 vol., La Biblioteca della Nuova Sardegna, Sassari 2013.
- Raimondo Carta Raspi, Storia della Sardegna, Mursia, Milano 1974.
- Goffredo Casalis, Vittorio Angius, Dizionario Geografico Storico, Statistico, Commerciale Degli Stati Di S.M. il Re Di Sardegna, Kessinger Publishing, ISBN 978-11-682-6643-9, 2010, pp. 584.
- Alessandra Cioppi, Battaglie e protagonisti della Sardegna medioevale, AM-D, Cagliari 2008.
- Franco Cuccu, La città dei Giudici, vol. I, S'Alvure, Oristano 1996.
- Francesco Floris, Storia della Sardegna, Newton & Compton, Roma 2007.
- Onnis, Omar; Mureddu, Manuelle (2019). Illustres. Vita, morte e miracoli di quaranta personalità sarde (in Italian). Sestu: Domus de Janas. ISBN 978-88-97084-90-7. OCLC 1124656644.
- Carlos Sarthou Carreres, El castillo de Jàtiva y sus històricos prisioneros, E.P.V., Valencia 1951.
- Arnaldo Satta-Branca, La Sardegna attraverso i secoli, Fossataro, Cagliari 1966.
- Mirella Scarpa Senes, La guerra e la disfatta del Marchese di Oristano dal manoscritto di G. Proto Arca, ed. Castello, Cagliari 1997.
- Giovanni Serra, Villasor, <Parte Ippis>, Grafica del Parteolla, Dolianova 1995.
