= Albareda =

Albareda is a Spanish and Catalan surname. Notable people with the surname include:

- Joaquim Albareda (born 1957), Spanish historian
- Joaquín Albareda y Ramoneda (1892–1966), Spanish cardinal
- José Luis Albareda y Sezde (1828–1897), Spanish politician and journalist
- José María Albareda (1902–1966), Spanish scientist
