= Battle of Almansa reenactment =

Annual event in Almansa, Spain

Battle of Almansa reenactment Recreación de la Batalla de Almansa
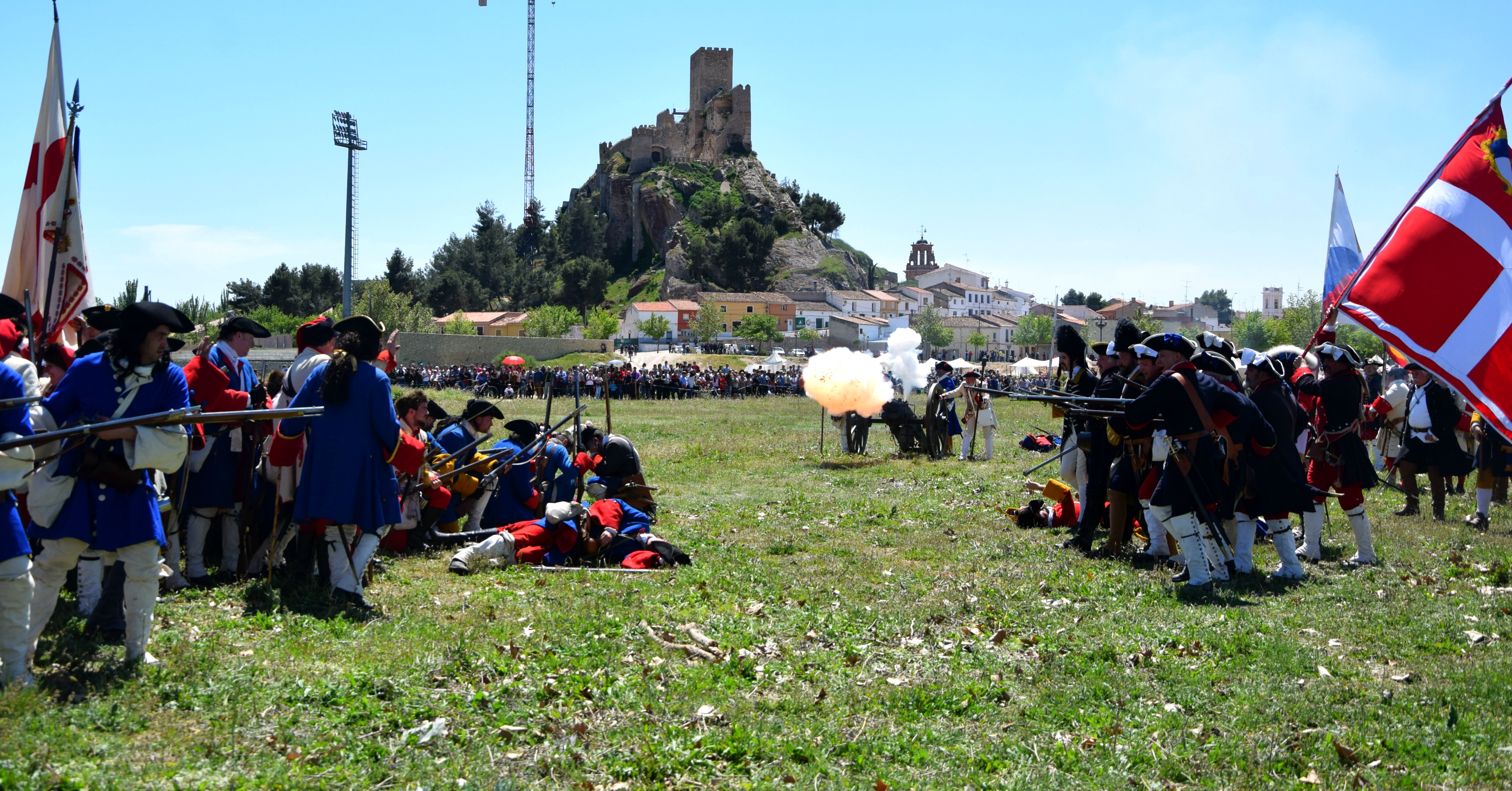
- 2017 reenactment
- Frequency: Annually or bi-annually
- Location: Almansa
- Coordinates: 38.8732505°N 1.0957527°W
- Country: Spain
- Website: www.1707.es

The Battle of Almansa reenactment is an annual modern recreation of the Battle of Almansa in 1707. This took place in Almansa, Spain, during the War of the Spanish Succession. The event is organized by the Asociación 1707 Almansa Historica.
