= Siege of Xàtiva (1707) =

Battle in the War of the Spanish Succession

Coordinates: 38.9903°N 0.5211°W

- Part of the War of the Spanish Succession
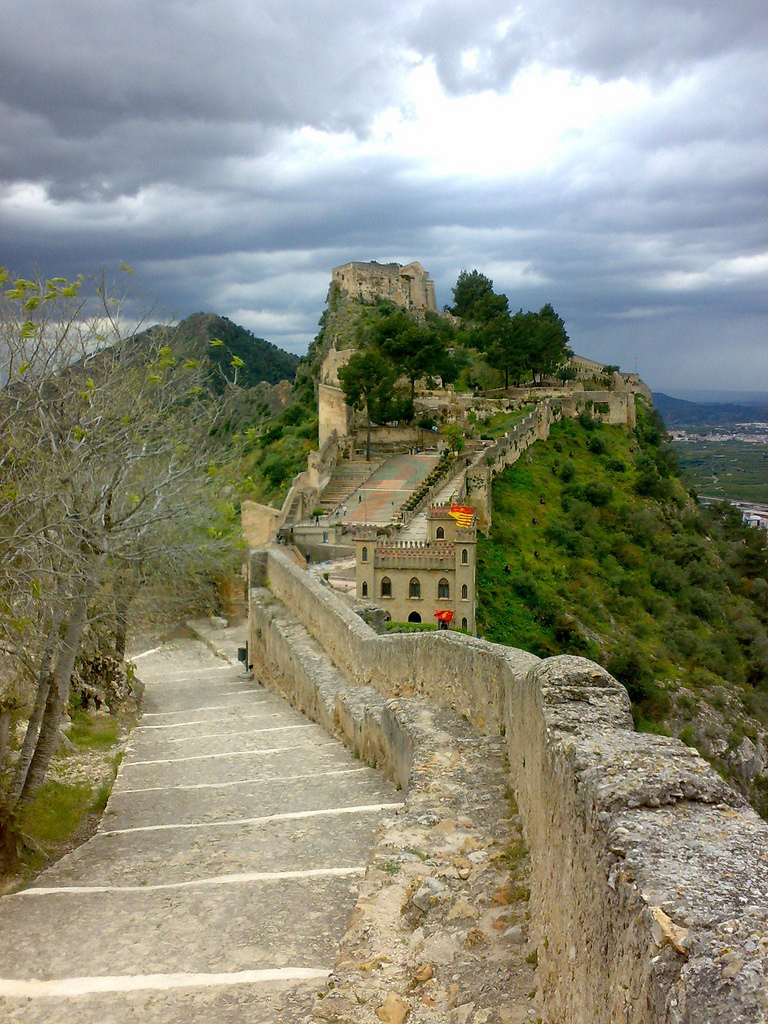
- Xátiva Castle
Date	8 May - 6 June 1707
Location	Xàtiva, Kingdom of Valencia, Spain
Result	Franco-Spanish victory

Belligerents
Spain (Kingdom of France) France	Crown of Aragon; England

Commanders and leaders
(Kingdom of France) Claude Bidal d'Asfeld (Spain) José Chaves Osorio	Miguel Purroi; Josep Marco

Strength
9,000 to 11,000	2,000

Casualties and losses
unknown	high. Also many civilians.

The Siege of Xàtiva was a siege of Xàtiva in the Kingdom of Valencia. It took place between 8 May and 6 June 1707 during the War of the Spanish Succession.

== The Siege ==
On 25 April 1707, the Franco-Spanish army had gained a decisive victory at the Battle of Almansa. In the weeks following the battle, the neighboring cities under allied control were recaptured one by one.

Between 9,000 and 11,000 Castilan and French troops supporting King Philip V of Spain, commanded by Claude François Bidal d'Asfeld and José Antonio de Chaves Osorio, besieged Xàtiva, defended by an Aragonese and British force of about 2,000 under Miguel Purroi and Josep Marco.

The Franco-Castilan forces were victorious and the city's defenders were massacred as an exemplary punishment. The British soldiers were spared and allowed to leave the city. Most of the rest of the town's inhabitants were deported to the La Mancha region and the city was burned down and renamed 'San Felipe'..

In reference to this episode in their history, Xàtiva's inhabitants are nicknamed socarrats ('grilled people').
