= Xativa Castle =

Castle in the province of Valencia, Spain

Coordinates: 38°58′58.57″N 0°31′7.34″W

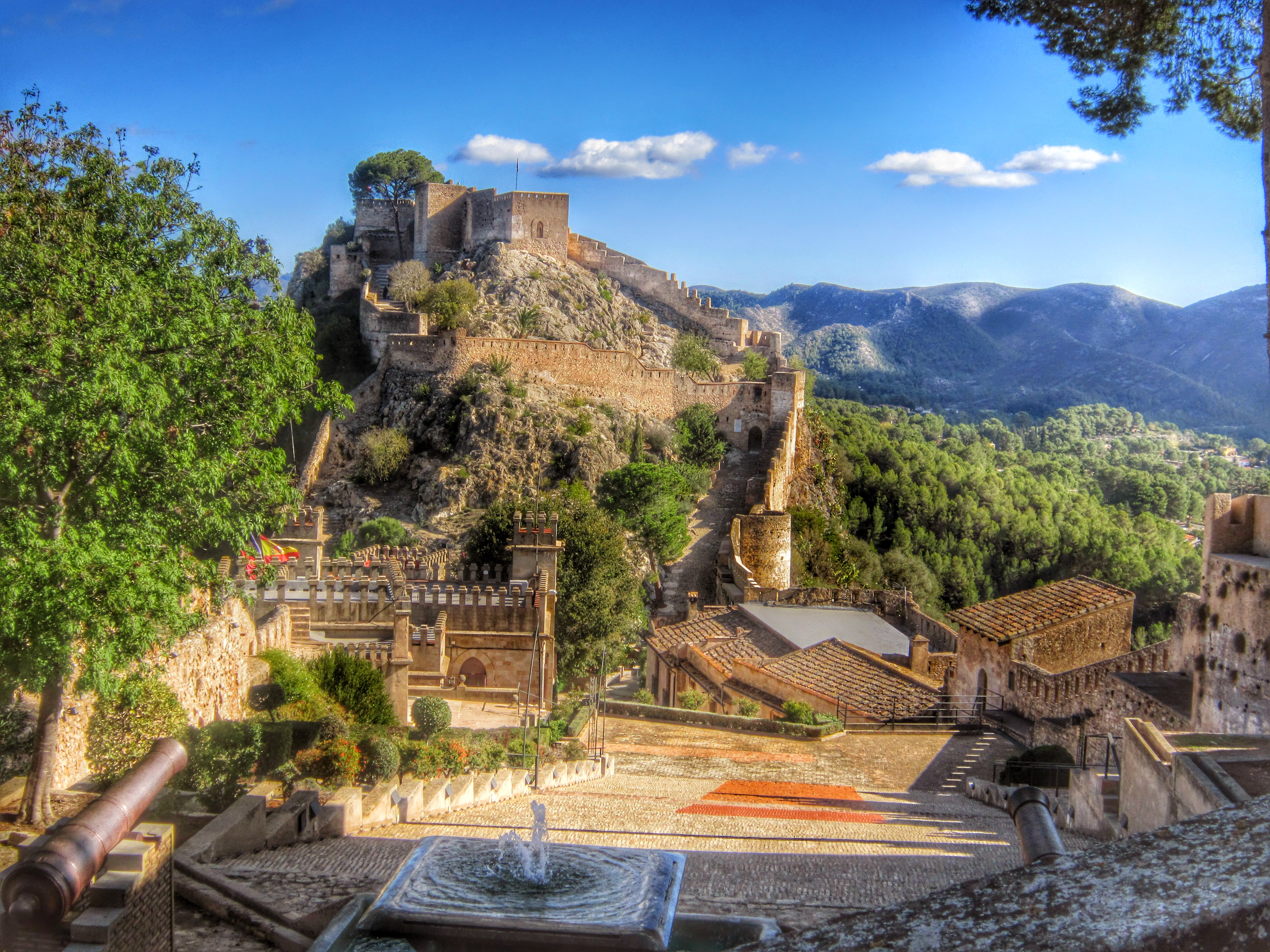
The "Castillo Menor" as seen from the "Castillo Mayor".

Xativa Castle (Spanish: Castillo de Játiva; Valencian: Castell de Xàtiva) is a castle located in the city of Xàtiva near Valencia, Spain. It consists of a twin fortification divided between the older "Castillo Menor" (minor castle), built on the Iberian and Roman remains of the site, and the more recent "Castillo Mayor" (main castle), built during the medieval period. It sits at a height of 310 meters above the modern-day city. It featured in the Star Wars series Andor.

== History ==
The fortress is strategically located on the ancient roadway Via Augusta leading from Rome across the Pyrenees and down the Mediterranean coast to Cartagena and Cádiz.

The minor castle was originally a Celtiberian stronghold and was then taken by the Carthaginians in the third century BC. It is said to be the place where Hannibal planned the conquest of the Roman city of Saguntum, as well as where his son was born in 218 BC. It was later conquered by the Roman Scipio.

In the medieval period, in 1092, the castle fell to the Almoravid dynasty who were later pushed out in an uprising that took place in 1145. During this uprising, the castle was besieged by the ruler of Valencia, Marwan Abd-al-Aziz. In 1171, the castle finally joined, along with the rest of the Levante coast, the hands of the Almohads.

King James I of Aragon began his religious conquest there in the summer of 1239, capturing Xátiva on 22 May 1244, following a five-month siege. After surrendering to the Christian monarch, avoiding more bloodshed and signing the Treaty of Xàtiva, the Governor handed over the smaller nearby castle to James I, while the moors were allowed to continue occupying the larger castle for another two years, based on the terms of the treaty.

After the two years had elapsed, King James I of Aragon forcibly repopulated a large part of the town with Catalan and Aragonese settlers, meanwhile slaughtering and expelling a portion of the Muslim and Jewish populations from the city. In the subsequent decades, many Mudéjar (Muslims living under Christian rule after the Reconquista) left the region for Granada or North Africa.

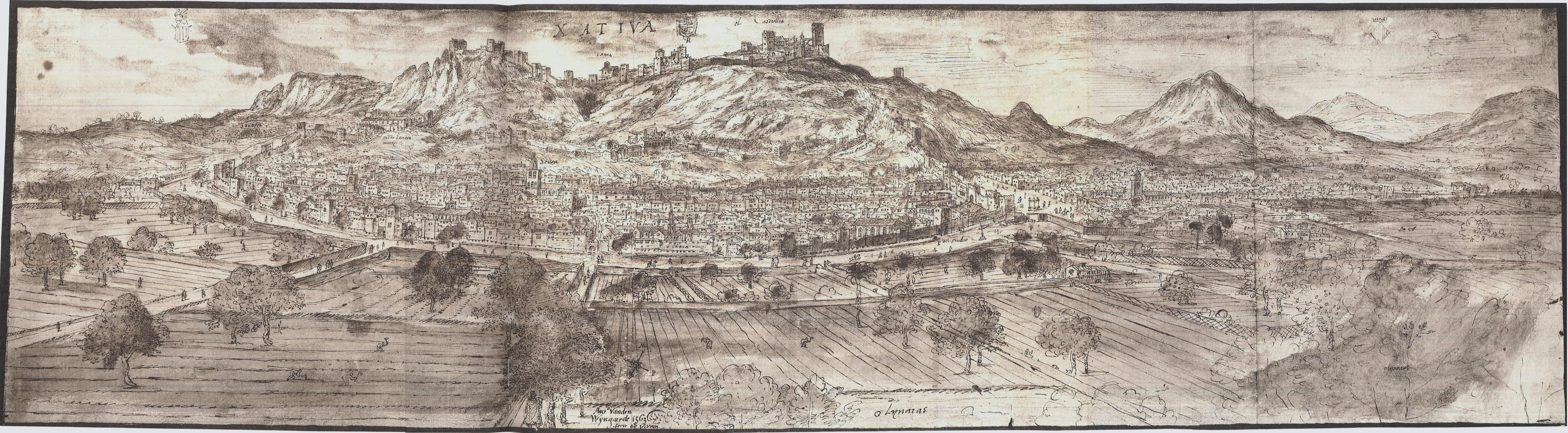
"Xàtiva" by Anton van den Wijngaerde, 1563. The twin castles can be seen on the hill overlooking the city.

The castle once again saw fighting during the war of the Spanish succession, as Castilan and French troops beat Aragonese and English troops that had taken refuge in the fortress during the siege of Xàtiva, in 1707. The site was later seriously damaged in the 1748 earthquake that rocked the region, and it lost its strategic importance.
