= Buonaventura Ligli =

Italian painter (1688–1732)

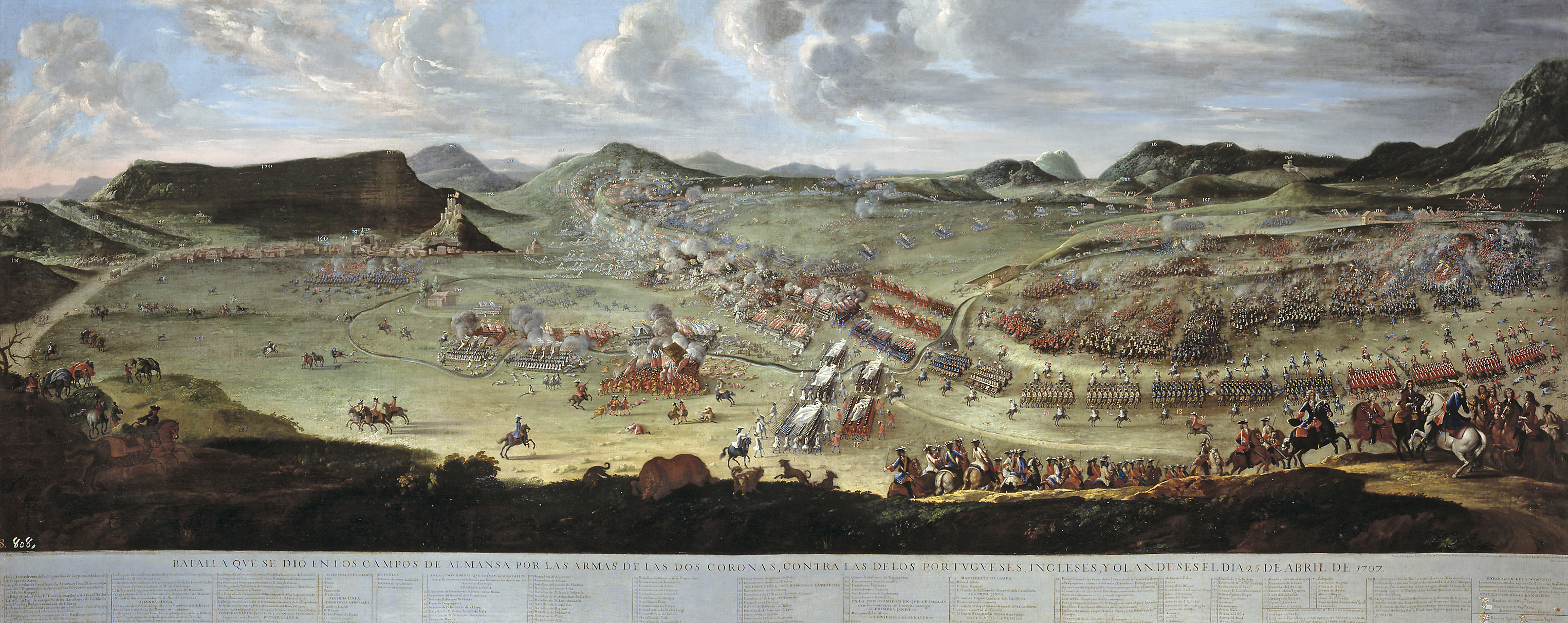
The Battle of Almansa, 1709. Prado Museum, Madrid.

Buonaventura Ligli, known in Spain as Ventura Lirios (Verona 1688 - Zamora 1732) was an Italian painter, active in Naples and Madrid. He was a pupil of Luca Giordano in Naples, and went to Spain, where he was called Lirios. By 1682 he was living in Madrid, where he painted the Battle of Almansa. Madrid is where the painting is located today.
