= Palace of Condes de Cirat (Almansa) =

Palace of the Condes de Cirat
- Palacio de los Condes de Cirat (Spanish)
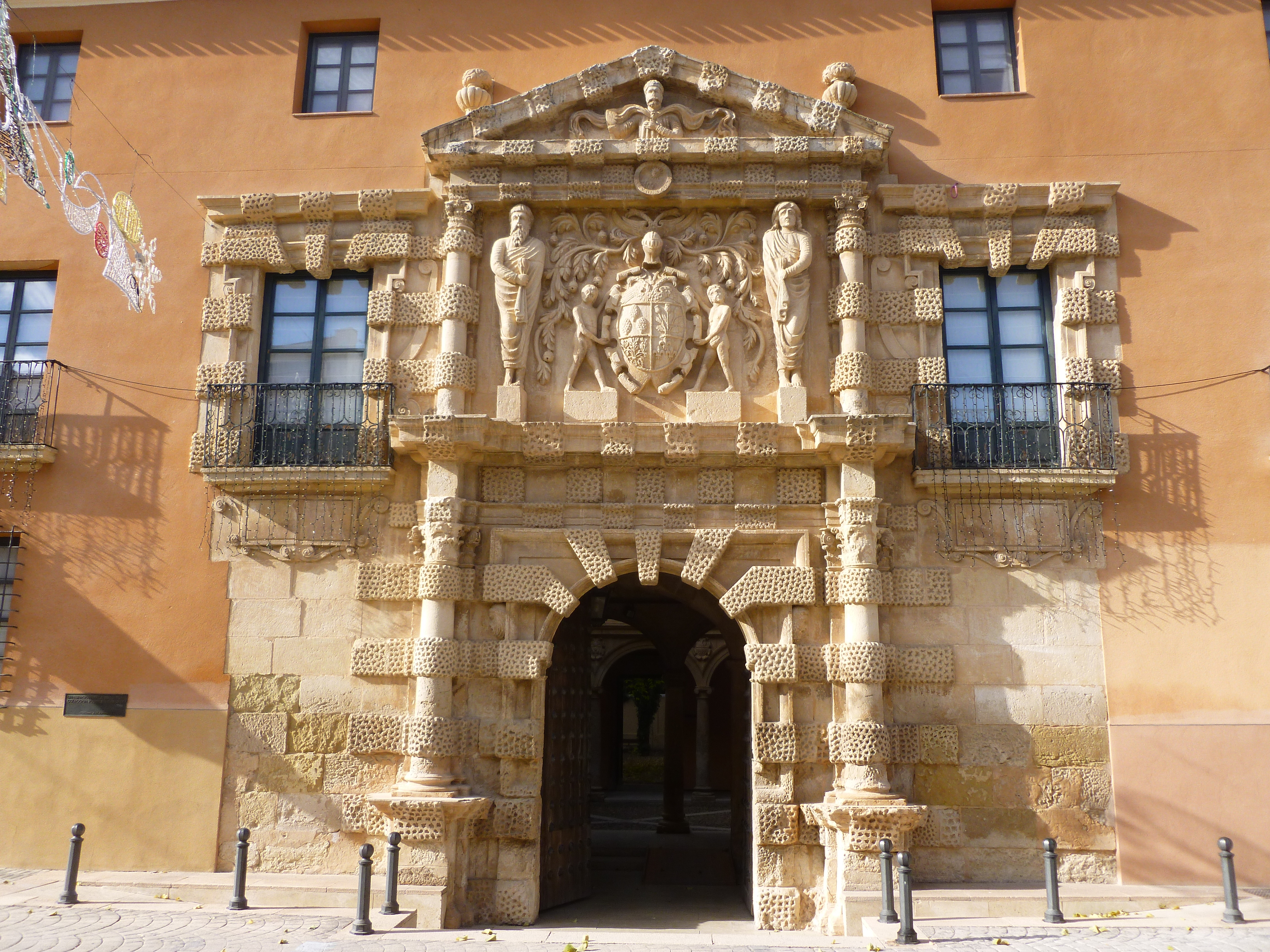

- Location within Spain
- 38.870078°N 1.093532°W
- Location: Almansa, Spain

Spanish Cultural Heritage
- Official name: Palacio de los Condes de Cirat
- Type: Non-movable
- Criteria: Monument
- Designated: 1990
- Reference no.: RI-51-0006984

The Palace of the Condes de Cirat (Spanish: Palacio de los Condes de Cirat) is a palace located in Almansa, Spain. It was declared Bien de Interés Cultural in 1990.
