= Almansa =

- Municipality
- Coat of arms

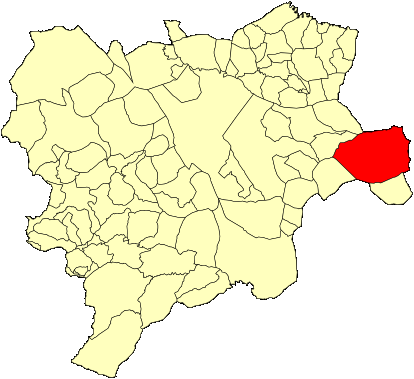
- location in Albacete

- Location in Albacete Location in Castilla-La Mancha Location in Spain
- Coordinates: 38°52′06.1″N 1°05′40.4″W
- Country: Spain
- Autonomous community: Castilla–La Mancha
- Province: Albacete
- Comarca: Altiplanicie de Almansa
- Judicial district: Almansa
- Commonwealth: Monte Ibérico–Corredor de Almansa

Government
  - Mayor: Javier Sánchez Roselló (PP)

Area
  - Total: 531.91 km^{2} (205.37 sq mi)
- Elevation: 712 m (2,336 ft)

Population (2025-01-01)
  - Total: 24,615
  - Density: 46.277/km^{2} (119.86/sq mi)
- Demonym: Almanseños
- Time zone: UTC+1 (CET)
  - Summer (DST): UTC+2 (CEST)
- Postal code: 02640
- Dialing code: 967
- Website: Official website

Almansa (Spanish pronunciation: [alˈmansa]) is a Spanish town and municipality in the province of Albacete, part of the autonomous community of Castile-La Mancha. The name "Almansa" stems from the Arabic المنصف (al-manṣaf), "half way of the road". The municipality borders with Alicante, Valencia and Murcia. Almansa is famous for its Moros y cristianos festival celebrated from 1 to 6 May.

Almansa is built at the foot of a white limestone crag, which is surmounted by a Moorish castle, and rises abruptly in the midst of a fertile and irrigated plain. About 1 mile (1.6 km) south of the town centre stands an obelisk commemorating the Battle of Almansa fought there on 25 April 1707 during the War of Spanish Succession, in which a French, Spanish and Irish army under command of the duke of Berwick, a natural son of James II, routed the allied British, Portuguese and Spanish troops. Annual reenactments of that battle have been formally listed in the Spanish cultural register.

The Sierra del Mugrón is located within the Almansa city limits.

== Main sights ==
The main sightseeing attraction is the 14th-century Castle of Almansa.

There are other important monuments, such as:

- Church of la Asunción (16th-19th century)
- Palace of Los Condes de Cirat (16th century), today the Town Hall
- Church of the Agustinas Convent (18th century)
- The Convent of San Francisco (17th century)
- Clock Tower (1780)

8 km from the city is the reservoir of Almansa, built in 1584. This reservoir is the oldest one in Europe. 12 km from the city is the Sanctuary of Our Lady of Belen (17th century).

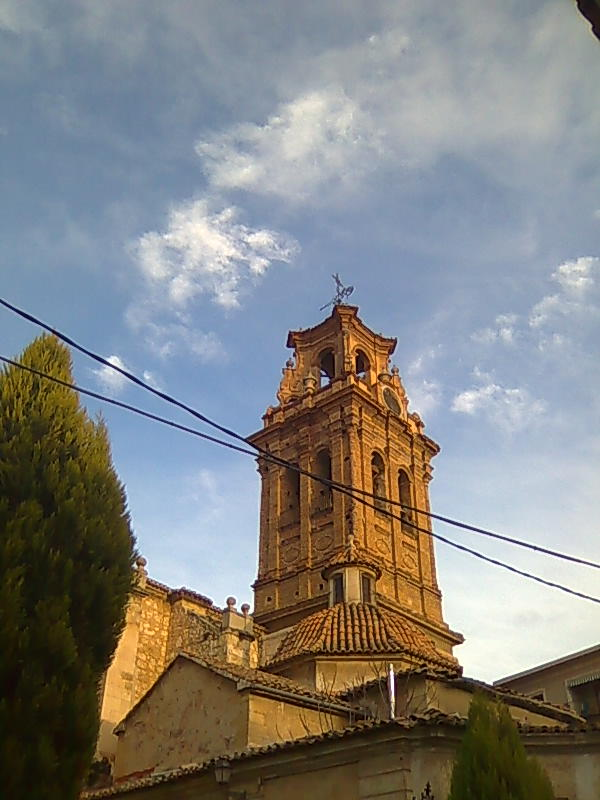
La Asuncion church's bell tower.

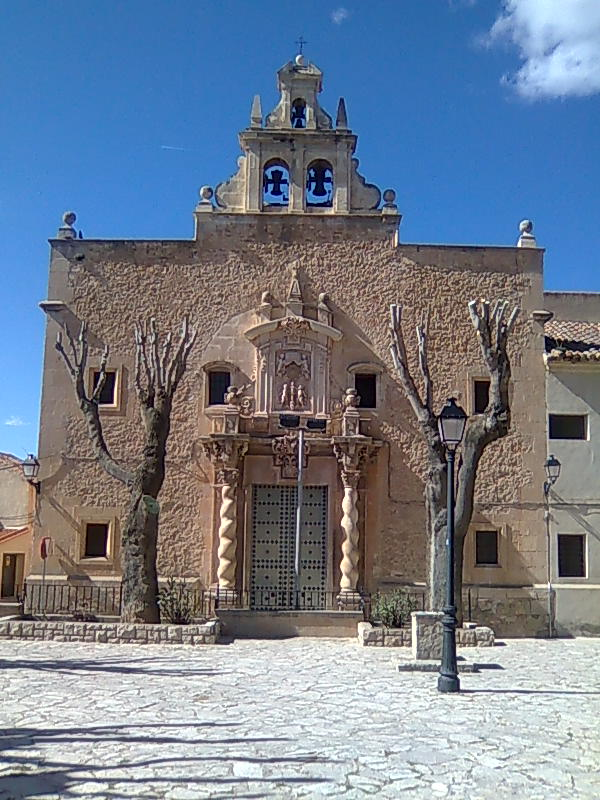
Convent of San Agustin

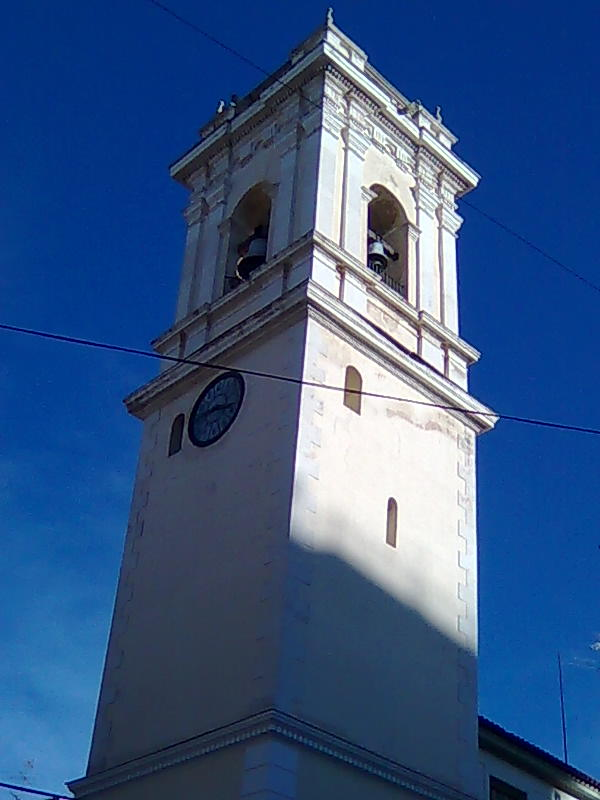
Clock tower

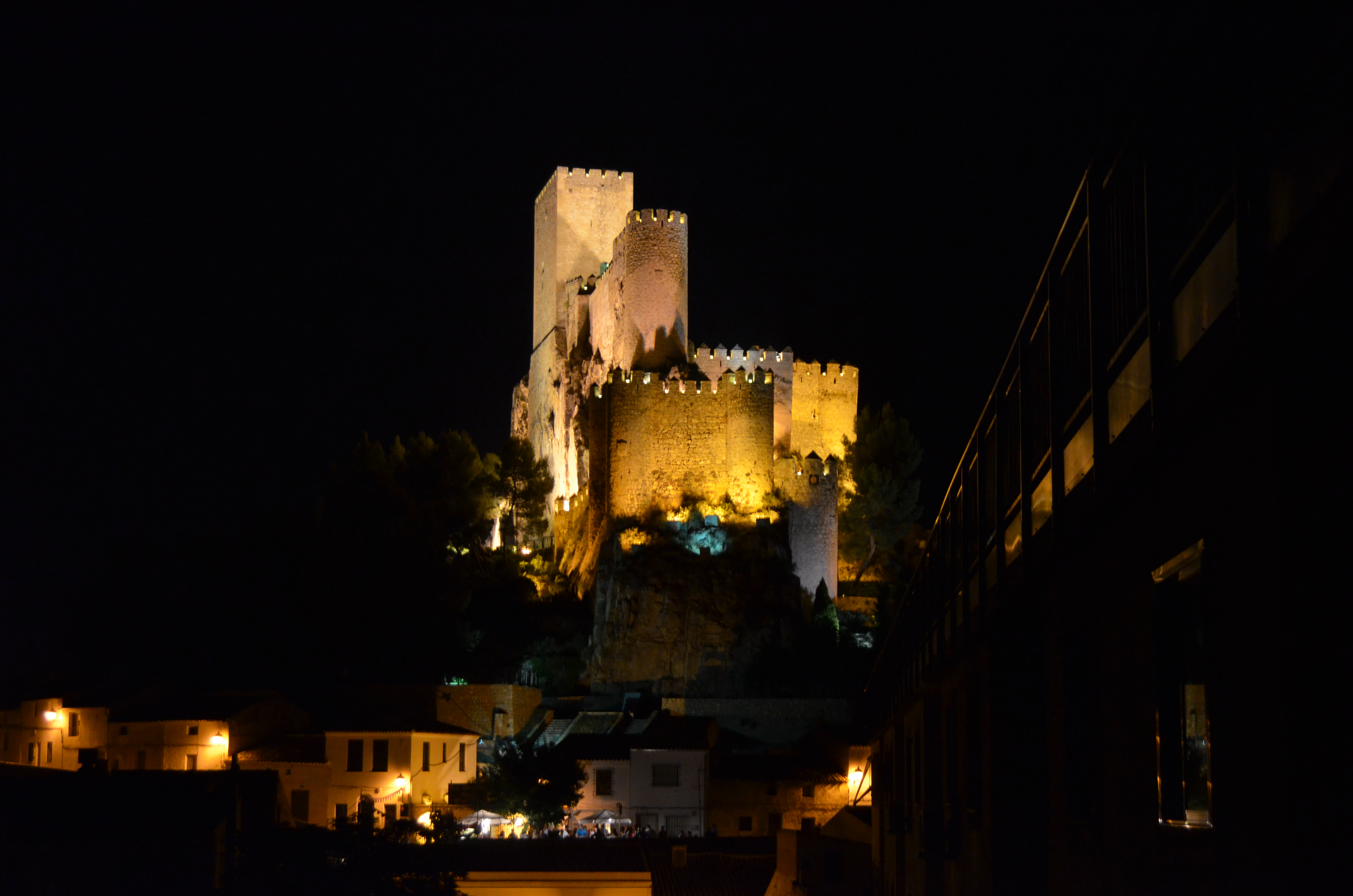
The medieval 'Castle of Almansa'.

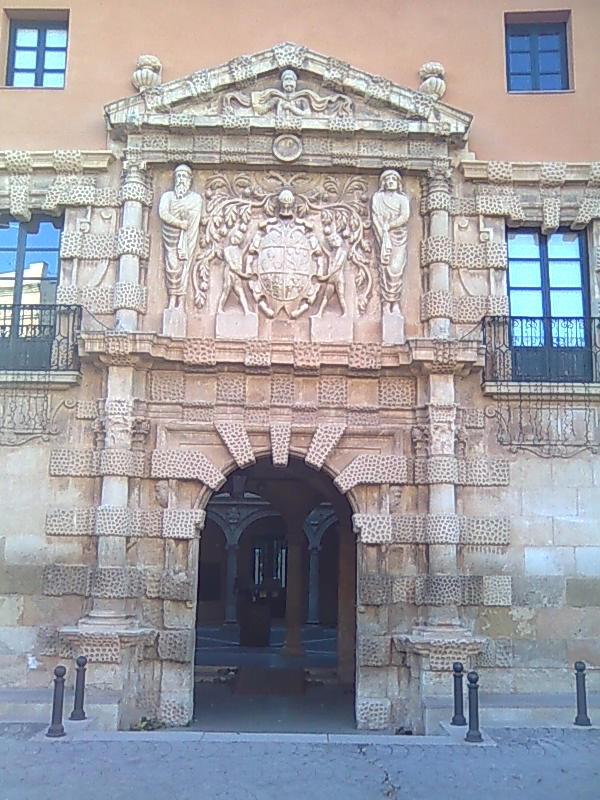
Facade of the City hall

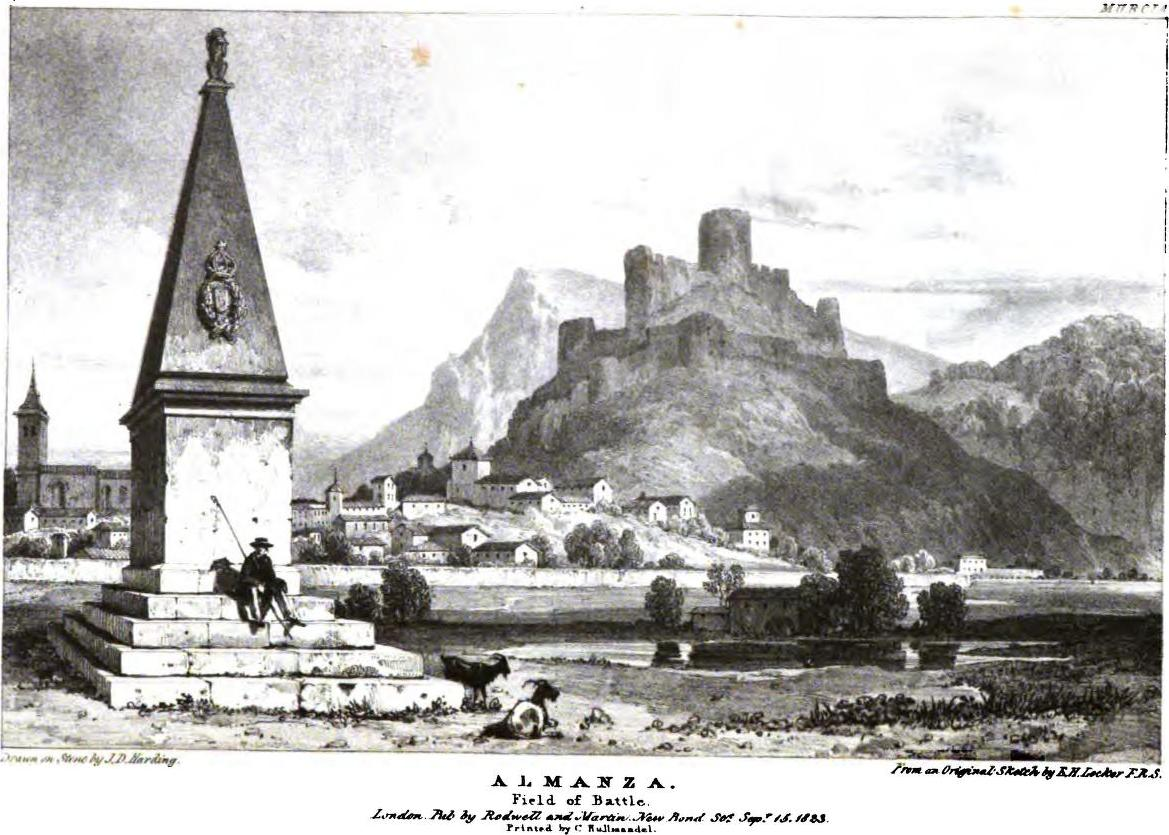
Almansa in 1823 by Edward Hawke Locker

== Camino de Santiago ==
Two pilgrim routes on the Camino de Santiago meet in Almansa. From the south comes the Camino de la Lana and from the east, the Camino de Levante. The Camino de la Lana joins Alicante with Burgos, and the Camino de Levante joins Valencia with Zamora.

== Past residents ==
Santiago Bernabéu de Yeste (8 June 1895 – 2 June 1978) - The 11th President of Real Madrid - Bernabéu was born in Montealegre del Castillo (named simply Montealegre before 1916), in the province of Albacete, Spain. However, he was registered at his parents' home in the near town Almansa, where his family lived. His family moved to Madrid when he was very young, and Bernabéu himself joined the Real Madrid junior ranks in 1909 at age 14, after being a regular spectator at their matches for years.

== See also ==
- Almanza in the province of León
