= Claude François Bidal d'Asfeld =

French Marshal of France

Marshal of France Claude François Bidal d'Asfeld Marquis d'Asfeld
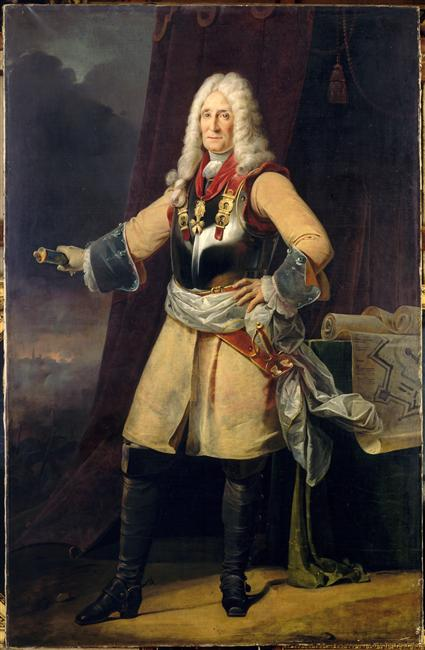
- Portrait by Henri Frédéric Schopin, 1835
- Born: 2 July 1665; Paris, France
- Died: 7 March 1743 (aged 77) Paris, France
- Allegiance: Kingdom of France
- Branch: (Kingdom of France) French Army
- Rank: Marshal of France
- Conflicts: War of the Spanish Succession: Battle of Almansa; Siege of Barcelona; War of the Polish Succession
- Awards: Order of Saint Louis; Order of the Golden Fleece

Claude François Bidal, marquis d'Asfeld (Paris, 2 July 1665 – Paris, 7 March 1743) was a French Marshal of France.

== Biography ==
He was the son of Pierre Bidal (1612–1690), a French merchant and banker who did business with Christina of Sweden.
He received from her the title of Baron of Harsefeld in Bremen, then in Swedish hands, when he was French ambassador in Hamburg.

When Christina abdicated her throne on 5 June 1654 in favour of her cousin Karl Gustavus in order to practice openly her Catholicism, she went to live in France, in a beautiful estate at Vanves, possession of Pierre Bidal.

The title Baron of Harsefeld was transformed to Asfeld in French and passed over from Pierre to Claude François.

Claude François became maréchal de camp in 1702, lieutenant general in 1704 and commander in the Order of Saint-Louis in 1707.

He played a major role in the War of Spanish Succession in Spain, under Berwick. He fought in the Battle of Almansa (1707), the conquest of Tortosa and Alicante, the Siege of Barcelona (1714) and the capitulation of Mallorca (1715).

After the war, he was made Marquis d'Asfeld en Castille by King Philip V of Spain and knight in the Order of the Golden Fleece.

He was director-general of the French fortifications in 1715, member of the War council, military commander first in the Guyenne province (1719), later in Italy (1733).
When Berwick was killed in the War of the Polish Succession by a cannonball at the siege of Philippsburg in 1734, Asfeld became commander-in-chief of the army of the Rhine. He was made Marshal of France in 1734.

In 1728, he bought the domain and title of Count d’Avaux.

He married in 1717 Jeanne Louise Joly de Fleury, who died seven months later of smallpox.
He remarried in 1718 with Anne Leclerc de Lesseville, who died in 1728 in childbirth. They had five children.
