= Monumental Square (Alcaraz) =

- Plaza Monumental (Spanish)
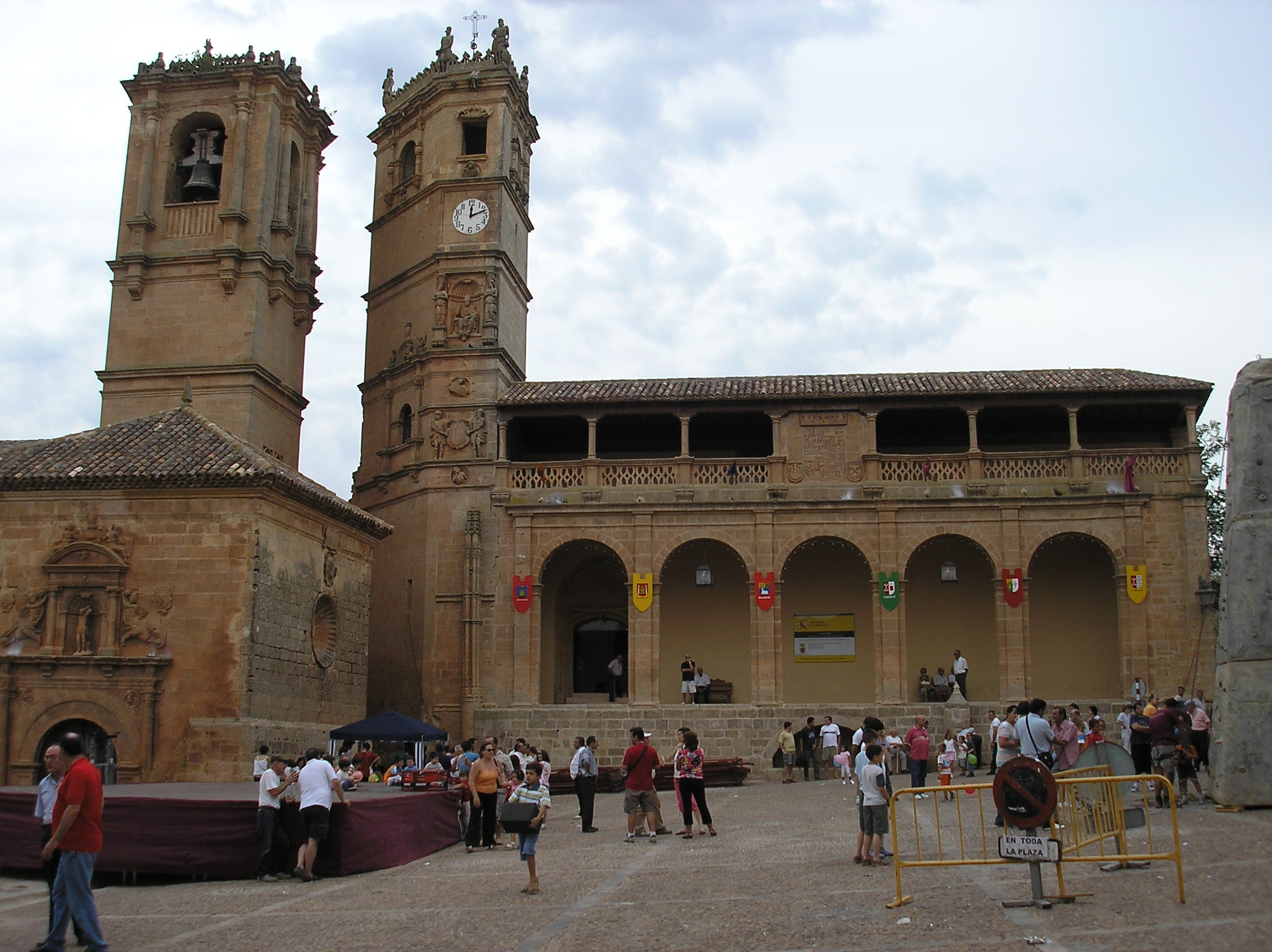

- Location within Spain
- 38.664846°N 2.491103°W
- Location: Alcaraz, Spain

Spanish Cultural Heritage
- Official name: Plaza Monumental
- Type: Non-movable
- Criteria: Monument
- Designated: 1945
- Reference no.: RI-51-0001173

The Monumental Square (Spanish: Plaza Monumental) is a square located in Alcaraz, Spain. It was declared Bien de Interés Cultural in 1945. It was intended to create a large market area for Alcaraz.
