= Church of la Asunción (Almansa) =

- Iglesia Arciprestal de la Asunción (Spanish)
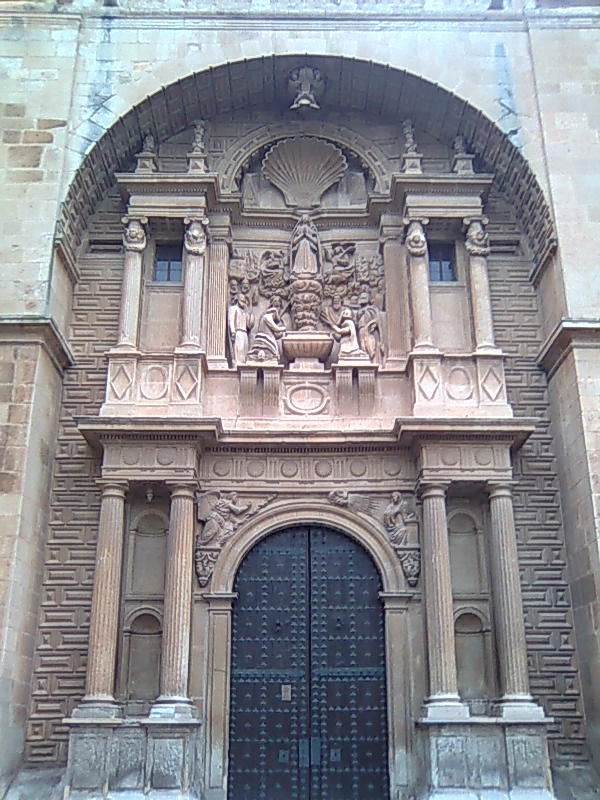

- Location within Spain
- 38.869852°N 1.093968°W
- Location: Almansa, Spain

Spanish Cultural Heritage
- Official name: Iglesia Arciprestal de la Asunción
- Type: Non-movable
- Criteria: Monument
- Designated: 1983
- Reference no.: RI-51-0004848

The Church of la Asunción (Spanish: Iglesia Arciprestal de la Asunción) is a Roman Catholic church located in Almansa, province of Albacete Spain.

Construction of the church at this site in the then-expanding town was chosen in 1524. A number of architects including maestro Marquina, Maestro Pedro, Maestro Juan de Aranguren, Juanes de Segura, and Juan de Urrea took the work to 1579. The late-Renaissance portal has a relief depicting the Annunciation and Assumption of the Virgin. The façade was started in 1619-1624 by Francisco de Figuerola. Work continued on the sacristy, various chapels, and the bell-tower into the later half of the 18th century. From 1789 to 1805, Bartolomé Rivelles worked on the apse. The interior was decorated in Neoclassical style. Restoration took place in the 1980s.

It was declared Bien de Interés Cultural in 1983.
