= Passage of Lodares =

- Pasaje de Lodares (Spanish)
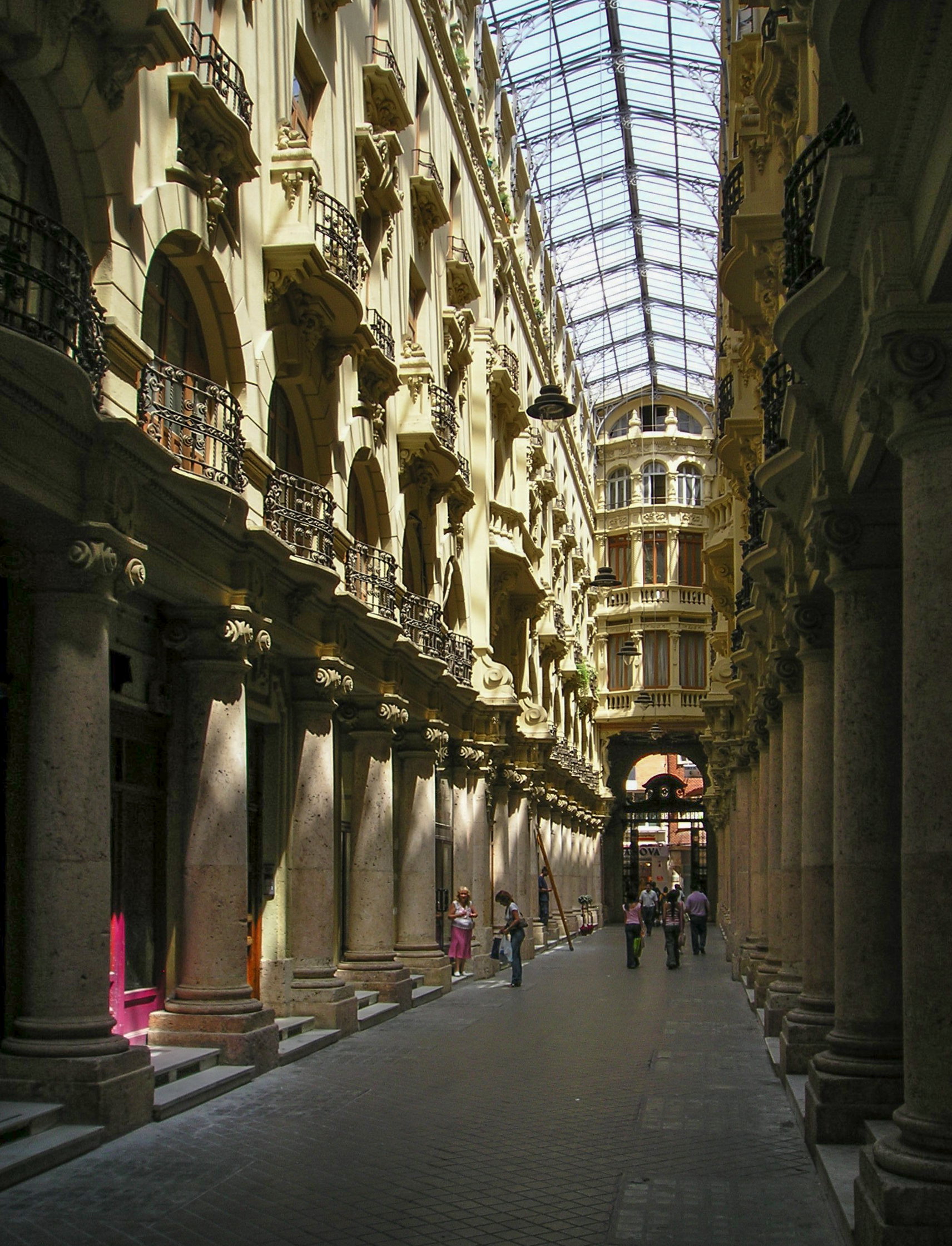

- Location within Spain
- 38.993234°N 1.855805°W
- Location: Albacete, Spain

Spanish Cultural Heritage
- Official name: Pasaje de Lodares
- Type: Non-movable
- Criteria: Monument
- Designated: 1996
- Reference no.: RI-51-0005451

The Passage of Lodares (Spanish: Pasaje de Lodares) is a shopping arcade located in Albacete, Spain. It was declared Bien de Interés Cultural in 1996.
