= Monte Ibérico-Corredor de Almansa =

Coordinates: 38°52′50″N 1°29′14″W

Monte Ibérico–Corredor de Almansa is a comarca of the Province of Albacete, Spain.
