= Castle of Almansa =

- Castillo de Almansa
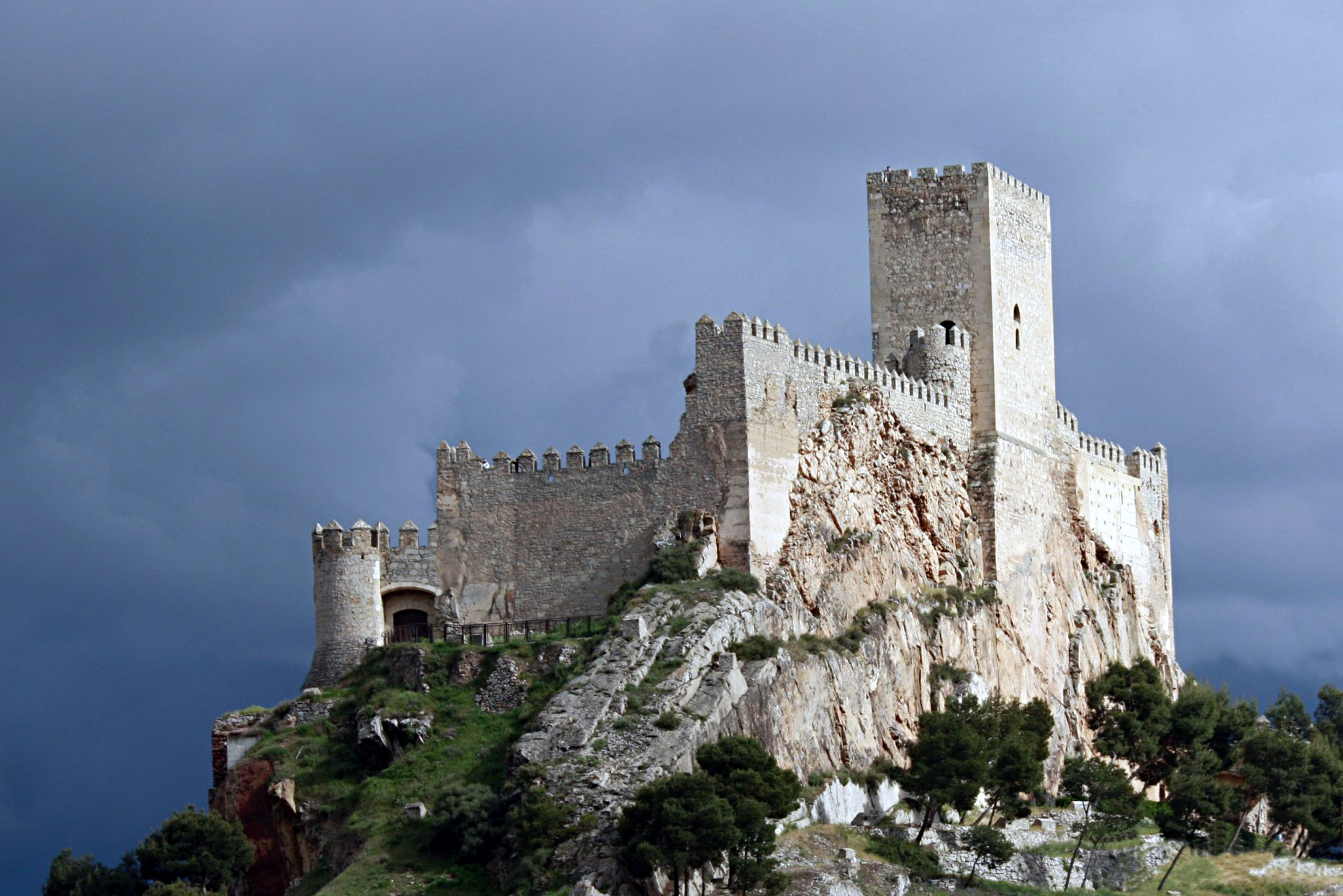

General information
- Type: Castle
- Location: Almansa, Castilla–La Mancha, Spain
- Coordinates: 38.871473°N 1.093356°W

Spanish Cultural Heritage
- Type: Non-movable
- Criteria: Monument
- Designated: 1921
- Reference no.: RI-51-0000190

The Castle of Almansa (Spanish: Castillo de Almansa) is a castle located in Almansa, Spain, Province of Albacete. It was declared Bien de Interés Cultural in 1921.

== History ==
The original construction may have been made by the Almohads, who often used the rammed earth technique for their defensive buildings. However, the remains of rammed earth walls preserved in this castle, traditionally interpreted as dating from the Almohad period, were built during the first decades of Christian rule, at the end of the 13th century or beginning of the 14th century, as demonstrated by the various analyses carried out in 2008 on the occasion of its restoration.

== Access ==
The monument is accessed from the Plaza de Santa María, via a wide flight of steps. At the top of these steps is the municipality's Tourist Office.

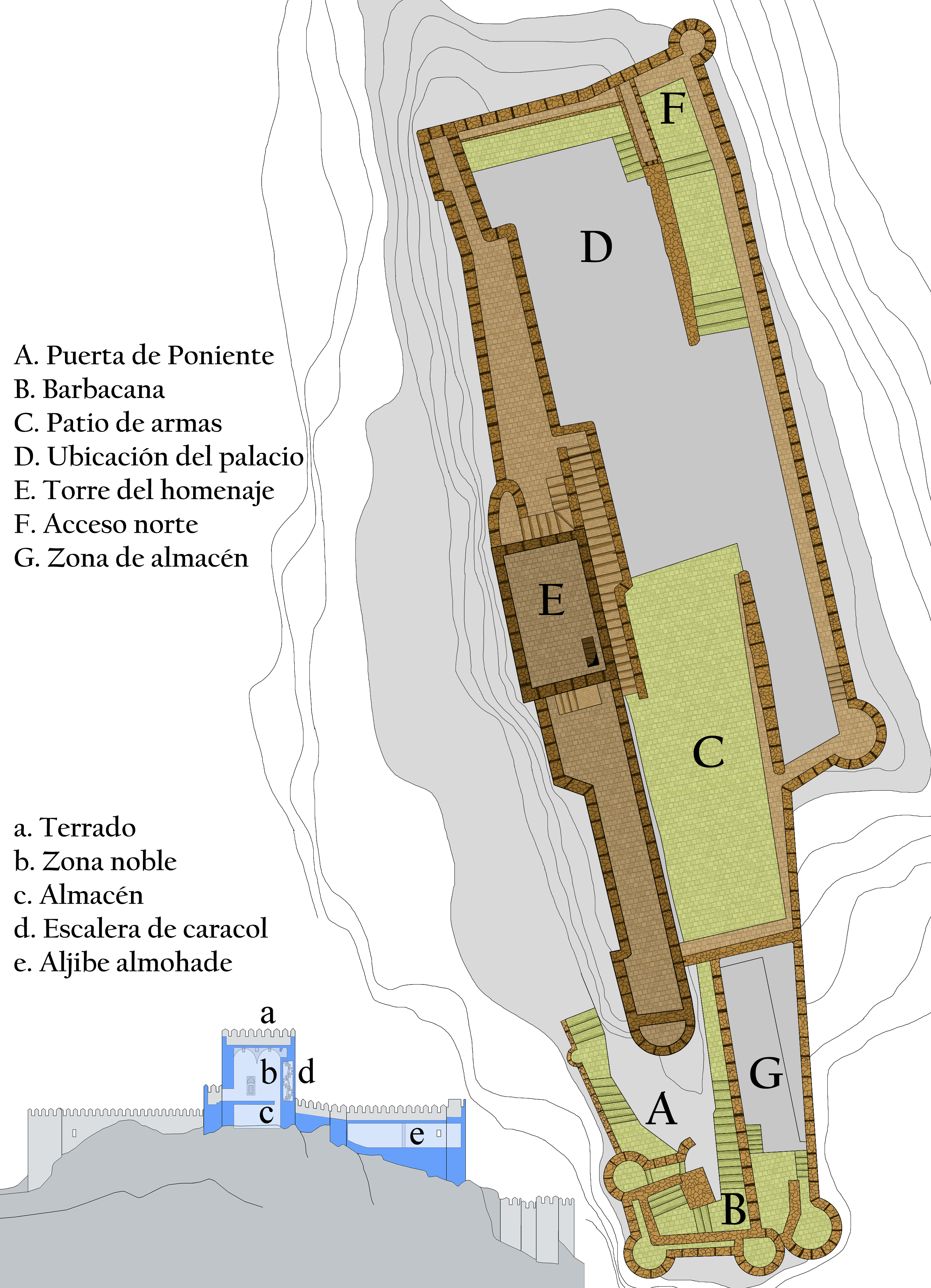
Layout of the Castle
