= Sanctuary of la Virgen de Gracia (Caudete) =

- Santuario de la Virgen de Gracia (Spanish)
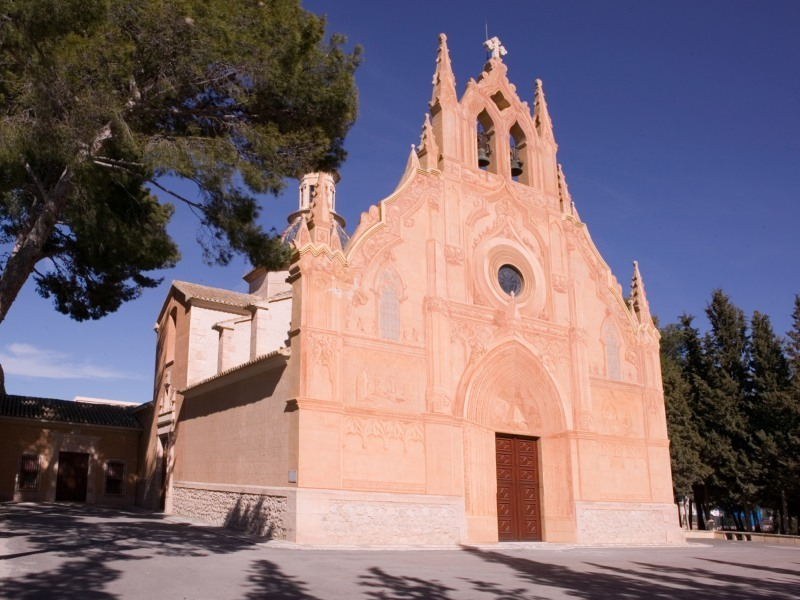

- Location within Spain
- 38.700064°N 0.972539°W
- Location: Caudete, Spain

Spanish Cultural Heritage
- Official name: Santuario de la Virgen de Gracia
- Type: Non-movable
- Criteria: Monument
- Designated: 1992
- Reference no.: RI-51-0007360

The Santuario de la Virgen de la Gracia is a Marian sanctuary located in Caudete, province of Albacete, community of Castile-La Mancha, Spain.

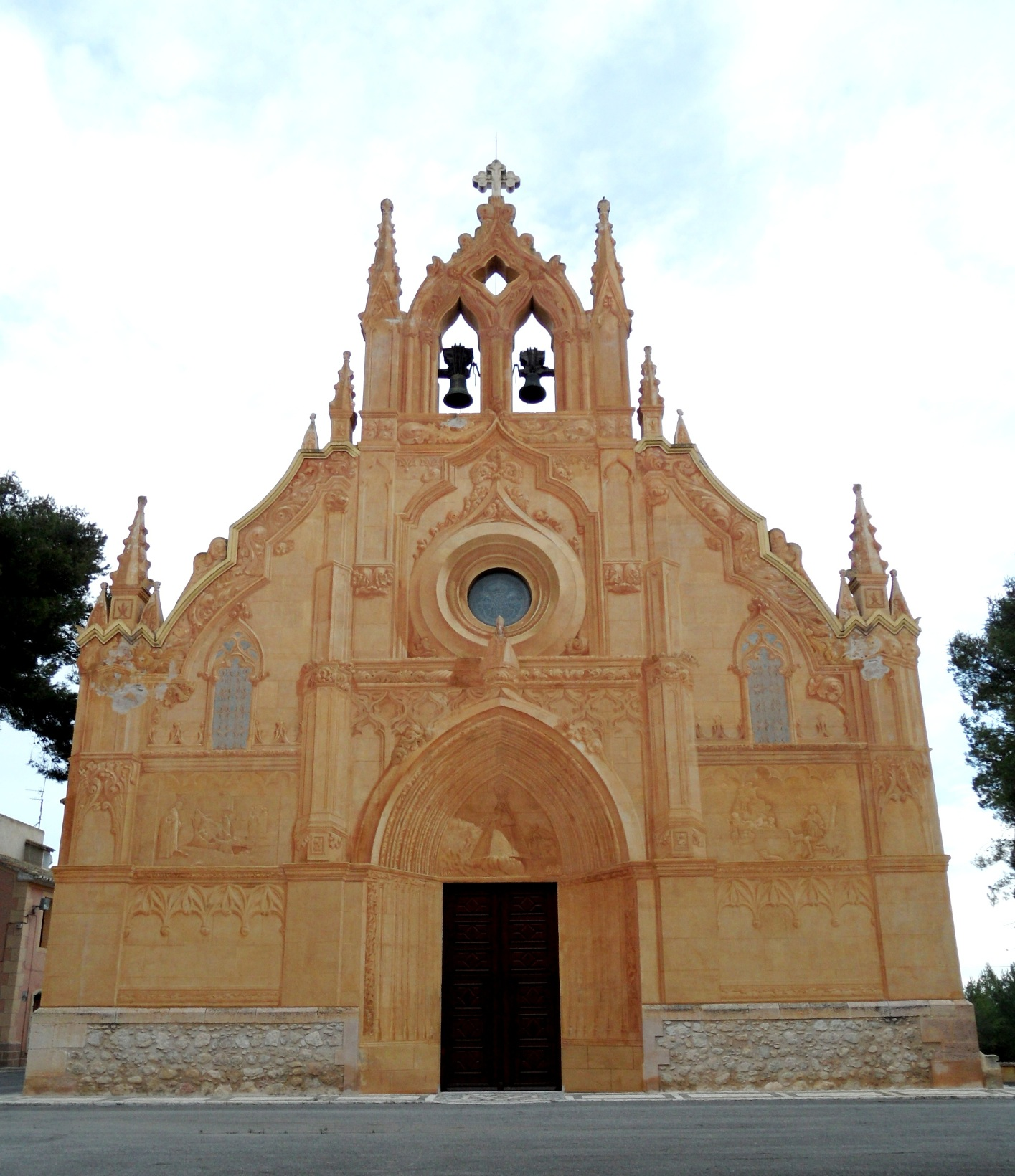
Facade of Sanctuary

The region was conquered by James I of Aragon in the 13th century, but in 1737 it was placed within the border of the Kingdom of Murcia, subsequently it was integrated in 1833 in the province of Albacete. The church arose around a miraculous wooden image of the Virgin. The original was burned in 1936, and a new sculpture sculpted in 1941.

Legend holds that St Benedict himself, foreseeing the future destruction of his Monastery of Montecassino, consigned the statue of the Virgin to an oratory at this site, which was near an ancient monastery. During the centuries of Muslim rule, the icon was hidden, only to be discovered underground by a shepherd named Juan Lopez in 1414. A confraternity venerating the icon developed, and from 1741 to 1758, the present church with an eclectic style was erected. Some of the elements recall rococo eccentricities, other Isabelline Gothic style. The church underwent restoration in the 20th century. It was declared Bien de Interés Cultural in 1992.
