= Sanctuary of Nuestra Señora de los Remedios =

- Santuario de Nuestra Señora de los Remedios (Spanish)
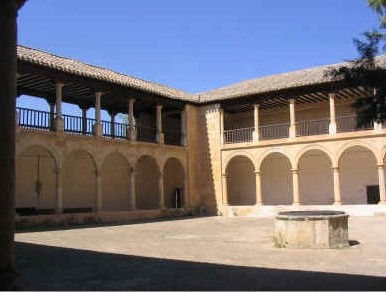

- Location within Spain
- 39.244917°N 2.068639°W
- Location: Fuensanta, Spain

Spanish Cultural Heritage
- Official name: Santuario de Nuestra Señora de los Remedios
- Type: Non-movable
- Criteria: Monument
- Designated: 1973
- Reference no.: RI-51-0003926

The Sanctuary of Nuestra Señora de los Remedios (Spanish: Santuario de Nuestra Señora de los Remedios) is a sanctuary located in Fuensanta, Spain. It was declared Bien de Interés Cultural in 1973.
