= Sanctuary of Santísimo Cristo de la Antigua y Virgen de la Encarnación =

- Santuario del Santísimo Cristo de la Antigua y Virgen de la Encarnación (Spanish)
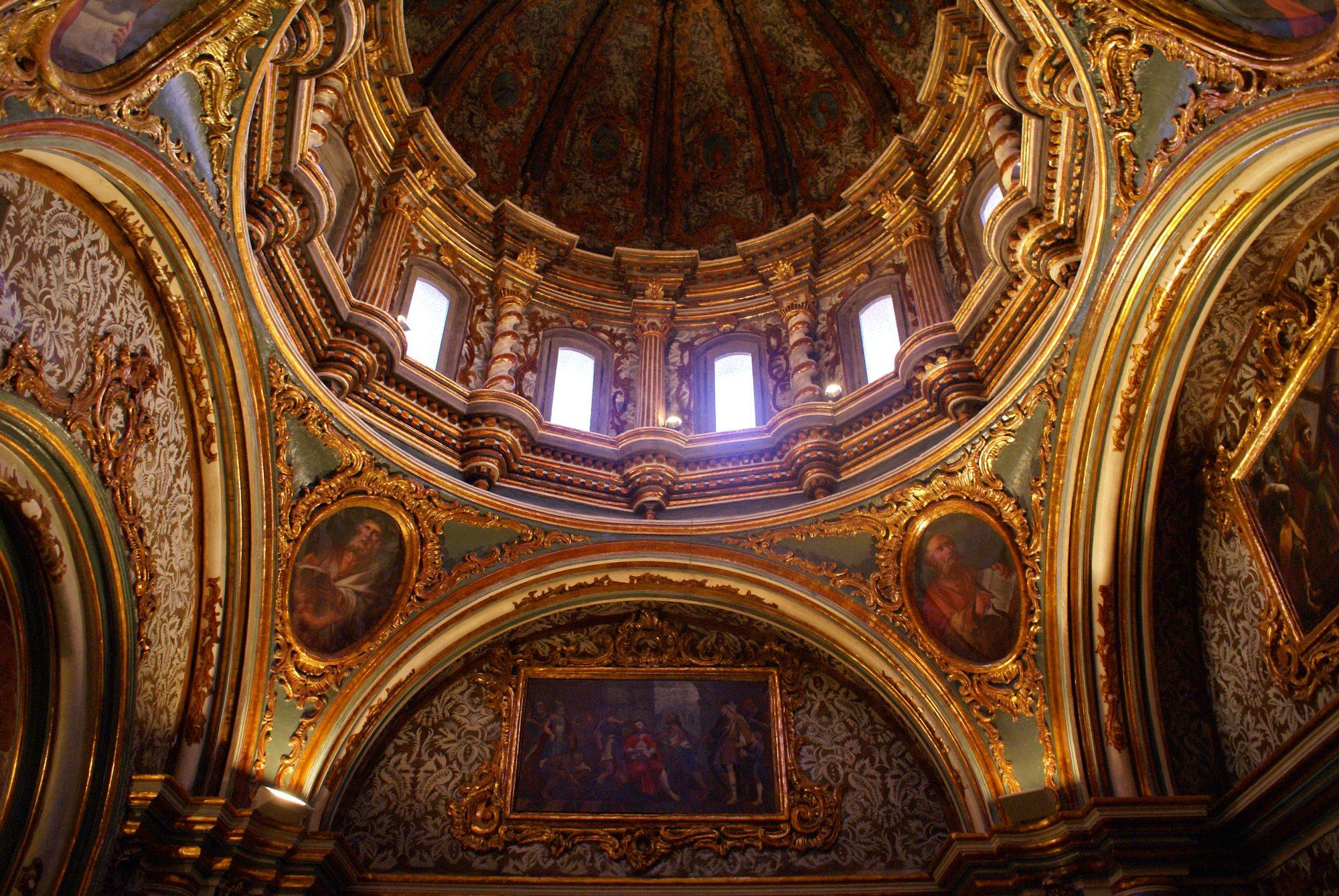

- Location within Spain
- 38.5877°N 1.6957°W
- Location: Tobarra, Spain

Spanish Cultural Heritage
- Official name: Santuario del Santísimo Cristo de la Antigua y Virgen de la Encarnación
- Type: Non-movable
- Criteria: Monument
- Designated: 1981
- Reference no.: RI-51-0004541

The Sanctuary of Santísimo Cristo de la Antigua y Virgen de la Encarnación (Spanish: Santuario del Santísimo Cristo de la Antigua y Virgen de la Encarnación) is a sanctuary located in Tobarra, Spain. It was declared Bien de Interés Cultural in 1981.
