= Council House of Villarrobledo =

- Casa consistorial de Villarrobledo (Spanish)
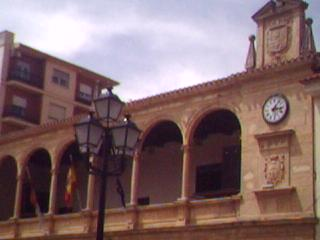

- Location within Spain
- 39.264166°N 2.604442°W
- Location: Villarrobledo, Spain

Spanish Cultural Heritage
- Official name: Casa consistorial de Villarrobledo
- Type: Non-movable
- Criteria: Monument
- Designated: 1991
- Reference no.: RI-51-0007116

The Council House of Villarrobledo (Spanish: Casa consistorial de Villarrobledo) is a council house located in Villarrobledo, Spain. It was declared Bien de Interés Cultural in 1991.
