= Joaquim Albareda =

Spanish historian

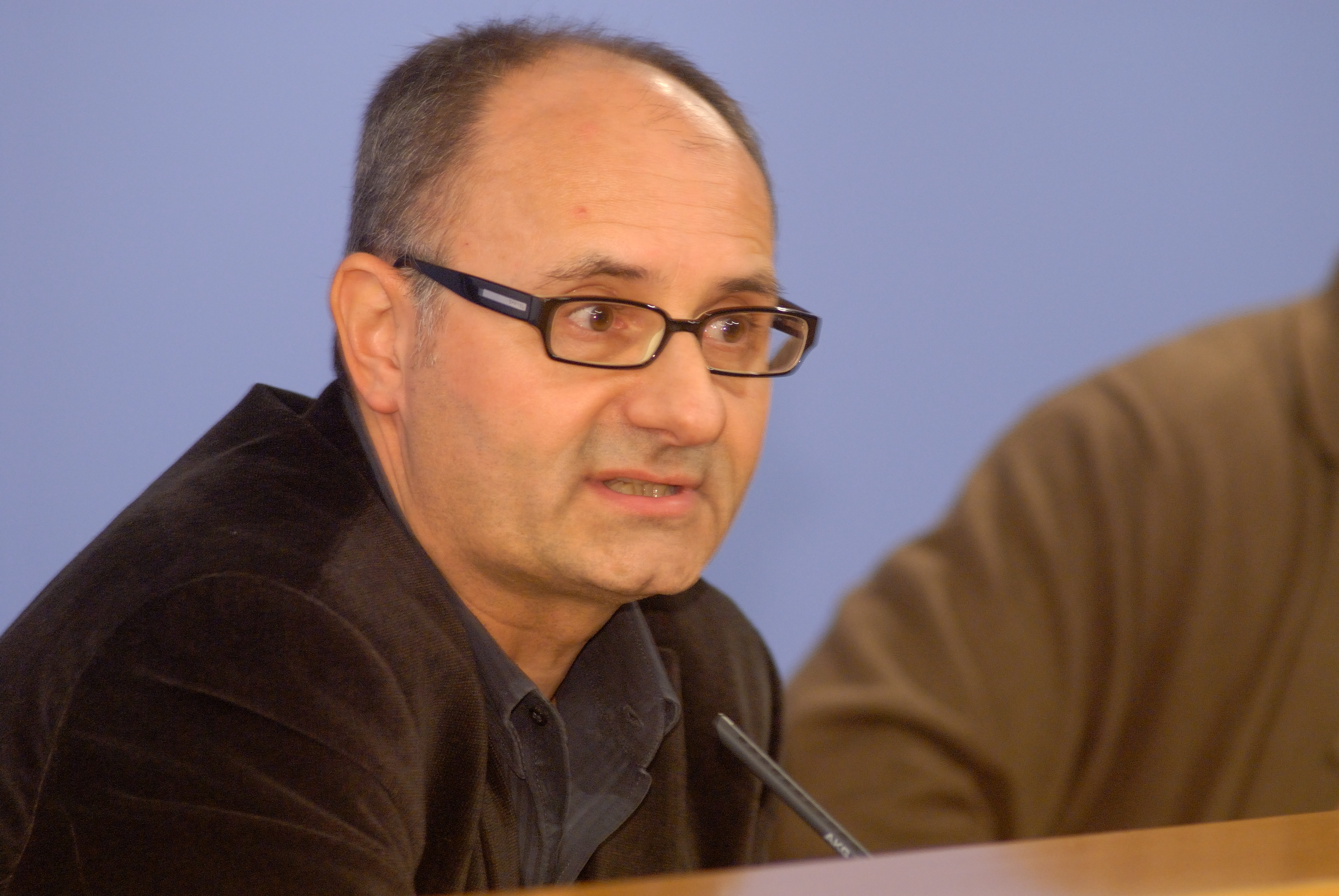
Joaquim Albareda

Joaquim Albareda Salvadó (Manlleu, 1957), is the chairing professor of modern history at Pompeu Fabra University (Barcelona) and former director of the Institut Universitari d'Història Jaume Vicens Vives at the same college. He is the head researcher of the research project España y los tratados de Utrecht (1712-1714), of the Spanish Ministry of Science and Innovation and Grup d’estudi de les institucions i de la societat a la Catalunya moderna (16th-19th Century). Director of the history collection publication Referències from Eumo Editorial. During recent years he has focused his research on the topic of the War of Spanish Succession (1705-1714) and the political history of the 18th century.

== Publications ==
=== Books ===
- Els catalans i Felip V. De la conspiració a la revolta (1700-1705) (Editorial Vicens Vives, 1993, IV Premi Internacional Jaume Vicens Vives de Ciències Socials).
- Política, religió i vida quotidiana en temps de guerra (1705-1714). El Dietari del convent de Santa Caterina i les Memòries d´Honorat de Pallejà (Eumo Editorial, 2001).
- Catalunya en un conflicte europeu. Felip V i la pèrdua de les llibertats catalanes (1700-1714) (Edicions 62, Generalitat de Catalunya, 2001).
- Felipe V y el triunfo del absolutismo. Cataluña en un conflicto europeo (1700-1714) (Generalitat de Catalunya, 2002).
- “Las Cortes de 1701-1702 y 1705-1706. La puesta al día del constitucionalismo”, Estudio introductorio/ “Les Corts de 1701-1702 i 1705-1706. La represa del constitucionalisme”, a Constitucions, Capítols i Actes de Cort. Anys 1701-1702 i 1705-1706. Edició facsímil (Editorial Base, 2004, pp. 5–64).
- 'El “cas dels catalans”. La conducta dels aliats arran de la guerra de Successió (1705-1742) (Fundació Noguera, 2005).
- “Pròleg: la Generalitat entre 1701 i 1714”, del volum X de Dietaris de la Generalitat, Anys 1701 a 1713. Juntament amb Eduard Martí. (Generalitat de Catalunya, 2007, pp. IX-XXXV).
- La Guerra de Sucesión de España (1700-1714) (Crítica, 2010, 2012).

Albareda is the author of Història de la Catalunya moderna (Pòrtic, 1999) alongside Pere Gifré. He has also directed "Desfeta política i embranzida econòmica. Segle XVIII", volum 5 de Història, política, societat i cultura dels Països Catalans (B. de Riquer dir., Enciclopèdia Catalana, 1995).

He is the author of the chapter “Societat i cultura en la Catalunya del Set-cents”, from Història de la cultura catalana. El set-cents, volum III, directed by Pere Gabriel, (Edicions 62, 1996, pp. 85–120) and the chapter “La vida política”, in the book Pierre Vilar i la història de Catalunya (Editorial Base, 2006, pp. 189–215).

Albareda has coordinated the collective work Del patriotisme al catalanisme. Societat i política (segles XVI-XIX) (Eumo Editorial, 2001) y Una relació difícil. Catalunya i l´Espanya moderna (Editorial Base, 2007) and, in collaboration of M. Janué i Miret, El nacimiento y la construcción del Estado moderno. Homenaje a Jaume Vicens Vives (Publicacions de la Universitat de València, 2011).

He has studied the politic works published between the end of the 17th century and the first half of the 18th in:

- Escrits polítics del segle XVIII. Tom I. Despertador de Catalunya i altres textos (Eumo Editorial, 1996).
- Escrits polítics del sgle XVIII . Tom V. Escrits del moment republicà de 1713-1714 (Eumo Editorial, 2011).

=== Articles ===
He has also written for international publications:

- “Il movimento filo-asburgico, il progetto di una Spagna alternativa (1705-1741)”, Cheiron, 39-40 (2003, pp. 79–104).
- “La Catalogne et Philippe V d´Espagne dans la guerre de Succession d´Espagne: des espérances de 1705 à la perte des libertés de 1714”, Revue d´Histoire Diplomatique (2007, pp. 231–247).
- “La Corona di Aragona durante la guerra di Successione alla corona spagnola (1705-1714)”, Annali di Storia Moderna e Contemporanea, 13 (2007, pp. 9–24).
- “Das Fortbestehen des Austrazismus in Wien nach dem Vertrag von Utrecht (1713-1727). Der Schatten des marqués de Rialp”, Hispania-Austria III. Der Spanische Erbfolgekrieg. F. Edelmayer, V. León Sanz, J.I. Ruiz Rodríguez (eds.), Institut für Geschichte der Universität Wien (2008, pp. 319–339).

Other works related to political history:

- “Vias de participación política del hombre común en Europa (siglos XVII-XVIII)”, a María Luz González Mezquita (Ed.), Temas y perspectvas teóricas de Historia Moderna (Universidad Nacional de Mar del Plata, 2011, pp. 55–76).
- "Cataluña en la España del siglo XVIII: represión, acomodación y disidencia”, J. Arrieta, J.Astigarraga (eds.), Conciliar la diversidad. Pasado y presente de la vertebración de España (Universidad del País Vasco, Fundació Ernest Lluch, 2009, pp. 55–75).
- “El debate sobre la modernidad del absolutismo borbónico”, Revista HmiC, nº X, 2012, http://webs2002.uab.cat/hmic (pp. 6–19).

=== Other publications ===
- 11 de setembre de 1714, amb A. Garcia Espuche (Generalitat de Catalunya, 2005).
- 1714. La guerra de Successió explicada per Joaquim Albareda i Joan Escúlies (Pòrtic, 2008).
- “La Diputació del General i els Comuns catalans: representació i modernitat política”, L´Avenç, 339. 2008, pp. 28–33.
