= Christmas card =

Major type of greeting cards

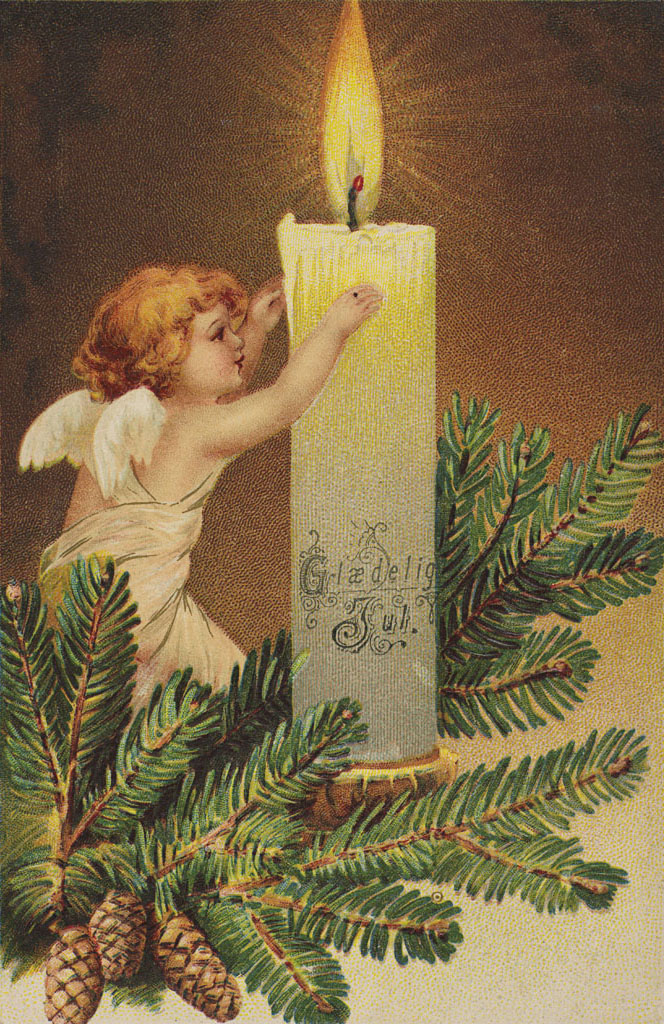
Norwegian Christmas card

A Christmas card is a greeting card sent as part of the traditional celebration of Christmas in order to convey between people a range of sentiments related to Christmastide and the festive holiday season. Christmas cards are usually exchanged during the weeks preceding Christmas Day by many people (including some non-Christians) in Western society and in Asia. The traditional greeting reads "wishing you a Merry Christmas and a Happy New Year". There are innumerable variations on this greeting, many cards expressing more religious sentiment, or containing a poem, prayer, Christmas song lyrics or Biblical verse; others focus on the general holiday season with an all-inclusive "Season's greetings". The first modern Christmas card was commissioned by Sir Henry Cole in 1843 and designed by John Calcott Horsley.

A Christmas card is generally commercially designed and purchased for the occasion. The content of the design might relate directly to the Christmas narrative with depictions of the Nativity of Jesus, or have Christian symbols such as the Star of Bethlehem or a white dove representing both the Holy Spirit and Peace. Many Christmas cards show Christmas traditions, such as seasonal figures (e.g., Santa Claus, snowmen, and reindeer), objects associated with Christmas such as candles, holly, baubles, and Christmas trees, and Christmastime activities such as shopping, caroling, and partying, or other aspects of the season such as the snow and wildlife of the northern winter. Some secular cards depict nostalgic scenes of the past such as crinolined shoppers in 19th-century streetscapes; others are humorous, particularly in depicting the antics of Santa and his elves.

== History ==
The first known Christmas card was sent by Michael Maier to James I of England and his son Henry Frederick, Prince of Wales in 1611. It was discovered in 1979 by Adam McLean in the Scottish Record Office. It was hand-made and incorporated Rosicrucian imagery, with the words of the greeting – "A greeting on the birthday of the Sacred King, to the most worshipful and energetic lord and most eminent James, King of Great Britain and Ireland, and Defender of the true faith, with a gesture of joyful celebration of the Birthday of the Lord, in most joyand fortune, we enter into the new auspicious year 1612" – being laid out to form a rose.

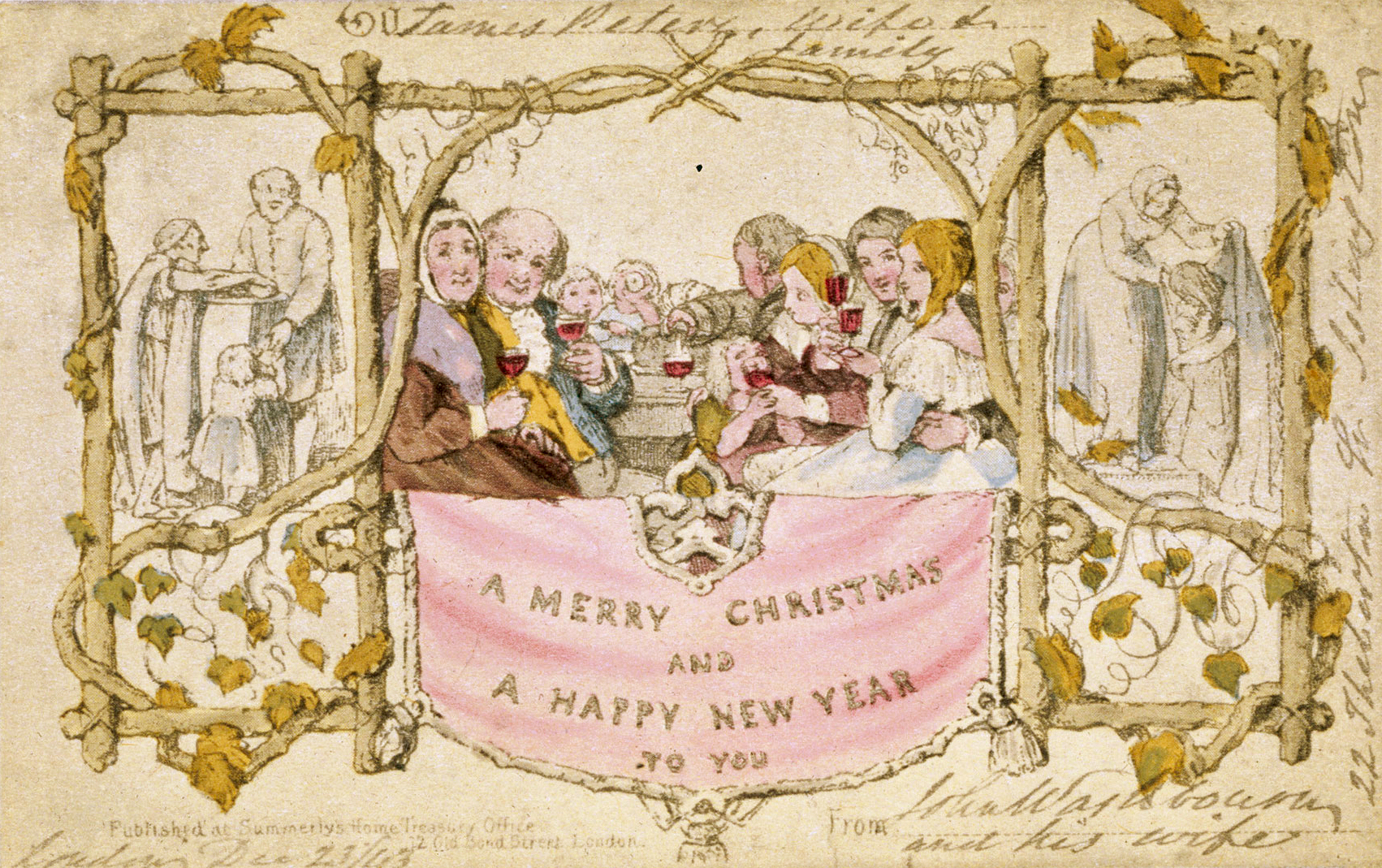
The world's first commercially produced Christmas card, designed by John Callcott Horsley having been conceived by Sir Henry Cole in 1843

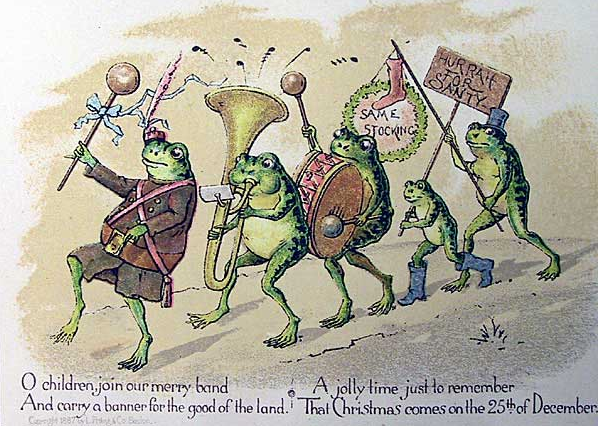
Christmas card by Louis Prang, showing a group of anthropomorphized frogs parading with banner and band

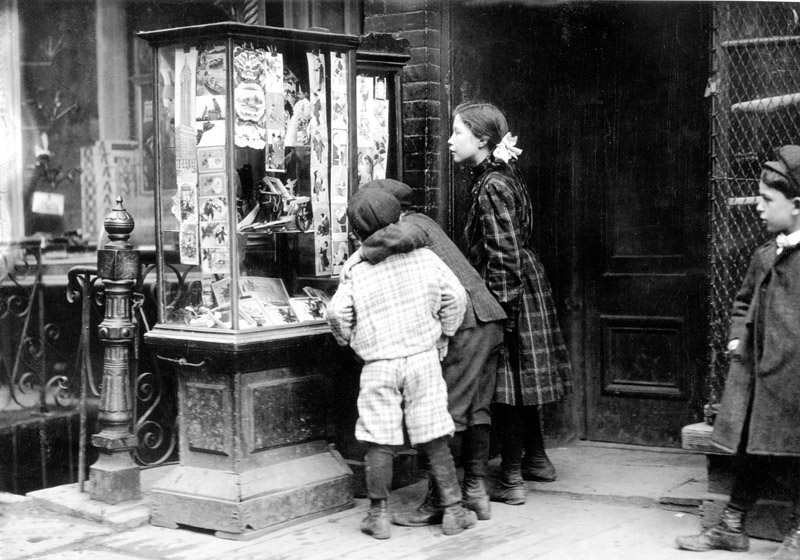
Children looking at Christmas cards in New York 1910

The first commercially produced card was commissioned by Sir Henry Cole and designed by John Callcott Horsley in London 1843. The central picture showed three generations of a family raising a toast to the card's recipient, with the message: A Merry Christmas and A Happy New Year; on either side were scenes of charity, with food and clothing being given to the poor. Allegedly the image of the family drinking wine together proved controversial, but the idea was shrewd: Cole had helped introduce the Penny Post three years earlier. Two batches totaling 2,050 cards were printed and sold that year for a shilling each.

Early British cards rarely showed winter or religious themes, instead favoring flowers, fairies and other fanciful designs that reminded the recipient of the approach of spring. Humorous and sentimental images of children and animals were popular, as were increasingly elaborate shapes, decorations and materials. At Christmas 1873, the lithograph firm Prang and Mayer began creating greeting cards for the popular market in Britain. The firm began selling the Christmas card in America in 1874, thus becoming the first printer to offer cards in America. Its owner, Louis Prang, is sometimes called the "father of the American Christmas card." By the 1880s, Prang was producing over five million cards a year by using the chromolithography process of printmaking. However, the popularity of his cards led to cheap imitations that eventually drove him from the market. The advent of the postcard spelled the end for elaborate Victorian-style cards, but by the 1920s, cards with envelopes had returned. The extensive Laura Seddon Greeting Card Collection from the Manchester Metropolitan University gathers 32,000 Victorian and Edwardian greeting cards, printed by the major publishers of the day, including Britain's first commercially produced Christmas card.

The production of Christmas cards was, throughout the 20th century, a profitable business for many stationery manufacturers, with the design of cards continually evolving with changing tastes and printing techniques. The now widely recognized brand Hallmark Cards was established in 1913 by Joyce Hall with the help of brother Rollie Hall to market their self-produced Christmas cards. The Hall brothers capitalized on a growing desire for more personalized greeting cards, and reached critical success when the outbreak of World War I increased demand for cards to send to soldiers. The World Wars brought cards with patriotic themes. Idiosyncratic "studio cards" with cartoon illustrations and sometimes risque humor caught on in the 1950s. Nostalgic, sentimental, and religious images have continued in popularity, and, in the 21st century, reproductions of Victorian and Edwardian cards are easy to obtain. Modern Christmas cards can be bought individually but are also sold in packs of the same or varied designs. In recent decades changes in technology may be responsible for the decline of the Christmas card. The estimated number of cards received by American households dropped from 29 in 1987 to 20 in 2004. Email and telephones allow for more frequent contact and are easier for generations raised without handwritten letters – especially given the availability of websites offering free email Christmas cards. Despite the decline, 1.9 billion cards were sent in the U.S. in 2005 alone. Some card manufacturers now provide E-cards. In the UK, Christmas cards account for almost half of the volume of greeting card sales, with over 668.9 million Christmas cards sold in the 2008 festive period. In mostly non-religious countries (e.g. Czech Republic), the cards are called New Year Cards; they are sent before Christmas and the emphasis (design, texts) is mostly given to the New Year, omitting religious symbols.

=== Official Christmas cards ===
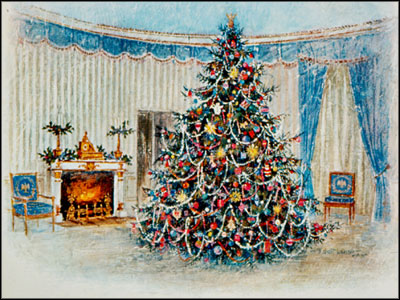
President Johnson's 1967 White House Christmas card

"Official" Christmas cards began with Queen Victoria in the 1840s. The British royal family's cards are generally portraits reflecting significant personal events of the year.

There is a long-standing custom for the American President and First Lady to send White House Christmas Cards each holiday season. The practice originated with President Calvin Coolidge, who was the first president to issue a written statement of peaceful tidings during the holidays in 1927. President Herbert Hoover was the first to give Christmas notes to the White House staff, and President Franklin Delano Roosevelt was the first president to utilize the card format (rather than the previously used notes or a written statement) that most closely resembles the Christmas cards of today.

In 1953, U.S. President Dwight D. Eisenhower issued the first official White House Card. The cards usually depict White House scenes as rendered by prominent American artists. The number of recipients has snowballed over the decades, from just 2,000 in 1961 to 1.4 million in 2005.

=== Commercial Christmas cards ===
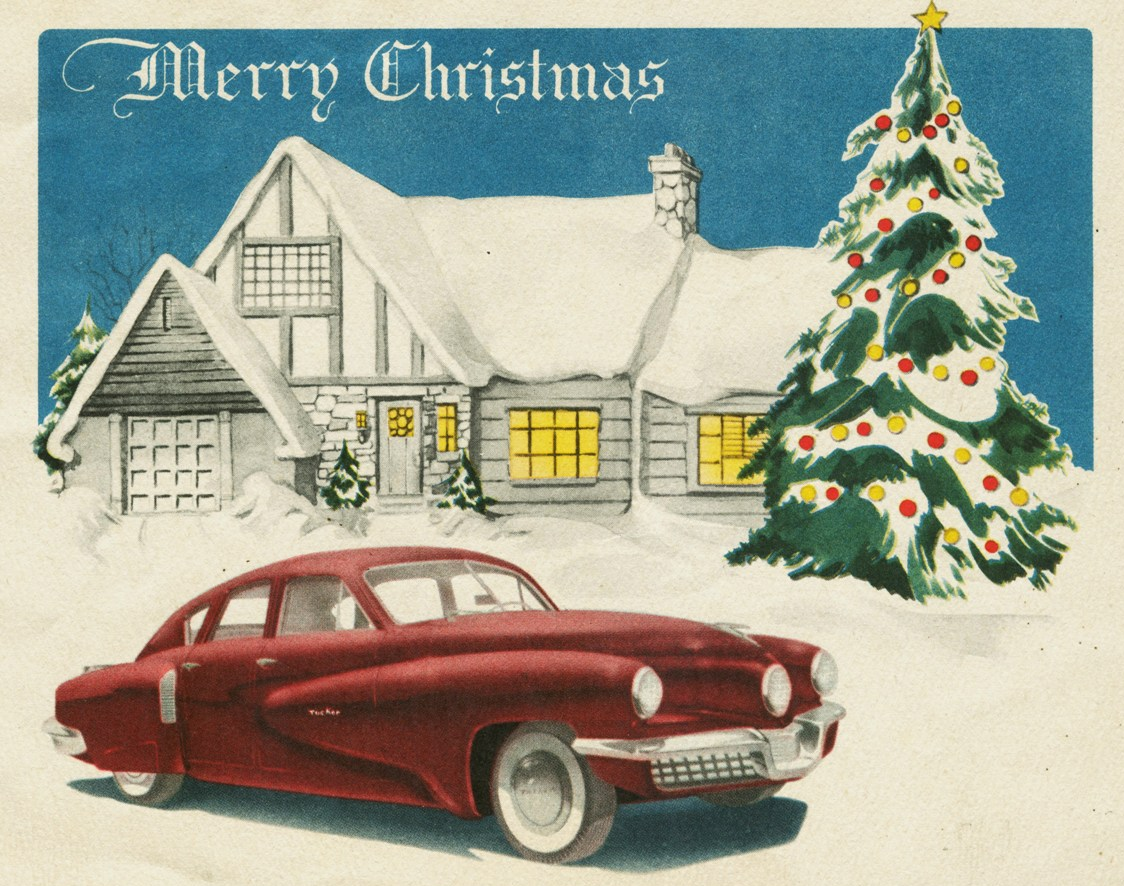
Tucker Corporation Christmas Card, 1947

Many businesses, from small local businesses to multi-national enterprises, send Christmas cards to the people on their customer lists, as a way to develop general goodwill, retain brand awareness and reinforce social networks. These cards are almost always discrete and secular in design, and do not attempt to sell a product, limiting themselves to mentioning the name of the business. The practice harkens back to trade cards of the 18th century, an ancestor of the modern Christmas card.

In September 1964, it was reported that, during the previous eight years, British industry had increasingly stopped sending "official" Christmas cards, including Granada, ICI, Schweppes, Shell and Unilver.

=== Charity Christmas cards ===
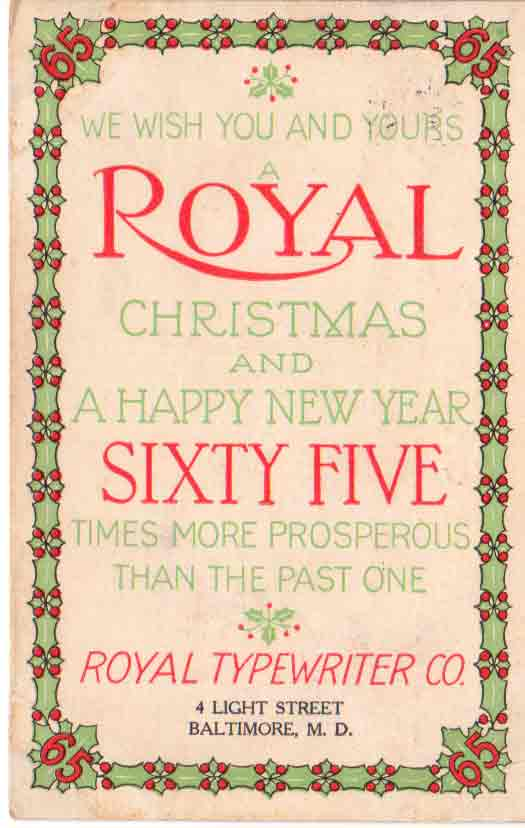
Christmas card promoting Royal typewriters

Many organizations produce special Christmas cards as a fundraising tool. The most famous of these enterprises is probably the UNICEF Christmas card program, launched in 1949, which selects artwork from internationally known artists for card reproduction. The UK-based Charities Advisory Trust used to give out an annual "Scrooge Award" to the cards that return the smallest percentage to the charities they claim to support although it is not universally well received by the Christmas card producers. The RSPB produced the first ever charity Christmas card in 1898, selling 4,500 that year

=== Christmas stamps and stickers ===
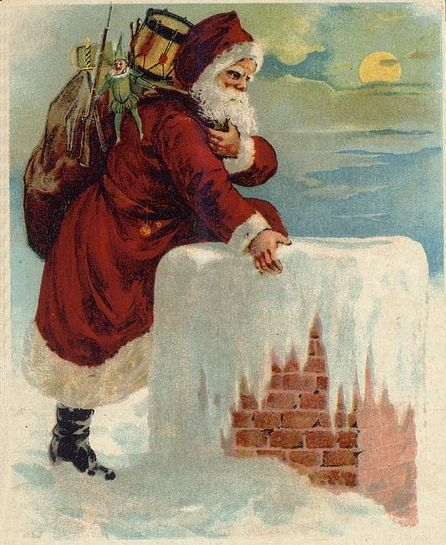
Santa Coming Down the Chimney

Many countries produce official Christmas stamps, which may be brightly coloured and depict some aspect of Christmas tradition or a Nativity scene. Small decorative stickers are also made to seal the back of envelopes, typically showing a trinket or some symbol of Christmas.

In 2004, the German post office gave away 20 million free scented stickers, to make Christmas cards smell of a fir Christmas tree, cinnamon, gingerbread, a honey-wax candle, a baked apple and an orange.

=== Collectors items ===
From the beginning, Christmas cards have been avidly collected. Queen Mary amassed a large collection that is now housed in the British Museum. The University College London's Slade School of Fine Art houses a collection of handmade Christmas Cards from alumni such as Paula Rego and Richard Hamilton and are displayed at events over the Christmas season, when members of the public can make their own Christmas cards in the Strang Print Room. Specimens from the "golden age" of printing (1840s–1890s) are especially prized and bring in large sums at auctions. In December 2005, one of Horsley's original cards sold for nearly £9,000. Collectors may focus on particular images like Santa Claus, poets, or printing techniques. The Christmas card that holds the world record as the most expensive ever sold was a card produced in 1843 by J. C. Horsley and commissioned by civil servant Sir Henry Cole. The card, one of the world's first, was sold in 2001 by UK auctioneers Henry Aldridge to an anonymous bidder for a record breaking £22,250.

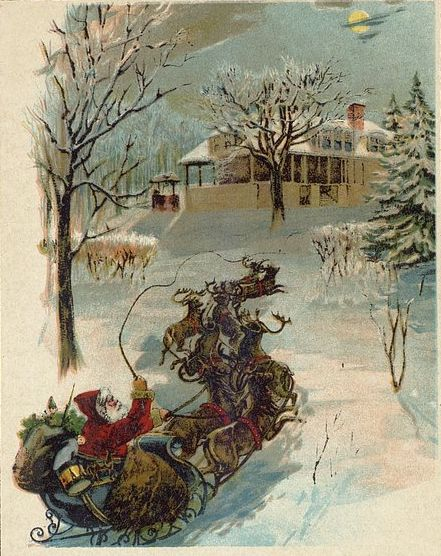
Santa Claus and his reindeer

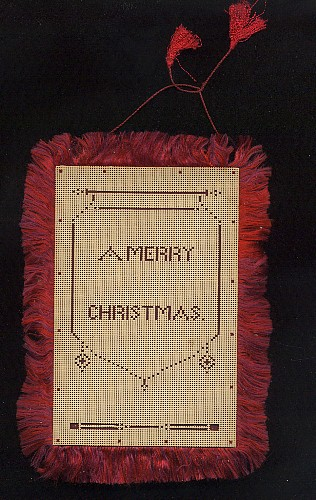
Silk cord and tassels, c. 1860

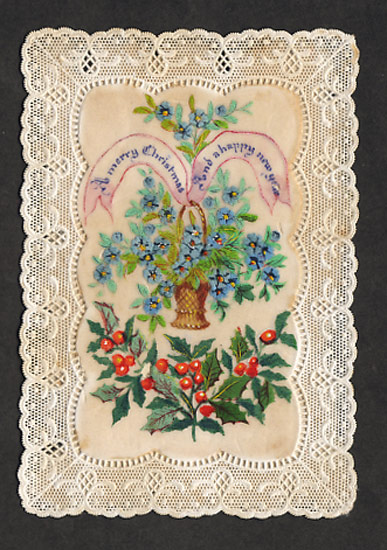
Victorian, c. 1870

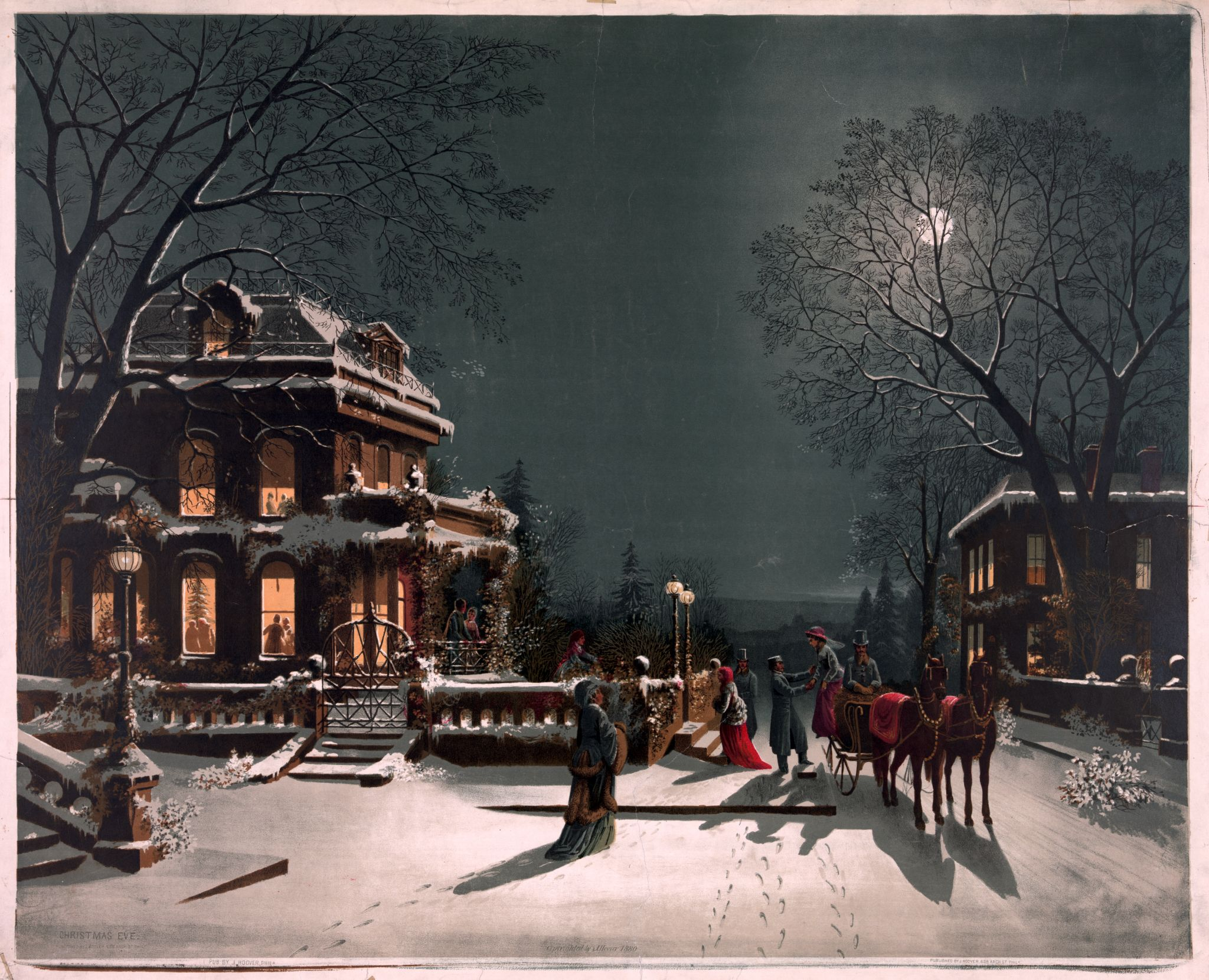
Christmas Card, 1880

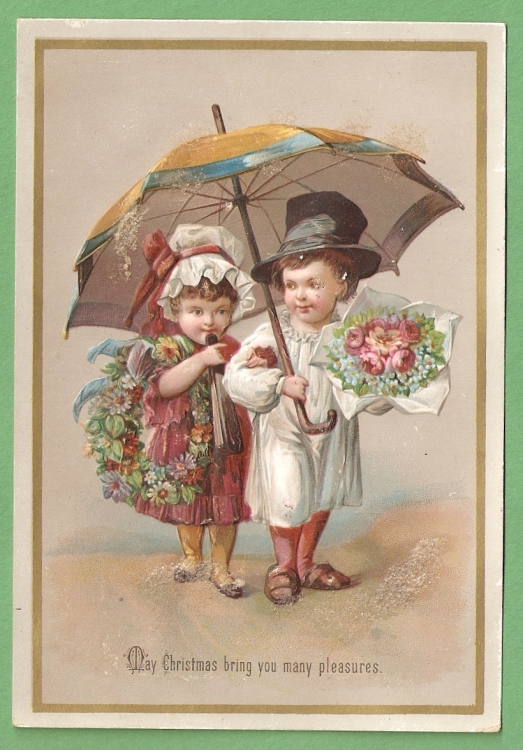
Victorian, 1885

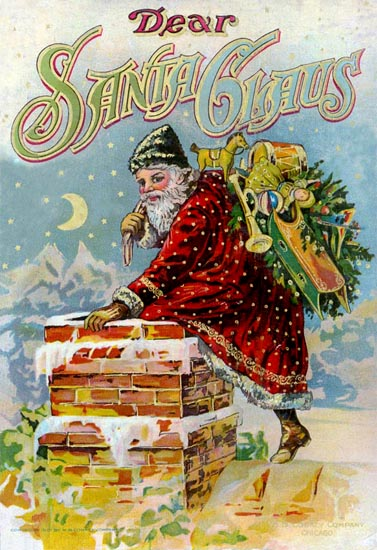
Postcard, c. 1901

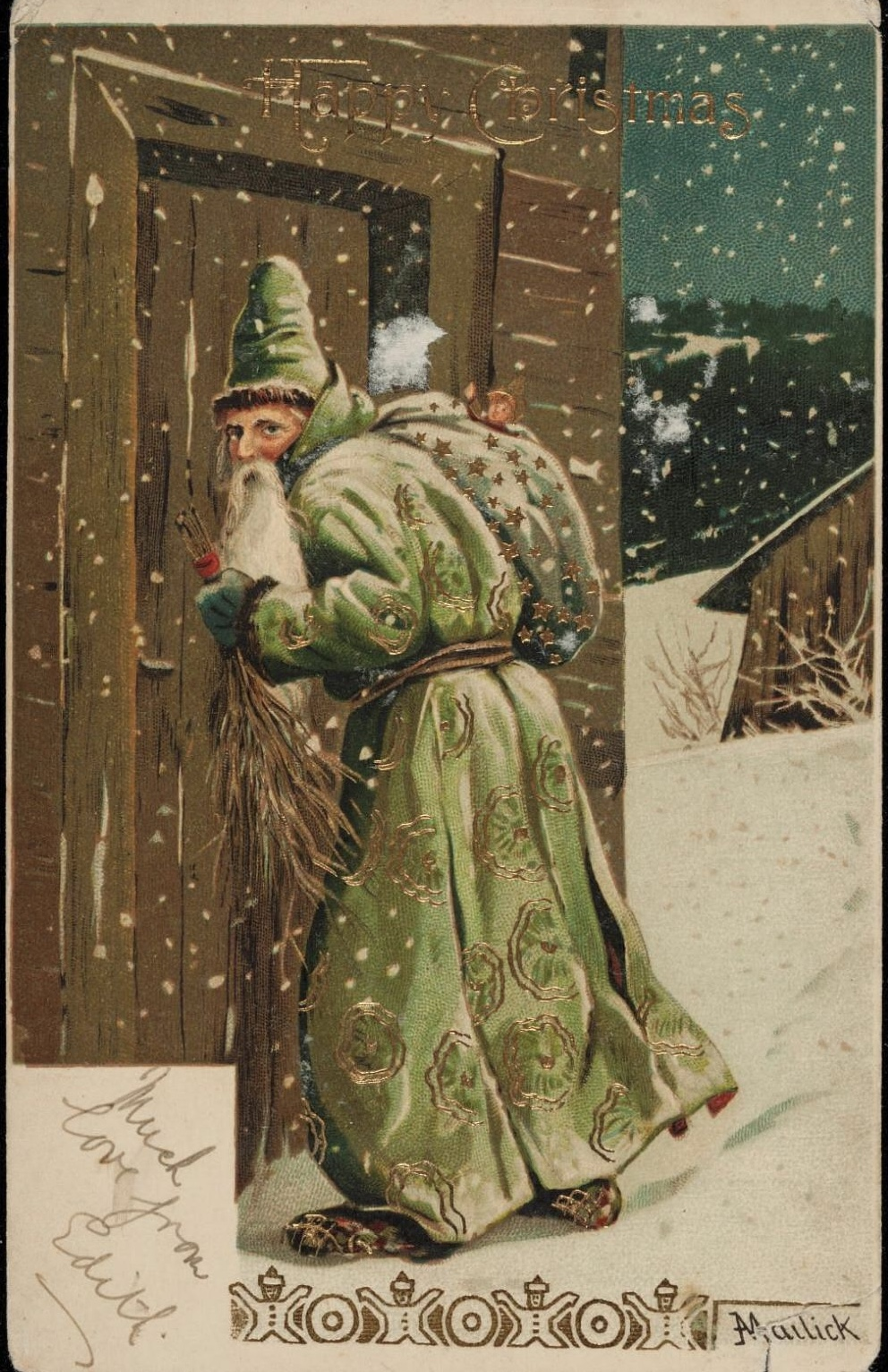
Mailick Christmas card, 1904

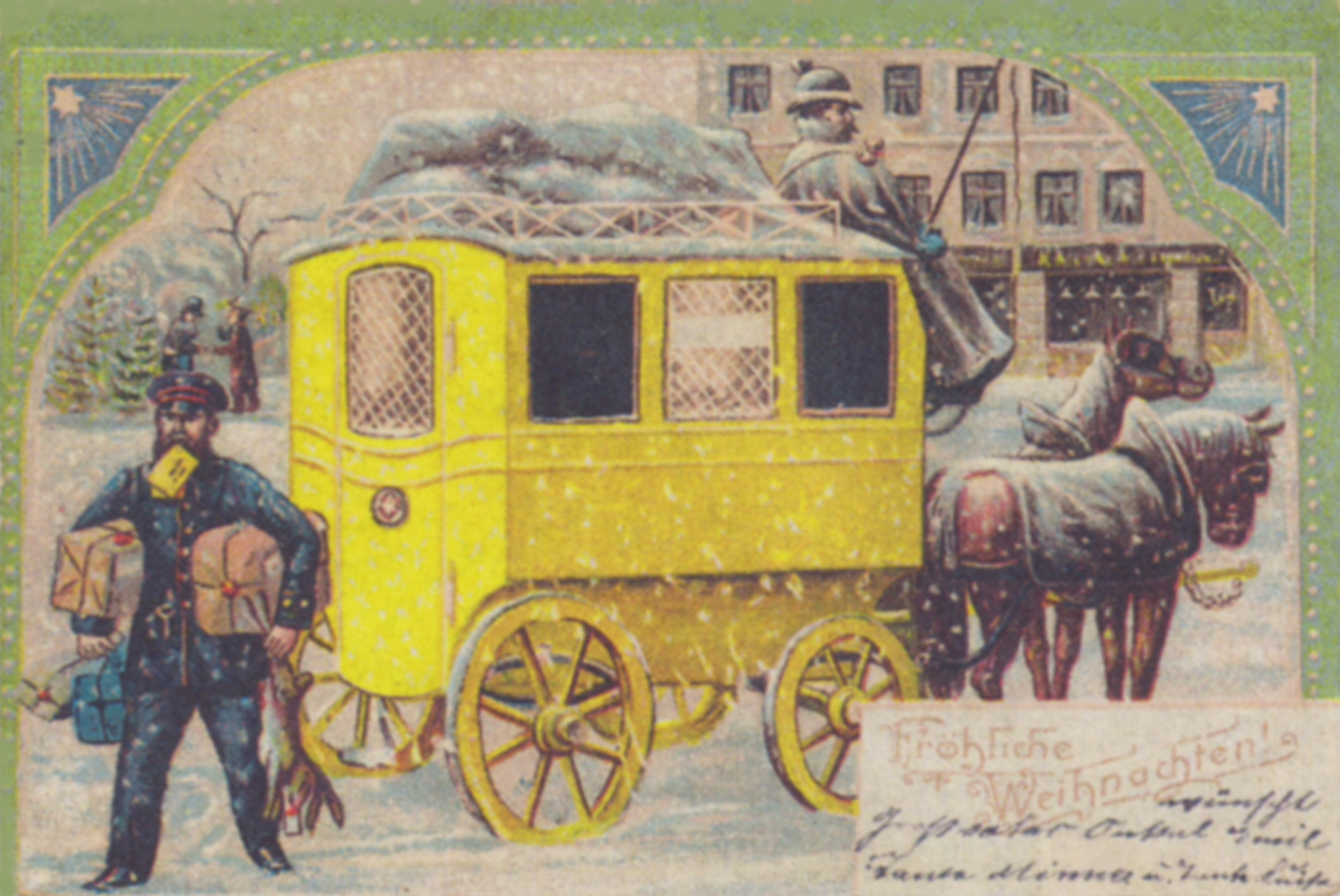
Christmas card, 1904

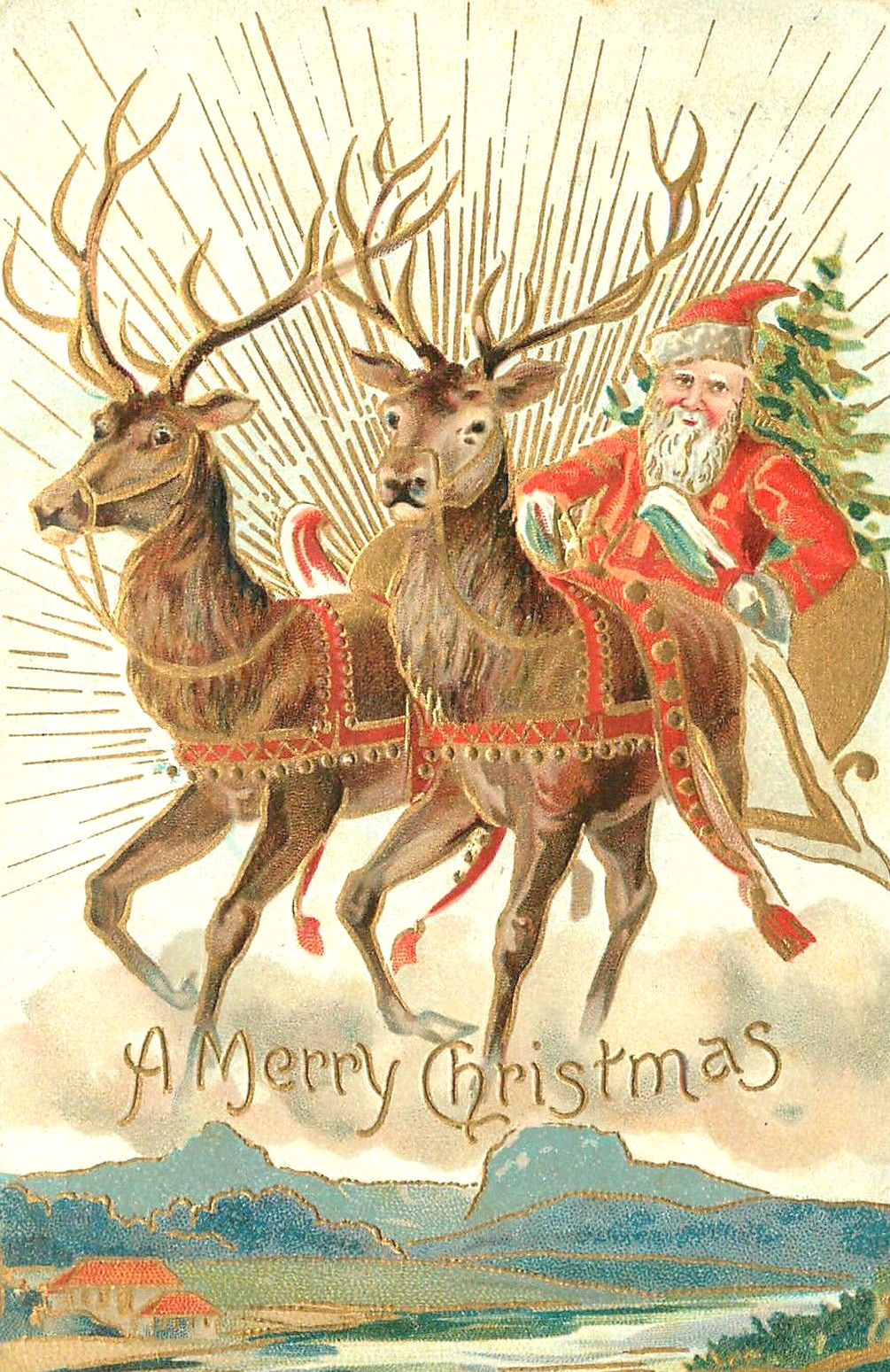
Christmas postcard 1907

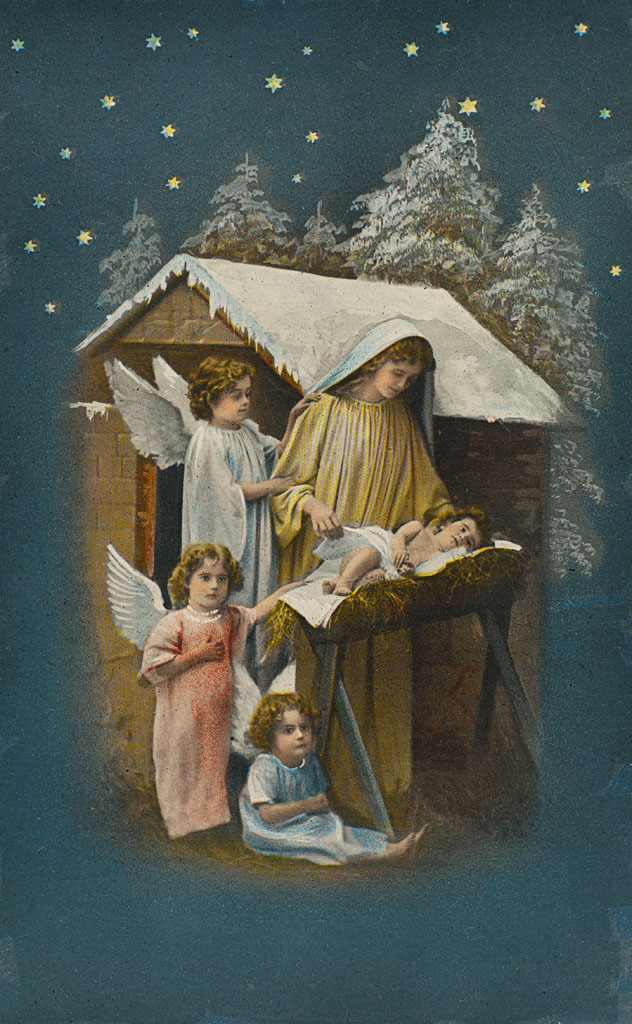
Christmas card, 1912

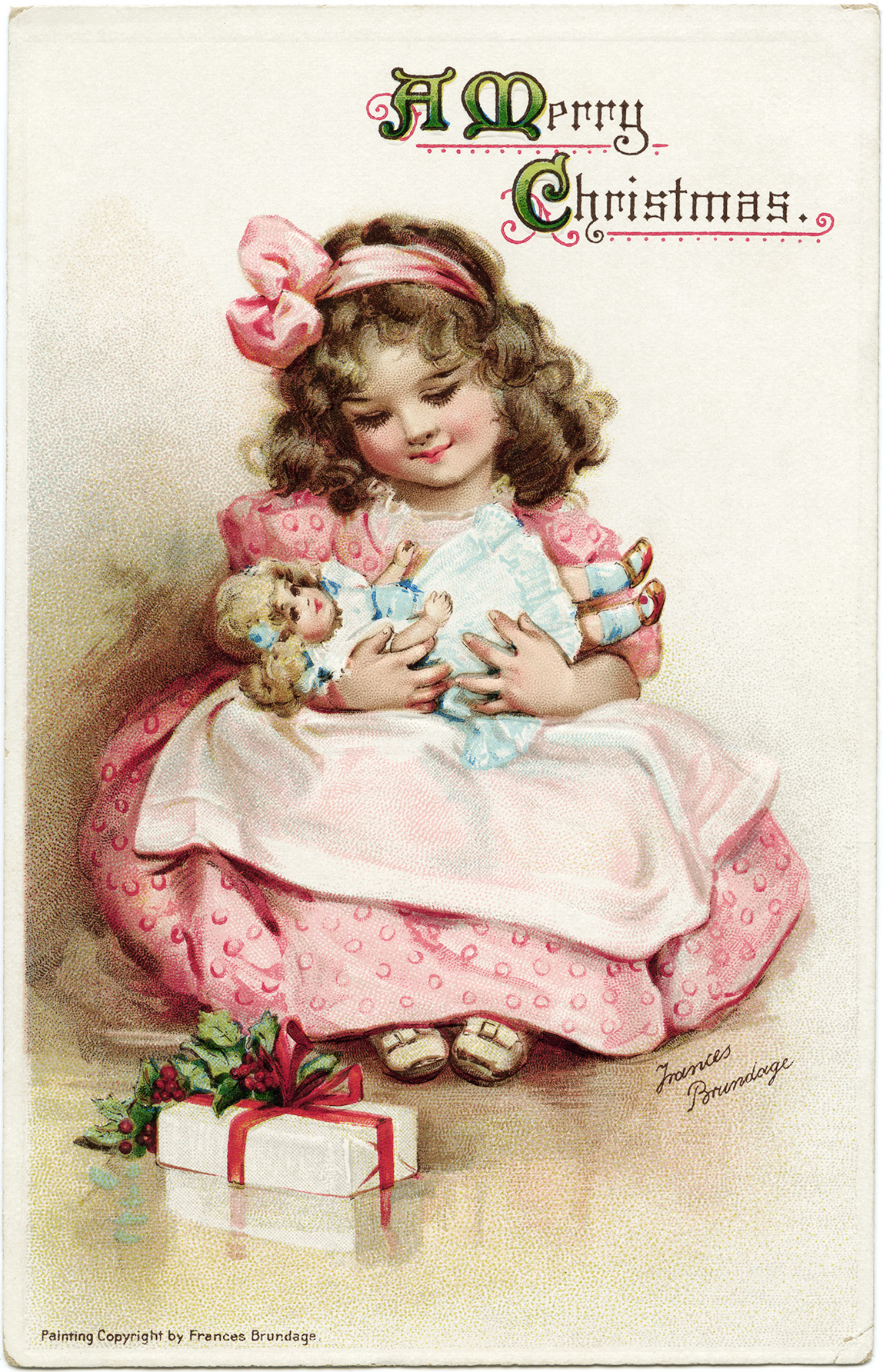
Frances Brundage Christmas card, 1910

=== Home-made cards ===
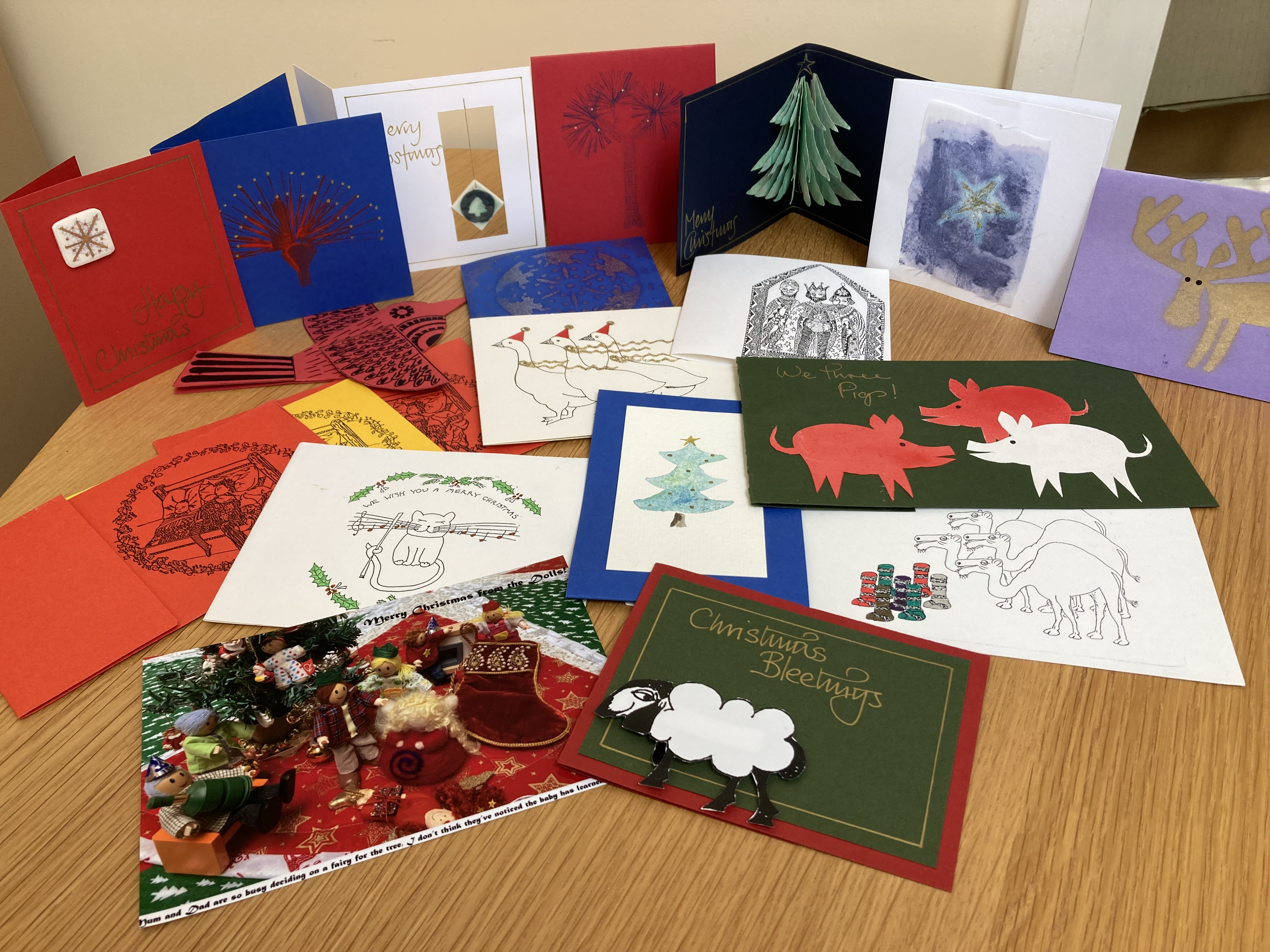
Home-made Christmas Cards can take many forms

Since the 19th century, many families and individuals have chosen to make their own Christmas cards, either in response to monetary necessity, as an artistic endeavour, or in order to avoid the commercialism associated with Christmas cards. With a higher preference of handmade gifts during the 19th century over purchased or commercial items, homemade cards carried high sentimental value as gifts alone. Many families make the creation of Christmas cards a family endeavour and part of the seasonal festivity, along with stirring the Christmas cake and decorating the tree. Over the years such cards have been produced in every type of paint and crayon, in collage and in simple printing techniques such as potato-cuts. A revival of interest in paper crafts, particularly scrapbooking, has raised the status of the homemade card and made available an array of tools for stamping, punching, and cutting.

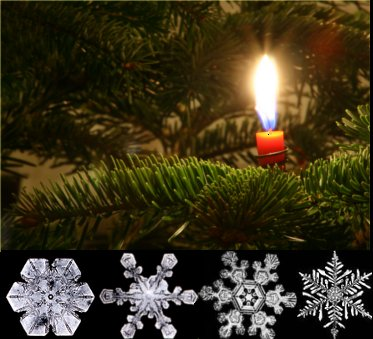
Christmas card made on a PC incorporating digital photography

Advances in digital photography and printing have provided the technology for many people to design and print their own cards, using their original graphic designs or photos, or those available with many computer programs or online as clip art, as well as a great range of typefaces. Such homemade cards include personal touches such as family photos and holidays snapshots. Crowdsourcing, another trend enabled by the Internet, has allowed thousands of independent and hobbyist graphic designers to produce and distribute holiday cards around the world.

== The Christmas card list ==
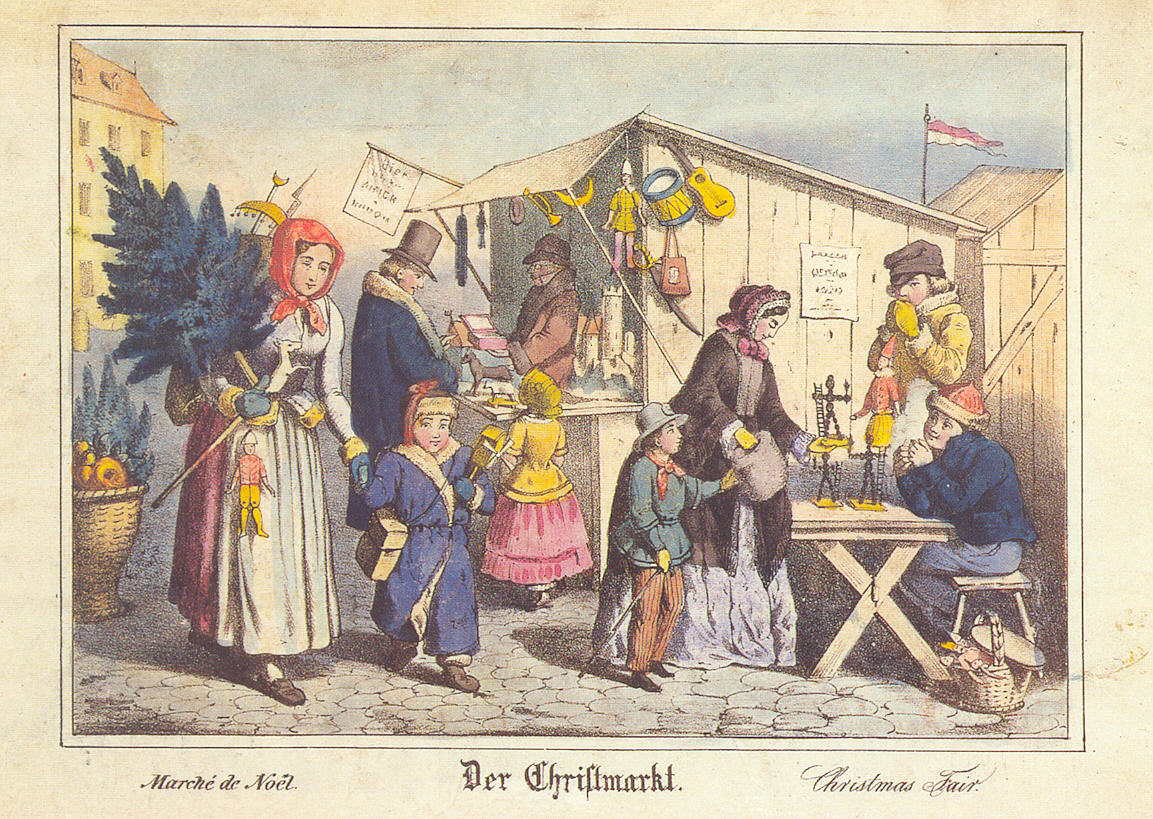
Christmas Market in Nürnberg, lithography from the 19th century

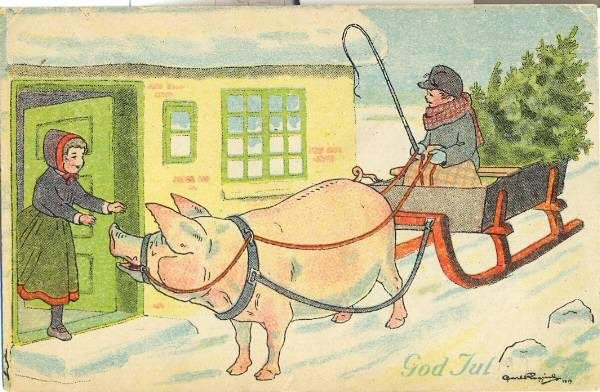
Danish Christmas card, 1919

Many people send cards to both close friends and distant acquaintances, potentially making the sending of cards a multi-hour chore in addressing dozens or even hundreds of envelopes. The greeting in the card can be personalized but brief, or may include a summary of the year's news. The extreme of this is the Christmas letter (below). Because cards are usually exchanged year after year, the phrase "to be off someone's Christmas card list" is used to indicate a falling out between friends or public figures.

=== Christmas letters ===
Some people take the annual mass-mailing of cards as an opportunity to update those they know with the year's events, and include the so-called "Christmas letter" reporting on the family's doings, sometimes running to multiple printed pages. In the UK these are known as round-robin letters. While a practical notion, Christmas letters meet with a mixed reception; recipients may take it as boring minutiae, bragging, or a combination of the two, whereas other people appreciate Christmas letters as more personal than mass-produced cards with a generic missive and an opportunity to "catch up" with the lives of family and friends who are rarely seen or communicated with. Since the letter will be received by both close and distant relatives, there is also the potential for the family members to object to how they are presented to others; an entire episode of Everybody Loves Raymond was built around conflict over the content of just such a letter.

== Environmental impact and recycling ==
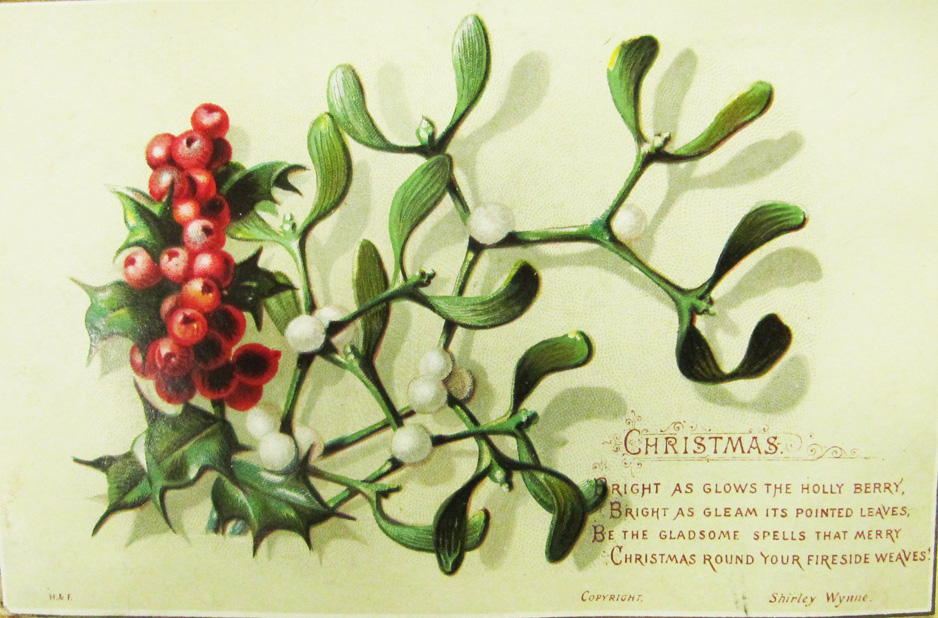
Christmas card with holly

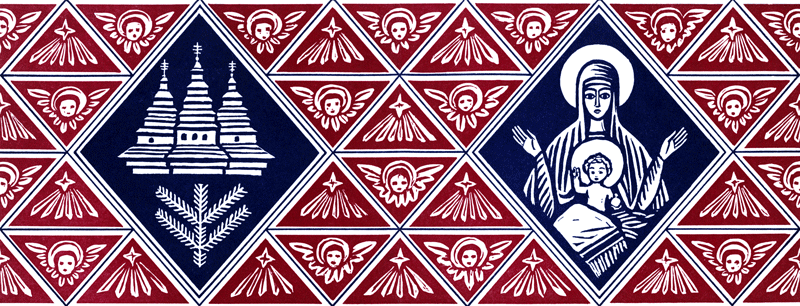
Jacques Hnizdovsky Christmas card

During the first 70 years of the 19th century it was common for Christmas and other greeting cards to be recycled by women's service organizations who collected them and removed the pictures, to be pasted into scrap books for the entertainment of children in hospitals, orphanages, kindergartens and missions. With children's picture books becoming cheaper and more readily available, this form of scrap-booking has almost disappeared.

Recent concern over the environmental impact of printing, mailing and delivering cards has fueled an increase in e-cards.

The U.K. conservation charity Woodland Trust runs an annual campaign to collect and recycle Christmas cards to raise awareness of recycling and collect donations from corporate sponsors and supporters. All recycled cards help raise money to plant more trees. In the 12 years that the Woodland Trust Christmas Card Recycling Scheme has been running, more than 600 million cards have been recycled. This has enabled the Woodland Trust to plant more than 141,000 trees, save over 12,000 tonnes of paper from landfill and stop over 16,000 tonnes of CO^{2} from going into the atmosphere – the equivalent to taking more than 5,000 cars off the road for a year. The scheme has had celebrity supporters including Jo Brand, Dermot O' Leary and Sean Bean and is the longest running scheme of its type in the country.

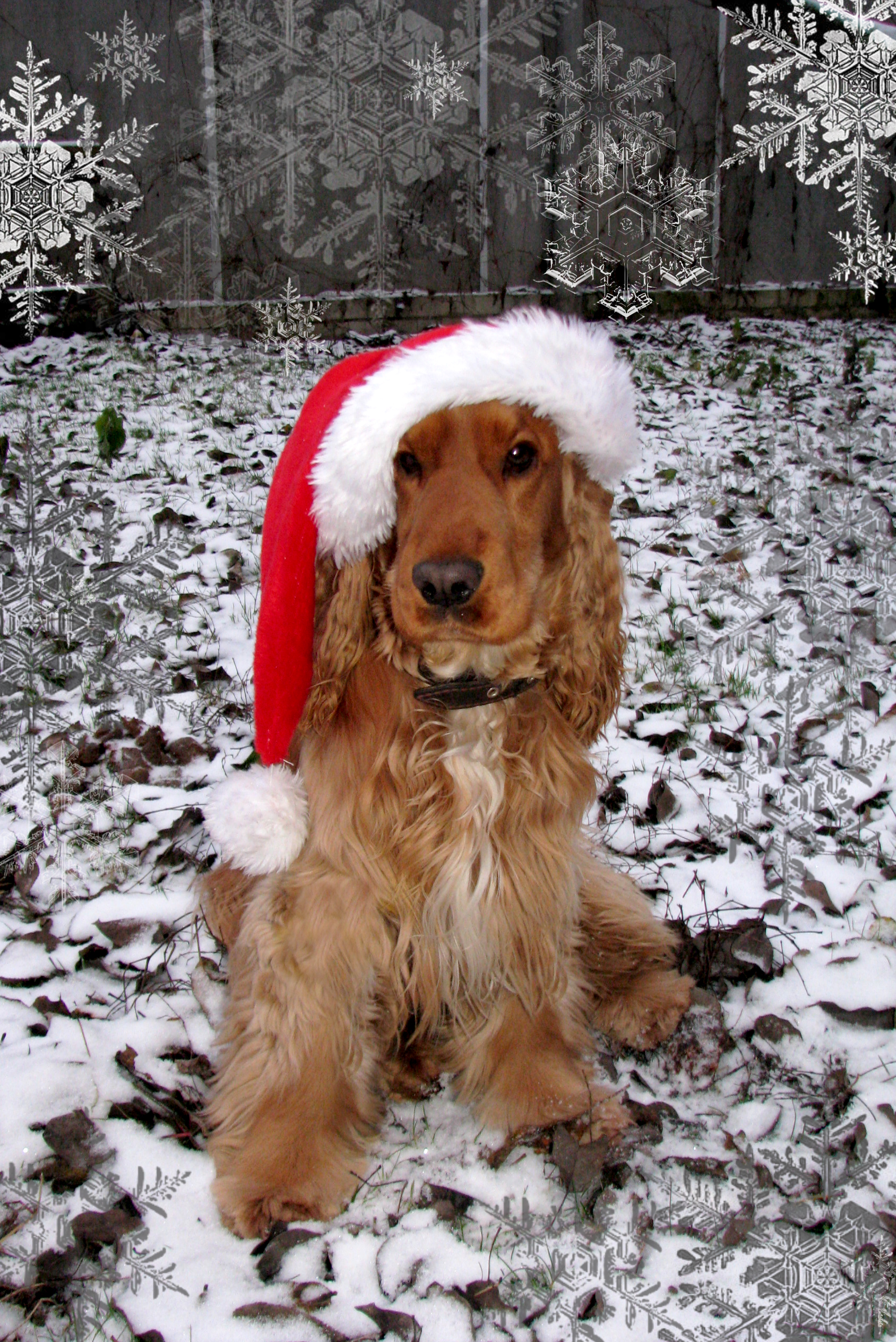
Christmas card made on a PC

Christmas postcards

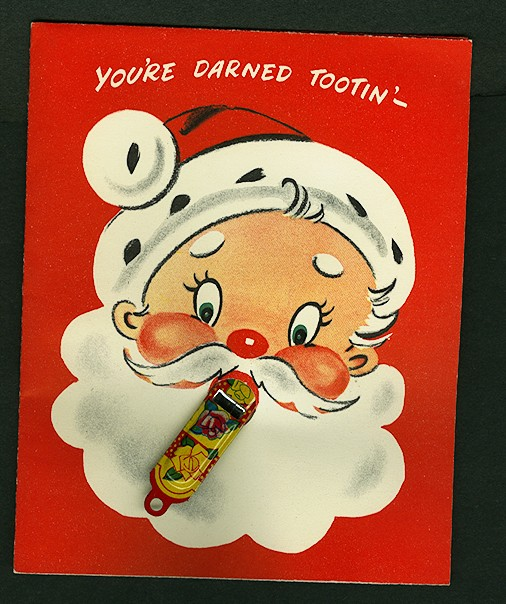
American card, c. 1940

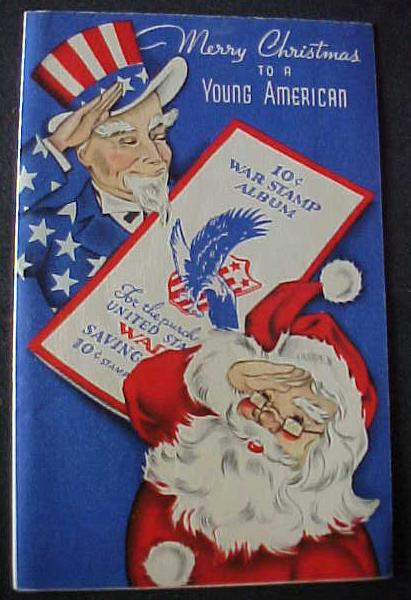
War-related, c. 1943

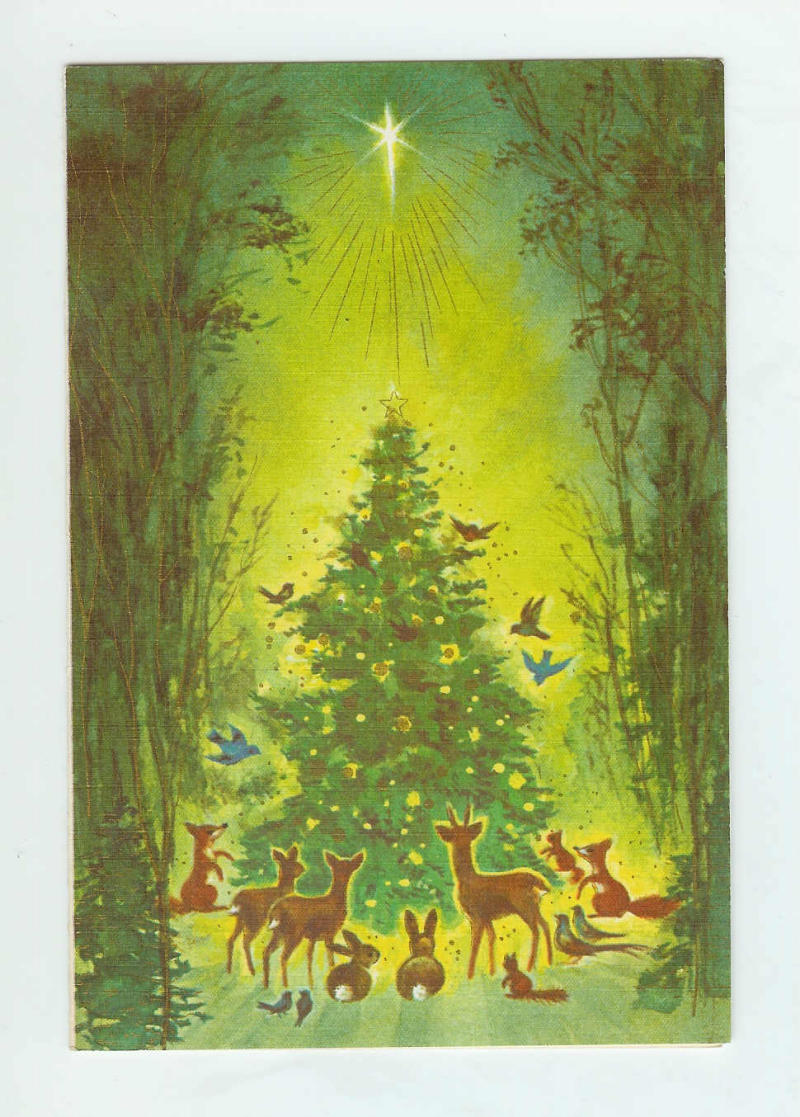
Rust Craft, c. 1950

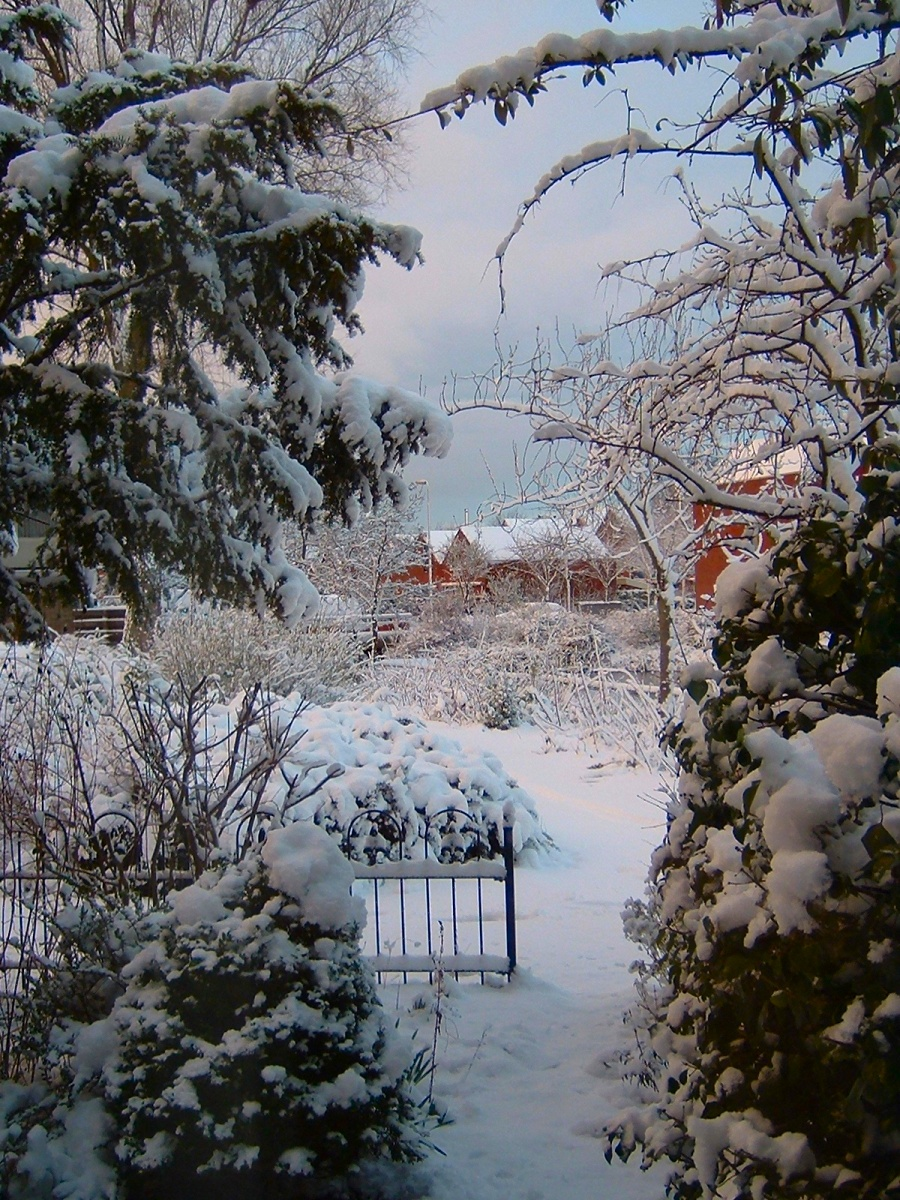
Snow in the Netherlands

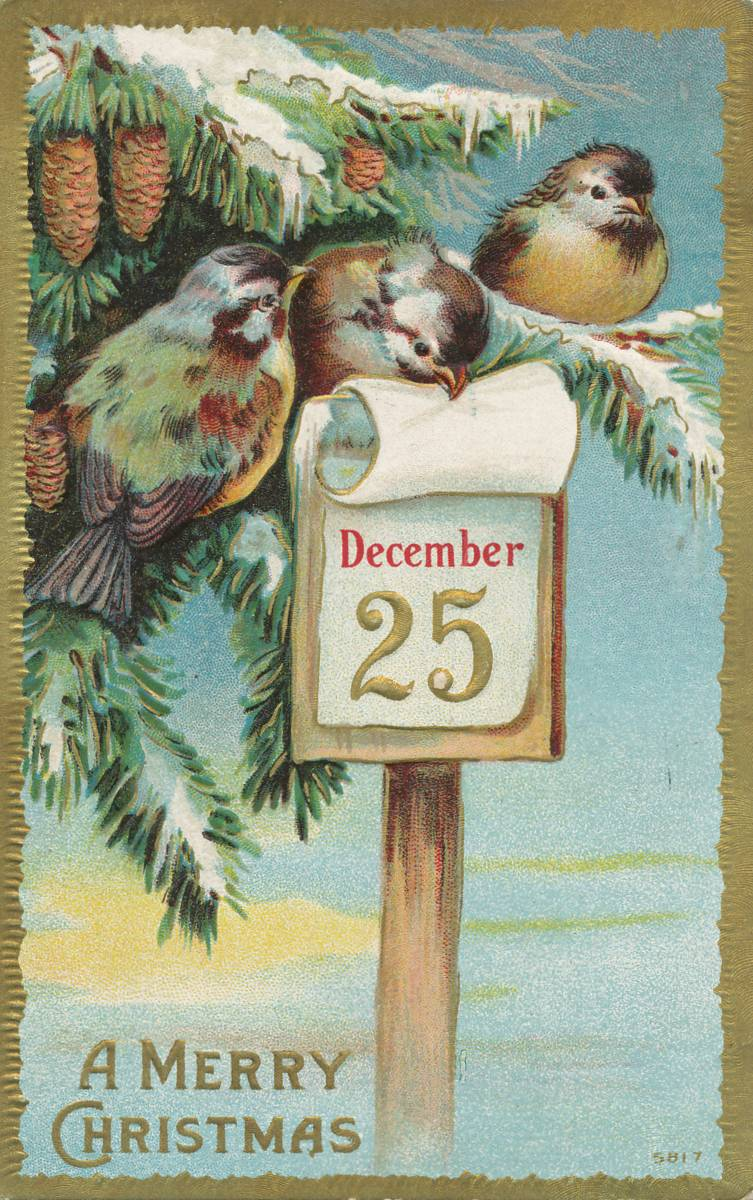
Christmas card

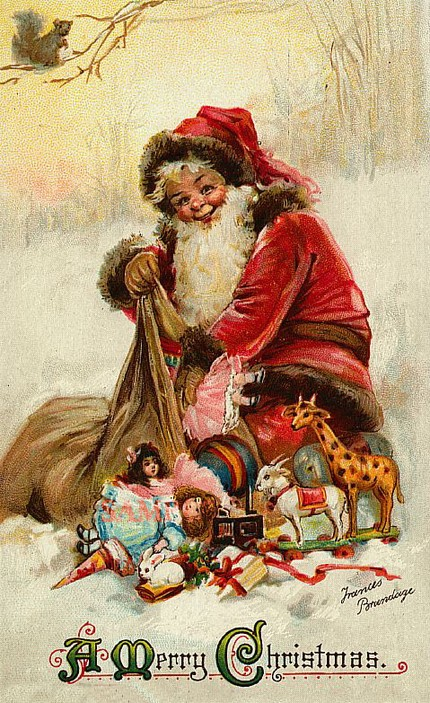
Christmas card Frances Brundage

Merry Christmas card

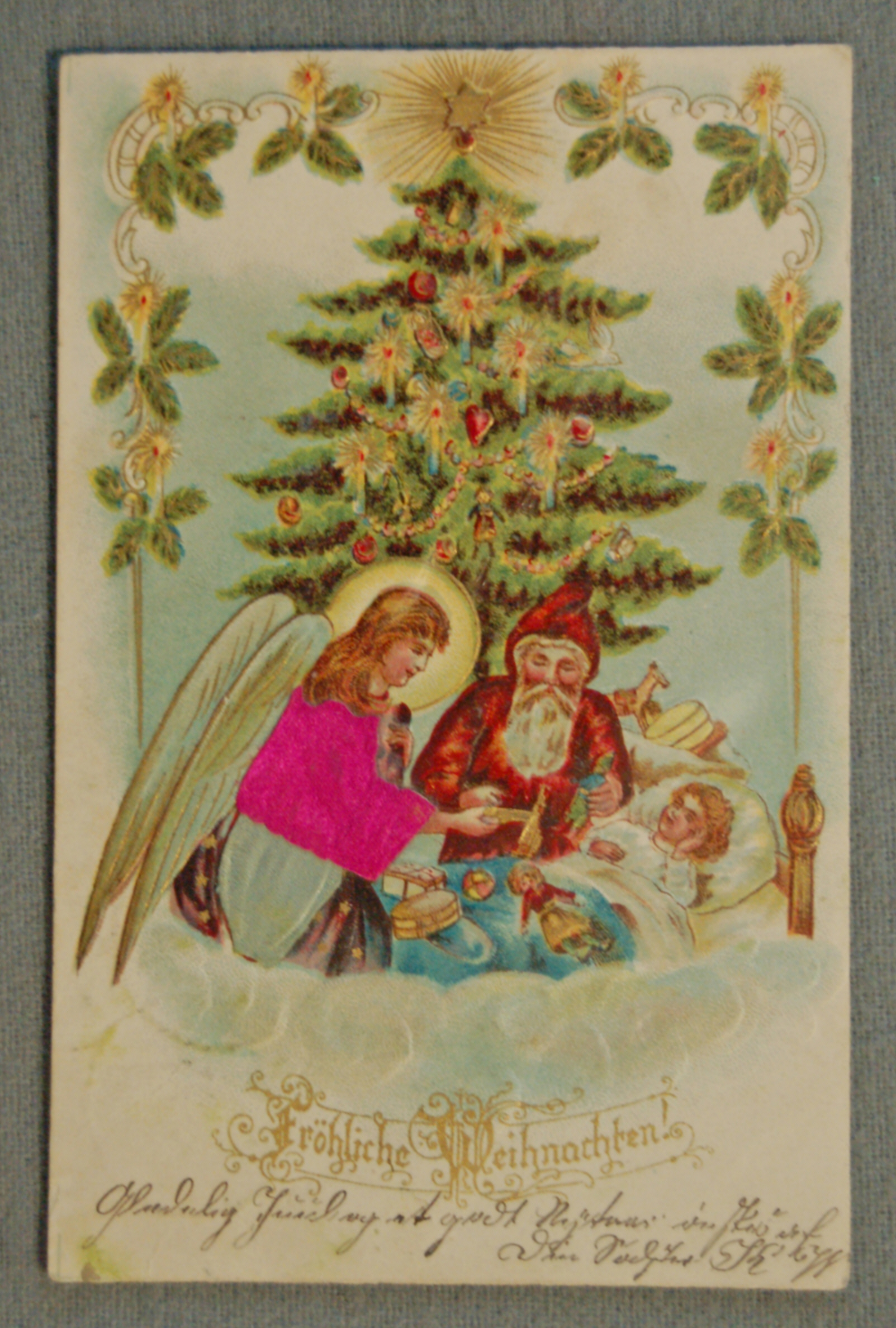
Christmas card

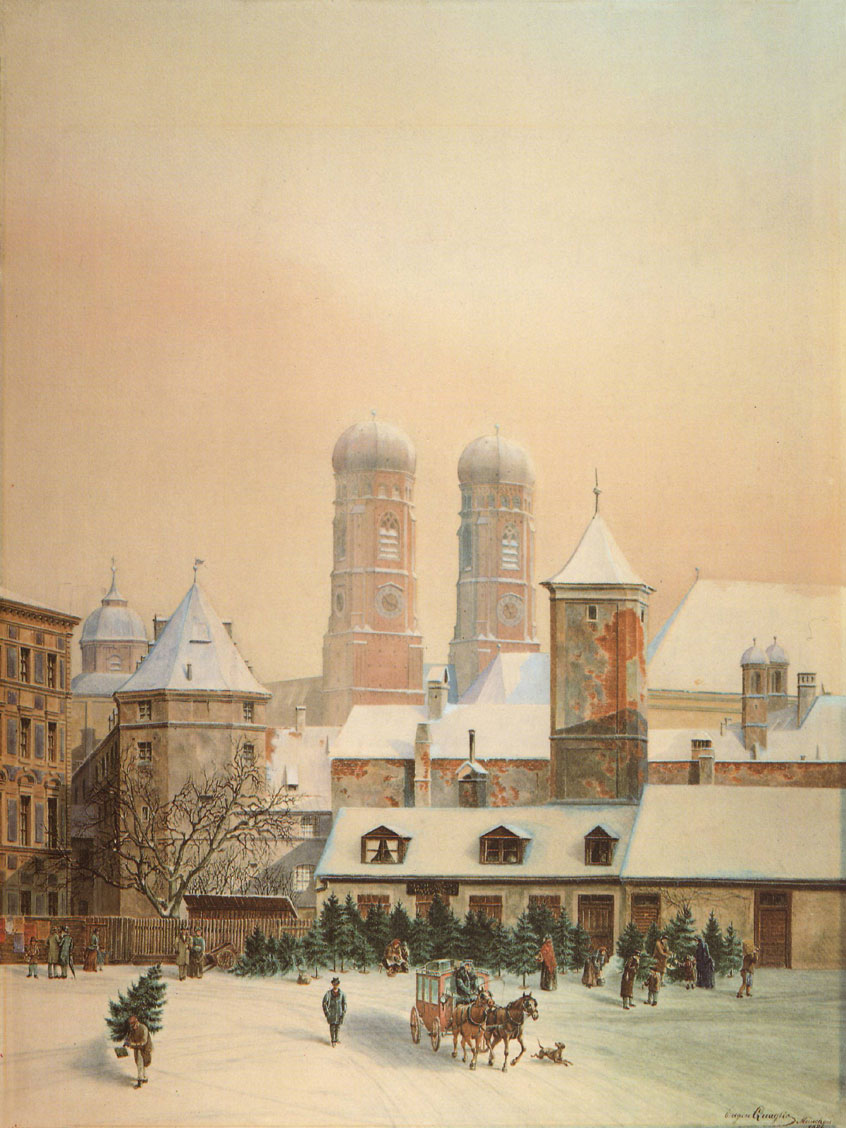
Christmas tree market

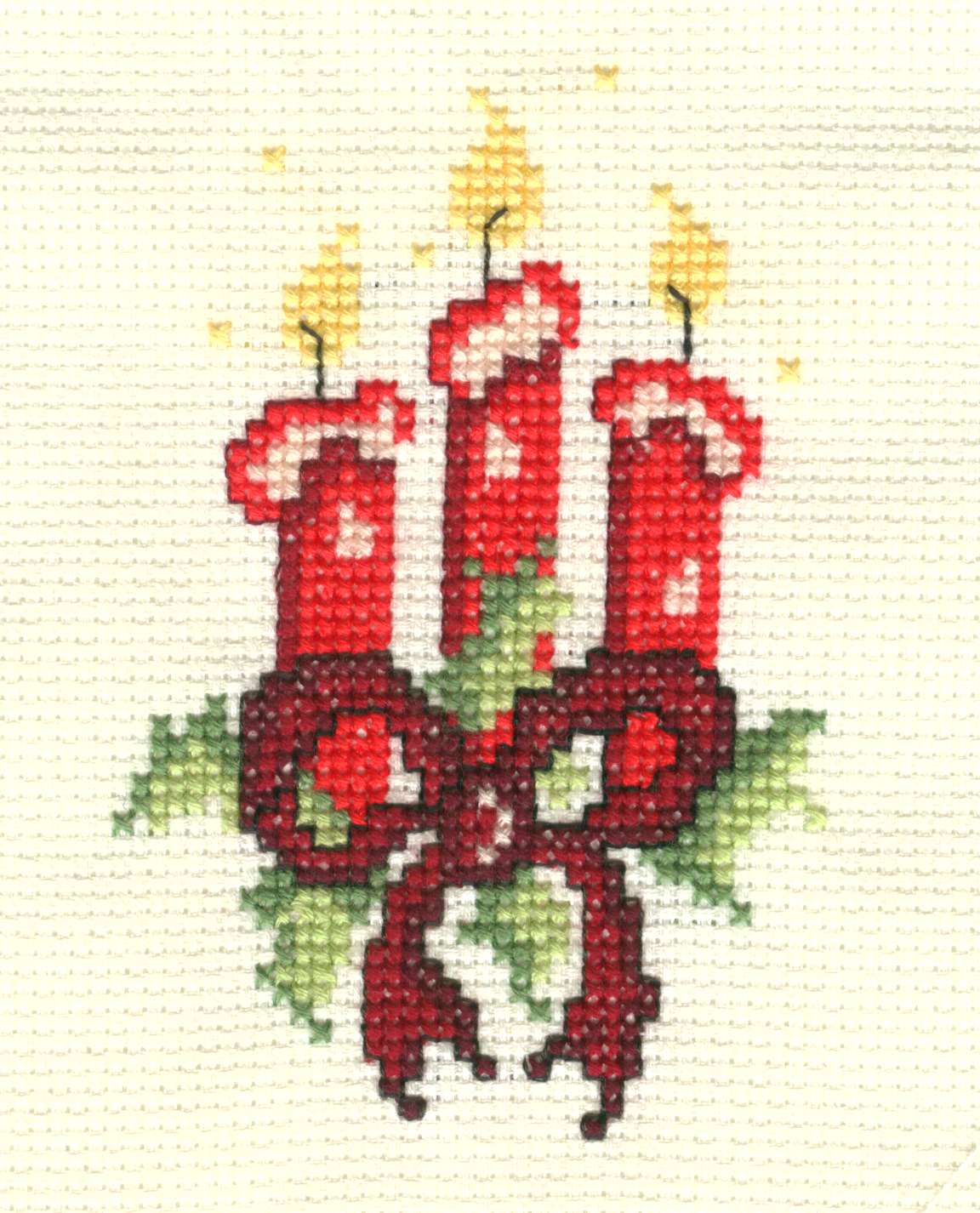
Christmas card with embroidery

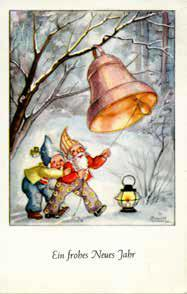
Christmas card

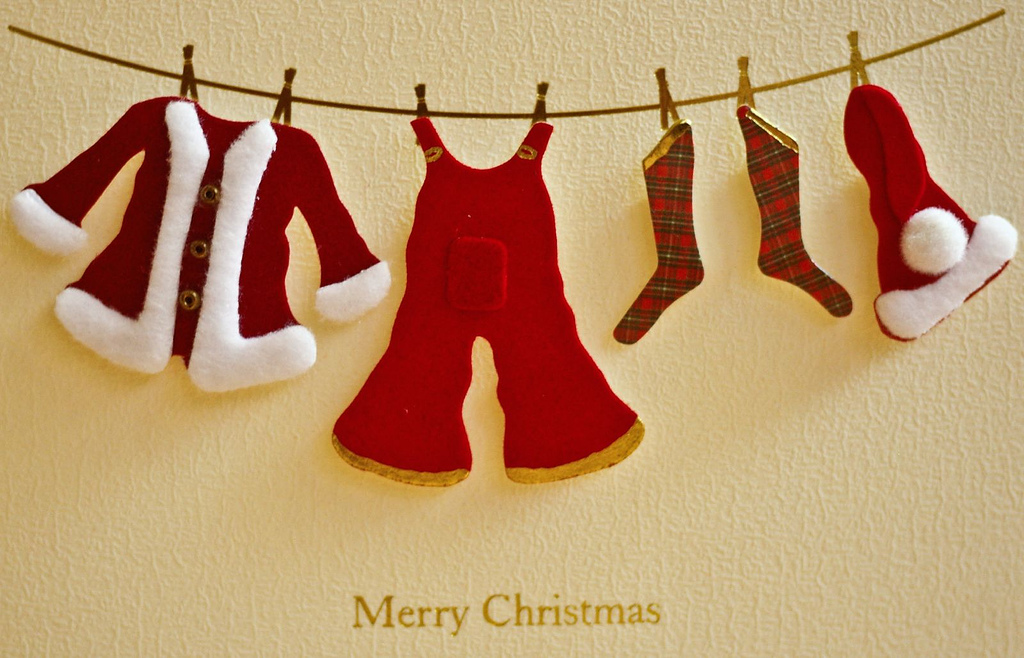
Santa Claus clothes
