= Christmas Letter Mission =

The Christmas Letter Mission was an English charity established in the 19th century, which aimed to send a Christmas card to every hospital patient in England. The card was accompanied by a letter. The charity had its origins in a programme set up by Miss E. E. Steele Elliott in 1871 and overseen by a church in Brighton, which aimed to send Christmas cards to all patients in the county of Sussex. The charity's aims later expanded again to include prisoners and those in workhouses, police officers, railway workers, post office employees and others. The cards were distributed on Christmas Eve by local volunteers organised by a county secretary.
