= Brundage =

Brundage may refer to:

- Brundage, Texas, an unincorporated community in the United States
- Brundage Mountain, an alpine ski area in west central Idaho, United States
- Brundage (surname)
