= Brundish =

Village in Suffolk, England

Coordinates: 52.276915°N 1.326149°E

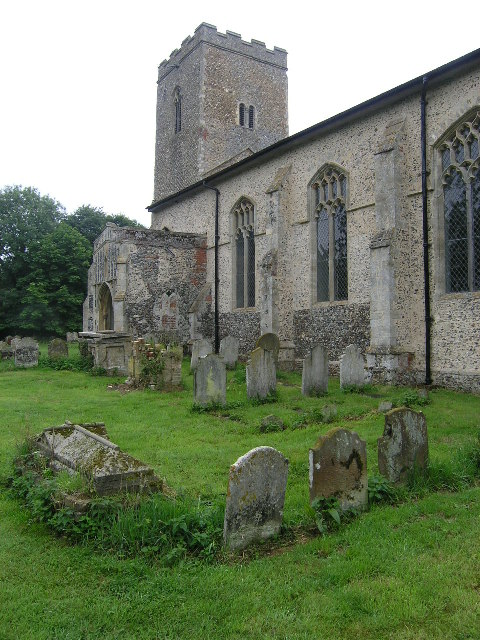
- Church of St Lawrence

- Location within Suffolk
- Population: 287 (2011 census)
- District: Mid Suffolk
- Shire county: Suffolk
- Region: East
- Country: England
- Sovereign state: United Kingdom
- Post town: Woodbridge
- Postcode district: IP13
- UK Parliament: Central Suffolk and North Ipswich

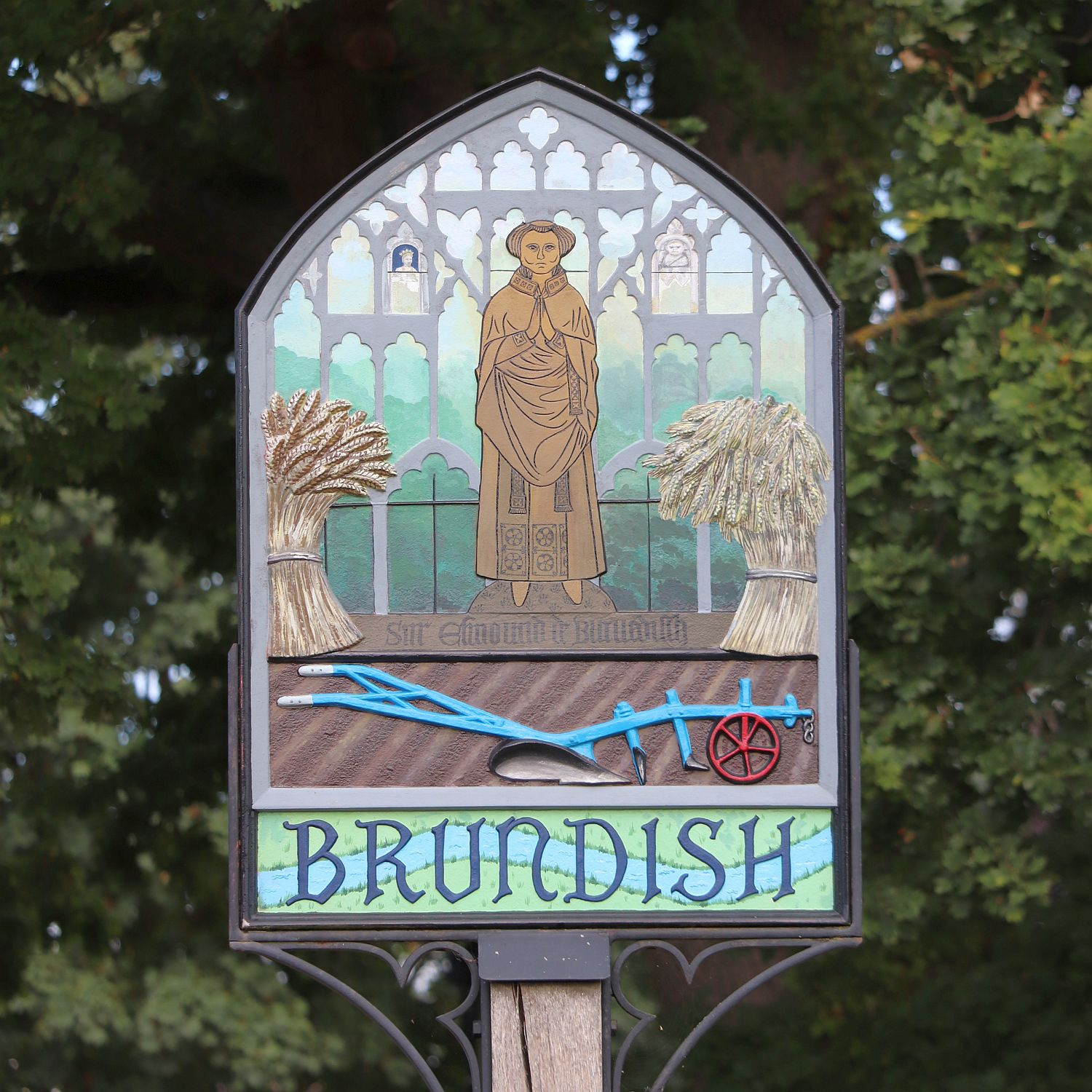
Brundish Village Sign, Suffolk

Brundish is a village and civil parish in the English county of Suffolk. The village is 3.6 miles (6 km) south-east of Stradbroke and 1.75 miles (3 km) north of Dennington in the Mid Suffolk district. The B1118 road runs through the village, which had a population at the 2001 census of 192, including Tannington, increasing to 287 at the 2011 Census.

The village church is dedicated to St Lawrence. The hamlet of Crown Corner, where the former village pub is located (now a residence), lies north of the village along the B1118. The nearest secondary school is at Stradbroke. Children attend primary school in Wilby, the former village school now being used as the village hall and IT training centre.

The name Brundish originates from the old English words burna (stream) and edisc (pasture); the surname Brundage originates from it.
