= Earthquake McGoon =

Earthquake McGoon may refer to:

- Earthquake McGoon, a fictional character in the Li'l Abner comic strip
- Earthquake McGoon, nickname of American pilot James B. McGovern Jr. (1922–1954)
- Earthquake McGoon, Thoroughbred winner of the 1979 The Metropolitan horse race
- Earthquake McGoon's, Dixieland jazz nightclubs, in San Francisco, owned by Turk Murphy (1915–1987)
  - Live at Earthquake McGoon's, a 1961 album by Turk Murphy and Ernie Carson (1937–2012)
  - Live at Earthquake McGoon's, a 1966 album by Clancy Hayes (1908–1972)
  - Live at Earthquake McGoon's, a 1970 album by Firehouse Five Plus Two
  - The Earthquake McGoon Recordings, a 1973 album by Turk Murphy
- Earthquake McGoon's Brain Rattler, a rollercoaster at Dogpatch USA built by Chance Rides
- Several Boeing B-17 Flying Fortress heavy bombers during World War II; see Sir Baboon McGoon
