= Tannington =

Village in Suffolk, England

Coordinates: 52.259962°N 1.28626°E

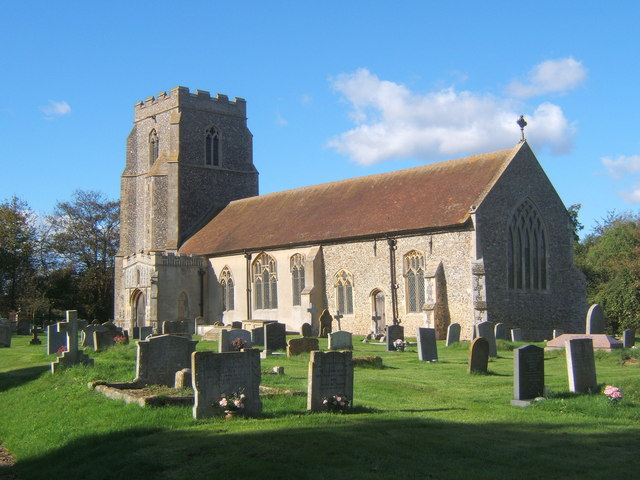
- Church of St Ethelbert

- Location within Suffolk
- Population: 110
- District: Mid Suffolk
- Shire county: Suffolk
- Region: East
- Country: England
- Sovereign state: United Kingdom
- Post town: Woodbridge
- Postcode district: IP13
- Police: Suffolk
- Fire: Suffolk
- Ambulance: East of England

Tannington is a village and civil parish in the Mid Suffolk district of Suffolk in eastern England. Located around ten miles south-east of Diss, in 2005 its population was 110. At the 2011 Census the population had fallen below 100, and not therefore being maintained on this site was included in the civil parish of Brundish.

== History ==
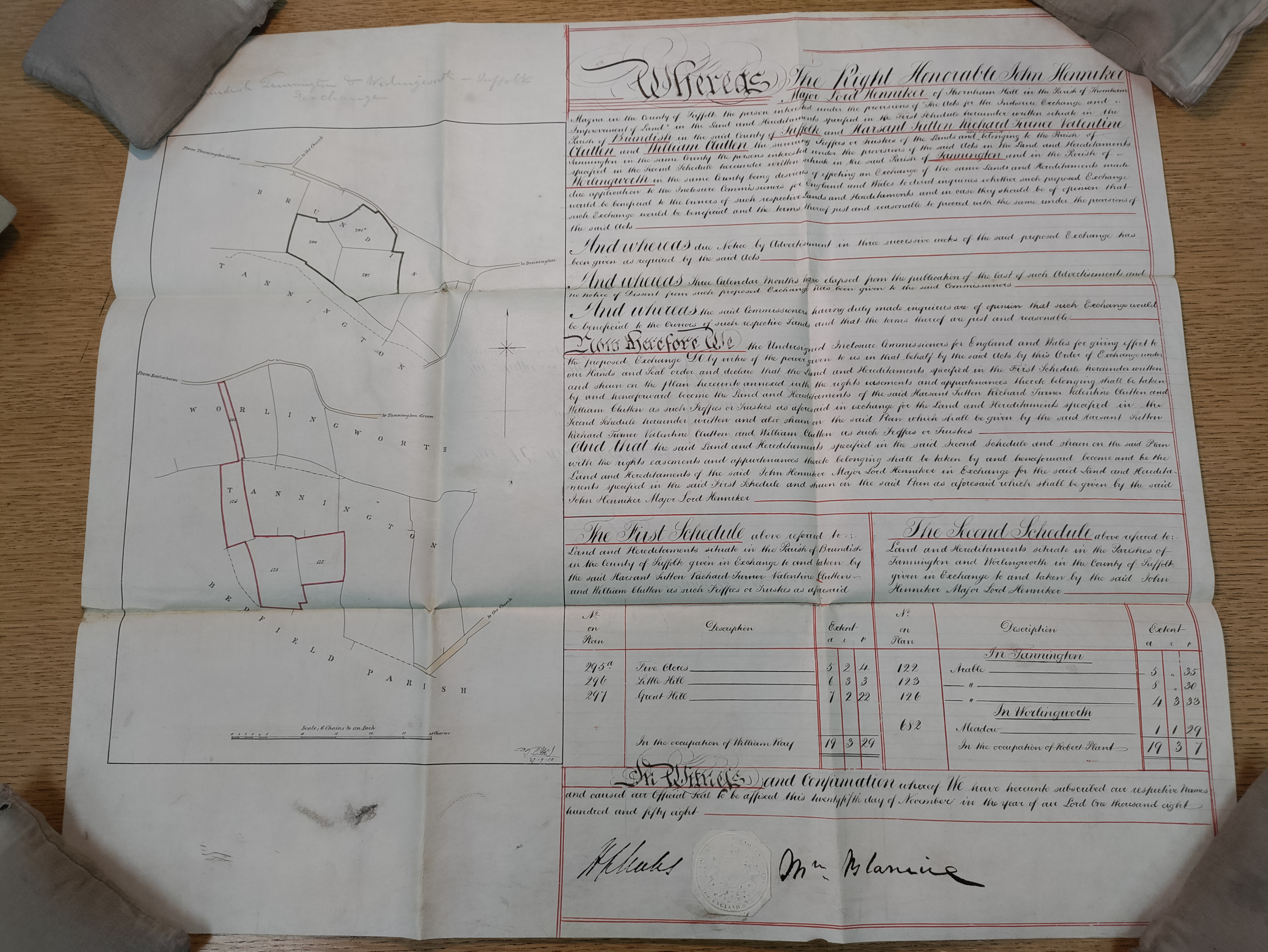
An Enclosure Award within Tannington dating from 1858.

=== World War II bomber incident ===
Late in the afternoon of 10 October 1943, an American B-17 Flying Fortress, serial number 42-3506 nicknamed Sir Baboon McGoon, ran out of fuel and made a belly landing in a soft and muddy sugar beet field in the village of Tannington. Efforts of a mobile recovery crew to repair the aircraft, and the aircraft's return to service, were documented in Popular Science magazine. The aircraft was lost for good when it ditched into the North Sea on 29 March 1944, while returning from a bombardment mission over Brunswick, Germany. The Popular Science article about the belly landing in Tannington appeared two months later, in the June 1944 issue.
