= Brundage (surname) =

Brundage is an English habitational surname originating from the English village of Brundish. It may refer to the following notable people:

- Amanda Brundage (born 1991), American mixed martial artist
- Avery Brundage (1887–1975), American sports administrator
- Cody Brundage (born 1994), American mixed martial artist, husband of Amanda
- Dave Brundage (born 1964), American professional baseball manager
- Dewey Brundage (1931–2022), American professional football player
- Edward J. Brundage (1869–1934), American lawyer and politician
- Frances Brundage (1854–1937), American illustrator
- Jackson Brundage (born 2001), American actor
- James A. Brundage (1929–2021), American historian
- Jennifer Brundage (born 1973), American softball player
- Margaret Brundage (1900–1976), American illustrator and painter
- Mathilde Brundage (1859–1939), American actress
- Percival Brundage (1892–1979), American accountant
- Slim Brundage (1903–1990), American anarchist
- W. Fitzhugh Brundage, American historian
