= Wilby, Suffolk =

Village in Suffolk, England

Coordinates: 52.301°N 1.286°E

Wilby
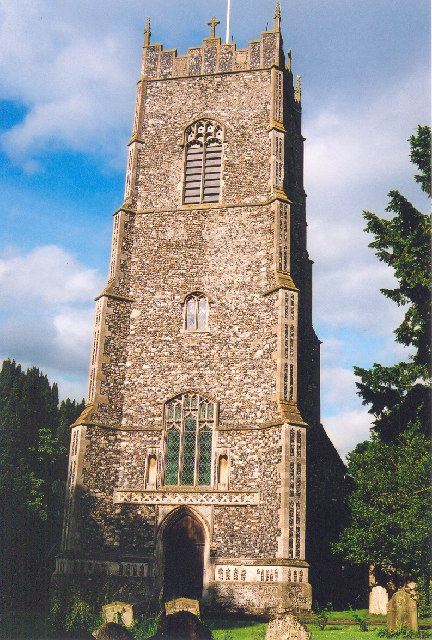
- Church of St Mary

- Location within Suffolk
- Population: 231
- OS grid reference: TM242721
- District: Mid Suffolk
- Shire county: Suffolk
- Region: East
- Country: England
- Sovereign state: United Kingdom
- Post town: Eye
- Postcode district: IP21
- Dialling code: 01379
- Police: Suffolk
- Fire: Suffolk
- Ambulance: East of England
- UK Parliament: Central Suffolk and North Ipswich

Wilby is a village and civil parish in the Mid Suffolk district of Suffolk in eastern England located around 9 miles (14 km) south-east of Diss and 1.25 miles (2 km) south of Stradbroke along the B1118. The population of the parish at the 2001 census was 231 in 99 households. The village has some basic services including a primary school and village hall.

The nearest villages are Brundish, Laxfield, Stradbroke and Worlingworth. Foals Green, Russel's Green, Stanway Green and Wootten Green (part) form part of the village which is dispersed in nature.

== History ==
The name of the village is generally believed to be derived from the Old English meaning 'Ring of Willows'. The village is mentioned in the Domesday Book at which time it comprised seven households and formed part of the holding of William de Beaufeu, Bishop of Thetford.

In 1844, White's Directories lists Thomas Corbett (Lincolnshire MP) as lord of the manor

== Church ==
The village church is dedicated to St Mary. It is medieval in origin and includes a 15th-century tower and a series of bench ends from the same century which are one of the finest collections in East Anglia. The current vicar is Rev'd David Burrell who holds one Sunday service a week. St Mary's is a Grade I listed building. Newton Wilby Hall, a Grade II listed building, is a 16th-century farmhouse with an intact medieval moat.

== School ==
The village school serves around 100 children aged 5 to 11. It is currently judged as 'Good' by Ofsted and has a link to a school in Mbauro in Kenya. At 11 children usually transfer to Stradbroke High School.

== Village hall ==
The village hall, which stands on the B1118, close to the centre of the village and opposite the school, is named Coronation Hall to commemorate the coronation of Her Majesty Queen Elizabeth II in 1953. Officially opened on Saturday 28 May 1955, it was one of the first village halls in Suffolk to be made by voluntary labour.

== Transport ==
Between 1908 and 1952 the village was served by Wilby railway station on the Mid-Suffolk Light Railway with the nearest operational railway station now at Diss.

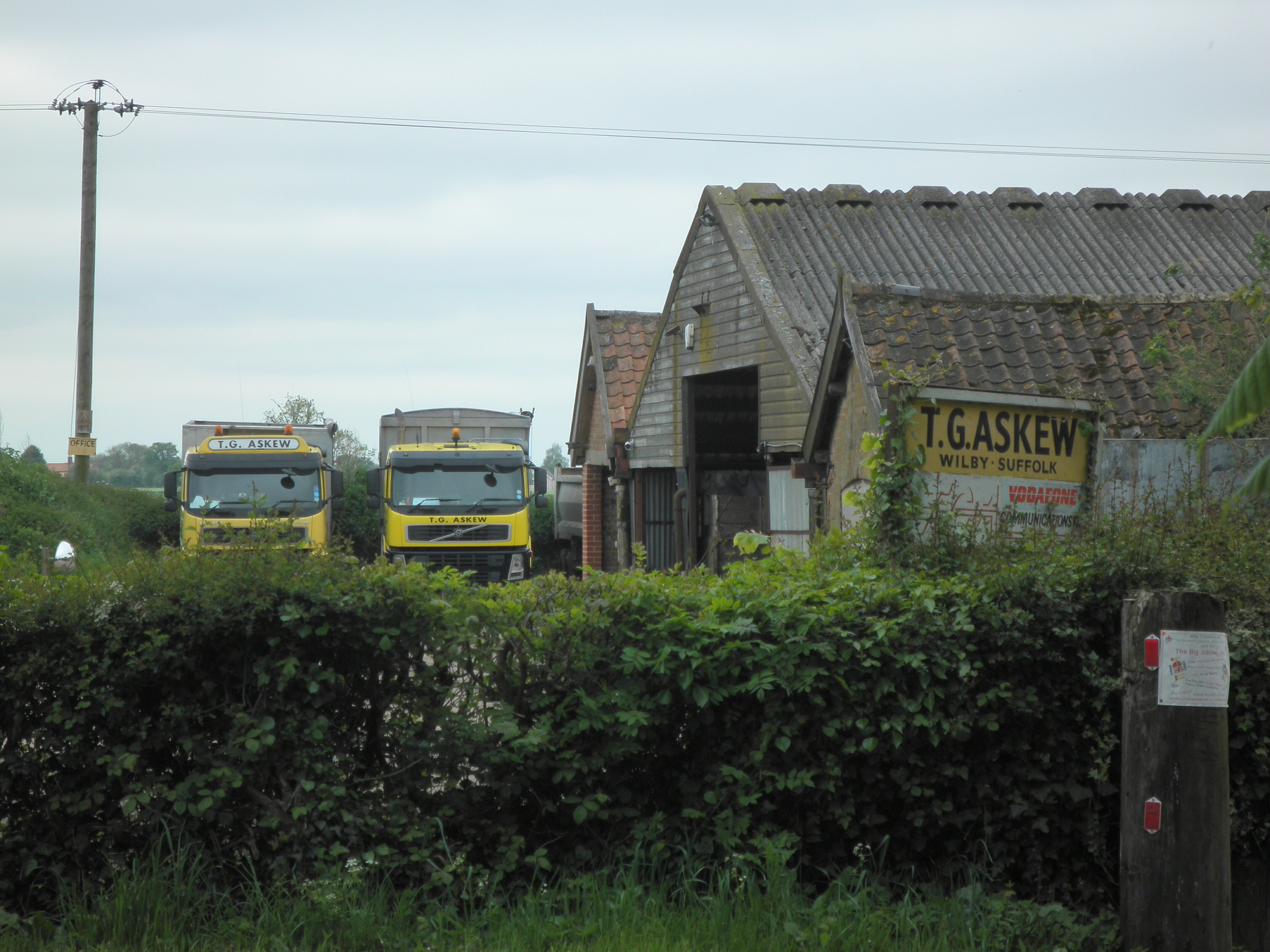
T G Askews is one of the two road haulage companies based in Wilby.
