= Sir Baboon McGoon =

B-17 bomber of the US Army Air Forces

- The plane after its belly landing in England in October 1943

General information
- Type: Boeing B-17F-75-DL Flying Fortress
- Manufacturer: Douglas Aircraft Company, Long Beach, California
- Owners: US Army Air Force (USAAF)
- Construction number: 8442
- Serial: 42-3506

History
- In service: 1943–1944
- Fate: Ditched after collision with a friendly bomb on 29 March 1944

Sir Baboon McGoon was an American Boeing B-17 Flying Fortress last assigned to the 324th Bombardment Squadron, 91st Bomb Group, 8th Air Force, operating out of RAF Bassingbourn (AAF Station 121), Cambridgeshire, England. The plane was featured in Popular Science magazine following an October 1943 belly landing in England. It was recovered and repaired, then later ditched in the North Sea on 29 March 1944 after a bombing run over Germany—the plane's 10-man crew all survived but became prisoners of war.

== History ==
The plane was built as a B-17F-75-DL by Douglas Aircraft Corporation at the Long Beach, California, plant under license from Boeing. It was assigned serial number 42-3506 and delivered on 12 July 1943. The plane's nose art and name were apparently derived from a character in Al Capp's comic strip Li'l Abner—Earthquake McGoon, (Note: At least two B-17s were named "Earthquake McGoon" (42-38209 and 43-37597); it was also the nickname of pilot James B. McGovern Jr.) who in at least one 1943 comic strip serving as an advertisement for Cream of Wheat was referred to as "Baboon McGoon" by Mammy Yokum.

=== Belly landing ===
On 10 October 1943, the aircraft ran out of fuel while returning to RAF Bassingbourn, and made a belly landing in a wet and muddy sugar beet field near the village of Tannington, Suffolk, England. Its recovery was described in an article in the June 1944 issue of Popular Science magazine, as well as a 1945 article in Flying magazine. The article describes how the aircraft was jacked up in the sugar beet field. Once on its own gear, it was determined that it could be flown out of the field and several weeks of mobile repairs resulted in the engines and propellers being replaced and temporary patches being applied. An 1,800-foot-long (550 m) steel mesh temporary runway allowed the aircraft to depart the sugar beet field in November 1943 and fly to a maintenance depot for more extensive repairs.

Squadron records of the 324th BS indicate that Sir Baboon McGoon returned to Bassingbourn on 19 February 1944. It flew seven additional missions from 24 February 1944 until its final mission just over a month later.

=== Final mission ===
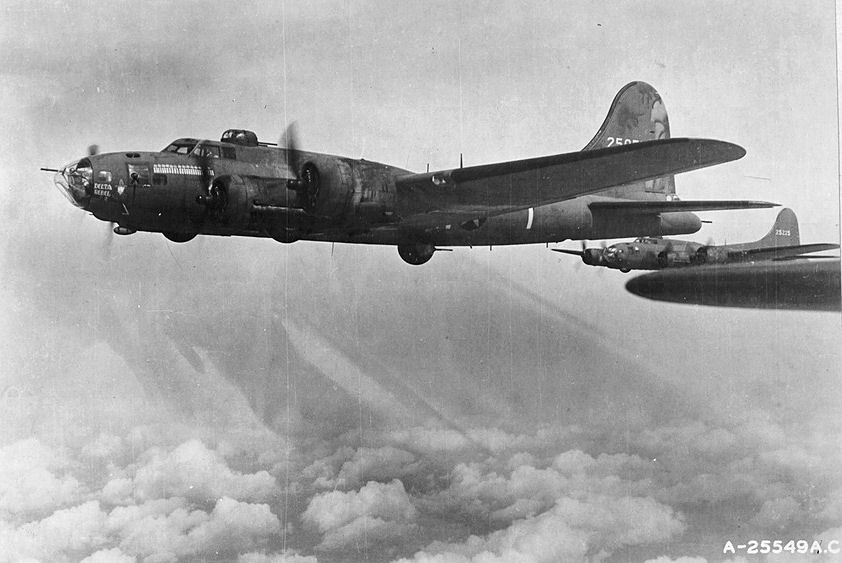
B-17Fs, similar to Sir Baboon McGoon, with the 323rd Bombardment Squadron

The 10-man crew for the plane's final mission on 29 March 1944, was headed by 2Lt Edgar C Downing. Most of his crew had flown other missions, and they had flown this particular aircraft on one previous mission since its return to service. The crew members described it as "a real crate" of an airplane, with many patches and quirks. The assigned mission for that day was a bombing run to Braunschweig (Brunswick, Germany). As their portion of the formation arrived over the primary target, the crew reported that the target area was obscured by clouds or smoke, so they proceeded to their secondary target.

Bombs released from a bomber above them struck one of their engines (believed by the crew to be number 4, the right-outboard engine). This shut down one engine, but the propeller couldn't be properly feathered and there was damage to the electrical and/or hydraulic systems. Their troubles mounted when they attempted to drop their bombs and the bomb bay doors had to be manually opened and the bombs released manually. Once the bombs were gone, the crew was unable to close the bomb bay doors. The increased drag of a non-feathered propeller and the open bomb bay doors, combined with the lost power from one inoperative engine, caused them to slow down and forced them to fall out of formation. The crew recalls that they were then attacked by German fighter aircraft and they lost one or two more engines and had to drop down to the cloud deck (tops around 5,000 feet (1,500 m)) to attempt to continue flying. The aircraft was headed west towards England, but was lower than their formations and unable to keep up. Witness crew members from a 323rd Bomb Squadron aircraft reported losing sight of the missing aircraft about 30 minutes (east of) the Zuider Zee, but that the aircraft was continuing on course, just lower and slower. The witnesses reported that the engines were feathered, but crew statements suggest that the engines were not turning, however the propellers were not feathered either.

As the accident aircraft continued westward, the crew was ordered to lighten the load by jettisoning all the extra weight that they could. The ball turret gunner was able to get back into the plane and so they jettisoned the ball turret. One crew member stated that they probably jettisoned any emergency radio they may have had, because they didn't have one in the life rafts. Approximately 4 p.m. and 20 nautical miles (23 mi; 37 km) west of the coast, they were firmly over the North Sea as darkness approached. They were flying on one sputtering engine, and they had approximately 80 to 90 nautical miles (92 to 104 mi; 150 to 170 km) to go to make the English coast. The pilot polled his crew and a unanimous decision was made to attempt a controlled ditching with the limited remaining power, rather than pressing on and facing a forced ditching with no power, quite likely in the dark. Based on previous boating experience, the pilot ditched, but 90 degrees different than the recommended procedure—following his return to service, the ditching procedures were changed to match his successful method.

A successful ditching was made, and the entire 10-man crew evacuated through the top hatch. They deployed their two five-man life rafts and pushed away in just in time to watch their aircraft sink in the North Sea. The crew recalls that they were cold, sore, injured, and angry. They watched formations of bombers returning to England, and a lone German aircraft came and circled their position once and could have strafed them, but didn't. It appeared to return perhaps an hour later. Struggling to keep their two rafts together in heavy 5-foot (1.5 m) waves, they feared they would freeze or drown in the icy water at approximately 60 degrees north latitude. After darkness fell, they began launching flares every half-hour or so until a boat arrived and rescued them.

=== Aftermath ===
The crew were initially taken to a jail near the streetcar line. Subsequently, they were ordered onto a train and transported to the DuLag (DurchgangsLager, transfer camp), and about April 1944 the crew had arrived in Luft Stalag 17-B in Krems, Austria, where they were held as prisoners of war for just over a year until the end of the war.

German records include documents for each of the 10-man crew. These documents are titled "Report On Capture of Members of Enemy Air Forces" and are shown with a "PLACE: 8th E-boat Flotilla, Haarlem". Each crew member was reported as being taken POW "At sea 28 nautical miles 300 degrees IJmuiden" on 29 March 1944 at 2125 (9:25 p.m.). IJmuiden is a coastal city where the Germans had hardened concrete E-boat pens for their Schnellboot (fast boats). Larger than an American PT boat, these boats probably were based from IJmuiden and the specific reference of time, distance and direction—28 nautical miles (32 mi; 52 km) 300 degrees west-northwest from IJmuiden at 2125 hours—provides a very specific location.

There is a table that estimates the drift rate for a five-man raft under those wind and wave conditions, which provides a reasonably accurate estimate for the location of the ditching around 4 p.m., followed by 5 hours and 25 minutes drifting in the rafts. The North Sea is approximately 80 feet (24 m) deep at the estimated ditching site.

The June 1944 issue of Popular Science featured the article of the successful restoration of Sir Baboon McGoon from its October 1943 belly landing. By the time the article appeared in print, the aircraft had been on the bottom of the North Sea for at least two months.
