= White House Card =

Visiting card

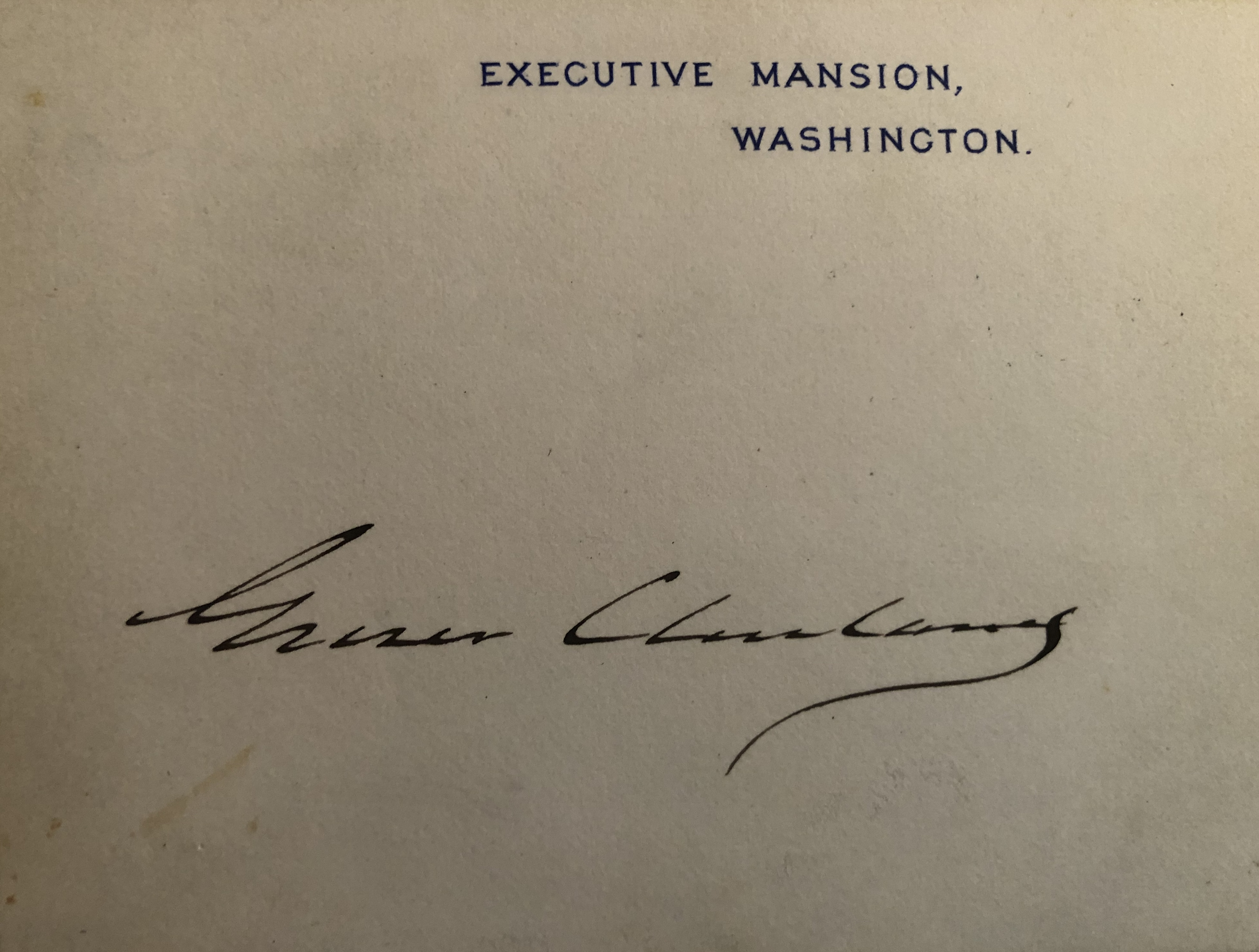
Grover Cleveland Executive Mansion Card

A White House Card or Executive Mansion Card was a card that was used by U.S. Presidents in the 19th and 20th century. The size of today's average business card - sextodecimo - these cards often contained a president's signature and sometimes a short message or sentiment.

== Early use ==
President Abraham Lincoln instituted the first printed presidential stationery, emblazoned with the heading, "Executive Mansion." Executive Mansion cards were first employed by President Ulysses S. Grant. These are extremely rare as only one is known to exist and it is dated by Grant as president. It is in the collection of Stephen Koschal. Executive Mansion cards signed by Rutherford B. Hayes are where collectors usually start their collections.

== Variations ==
Early President cards, such as Millard Fillmore's, were simply a blank card, approximately 4x6in. Presidents have also used visiting cards since the early 19th century, usually saying simply "The President" in ornate script. Signed examples of these cards occasionally come up for sale. Otherwise, it can be difficult to determine which president used the card.

The official Executive Mansion card of Rutherford B. Hayes contained the header, "Executive Mansion, Washington" on the upper left corner of the card. (Though some cards had the lettering in the center.) On later cards, such as William McKinley's, the header was displayed in the upper right corner.

President Grover Cleveland distinguished cards signed during his two non-consecutive terms in office by adding the year under his signature during his second term. President Benjamin Harrison preferred to respond to autograph requests by signing a card with an engraved view of the White House. Executive Mansion cards signed by Harrison, therefore, are somewhat scarce.

One month after taking office following McKinley's assassination, Theodore Roosevelt changed the name of the presidential residence from "Executive Mansion" to "White House," which it had been popularly called since 1810. With this, he ordered the Presidential stationery to also bear the name "White House" (later "The White House"), which can be seen on his cards as well. He signed a handful of "Executive Mansion" cards prior to the change, and these are rare collector's items.

Both Roosevelt and President Woodrow Wilson were concerned that an unscrupulous individual might attempt to append a message above their signatures. To prevent this, both tended to sign their names high on the left-hand side of the card. Later presidents, such as Calvin Coolidge, thwarted this possibility by making their signatures exceptionally large.

In addition to the normal White House card, President Warren G. Harding also signed a larger white card with no lettering, but with the presidential seal embossed in gold at the top.

Herbert Hoover was the last president to sign and distribute the cards routinely to anyone who asked. Starting with the administration of President Franklin D. Roosevelt, the vast increase in the president's workload meant the cards were increasingly signed by aides or secretaries, with authentic signatures being reserved for friends and political supporters. Signed White House cards by Franklin D. Roosevelt and Harry S Truman exist, but are less common than those of earlier presidents.

President Dwight D. Eisenhower began the practice of providing the card with a printed signature, beneath the sentiment "with best wishes." A printed or autopen signature thus became the norm. Occasionally, collectors were able to obtain authentic signatures, making these cards rare and valuable collector's items.

The design of the card remained essentially unchanged from the administration of Theodore Roosevelt through Jimmy Carter. Carter moved the lettering "The White House, Washington" to the left hand corner and added an engraved view of the South Portico of the White House. President George H. W. Bush also altered the card, moving the heading "The White House, Washington" back to the right hand corner, removing the view of the White House and adding a raised presidential seal in blue on the card's left side.

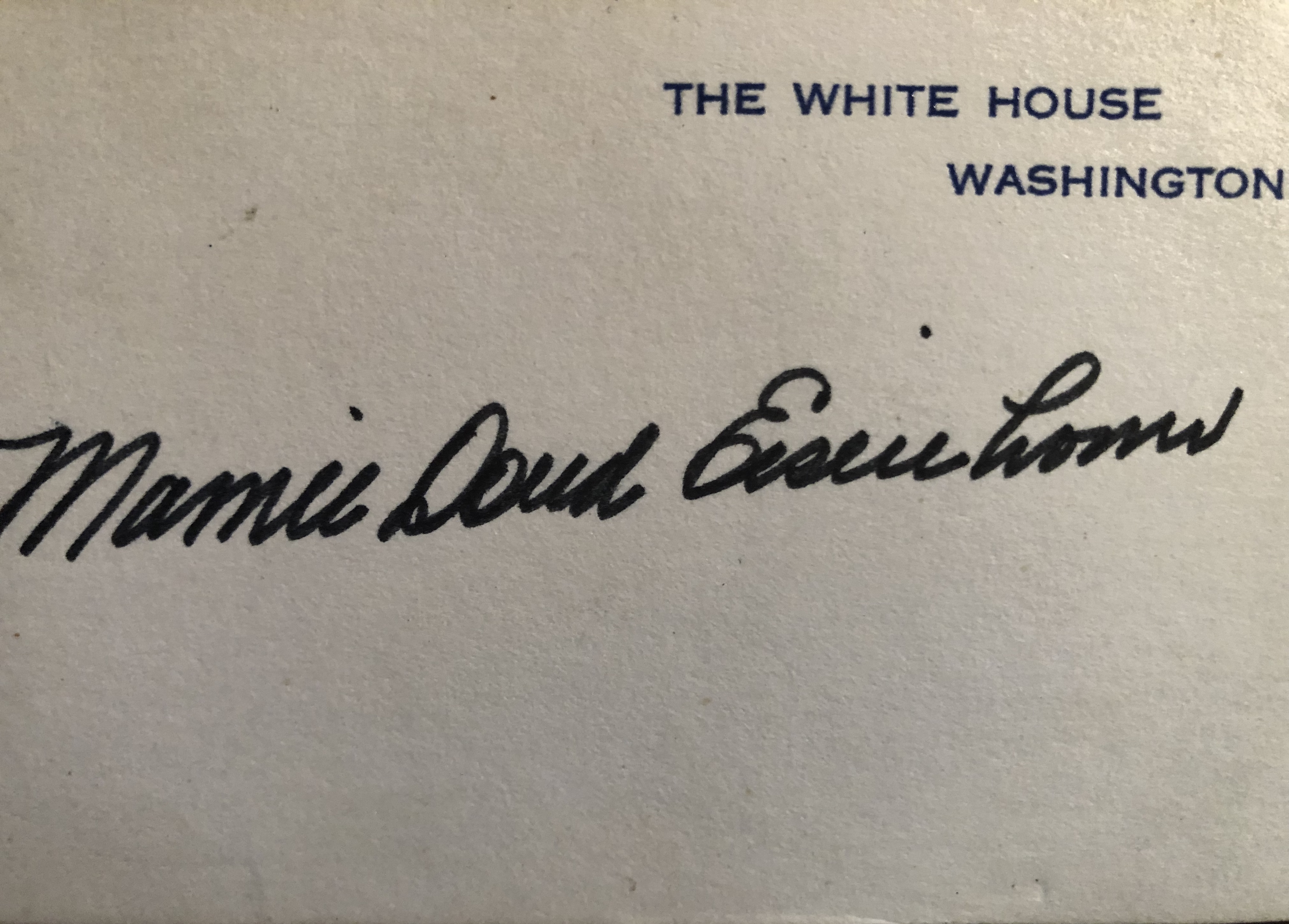
White House Card signed by First Lady Mamie Doud Eisenhower.

First Ladies also used the cards to fulfill autograph requests. Occasionally, other family members, such as Margaret Truman Daniel, as well as staff members, signed them as well. There is one known example signed by Edward, Prince of Wales, during a visit to the White House during the Coolidge Administration.

== White House Card use today ==
The White House card has fallen out of general use and has been replaced with the popular White House greeting cards. Today, receipt of these cards is restricted to U.S. citizens and requests are only fulfilled for a limited list of specified occasions.

== See also ==
- Carte de visite
- Visiting card
- Cabinet card
- White House
