= New Year card =

Greeting card conveying wishes for the New Year

Jewish New Year card

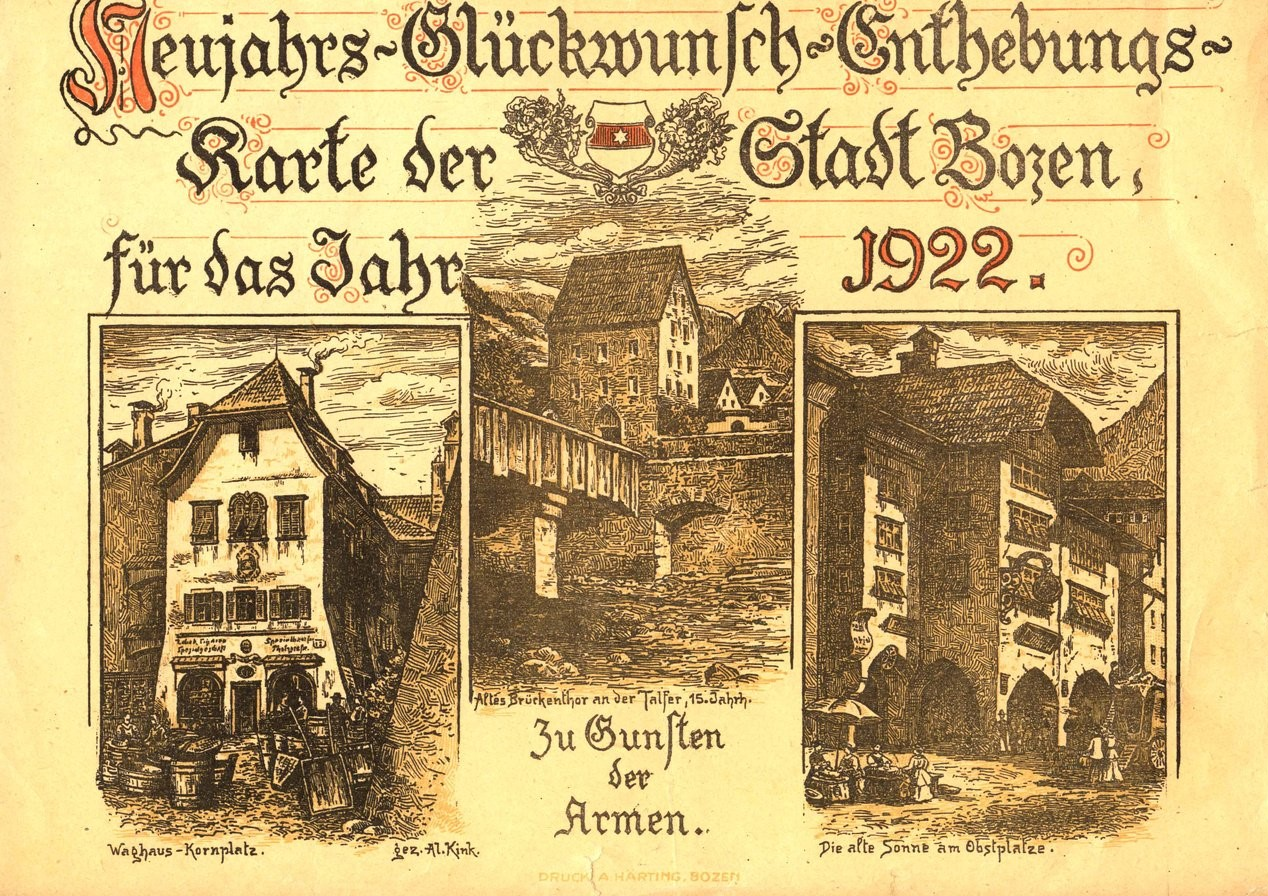
New year card from 1922, showing some Bozen-Bolzano's sites

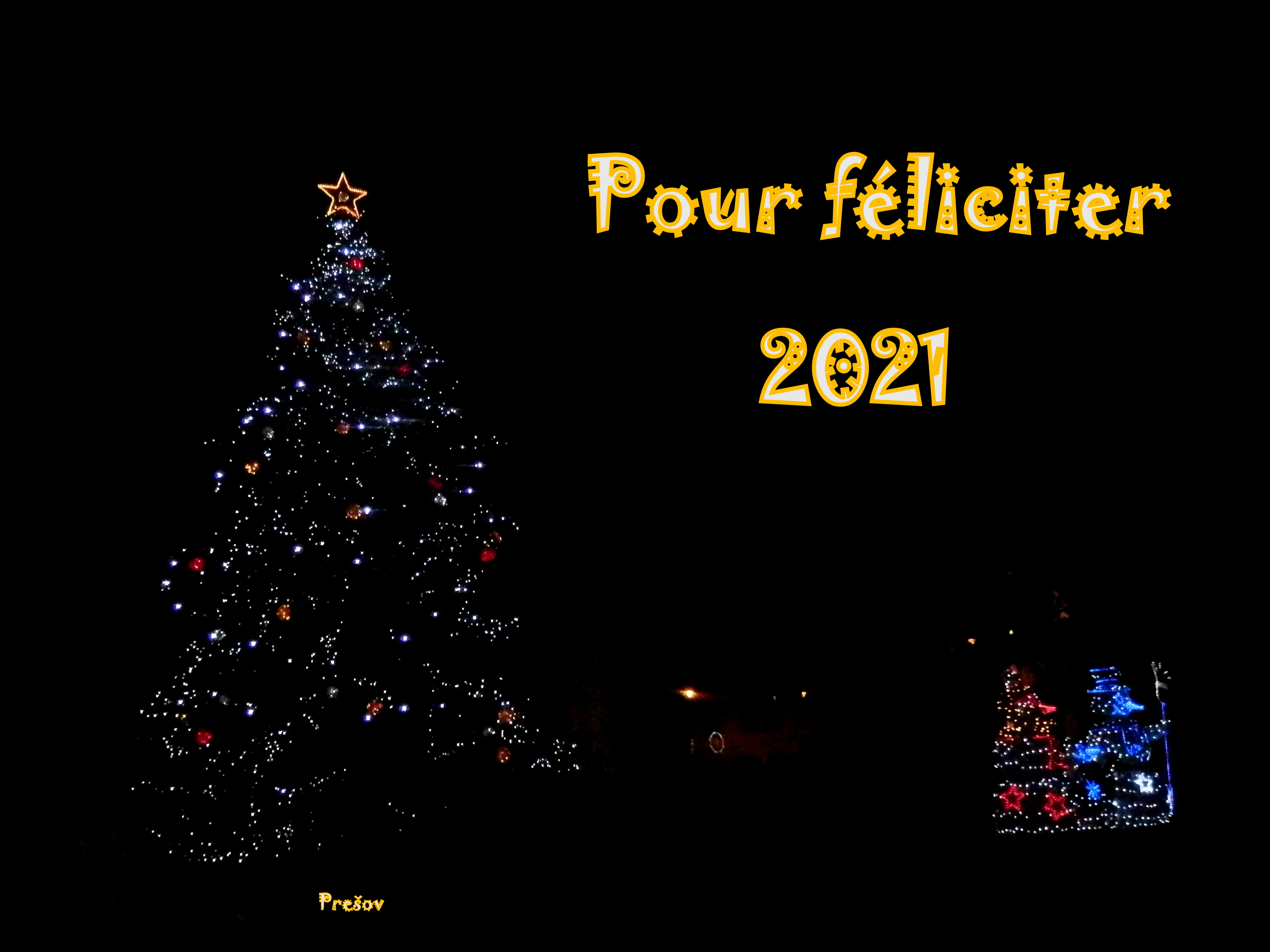
Pour féliciter 2021 New Year card from Prešov (by a wikipedia user)

== P.F. ==
P.F. (PF), standing for the French words "pour féliciter" (lit. "to congratulate"), is used as an abbreviation for New Year wish, expressing good wishes for the coming year or in social correspondence extending congratulations.

== Czech Republic, Slovakia, Czech lands ==
PF New Year cards are generally used only in the Czech Republic and Slovakia, former Czechoslovakia, being taken over from 19th century's Czech lands.

The phrase is not used in this sense in French-speaking nor other countries.

"On eSbirky [a web of the Czech National Museum] you will find countless of these small (and not only) graphic works with the classic abbreviation PF, or pour feliciter, translated as 'congratulations'."

– PF 2025, nm.cz, 1. January 2025

=== History ===
Following the tradition established by the New Year cards of Charles Chotek of Chotkow, the highest Burgrave of Bohemia (function roughly similar to a prime minister) between 1826 and 1843, today's Czechs and Slovaks continue to use PF (P.F.), together with the number of an upcoming year, standing for "wishing you all the happiness in the new year".

Chotek (reportedly) commissioned with (some of) his New Year cards Josef Bergler (1753–1829), a Bavarian painter, draftsman and engraver of the Classicist period, a representative of academicism, teacher and first director of the Academy of Fine Arts in Prague.

"Sending New Year's cards to family and friends spread during the 19th century, in the [Bohemian] environment. Count Karel Chotek allegedly contributed to their spread. In 1827, he realized that, apparently due to time constraints, he no longer wanted to visit a wide circle of his acquaintances for the New Year, so he had Josef Bergler, the first director of the Prague Academy, make congratulatory cards.
The painter and graphic artist Viktor Stretti wrote these two letters for the first time as a New Year's card at the turn of the 19th and 20th centuries."

– PF 2025, nm.cz, 1. January 2025
