= Stradbroke High School =

Upper school in Suffolk, England

Location
- Wilby Road; Stradbroke, Eye, Suffolk, IP21 5JN; England; 52.31499°N 1.27318°E

Information
- Type: Academy
- Established: 1953
- Department for Education URN: 137901 Tables
- Ofsted: Reports
- Headteacher: Karen Millar
- Staff: 35
- Gender: Mixed
- Age: 11 to 16
- Enrolment: ±320
- Capacity: 420
- Houses: Waveney, Blyth and Dove
- Colours: Red, Yellow and Green
- Website: http://www.stradbrokehigh.co.uk

Stradbroke High School is a secondary school with academy status for 11- to 16-year-olds in the village of Stradbroke in the English county of Suffolk. Founded in 1953 as a secondary modern school on the edge of the village, Stradbroke High School serves a catchment covering almost 400 square miles (1,000 km^{2}) including the parishes of Athelington & Horham, Fressingfield, Laxfield, Mendham, Wilby, Worlingworth, and Cratfield. As of 2006, this represents a catchment population of some 7,500 people. It usually has fewer than 400 pupils.

The school is small and therefore able to know and support each pupil individually. In 2018 the school's GCSE students attained the second highest results in Suffolk and Norfolk. The school was the highest performing secondary school in Suffolk for GCSE results in 2022 and 2023.

== Notable former pupils ==
- Television journalist Amelia Reynolds, from Fressingfield
- These Animal Men vocalist and lead guitarist Alexander (previously Roger) Boag
