= Frances Brundage =

American illustrator

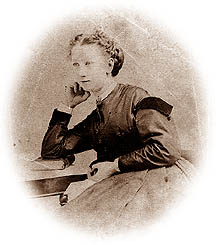
- Brundage c. 1870
- Born: Frances Isabelle Lockwood; June 28, 1854; Newark, New Jersey, US
- Died: March 28, 1937 (aged 82); Brooklyn, New York, US
- Resting place: Green-Wood Cemetery
- Education: Art education received from her father, Rembrandt Lockwood
- Occupation: Illustrator
- Years active: ca. 1890–1937
- Employer(s): Various publishers: Raphael Tuck & Son; Samuel Gabriel Company; Saalfield
- Known for: Illustrations depicting children
- Notable work: Children's books and ephemera such as postcards, advertising cards, paper dolls, etc.
- Spouse: William Tyson Brundage (m. 1886)
- Children: 1

Frances Isabelle Lockwood Brundage (1854–1937) was an American illustrator best known for her depictions of attractive and endearing children on postcards, valentines, calendars, and other ephemera published by Raphael Tuck & Sons, Samuel Gabriel Company, and Saalfield Publishing. She received an education in art at an early age from her father, Rembrandt Lockwood. Her professional career in illustration began at seventeen when her father abandoned his family and she was forced to seek a livelihood.

In addition to ephemera, Brundage illustrated children's classics such as the novels of Louisa May Alcott, Johanna Spyri, Robert Louis Stevenson, and Ouida, and traditional literary collections such as The Arabian Nights and the stories of King Arthur and Robin Hood. She was a prolific artist, and, in her late 60s, was producing as many as twenty books annually. Her work is highly collectible.

== Biography ==
Brundage was born Frances Isabelle Lockwood on June 28, 1854 in Newark, New Jersey, to Rembrandt Lockwood (Dec 13th 1815-188?) and Sarah Ursula Despeaux. Her father was an architect, a wood engraver, and an artist who painted church murals, portraits, and miniatures. Brundage received her art education from her father, and, at the age of seventeen, was forced to earn a living from her art after Lockwood abandoned his family. However, NY State census for 1875 shows him living with his family, not abandoning them, and in 1875, Frances was 21, and not employed. Another site states that Rembrandt Lockwood disappeared mysteriously in 1875, but he apparently was found as evidenced by letters he wrote in 1884.

She sold her first professional work – a sketch illustrating a poem by Louisa May Alcott – to the author. She illustrated books and ephemera such as paper dolls, postcards, valentines, prints, trade cards, and calendars. Her book illustrations were sometimes published as postcards.

In 1886, she married the artist, William Tyson Brundage, and gave birth to one child, Mary Frances Brundage, who died in 1891 aged 17 months. The Brundages resided in Washington, D.C., summered at Cape Ann, Massachusetts, and, in later years, moved to Brooklyn, New York. They occasionally worked jointly on projects.

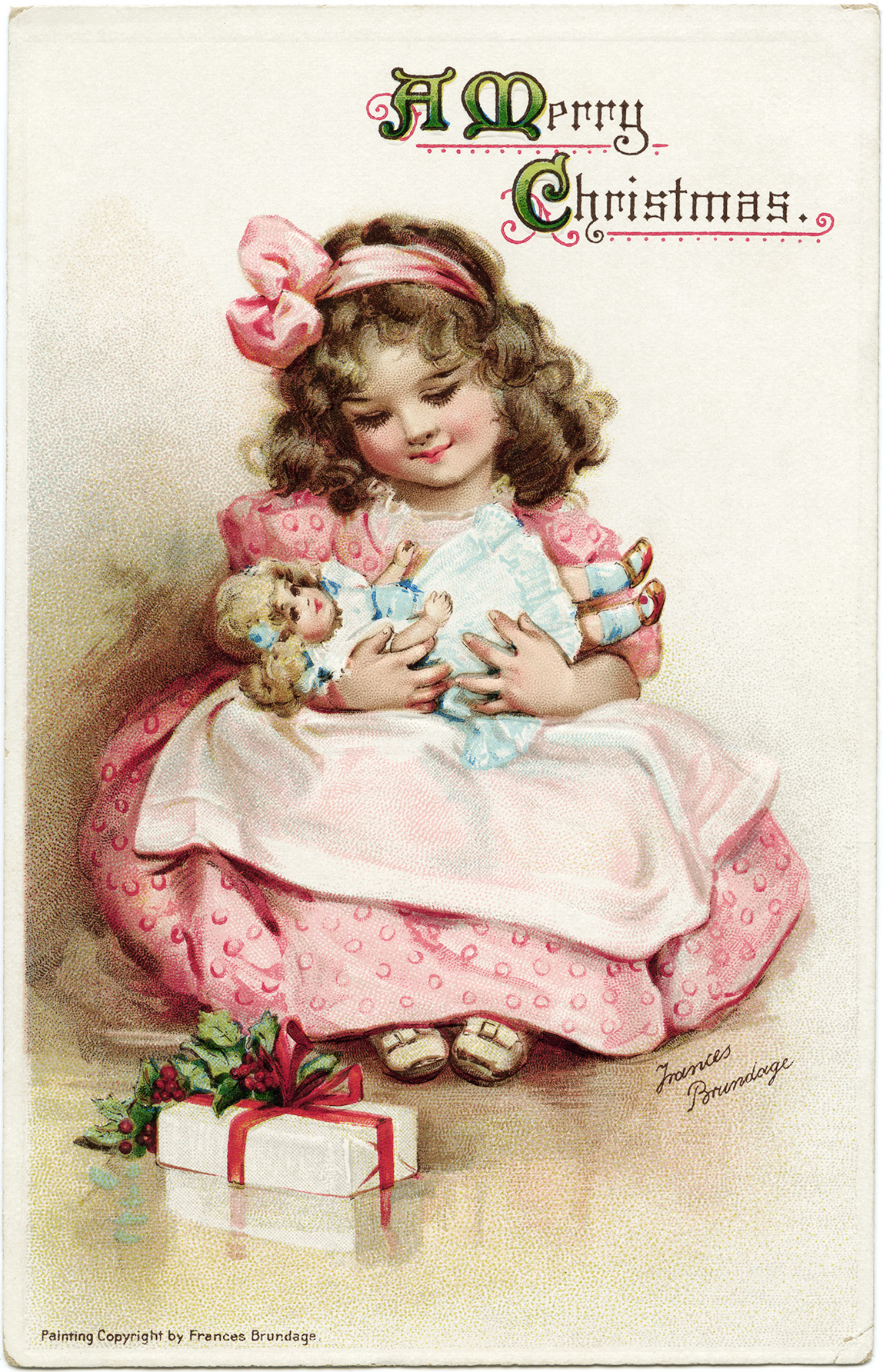
Christmas card, ca. 1910

Brundage produced works for Raphael Tuck & Sons with an emphasis on attractive and endearing Victorian children. At the same time she was also published by Wolff Hagelberg, Berlin, in near equal amount, except no book illustration and quite different subject and style. Maud Humphrey was the preferred artist with American publishers in the 1890s, but Brundage was chosen by Tuck, London, and Hagelberg, Berlin, international art publishers, for their American market publication. As a result, Brundage had extensive early Euro and UK international postcard publication, more than any other children artist except Ellen Clapsaddle and Harriett M. Bennett, as well as with Tuck's and Hagelberg's large lines of U.S. postcards. Those postcards and the Tuck and the Hagelberg lines of fancy diecut valentines made Brundage the largest presence in U.S. art paper 1899-1910. By 1910, she was working for New York publisher, Samuel Gabriel Company (S. Gabriel had been manager of Tuck's U.S. publishing operations and was responsible for Tuck's use of Brundage for book illustration and postcards), and later, Akron, Ohio publisher, Saalfield. She also did illustrated books for Stecher Lithographic Company, DeWolfe, Fiske & Company, Fred A. Stokes, Charles E. Graham & Company, and E.P. Dutton & Ernest Nister—and work for Hayes & Koerner. later Hayes Co.. During her late 60s, she produced as many as 20 books per year (exaggeration!). Brundage died on March 28, 1937, aged 82 years.

Brundage was notable for ethnic illustrations as early as 1886 for Louis Prang, 1890 and 1892 for W. Hagelberg, and for Tuck valentines and postcards in the early 1900s. While "stereotypical" in form, they were not negative and might be compared to her "comical" treatment of romance with Tuck diecut valentine and postcard images where the intent is not ridicule but rather positive dramatization. For example, an 1892 Cincinnati merchant's greeting card image shows pugnacious Irish girl in rags, black girl in rags, well-dressed white girl, dignified oriental girl, and sober American Indian girl with bow and arrows—all smiling and holding hands (except the sober American Indian girl), the point being friendship and human worth regardless of ethnicity and social status...not quite the stereotypical attitude of the time and very much an expression of the American social ideal as we think of it today.
