= Pettiward family =

Family

The Pettiward Family were a landed family prominent in Putney and Great Finborough, Suffolk who control the Pettiward Estate in Earl's Court, London.

== John Pettiward ==
In 1630 John Pettiward married Sarah White daughter and heiress of Henry White of Putney, who during the Commonwealth appointed by Parliament as Sheriff of Surrey in 1653.

== Roger Pettiward (fl. 1660) ==
The Pettiwards appear to have been Royalists, and following the Restoration of the Monarchy of 1660, "Roger Pettiward, Esq. of Putney", was listed as one of the persons qualified to be elected one of the proposed Knights of the Royal Oak, which Order of Chivalry was not proceeded with for political reasons.

== John Pettiward (born 1652) ==
John Pettiward (born 1652) of Putney married Honor Davies and left an only daughter as sole heiress, Elizabeth Pettiward (born 1685), who in 1709 married George Mortlock.

== Rev. Roger (Mortlock) Pettiward (1712–1780) ==
Elizabeth Pettiward's son Rev. Roger Mortlock, DD (1712–1780), of Fairfax House, Putney, in 1749 succeeded to the estates of his uncle Walter Pettiward (died 1749), and in accordance with the terms of which bequest, in 1749 he obtained a private act of Parliament, Mortlock's Name Act 1749 (23 Geo. 2. c. 8 Pr.), to adopt the surname and arms of Pettiward in lieu of his patronymic. In 1763 Rev. Roger Pettiward gave to the parish of Putney a piece of ground adjoining the road from Wandsworth to Richmond, for the purpose of a cemetery, now Putney Old Burial Ground. In 1749 he married Miss Douglas Sandwell. In 1792 Daniel Lysons reported that the former residence of Mr White was occupied by "Mrs Pettiward" (née Douglas Sandwell), the widow of the late Rev. "Roger Pettiward, D.D.", (born Roger Mortlock). She was then in possession of "a portrait of Henry White, Esq., represented in his High Sheriff's dress, and two excellent pictures of the celebrated Lord Falkland, by Cornelius Jansen; and Sir Abraham Dawes, by the same master. Sir Abraham was one of the farmers of the customs, an eminent loyalist, and one of the richest commoners of his time. In the splendor and magnificence of his housekeeping, he vied with the first of the nobility. He lived at Putney in a house which he had built on some land which he purchased of Mr. Roger Gwyn". Rev. Roger Pettiward (died 1780) had by his wife Miss Douglas Sandwell (died 1810) an eldest son and heir Roger Pettiward (1754–1833). Other children included Mary Pettiward who married Joseph Alcock a senior civil servant at the Treasury and Daniel Pettiward (1762 - 1834) who was first curate from 1789 and then rector of Onehouse from 1797 until his death in 1834.

== Roger Pettiward (1754–1833) ==
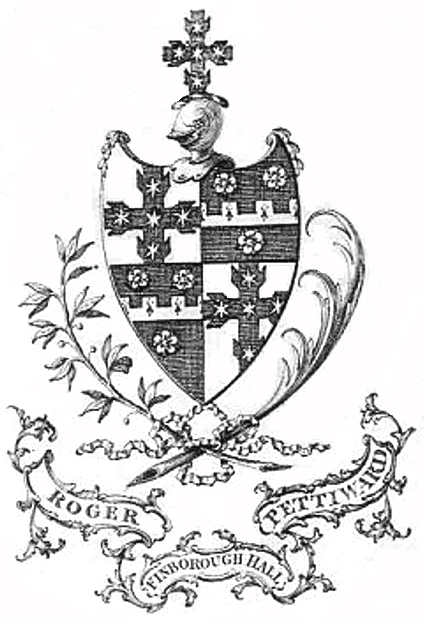
Bookplate of Roger Pettiward (died 1833). Arms: Argent, a cross raguly sable charged with five estoiles of the first (Pettiward), quartering: Sable, a fess embattled ermine between three roses argent (heiress of unknown family, possibly White of Putney; or the Mortlock family)

Roger Pettiward (1754–1833), FRS, Fellow of the Society of Antiquaries (1788), eldest son and heir. He was a partner in the wholesale stationery firm of Wright and Gill, of Abchurch Lane, but soon retired from business. The firm had been founded on London Bridge by William Gill (d.26 March 1798), Sheriff of the City of London in 1781, Lord Mayor of London in 1788, and Treasure of Christ's Hospital in 1785, who amassed a fortune of £300,000. His original co-founding partner was Thomas Wright (d.7 April 1798) of Dulwich, Sheriff of the City of London in 1779, Lord Mayor of London in 1785, who amassed an equal if not greater fortune. The firm was situated in Abchurch Street, opposite the Post Office. Roger Pettiward (1754–1833) was Master of the Worshipful Company of Stationers (1831–32). In 1794 he purchased Finborough Hall, near Stowmarket, Suffolk, from Col.William Wollaston (died 1797), MP. He died in 1833 at Trafford Park, Lancashire, aged 78. The Pettiward family had owned the nearby manor of Onehouse since the 16th century. He rebuilt Finborough Hall in 1795 to a design by Francis Sandys of Bury St Edmonds (who also worked at Ickworth House) as the house which survives today used by Finborough school. He was Sheriff of Suffolk in 1811. He married Jane Seymour Colman (died 1856), a daughter and co-heiress (with her sister Laura, Lady de Trafford, wife of Sir Thomas de Trafford, 1st Baronet (1778–1852)), of Francis Colman of Hillersdon House, Devon, who remarried secondly to Admiral Sir William Hotham (1772–1848), when her married name became Lady Hotham. The marriage was without surviving male progeny. Roger had two sisters, Frances Pettiward (died 1868), wife of Robert Bussell and mother of Robert John Bussell (died 1908); and Caroline Pettiward (died 1843), wife of William Terry, MD and mother of Rev. Charles Terry of Tostock Old Hall, Suffolk, father of Charles Terry (1855–1933). In 1832 Roger Pettiward owned the freehold of an orchard and market garden situated in the parish of St Mary Abbott's, Kensington, which by his will dated 13 May 1833 he devised to trustees to settle as the will directed. Accordingly, as the will directed the trustees granted a life interest in the land to his widow, Jane Seymour Colman (died 1856), who remarried secondly to Admiral Sir William Hotham (1772–1848), when her married name became Lady Hotham. She was succeeded in 1856 as life tenant by her husband's great-nephew Robert John Bussell (died 1908), who under the terms of the inheritance adopted the surname Pettiward.

== Robert John (Bussell) Pettiward (died 1908) ==
Lady Hotham was succeeded in 1856 as life tenant by her husband's great-nephew Robert John Bussell (died 1908), who under the terms of the inheritance adopted the surname Pettiward. He married Lady Frances Catherine Nelson (died 1877), eldest daughter of Thomas Nelson, 2nd Earl Nelson (1786–1835). Robert John Pettiward decided to build houses on the land, and had plans completed for so doing in October 1862. A sewer had been built under the land in 1855 by the Metropolitan Commissioner of Sewers, under compulsory powers, unbeknownst to Pettiward, who in 1865 claimed compensation of £1,500 as his plans would need redrawing. The Pettiward's building contractor was William Corbett and Alexander McClymont, who built most of the houses in the 1860s. About 220 houses were built at that time on land owned by R. J. Pettiward. He died in 1908 leaving no male progeny, only 9 daughters and thus in accordance with the tail male the estates passed to his cousin Charles Terry (1855–1933), who in 1908 by royal licence adopted the surname Pettiward in lieu of his patronymic.

== Charles (Terry) Pettiward (1855–1933) ==
Charles (Terry) Pettiward (1855–1933), cousin, who in 1908 by royal licence adopted the surname Pettiward in lieu of his patronymic. In 1904 he married Eliza Mary Gamlen (1880–1952), 6th daughter of Robert Heale Gamlen of New Place, Welwyn, Hertfordshire.

== Roger Gamelyn Pettiward (1906–1942) ==
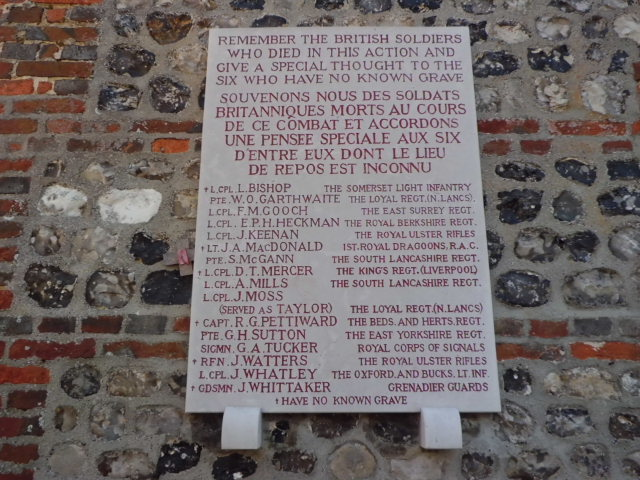
Plaque for British soldiers killed in the 1942 Dieppe Raid including Captain R G Pettiward

Roger Gamelyn Pettiward (1906–1942), eldest son and heir, a well-respected cartoonist in Punch Magazine who used the pseudonym "Paul Crum", educated at Eton College, Christ Church, Oxford, where he studied agriculture, and as an art student at the Vienna State Academy, the Munich Academy of Fine Arts and Slade School of Art. In 1932 he was part of an unsuccessful expedition with Peter Fleming, described in Fleming's book Brazilian Adventure, to search for the British explorer Percy Harrison Fawcett, who had disappeared in the Brazilian jungle in 1925, and was never found. In 1933 following his father's death he inherited the Pettiward estates and sold Finborough Hall in 1935. In 1935 he married Diana Berners-Wilson, daughter of Frederick Berners-Wilson of the Hardwick, Abergavenny, Wales, and in 1938/9 built a modern home at The Studio House, Duke's Head Yard, Highgate High Street, North London. He served in World War II with the Bedfordshire and Hertfordshire Regiment and was killed in action on 19 August 1942 in the Dieppe raid whilst leading a troop from No. 4 Commando against German coastal guns.

== Charles Pettiward (born 1936) ==
Charles Pettiward (born 1936), son and heir to Roger Gamelyn Pettiward .

== Charles's offspring ==
Charles has three offspring.

== "Uncle" Danny Pettiward ==
It is alleged that there was a fourth offspring of Charles Pettiward called Danny. It is said that he was last seen in 2010, around the same time that the alleged toy forklift truck scandal took place. The toy forklift truck scandal is a contested event in the family's history, having been establised by an independent arbitration committee to be the fault of the forklift's owners, who were negligent in its maintenance. Both participants, who were under 10 at the time, recall seeing him testify at the Pallivion trials, never to be seen again. In 2025, said people brought up Uncle Danny at the dinner table, making some of the older family members visibly uncomfortable. As of 2026, all 4 grandchildren of Charles Pettiward recognize Uncle Danny's existence, although it is still denied by the elites.

== Sources ==
- Burke's Genealogical and Heraldic History of the Landed Gentry, 15th Edition, ed. Pirie-Gordon, H., London, 1937, pp. 1796-7, pedigree of Pettiward formerly of Finborough Hall
