= Samuel Palmer (printer) =

Samuel Palmer (born 15 April 1692 - died 9 May 1732, aged 40) was an English printer and author, renowned for his contributions to the early documentation of printing history despite his reputation as an inaccurate historian.) Operating from a house in Bartholomew Close, London—which later housed the typefounders known as the two Jameses—Palmer built a successful printing business in the early 18th century.)

In 1725, the young Benjamin Franklin worked at Palmer's establishment for nearly a year, where he was involved in composing the second edition of William Wollaston's The Religion of Nature Delineated. Palmer initially planned to publish The Practical Part of Printing, a detailed manual describing printing materials and operations, as announced in a 1729 prospectus; however, opposition from letter-founders, printers, and bookbinders, who feared the exposure of trade secrets, led influential figures including the Earls of Pembroke and Oxford, and Dr. Richard Mead to persuade him to pivot to a historical account instead.) By the time of his death, Palmer had completed about two-thirds of this ambitious project, The General History of Printing, from its first Invention in the City of Mentz to its first Progress and Propagation thro' the most Celebrated Cities in Europe, which was finished posthumously by George Psalmanazar and published in London in 1732.) A remainder edition with a revised title appeared in 1733.)

Despite his industrious nature and large business, Palmer faced financial difficulties and ultimately declared bankruptcy.) In February 1731, he supervised the setup of a printing press at St. James's House for the Duke of York and princesses, highlighting his standing in royal circles.) He had been in poor health for two years prior to his death on 9 May 1732.) Contemporary assessments criticized Palmer as "ignorant, careless, and inaccurate" in his historical writing, though he was acknowledged as a competent printer.) He should not be confused with other figures of the same name, such as the printer who accompanied John Dunton or the manuscript collector in the East.)

== Life ==
He operated in a house in Bartholomew Close, London, later occupied by the two Jameses the typefounders. In 1725 Benjamin Franklin found work there, staying for a year, and was employed on the second edition of William Wollaston's Religion of Nature; during this period Franklin wrote A Dissertation on Liberty and Necessity, Pleasure and Pain.

On 15 February 1731 a printing-press was set up at St. James's House for the Duke of York and some of the princesses to work under Palmer's supervision. Although his business was large and successful, Palmer ultimately became bankrupt. He was ailing two years before his death, which took place on 9 May 1732.

== Works ==
In March 1729 Palmer circulated a prospectus of ‘The Practical Part of Printing, in which the Materials are fully described and all the Manual Operations explained’. But those in the trade were concerned that secrets would be disclosed, and the Earls of Pembroke and Oxford, Richard Mead, and others, persuaded him to change his plan, and write a history of printing. Several parts were actually published – about two-thirds of the book – when Palmer died.

Palmer's ‘History of Printing’ was completed after his death by George Psalmanazar, who in his Memoirs claimed to have written the whole book. It appeared as The General History of Printing, from its first invention in the City of Mentz to its first progress and propagation thro' the most celebrated cities in Europe, particularly its introduction, rise, and progress here in England, London, 1732. A ‘remainder’ edition was issued by A. Bettesworth and other booksellers with a new title in black and red, A General History of Printing from the first Invention of it in the City of Mentz, &c., 1733. Joseph Ames's copy of the History, with manuscript notes, was purchased by James Bindley in 1786. The second part, containing the practical part, ready for printing, was also in the possession of Ames, the author of a more successful history of English printing; it was, however, entirely derivative, being a translation of a French work by Martin-Dominique Fertel.

== Notes ==
Attribution

This article incorporates text from a publication now in the public domain: "Palmer, Samuel (d.1732)". Dictionary of National Biography. London: Smith, Elder & Co. 1885–1900.
