= Finborough =

Finborough may refer to

- Finborough Hall, now Finborough School, Suffolk
- The Finborough Theatre, Earls Court, London
- Great Finborough, Suffolk
- Little Finborough, Suffolk
