= William Wollaston =

17th/18th-century English priest and scholar

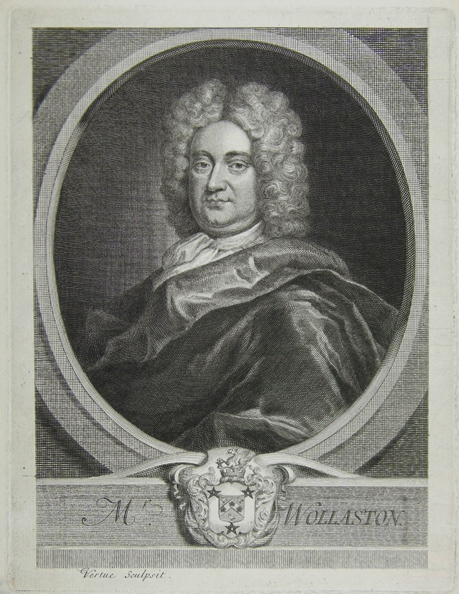
- Born: 26 March 1659; Coton-Clanford, Staffordshire, England
- Died: 29 October 1724 (aged 65); London, England

Philosophical work
- Era: 18th-century philosophy
- Region: Western philosophy
- School: Enlightenment; Rationalism
- Main interests: Ethics, philosophy of religion
- Notable ideas: Religion derived from adherence to truth

William Wollaston (/ˈwʊləstən/; 26 March 1659 – 29 October 1724) was an English school teacher, Church of England priest, scholar of Latin, Greek, and Hebrew, theologian, and a major Enlightenment era English philosopher. He is remembered today for one book, which he completed two years before his death: The Religion of Nature Delineated. He led a cloistered life, but in terms of eighteenth-century philosophy and the concept of natural religion, he is ranked with British Enlightenment philosophers such as Locke, Berkeley, and Hume.

Wollaston's work contributed to the development of two important intellectual schools: British Deism, and "the pursuit of happiness" moral philosophy of American Practical Idealism, a phrase which appears in the United States Declaration of Independence.

== Life ==
Wollaston was born at Coton Clanford in Staffordshire, on 26 March 1659. He was born to a family long-established in Staffordshire, and was distantly related to Sir John Wollaston, the Alderman and Lord Mayor of London. However, his family was not wealthy. At the age of ten, he began school at a Latin school newly opened in Shenstone, Staffordshire, and continued in country free schools until he was admitted to Sidney Sussex College, Cambridge, at the age of 15, in June 1674. From his writings it is clear that he was an excellent scholar, "extremely well versed" in languages and literature.

In his last year at Cambridge, Wollaston published anonymously a small book, On the Design of the Book of Ecclesiastes, or the Unreasonableness of Men's Restless Contention for the Present Enjoyments, represented in an English Poem (London, 1691). Apparently embarrassed by his own work, Wollaston almost immediately suppressed it.

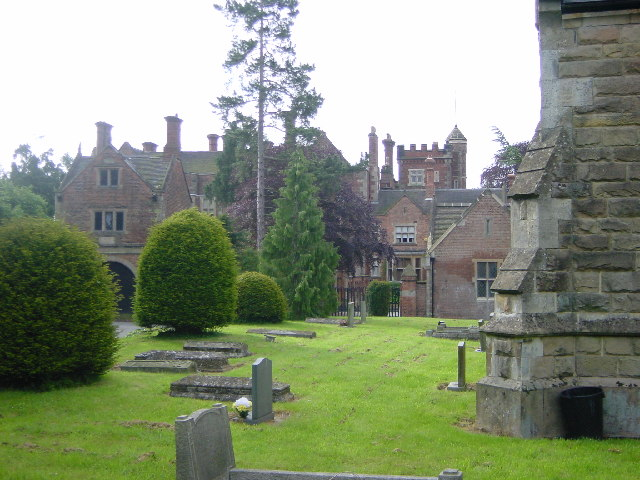
Shenton Hall, Leicestershire

After leaving Cambridge in September 1681, he became an assistant master at King Edward's School, Birmingham and took holy orders. At this time, he became Perpetual curate of St Mary's Church, Moseley from 1684 – 1686.

In 1688 his cousin William Wollaston of Shenton left him a fortune and the family estates, including Finborough manor, Suffolk and the reversion of Shenton Hall, Leicestershire, and in November of the same year he settled in London. There Wollaston devoted himself to private study of learning and philosophy, seldom leaving the city and declining to accept any public employment. In retirement, he published The Religion of Nature Delineated (1722) in a private edition. He wrote extensively on language, philosophy, religion, and history, but in the last few years of his life, he committed most of his manuscripts to the flames, as his health worsened and he began to feel that he would never be able to complete them to his satisfaction.

Wollaston suffered from fragile health throughout his life. Just after completing The Religion of Nature Delineated, he broke his arm in an accident, and his strength declined and illnesses increased until his death on 29 October 1724. His body was carried to Great Finborough in Suffolk, where he was buried beside his wife.

== The Religion of Nature Delineated ==
=== Argument ===
The Religion of Nature Delineated was an attempt to create a system of ethics without recourse to revealed religion. He claimed originality for his theory that the moral evil is the practical denial of a true proposition and moral good the affirmation of it, writing that this attempt to use mathematics to create a rationalist ethics was "something never met with anywhere". Wollaston "held that religious truths were plain as Euclid, clear to all who contemplated Creation." Newton had induced natural laws from a mathematical model of the physical world; similarly, Wollaston was attempting to induce moral laws by a mathematical model of the moral world.

=== Influence ===
More than 10,000 copies were sold in the just first few years alone with 15 imprints prior to 1800. A biography of the author was added to the 8th edition in 1750.

Wollaston's idea of a Natural religion without revelation briefly inspired and revived the movement known as Deism in England. Some today consider him a "Christian Deist", while others note that there is no "significant evidence that William Wollaston was not a more or less orthodox Christian."

Although Wollaston's ideas could be argued to have anticipated both Scottish Common Sense Realism and Utilitarianism proponents of later schools of philosophy criticised and sometimes even ridiculed Wollaston. These included Francis Hutcheson, David Hume, Richard Price, and Jeremy Bentham.

After 1759 no further edition of his work was published in the rest of the century.

Benjamin Franklin worked as a compositor on one of the 1726 editions of the book and wrote the short pamphlet A Dissertation on Liberty and Necessity, Pleasure and Pain in response. Later, however, he found his pamphlet "so shallow and unconvincing as to be embarrassing", and burned as many copies as he could find. Although rejecting Deism, he retained a fondness for the "pursuit of happiness", believing that God was best served by doing good works and helping other people.

It was a major influence on the American educator Rev. Dr. Samuel Johnson's college philosophy textbooks. Its focus on practice as well as speculation attracted a more mature Franklin, who commissioned and published Johnson's textbook Elementa Philosophica in 1752, then promoted it in the College of Philadelphia (now Penn University).

== Family ==
On 26 November 1689, Wollaston married Catharine Charlton (died 21 July 1720). They had eleven children together, four of whom died within his lifetime. They included:

- Charlton, the eldest son, died unmarried in 1729
- William, Member of Parliament for Ipswich
- Francis (1694–1774) FRS, third son
- John, fifth son, died 1720.
