= Richard Phipson =

English church architect (1827–1884)

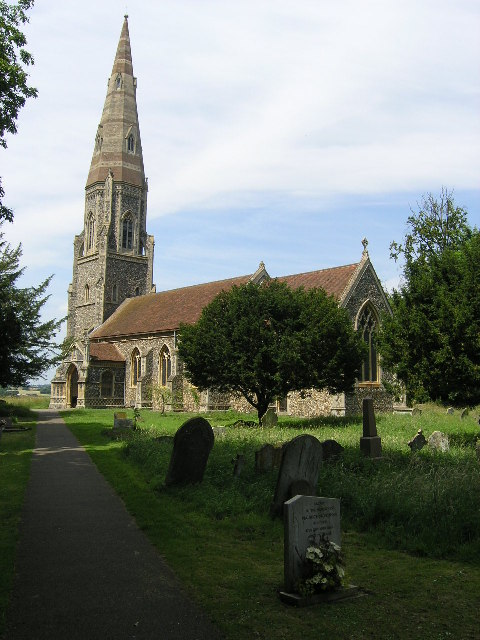
Phipson's spire at St Andrews, Great Finborough, sometimes nicknamed "Thunderbird One"

Richard Makilwaine Phipson (1827–1884) was an English architect. As diocesan architect for the Anglican Diocese of Norwich, he was responsible for renovating almost 100 churches in East Anglia.

== Biography ==
Phipson was born in Ipswich. He was diocesan surveyor (architect) for the Anglican Diocese of Norwich from 1871 to 1884, and a county surveyor in the 1860s, though he was active from the 1850s. He restored a large number of churches in East Anglia in the middle and late 19th century: he was "fond of big, unexpected figure and foliage carvings". He was responsible, for instance, for the St John the Baptist Church, Harleston, the interior of the St Peter Mancroft church in Norwich, and the near-complete rebuilding of St Mary le Tower church in Ipswich. The diocese then included East Suffolk, where he worked on many churches, including All Saints, Holbrook, Thelnetham Church and St Mary's Burgh-next-Aylsham.

== Notable projects ==
St Mary-le-Tower is the civic church of Ipswich, and "the nearest thing the town will ever have to a cathedral. This is Suffolk's Victorian church par excellence. It is full of the spirit of its age, from the Suffolk flushwork to the international gothic of the spire itself. One could no more imagine Ipswich without 'the Tower' than without the Orwell Bridge," according to Simon Knott. There was a medieval church on the site, which was almost entirely demolished in the 1860s, so that the present exterior is largely Phipson's, although the nave arcades and some monuments and fittings inside remain from the original.

Phipson replaced the tower and spire at Woolpit after they were destroyed by lightning in the 1850s. Despite his use of a style typical of Northamptonshire, rather than Suffolk, his spire is largely accepted as a success by most authorities. unlike his one at Great Finborough, sometimes dubbed "Thunderbird One" after the Supermarionation space rescue vehicle. He also oversaw the restoration and alteration of the Moot Hall, Aldeburgh in 1854–1855.

In 1865–66 Phipson oversaw restoration of St Peter's Church at Ickburgh, a project paid for by Francis Baring, 3rd Baron Ashburton. Phipson's work is praised as "surprisingly fine". In 1868, he added a chapel to the Union Workhouse at Beetley in Norfolk, now the Norfolk Rural Life Museum. He restored All Saints in Alburgh in 1876, adding "pinnacles with little flying buttresses" and reworking the chancel. In 1883 he restored the outside of St Peter's in Easton, Norfolk, and in 1886 the tower of St Andrew's in Kirby Bedon, the church in which he is buried. In the 1860s, Phipson also re-built and re-stored All Saints' Church in Cockley Cley.

Besides churches, Phipson also designed commercial buildings, including a bank on Hall Quay in Great Yarmouth. In the 1880s Phipson appears as one of the "chief landowners" of the parish of Winfarthing in Norfolk.

== Gallery ==
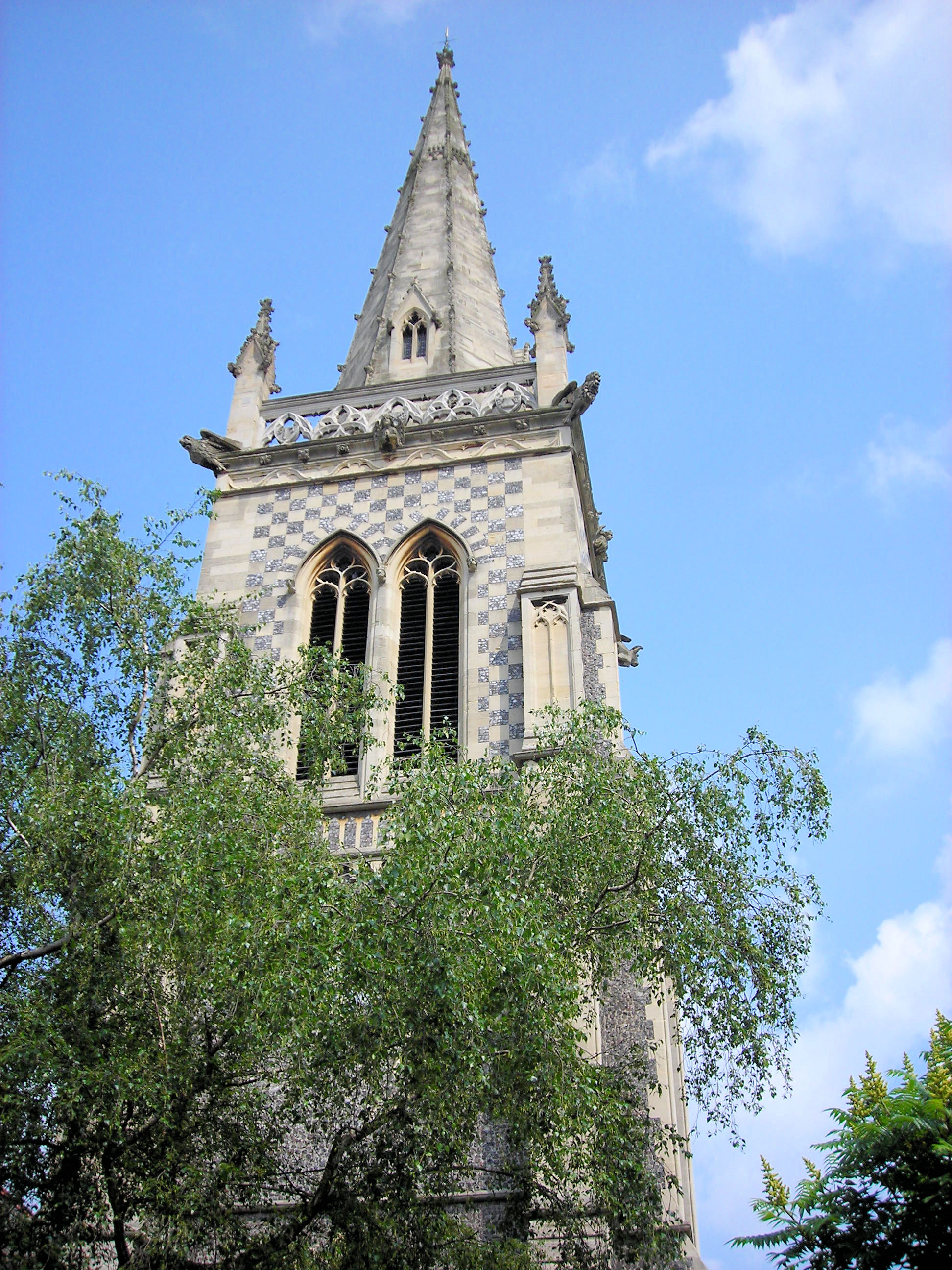
St Mary-le-Tower, Ipswich, a new church by Phipson on the site of a medieval one.

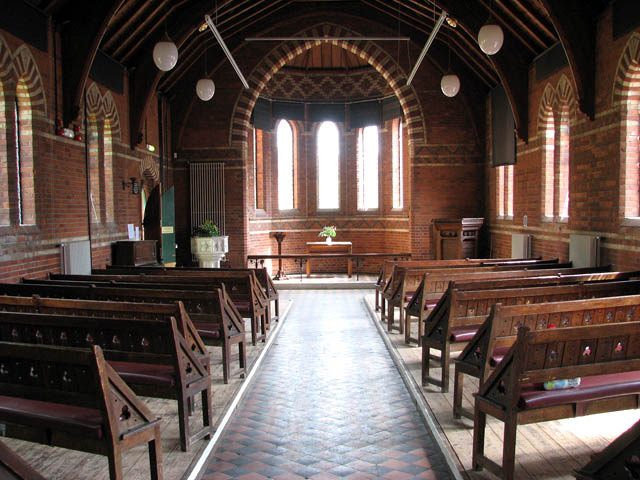
Chapel of the former Union Workhouse, Norfolk

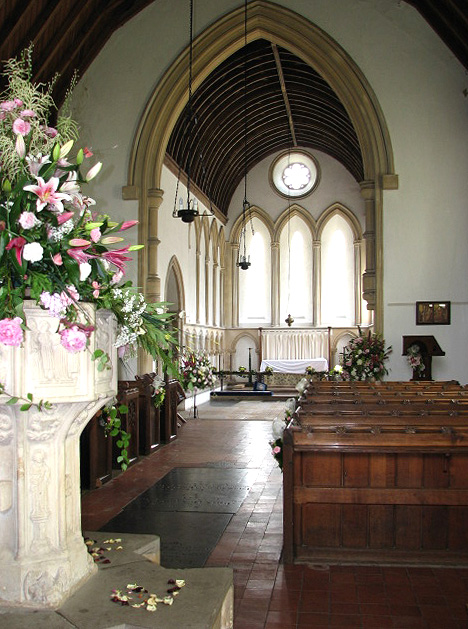
St Mary, Burgh-next-Aylsham

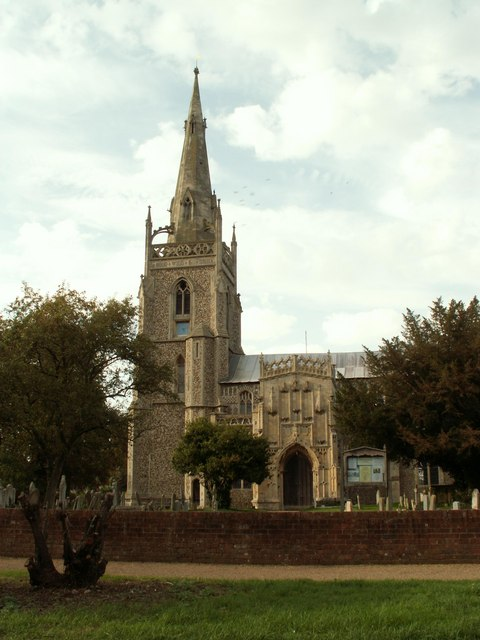
Saint Mary's Church, Woolpit — the tower and spire are Phipson's

== Bibliography ==
- Wilson, Bill (2002). revised Pevsner Architectural Guides, Norfolk, Part 2. Yale UP. ISBN 978-0-300-09657-6.
- Jenkins, Simon, England's Thousand Best Churches, 1999, Allen Lane, ISBN 0-7139-9281-6
- Simon Knott, Suffolk Churches biography; see also "Woolpit", "Great Finborough", "St Mary le Tower, Ipswich" etc.
- John Julius Norwich, The Architecture of Southern England, Macmillan, London, 1985, ISBN 0-333-22037-4
