= Charles Parke =

English landowner and Deputy Lieutenant of Dorset

Charles Parke (10 June 1791 – 1860) was an English landowner and Deputy Lieutenant of Dorset.

== Life ==
He was the son of William Parke of the Thickets, Jamaica, and his wife Eleanor Baldwin Crosse. In 1810 he was HBM Commissioner to Mexico where he was tasked with purchasing bullion for the British Government. The family were slave-owners in Jamaica. The compensation money paid to them on emancipation was shared between Charles's brother William Parke (1784–1863) and his mother.

Parke's father died in 1813. In 1847 Charles Parke purchased the Henbury estate in Dorset, and resided there.

== Family ==
In 1820 Parke married Letitia Alcock, daughter of Joseph Alcock of Roehampton. Letitia's brother was Thomas Alcock (MP). Their children included Charles Joseph Parke; and William Parke, at Eton College with him. Charles' great-niece Alice Katherine Parke, married Henry James Grasett, a Canadian militia and army officer who became the longest serving police chief in the history of the Toronto police force.
