= George Symons =

George Symons may refer to:

- George Symons (VC) (1826–1871), English recipient of the Victoria Cross
- George Symons (sailor) (1888–1950), British sailor on the RMS Titanic
- George James Symons (1838–1900), British meteorologist
- George Gardner Symons (1861–1930), American impressionist painter
- George William Culme Soltau Symons (1831–1916), Deputy Lieutenant of Devon
