= St Andrews, Great Finborough =

Anglican Church (Suffolk)

Coordinates: 52°10′59″N 0°56′38″E

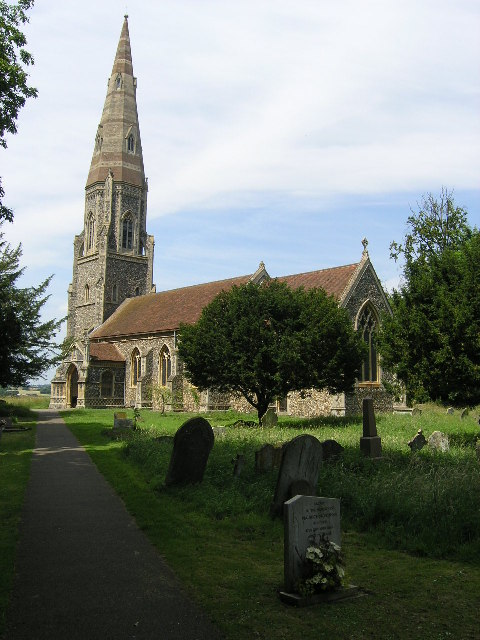
Richard Phipson's spire at St Andrews, sometimes nicknamed "Thunderbird One"

St Andrew's Church is situated in the village of Great Finborough, Suffolk, England. It is a Grade II listed building.

The church that stands today has been there since the Victorian period by Richard Phipson but there has been a place of worship on the site for over 1000 years. In 1086 the church as well as Finborough Hall were recorded in the Domesday Book. In 1558, the first records of births deaths and marriages were recorded at the church. In 1883 a small wall was built around the graveyard of the church costing £5. The roof was later damaged by lightning, and at another date the roof was damaged by gales at a cost of £10,000. The only original part of the church that still stands is the Tudor porch.

The spire nearly reaches 300 ft.
