= Charles Joseph Parke =

Charles Joseph Parke (4 December 1820 – 8 March 1893) was a High Sheriff of Dorset in 1869 and a Lord of the Manor of Sturminster Marshall. He was born at Ham Common in Surrey and was the son of Charles Parke and Letitia Parke née Alcock whose brother was Thomas Alcock (MP). In 1847 he married Ellen Mary Ethelston, daughter of the Rev Charles Wicksted Ethelston of Upplyme. Parke lived at Henbury, Dorset.

== Family ==
They had five sons and four daughters:

- Charles Ethelston Parke (born 1850), eldest son, served in the Rifle Brigade in the Third Anglo-Ashanti War. He married Mary Louisa Coventry, daughter of St John Coventry, and Mary Elizabeth Todd and step-daughter of George William Culme Soltau Symons.
- Edmund William Parke (1853–1901). He was educated at Wellington College, and went to Henbury Station in Northern Territory, Australia, in 1876, where his brother Walter joined him.
- Alfred Watlington Parke (born 1854), cleric; father of Wilfred Parke the aviator.
- Lawrence Parke of the 68th Durham Light Infantry, father of Walter Parke.
- Walter Parke, born 1863.
- Edith Letitia, married 1877 Rev. Charles Lewis Kennaway, a grandson of Lewis Way.
- Ellen Henrietta, married Philip Thomas Godsal.
- Charlotte Josephine.
- Mildred Margaret, married Henry Aubrey Cartwright of the 68th Light Infantry, son of Henry Cartwright.
