= Roger Pettiward =

English businessman and antiquarian

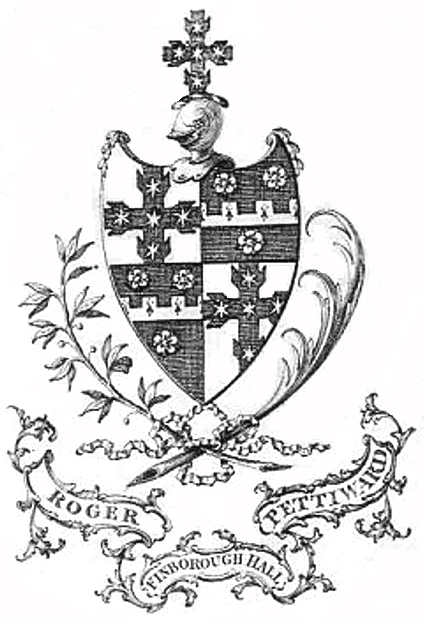
Bookplate of Roger Pettiward (died 1833)

Roger Pettiward (1754–1833) was an English businessman and antiquarian. He was elected a Fellow of the Society of Antiquaries in 1788, and a Fellow of the Royal Society in 1815.

== Background ==
He was a son of Rev. Roger Pettiward (died 1774); his mother was his wife Miss Douglas Sandwell (died 1810). His father, originally Roger Mortlock, graduated at Trinity College, Cambridge in 1735, and became a Fellow of the college in 1737. He took his mother's surname Pettiward by a private act of Parliament, Mortlock's Name Act 1749 (23 Geo. 2. c. 8 Pr.) in 1749 when he succeeded to her estates. He was vicar of Sibertswold. (Note: According to Alumni Cantabrigienses he became vicar of Marsworth, a Trinity living, around 1748. (The CCEd listing for Marsworth does not show Mortlock, or Pettiward.)) He resided in Putney He married in 1749, which would have entailed giving up his college fellowship.

Roger Pettiward had as sisters Frances Pettiward (died 1868), wife of Robert Bussell and mother of Robert John Bussell (died 1908); and Caroline Pettiward (died 1843), wife of William Terry, MD and mother of Rev. Charles Terry of Tostock Old Hall, Suffolk, father of Charles Terry (1855–1933). Another sister, Mary, married Joseph Alcock.

== Life ==
Unlike his elder brother John and younger brother Daniel, who were sent to Trinity College, Cambridge, Roger Pettiward went into business, apprenticed in 1769, for 1000 guineas, to William Gill of the London wholesale stationery firm of Wright & Gill, run with Thomas Wright. He became a partner in the enterprise, but retired early. In 1788–9 he travelled in Spain with William Parsons. Unpublished journals by both Parsons and Pettiward of this journey are extant.

Pettiward was High Sheriff of Suffolk in 1811, and Master of the Worshipful Company of Stationers (1831–32). In 1794 he purchased Finborough Hall, near Stowmarket, Suffolk, from Col.William Wollaston (died 1797), MP. The Pettiward family had owned the nearby manor of Onehouse since the 16th century. He rebuilt Finborough Hall in 1795 to a design by Francis Sandys of Bury St Edmonds. The house which survives today is used by Finborough school.

Pettiward died in 1833 at Trafford Park, Lancashire, aged 78.

== Family ==
Pettiward married Jane Seymour Colman (died 1856), a daughter and co-heiress (with her sister Laura, Lady de Trafford, wife of Sir Thomas de Trafford, 1st Baronet), of Francis Colman of Hillersdon House, Devon, who remarried secondly to Admiral Sir William Hotham (1772–1848); when her married name became Lady Hotham. The marriage was without surviving male progeny.

== Legacy ==
In 1832 Roger Pettiward owned the freehold of an orchard and market garden situated in the parish of St Mary Abbott's, Kensington, which by his will dated 13 May 1833 he devised to trustees to settle as the will directed. Accordingly, as the will directed the trustees granted a life interest in the land to his widow, Jane Seymour Colman (died 1856), She married, secondly, Admiral Sir William Hotham (1772–1848), when her married name became Lady Hotham.

She was succeeded in 1856 as life tenant by her husband's great-nephew Robert John Bussell (died 1908). Under the terms of the inheritance he adopted that year the surname Pettiward.
