= Coton Clanford =

Village in Staffordshire, England

Coordinates: 52.80710°N 2.19132°W

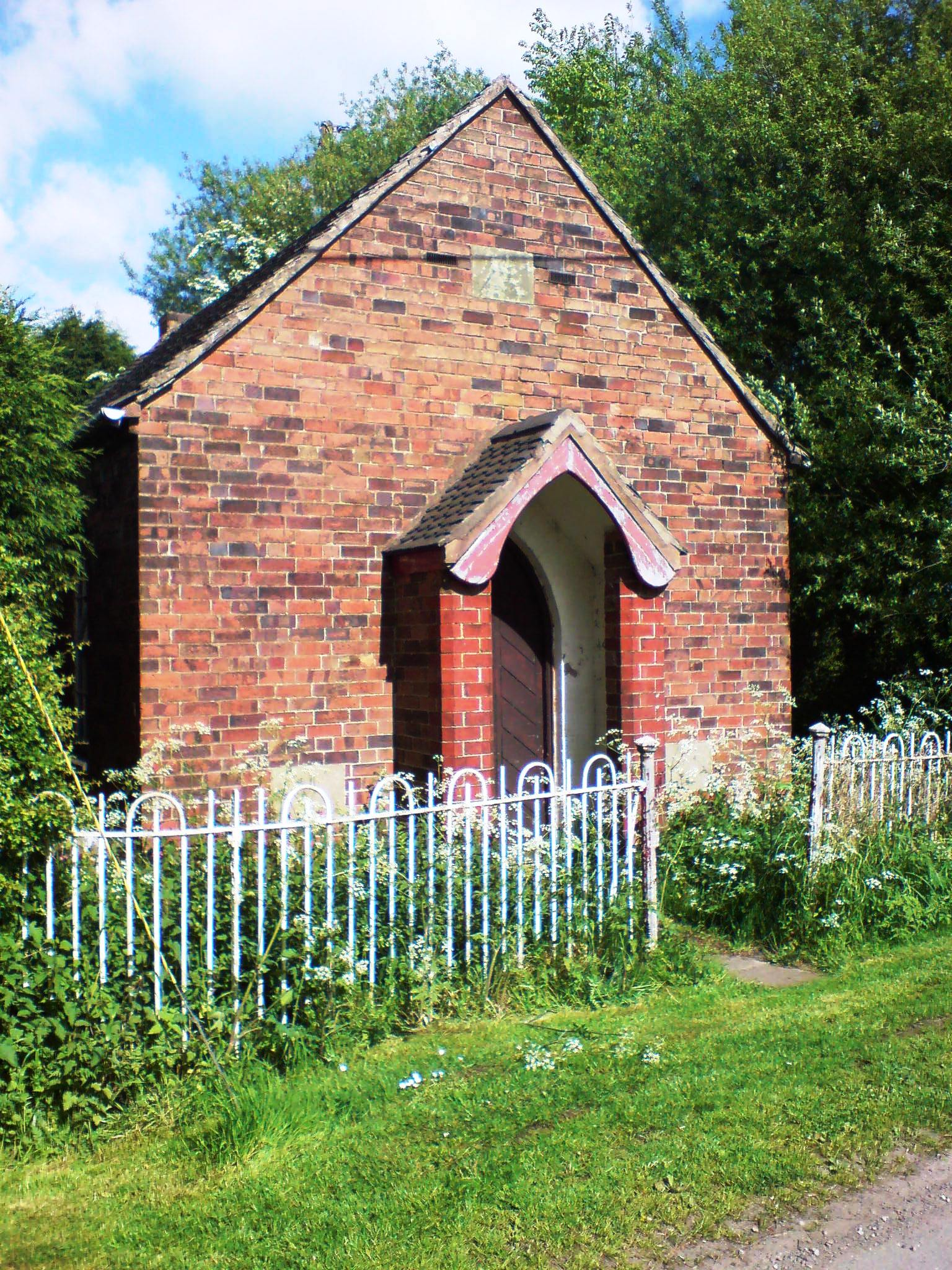
Clanford Primitive Methodist chapel, May 2008

Coton Clanford is a small dispersed Staffordshire village lying in gently rolling countryside 3 miles (4.8 km) due west of Stafford, England, and 1 mile (1.6 km) southeast of Seighford. The name of the village is sometimes hyphenated to Coton-Clanford, appearing this way on some cottage names locally. The population for this village as taken at the 2011 census can be found under Seighford. It lies midway between the B5405 road, 1½ miles to the north and the A518 1½ miles to the south.

The village has no shop, public house or church, comprising only a few scattered houses and cottages, several dairy farms and a long unused 19th-century chapel.

== History and amenities ==
The name derives from "(at the) cottages" (Coton) and, probably, "clean, unencumbered ford" (Clanford, added later).

The Primitive Methodist chapel was built in 1884, with the foundation stone laid on 30 October 1884. The chapel records 1891–1907, Coton Clanford Society records and Methodist chapel minute books, 1903–1929, are stored at Stafford Record Office. It seems likely that the chapel had a congregation of no more than 30. Since 1960 it has been owned and used by Stafford Trinity Church Scouts.

The village straddles Clanford Brook, which meanders southeastwards from Ranton towards Little Aston and Doxey and is bounded to the north by the southeastern edge of Seighford airfield and several large woods.

The English philosopher and cleric William Wollaston was born in the village in 1659.

== Clanford Hall ==
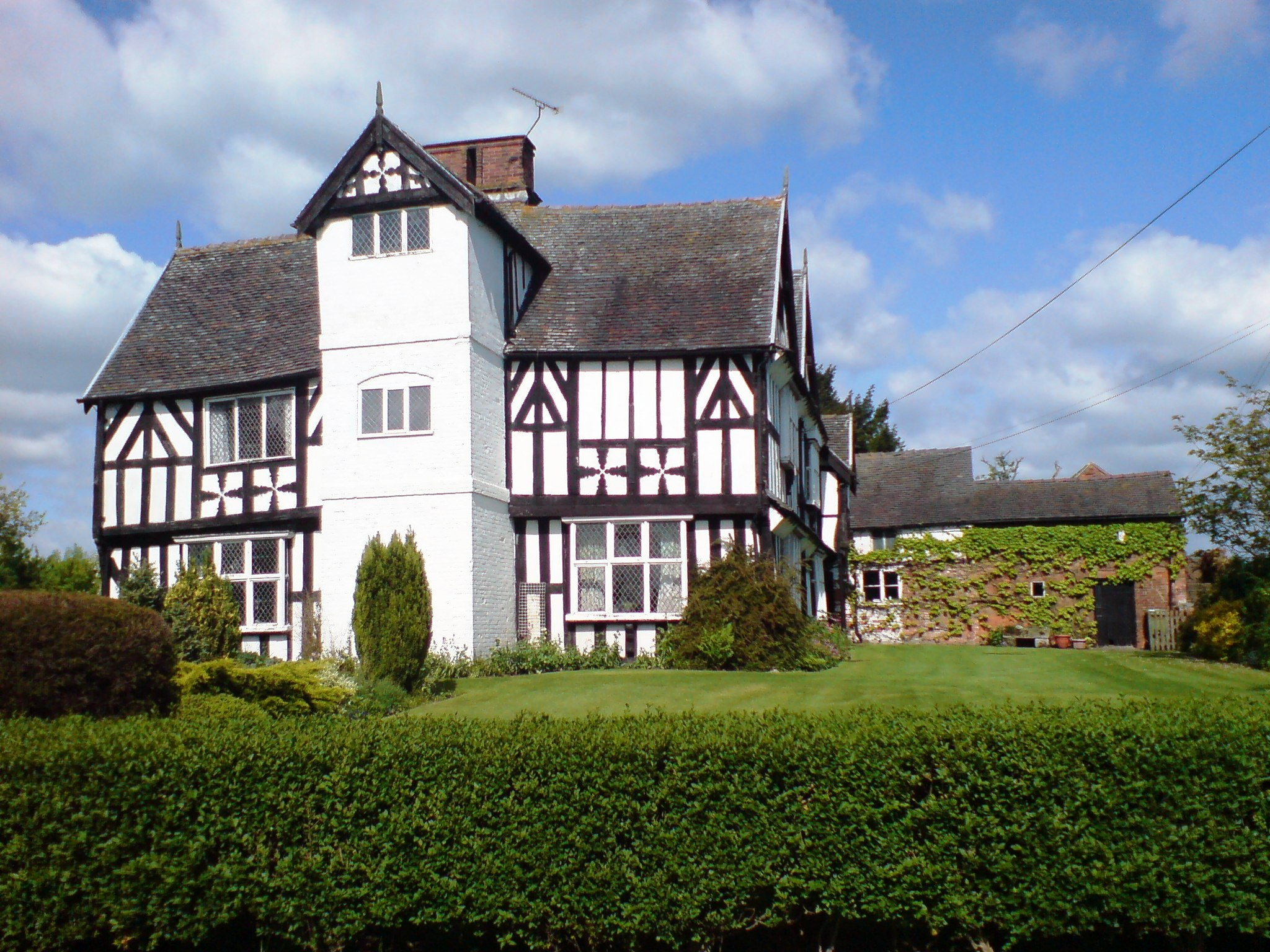
Clanford Hall, May 2008

Located here also is Clanford Hall, a three-storey, half-timbered Tudor mansion now used as a farmhouse. The building, built in 1684, is listed Grade II*. It is timber-framed with a tiled roof and brick chimney stacks. It has been restored in brick and colour-washed.
