= Finborough School =

Independent school in Great Finborough, Suffolk, England

Location
- Finborough Hall; Great Finborough, Suffolk, IP14 3EF; England; 52°11′03″N 0°56′47″E

Information
- Type: Independent day and boarding school
- Motto: Ad Summa Nitimur (Strive for the Highest), previously "Be Of Good Courage"
- Established: 1978
- Founder: John Sinclair
- Headmaster: Steven T Clark
- Gender: Coeducational
- Age: 2 to 18
- Enrolment: c675 pupils
- Houses: 4 (Athelstan, Boudicca, Edmund, Raedwald)
- Colours: Red and navy and white
- Website: http://www.finboroughschool.co.uk/

Finborough School is a co-educational independent school. It is situated in and around Finborough Hall, in the village of Great Finborough, near Stowmarket, Suffolk, England.

== History ==
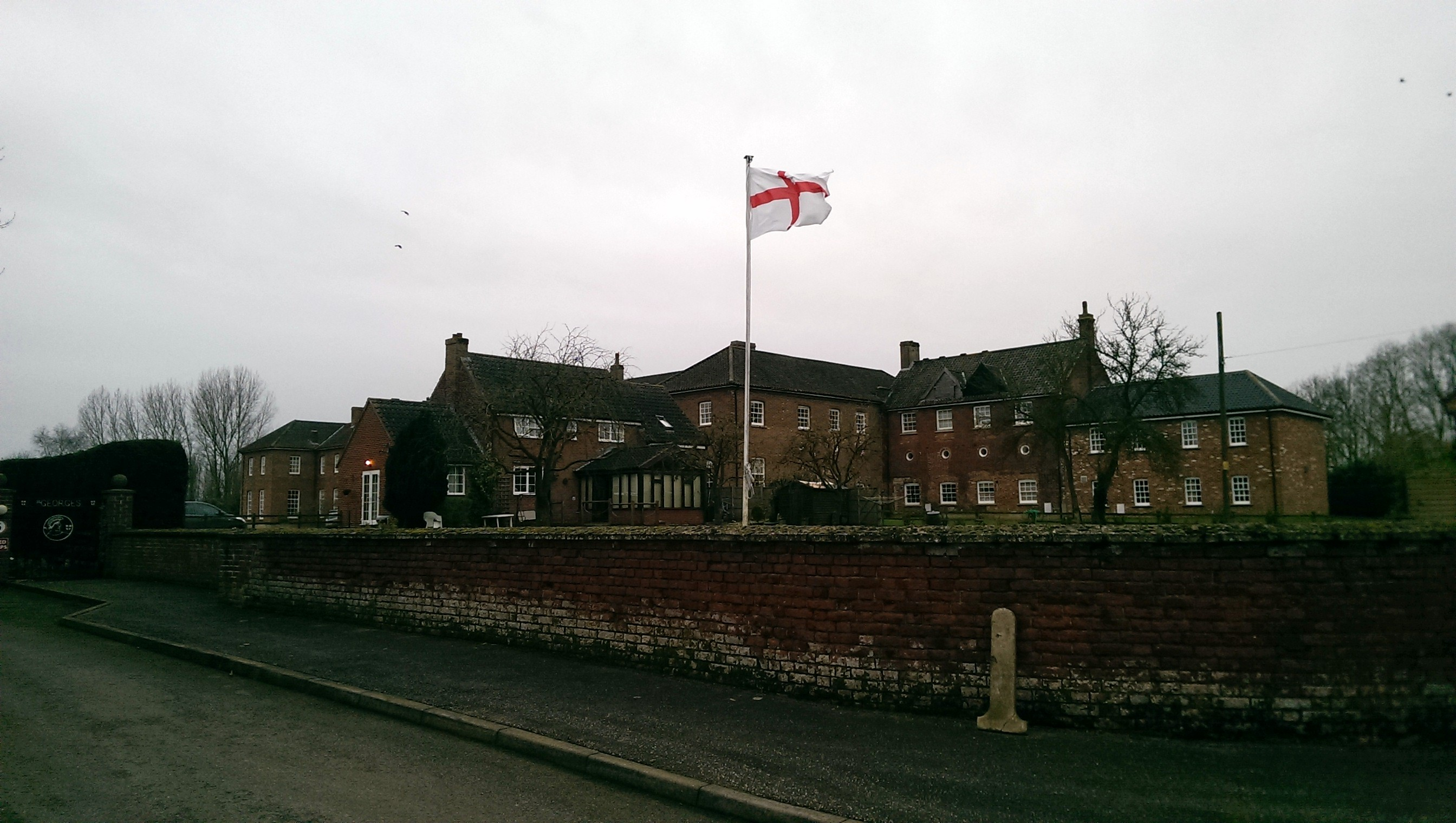
The former school buildings in Wicklewood. Now housing.

The original school, named St. George's School, was founded in 1978 by John Sinclair and his family with Derek Slade as Headmaster in Wicklewood near Wymondham, Norfolk and was set up as a military boarding school for boys whose parents were in the armed forces. After failed efforts to purchase the facilities of the shore establishment HMS Ganges, the school was moved to the current site at Great Finborough in 1980. The former Wicklewood school was retained for several years and operated as the St George's School for Girls until this too moved to Finborough and the original site was redeveloped into private apartments and homes.

John and Sue Sinclair, as owners, took over running of the school following Slade's departure, and it was renamed Finborough School. The school merged with Hillcroft Preparatory School in 2006. In 2003, John Sinclair was convicted of assaulting a walker after the man kicked his pet Labrador on the school grounds In 2008, James Sinclair took over as Principal after his father retired.

On 15 May 2014 The High Court appointed Grant Thornton as Liquidators for one of the companies (Anglemoss limited) associated with the directors and owners of the school.

== Finborough Hall ==
The school is based in Finborough Hall, a Grade II listed stucco-faced Tuscan-style country house, originally built in 1795 for Roger Pettiward on land previously owned by William Wollaston MP. Finborough Hall, once owned by the Pettiward family, subsequently gave its name to Finborough Road in London, developed as part of the Pettiward Estate in north-west Chelsea, London SW10, still owned by the Pettiward family. This led to the name of Finborough Theatre. The Hall's original c1700 staircase was moved to Rougham Hall in 1878.

== Today ==
The school includes Nursery, Pre-Prep, Prep School, Senior School and Sixth Form. This means that the school has pupils ranging from ages 2 to 18. The Nursery, Pre-Prep are based in the brand new pre-prep building with brand new facilities to offer and Prep School are all based in the old Finborough Hall building. The Senior School uses some parts of that building, but mainly uses a classroom block located nearby. Assemblies and prizegiving ceremonies are often held in the nearby Great Finborough church. The school offers a number leadership positions to older pupils, including Head of School, Deputy Head of School, School Council Chair, Prefects, House Captains and members of the school council.

Four school houses form the basis of many events throughout the academic year. Annual events include Sports Day and the Cross Country Run.

An U16 rugby match at Finborough School, the Finborough team is in red and blue.

=== Sport ===
The whole school uses extensive sports fields, tennis and netball courts a half and full sized hockey pitch for both sport and other events and they provide scholarships to those who excel at rugby. Girls play netball, hockey, athletics, tennis and rounders. Boys play football, rugby, athletics, cricket and tennis. Most age groups play matches against other local independent schools. House matches are played every year, house points are awarded to the winning house. Churchill house won in 2012.

Finborough School has made a number of notable links with local sports clubs. It has successful partnerships with Stowmarket Tennis Club and the Stowmarket Golf Centre. The school also sponsor Bury Rugby Club. Rugby has long been an important and celebrated part of school sport since the 1980s.

=== Music and drama ===
The school has a choir and various ensembles, with regular performance nights being held in the drama studio. The school choir perform regularly at festivals and community gatherings in St Andrew's Church, Great Finborough. The school regularly participates in the Sudbury Festival and the Suffolk Festival of Music, Dance and Speech. Drama is available as a GCSE option. In February 2013, Finborough performing arts club performed their version of the popular musical Rent at the Theatre Royal, Bury St Edmunds.

== Houses ==
There are three school houses: Churchill, Marlborough and Nelson, named after Winston Churchill, John Churchill, 1st Duke of Marlborough and Horatio Nelson respectively. The different houses compete in various different activities, relating to sport as well as performing arts, throughout the year in order to win house points.

House	House colours
Churchill	White
Marlborough	Maroon
Nelson	Navy blue

Originally, the school was primarily for boarders and a large percentage of pupils came from military families, hence the names of the houses. The original plan for the houses was to put children of army families into Marlborough house, children of air force families into Churchill house and children from naval families into Nelson house. However, so few children came from naval or air force backgrounds that many of the army children filled in the spaces in the other houses. This plan is no longer used today; pupils are assigned a random house as soon as they join the school.

The back of Finborough Hall, the school building (July 2008).

== Achievements ==
After an inspection by the Independent Schools Inspectorate in 2005, the school was described as 'a Gem of a school'.

== Controversies ==
Headmaster Derek Slade's use of corporal punishment came under close scrutiny after a BBC Radio 4 Checkpoint investigation in 1982 and, although he escaped charges at the time, Slade left the school in 1983. The case resurfaced in 2010 and Slade was convicted of over 50 offences relating to physical and sexual abuse, sexual assault and child pornography, and sentenced to 21 years in jail. Slade died in 2016.

Teacher Simon Warr was charged with indecent assault on two former St George's School pupils, and one other child, historically, and appeared in court in 2014. Warr was found not guilty on all charges after the jury deliberated for less than 40 minutes. Warr subsequently wrote a book about his ordeal. Warr told the BBC he believed the allegations were made "on the shirt tail of Derek Slade".

== See also ==
- Hillcroft Preparatory School
- Great Finborough
- Wicklewood
- Pettiward Estate
