= George William Culme Soltau Symons =

(died 1916)

George William Culme Soltau Symons (29 May 1831 – 1916) was a Deputy Lieutenant of Devon. He was appointed Sheriff of Devonshire in 1875. He stood unsuccessfully in the 1874 parliamentary elections for Devonport as a Liberal Party candidate.

== Life ==
He was the son of George William Soltau, of Efford, and his wife Frances Goddard Culme. He was educated at Winchester College and matriculated from Oxford University in 1854. He was a cousin of Admiral Sir Michael Culme-Seymour, 3rd Baronet.

George changed his last name to Soltau-Symons by Royal Licence in 1845, and adopted the Symons arms, following the death of his great-uncle, Colonel William Symons, of Chaddlewood, in the parish of Plympton St Mary. George lived at Chaddlewood House in Plympton St Mary.

== Family ==
In 1854 Soltau Symons married the Hon. Adèle Isabella Graves, the second daughter of Lord William Thomas, the third Baron Graves. Their children included Milly Isabella Soltau Symons who married John Powys, 5th Baron Lilford and lived at Lilford Hall in Northamptonshire.

He married secondly Mary Elizabeth Coventry in 1875. Mary was the widow of Commander St John Coventry, a naval officer who lived at the Knoll, in Dorset and died in 1871. St John was a great grandson of George William Coventry, 6th Earl of Coventry.

George William Culme Soltau Symons and Mary Coventry's children included Lionel Soltau Symons who married Lucy Jessie Playfair, daughter of George James, second Baron Playfair. George had a step-daughter, Mary Louisa Coventry who married Charles Ethelston Parke, son of Charles Joseph Parke who owned the Henbury estate in Dorset.
