= Thomas Alcock (East India Company officer) =

English soldier (1762–1856)

Thomas Alcock (1762–1856) was an English soldier who served in the Bengal Army and served as Treasurer of Ordnance between 1810 and 1818.

== Early life ==
Thomas was the son of William Alcock and Mary Mawbey from Ravenstone. After the death of William, Thomas' uncle Joseph Mawbey, whose sister was William's widow, became the administrator of his brother-in-law's estate. Mawbey procured a clerkship at the Treasury for Thomas' brother, Joseph Alcock, and purchased a military commission for Thomas. Thomas served with distinction in the Bengal Army and rose to the rank of lieutenant colonel. In 1802 he married Caroline St. Leger, daughter of St Leger St Leger, 1st Viscount Doneraile. He was appointed treasurer of the ordnance in 1810. Thomas lived at Burwood House in Surrey. and latterly in Tunbridge Wells.

== Family ==
Thomas and Caroline's children included William St Leger Alcock who married Charlotte Stawell of Kilbrittain Castle. Thomas Alcock (MP) was his nephew.
