= Great Finborough =

Village in Suffolk, England

Coordinates: 52.181°N 0.945°E

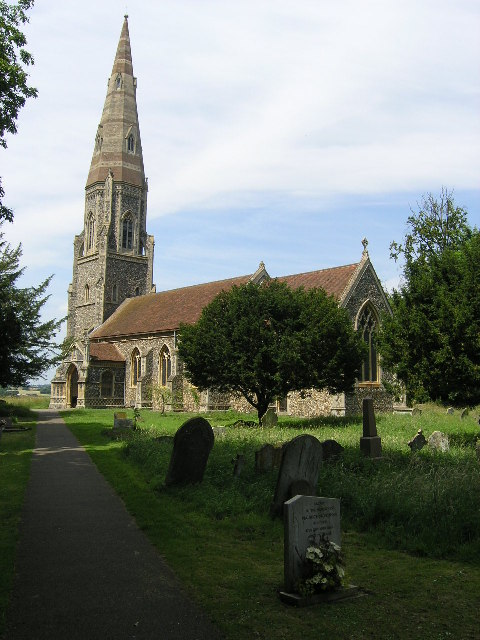
- St Andrew's church

- Location within Suffolk
- Population: 808 (2011)
- OS grid reference: TM0157
- Civil parish: Great Finborough
- District: Mid Suffolk
- Shire county: Suffolk
- Region: East
- Country: England
- Sovereign state: United Kingdom
- Post town: STOWMARKET
- Postcode district: IP14
- Dialling code: 01449
- Police: Suffolk
- Fire: Suffolk
- Ambulance: East of England
- UK Parliament: Bury St Edmunds and Stowmarket

Great Finborough is a village and civil parish in the Mid Suffolk district, in the county of Suffolk, England; about 3 miles (5 km) south west of Stowmarket and near one of the sources of the River Gipping. It has two schools, a pub and an active church. In 2001 the parish had a population of 755, increasing to 808 at the 2011 Census.

== Public transport ==
Route 461 bus service operated by Beeston's connects Finborough with Sudbury, Bildeston and Stowmarket on Tuesday and Thursday only.

== Schools ==
Finborough Hall, purchased in 1794 and rebuilt by Roger Pettiward (d.1833), sold in 1935 by the Pettiward Estate, in 2015 used as Finborough Hall School

Great Finborough has a primary school, Great Finborough CEVC Primary School, founded in 1873. Two new classrooms were added to the original buildings in 2000. The school's catchment area includes Great Finborough and the neighbouring village of Buxhall; places are offered first to children from the two villages and then to others from beyond the catchment area up to the school's intake limit. The primary school is a feeder for Stowmarket High School, to which pupils transfer at the age of 11.

The independent school Finborough School is also located in the village. About 250 pupils attend the school, which includes Nursery, Pre-Prep, Prep School, Senior School and Sixth Form.

== Religion ==
St Andrew's Church is the Church of England church. The current church is Victorian, apart from the Tudor porch, and the spire nearly reaches 300 ft. There has been a place of worship on the site for over 1000 years and in 1086 the church as well as Finborough Hall were recorded in the Domesday Book.

There was also a Congregational chapel built in 1862 which is now a private residence.

== History ==
Inside St Andrew's Church the side chapel is filled with monuments dedicated to the Wollaston family who played a big part in the Finborough Estate. They owned the estate for a century and there are monuments dedicated to nearly all the family members. The Pettiward family also played a big role: they took control of the estate after the Wollastons and owned it until the mid 1930s.

The connection with the Pettiward family meant that it gave its name to Finborough Road in Earls Court, London, developed as part of the Pettiward Estate and later the Finborough Theatre.

== Bogg Race ==
Since 1897 each Easter Monday two teams of six men from Haughley and Great Finborough race a mile across boggy fields from Boyton Hall to The Chestnut Horse pub in Finborough. The origin of the race is believed to come from a group of men who were faced with being sacked from their jobs at nearby Boyton Hall for drunkenness had to fight it out for the contract with a rival group of workers from Haughley. The farmer from Boyton Hall is believed to have thrown the contract in the air and let the two teams compete to see who could get it across the fields to the pub first. The race starts at the pub, The Chestnut Horse, where the teams from Haughley and Great Finborough get considerably drunk and are taken to a nearby farm, Boyton Hall, where they have to race over the fields, about a mile, to get to the pub with the scroll. The first man at the pub with the scroll wins and his village is declared the winner.

== Notable people ==
- William Skrene (c. 1350–1421), a prominent judge who became Lord of the Manor of Great Finborough in circa 1390.
- John Green Crosse (1790–1850), surgeon, was born at Boyton Hall, near Great Finborough.
- William Wollaston I (1659–1724), Enlightenment philosopher and author of The Religion of Nature Delineated, lived at Finborough Hall.
- William Wollaston II (1693–1757), Member of Parliament for Ipswich 1733–1734
- William Wollaston III (1731–1797), Member of Parliament for Ipswich 1768–1784
- The Pettiward family resided at Finborough Hall.
- John Peel (1939–2004), radio broadcaster, lived in a cottage nicknamed "Peel Acres" in the village from the 1970s, in which many of his shows were produced. He is buried in the graveyard of St Andrew's Church.

== Bibliography ==
- William White, History, Gazetteer, and Directory of Suffolk, and the Towns Near Its Borders (1844).
