= Joseph Alcock =

British civil servant

Joseph Alcock (1760–1821) was a British Civil Servant in the Treasury between 1785 and 1821.

== Early life ==
Joseph's parents were William Alcock and Mary Mawbey. Mary’s brothers included John and Joseph Mawbey who owned a successful vinegar distilling business. Joseph Mawbey was subsequently knighted. William Alcock purchased an estate in Ravenstone, Leicestershire, but died 1764, aged 41. He left behind a widow and four young sons of whom Joseph was the eldest. Mary outlived William and died in 1802, aged 76. After his death administration of William’s estate was given to Joseph Mawbey. He sought to support William’s sons and procured a clerkship at the Treasury for Joseph Alcock and a commission in the army for his brother Thomas Alcock. A third son, John studied law.

== Career at the Treasury ==
Joseph Alcock served in a number of senior positions in the Treasury during his life. These include as senior clerk between 1785 and 1798. Subsequently he was promoted to Chief Clerk (1798-99), a position reporting under the Joint Secretary and with a general advisory role to the Board of Treasury. He served as Chief Clerk of the Revenue (1799-1821), a period which coincided with the Napoleonic Wars, the aftermath of the American War of Independence and the War of 1812 with America. He provided evidence to the Committee on American Claimants Petition in February 1812 where he confirmed the payment of awards under the 7th Article of the Treaty of Amity (The Jay Treaty) between the United States and Great Britain in 1794 and the subsequent Convention that was ratified between the United States and Great Britain in 1802. He was appointed as one of the two Auditors of the Treasury and held this role between 1815- 1821. Joseph's son, also called Joseph Alcock worked under him at the Revenue department as an Assistant Clerk. In 1819 Joseph Junior was also appointed as Superintendent of Returns to Parliament for the Treasury Office, a position he also held in 1820.

== Family ==
Joseph married Elizabeth Tayler, the daughter of a London gunpowder merchant. Their sons included Joseph, who served as a junior clerk in the treasury, but died in 1822, John and Thomas Alcock (MP) who became an MP and who inherited the Kingswood Warren estate from a paternal uncle, a lawyer also called John Alcock. Alcock's mansion in Kingswood Warren later became a BBC Research & Development centre. After Elizabeth’s death Joseph remarried in 1815 to Mary Pettiward, daughter of Roger Mortlock Pettiward, a member of the Pettiward Family of Putney that owned the Pettiward Estate and Ms. Douglass Sandwell.

Joseph’s daughters included Maria, who married the Revd Alexander Brymer Belcher, a grandson of Jonathan Belcher (jurist), Letitia, who married Charles Parke and Jane who married Colonel Henry Austen of Bellevue, Sevenoaks, a second cousin of Jane Austen the novelist. Joseph Alcock lived in Roehampton, Putney. He also owned the Theddlethorpe estate in Lincolnshire. He died in 1821
