= Saint Mary's Church, Woolpit =

- St Mary the Virgin, Woolpit
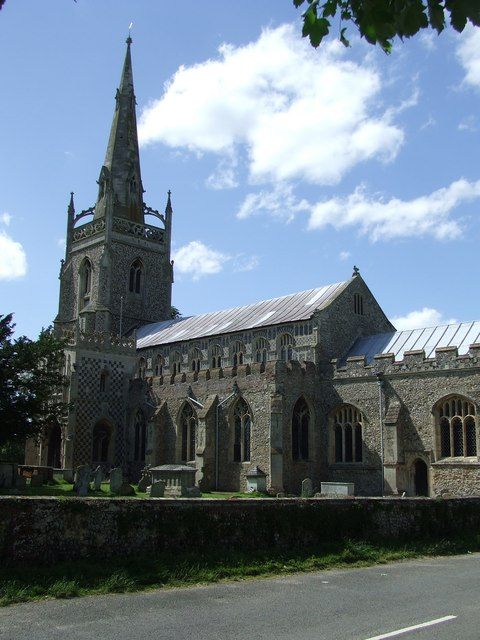

- Location in Suffolk
- 52°13′31″N 0°53′22″E
- Location: Woolpit, Suffolk
- Country: England
- Denomination: Church of England
- Website: http://www.woolpitstmary.org.uk/

History
- Dedication: Saint Mary

Architecture
- Heritage designation: Grade I
- Designated: 15 November 1954

Administration
- Diocese: Diocese of St Edmundsbury and Ipswich

Saint Mary's Church is the parish church of Woolpit, Suffolk, England. Much of the church was built in the fifteenth century but its most salient feature, the spire, was rebuilt in 1870, thanks to the architect Richard Phipson.

The church is a Grade I listed building. It has "Suffolk's most perfectly restored angel hammerbeam roof", a profusion of medieval carved pew-ends (mixed with good 19th-century recreations), and a large and very fine porch of 1430–55. The roof is actually a double hammerbeam example, with the upper beam being false. The tower and spire are by Richard Phipson in the 1850s, replacing the originals lost to lightning in 1852 or 1853. Most of the rest of the church is Perpendicular Gothic, except for the 14th-century south aisle and chancel. There is fine flushwork decoration on the exterior of the clerestory. The medieval shrine was at the east end of the south aisle. The "quite perfect" eagle lectern is a rare early-Tudor original from before the English Reformation.

== Our Lady of Woolpit ==
Until the Reformation the church housed a richly adorned statue of the Virgin Mary known as "Our Lady of Woolpit", which was an object of veneration and pilgrimage, perhaps as early as about 1211. There is a clear indication of the existence of an image of the Virgin in a mid-15th century will that speaks of "tabernaculum beate Mariae de novo faciendo" ("in making new/anew the tabernacle of Blessed Mary"), which sounds at least like a canopy or even a chapel for housing an image. It stood in its own chapel within the church. No trace of the chapel survives, but it may have been situated at the east end of the south aisle, or more probably on the north side of the chancel in the area now occupied by the 19th-century vestry.

Pilgrimage to Our Lady of Woolpit seems to have been particularly popular in the 15th and early 16th centuries, and the shrine was visited twice by King Henry VI, in 1448 and 1449.

In 1481 John, Lord Howard (from 1483 created Duke of Norfolk by Richard III), left a massive £7 9s as an offering for the shrine.

After the Tudor dynasty had consolidated its hold on the English throne, Henry VII's queen, Elizabeth of York, made a donation in 1502 of 20d to the shrine.

The statue was removed or destroyed after 1538, when Henry VIII ordered the taking down of "feigned images abused with Pilgrimages and Offerings" throughout England; the chapel was demolished in 1551, on a warrant from the Court of Augmentations.

== Lady's Well ==
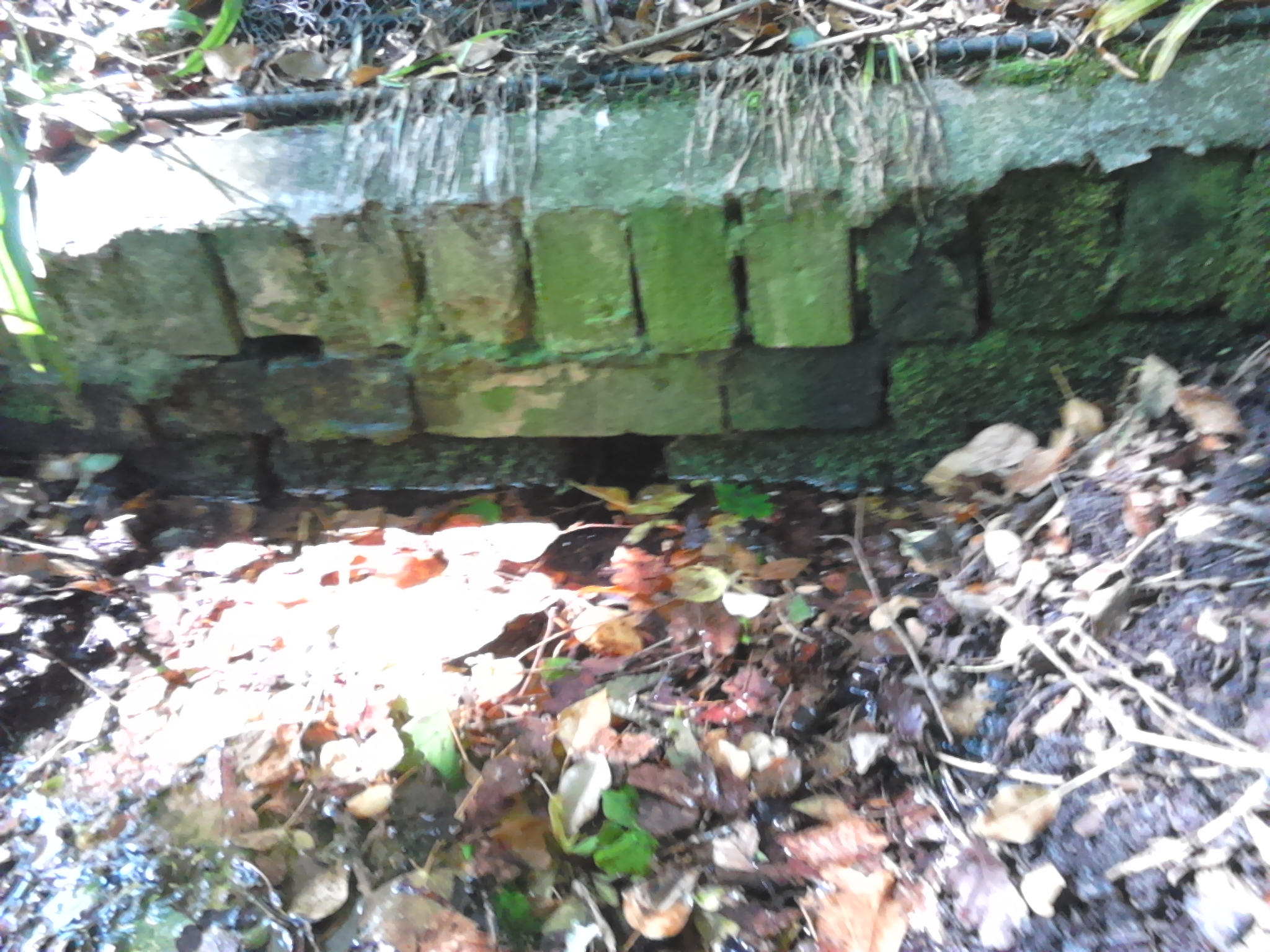
The Lady's Well of Woolpit

In a field about 300 yards north-east of the church there is a small irregular moated enclosure of unknown date, largely covered by trees and bushes and now a nature reserve. The moat is partially filled by water rising from a natural spring, protected by modern brickwork, on the south side; the moated site and the spring constitute a scheduled monument.

The spring is known as the Lady's Well or Lady Well. Although there are earlier references to a well or spring, it is first named as "Our Ladys Well" in a document dated between 1573 and 1576, referring to a manorial court meeting in 1557–58. The name suggests that it was once a holy well dedicated like the church and statue to the Virgin Mary, and it has been suggested that the well itself was a place of medieval pilgrimage. In 1820 Frederic Shoberl reported that "In a close near the east end of the church, is a spring, which is still called our Lady's Spring. Tradition reports, that the church formerly contained a shrine to the Virgin Mary, to which pilgrims resorted and that there was a chapel near the spring; but no vestiges of it are now left. The spring is quadrangular, and bricked, and supplied a large moat with very clear water". However Clive Paine in more recent research said there is no evidence to suggest that there was ever a building at the site of the well, or even to support the claim of its being a specific goal of pilgrimage. In fact the well was on land held not by the parish church but by the chapel of St John at Palgrave.

At some unknown point, a local tradition arose that the waters of the spring had healing properties. A writer in 1827 described the Lady's Well as

a perpetual spring about two feet deep of beautifully clear water, and so cold that a hand immersed in it is very soon benumbed. It is used occasionally for the immersion of weakly children, and much resorted to by persons of weak eyes.

Analysis of the water in the 1970s showed that it has a high sulphate content, which may have been of some benefit in the treatment of eye infections.
