= Hillcroft Preparatory School =

Location
- Haughley Green; Stowmarket, Suffolk, IP14 3RQ; England; 52°14′11″N 0°58′19″E

Information
- Type: Independent Day
- Established: 1911
- Closed: 15 December 2006
- Gender: Coeducational
- Age: 2 to 12

Hillcroft Preparatory School was an independent private co-educational school, located at Walnutree Manor, Haughley Green. Established in 1911, it was the oldest co-educational preparatory day school in Suffolk.

The school closed down in December 2006, after the Rapsey family (the owners) completed a deal with the nearby Finborough School which involved many staff and pupils, and much of the equipment, moving to the Finborough School site, and Walnutree Manor was sold. At the time of closure, there were fewer than 100 pupils at the school.
