= Life, Liberty and the pursuit of Happiness =

Phrase in the United States Declaration of Independence

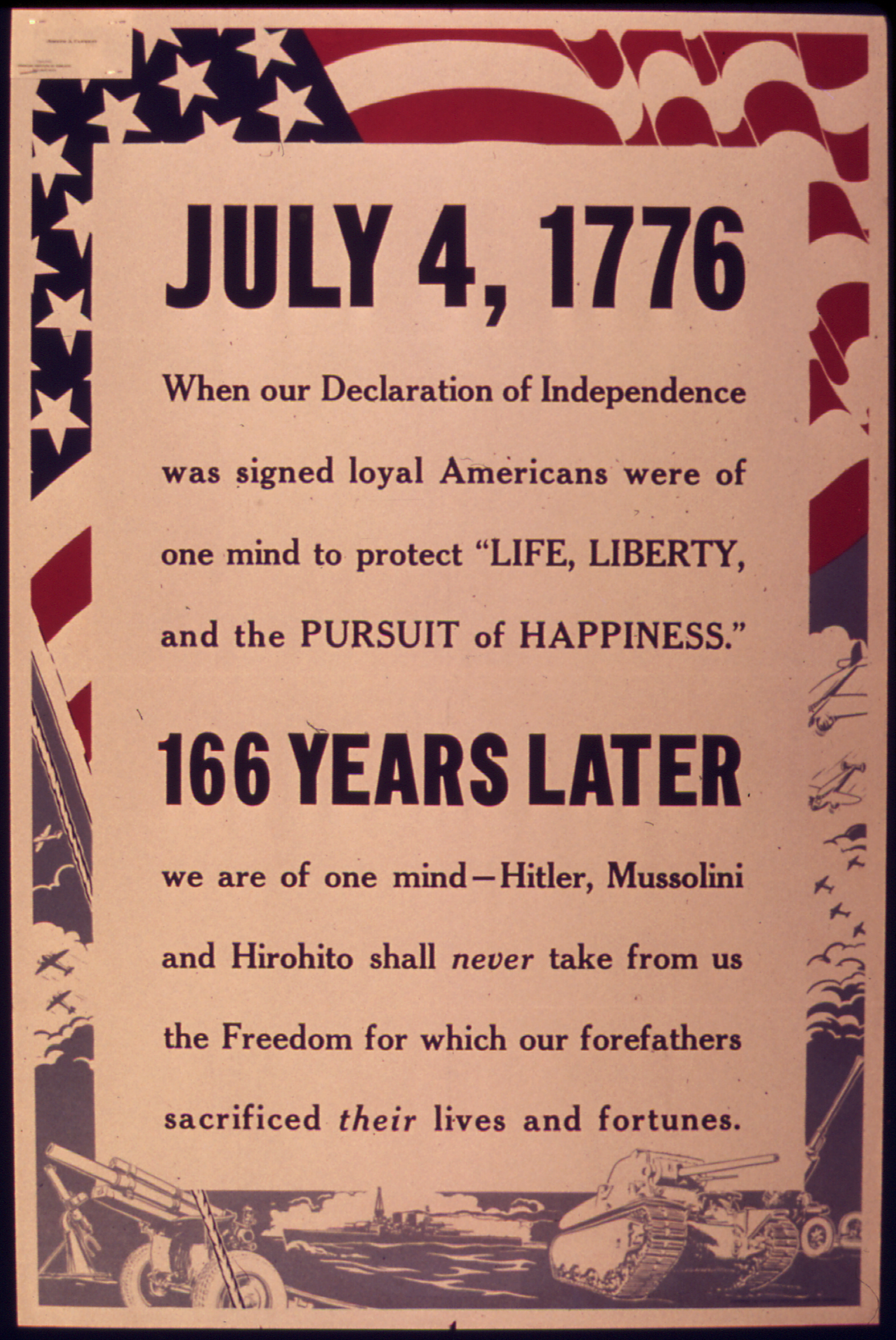
Office for Emergency Management. Office of War Information war poster (1942).

"Life, Liberty and the pursuit of Happiness" is a well-known phrase from the United States Declaration of Independence. The phrase gives three examples of the unalienable rights which the Declaration says have been given to all humans by their Creator, and which governments are created to protect. Like the other principles in the Declaration of Independence, this phrase is not legally binding, but has been widely referenced and seen as an inspiration for the basis of government.

== Origin and phrasing ==
The United States Declaration of Independence was drafted by Thomas Jefferson, and then edited by the Committee of Five, which consisted of Jefferson, John Adams, Benjamin Franklin, Roger Sherman, and Robert Livingston. It was then further edited and adopted by the Committee of the Whole of the Second Continental Congress on July 4, 1776. The second paragraph of the first article in the Declaration of Independence contains the phrase "Life, Liberty and the pursuit of Happiness".

Jefferson's "original Rough draught" is on exhibit in the Library of Congress. This version was used by Julian Boyd to create a transcript of Jefferson's draft, which reads:

We hold these truths to be sacred & undeniable; that all men are created equal & independent, that from that equal creation they derive rights inherent & inalienable, among which are the preservation of life, & liberty, & the pursuit of happiness; ...

The Committee of Five edited Jefferson's draft. Their version survived further edits by the whole Congress intact, and reads:

We hold these truths to be self-evident, that all men are created equal, that they are endowed by their Creator with certain unalienable Rights, that among these are Life, Liberty and the pursuit of Happiness. ——

A number of possible sources of inspiration for Jefferson's use of the phrase in the Declaration of Independence have been identified, although scholars debate the extent to which any one of them actually influenced Jefferson. The greatest disagreement comes between those who suggest the phrase was drawn from John Locke and those who more strongly attribute to Jean-Jacques Rousseau.

=== Lockean roots hypothesis ===
In 1689, John Locke argued in Two Treatises of Government that political society existed for the sake of protecting "property", which he defined as a person's "life, liberty, and estate". In A Letter Concerning Toleration, he wrote that the magistrate's power was limited to preserving a person's "civil interest", which he described as "life, liberty, health, and indolency of body; and the possession of outward things". He declared in his Essay Concerning Human Understanding that "the highest perfection of intellectual nature lies in a careful and constant pursuit of true and solid happiness". According to those scholars who saw the root of Jefferson's thought in Locke's doctrine, Jefferson replaced "estate" with "the pursuit of happiness", although this does not mean that Jefferson meant the "pursuit of happiness" to refer primarily or exclusively to property. Under such an assumption, the Declaration of Independence would declare that government existed primarily for the reasons Locke gave, and some have extended that line of thinking to support a conception of limited government. The Boston Pamphlet (1772), the Declaration and Resolves of the First Continental Congress (1774), and the Virginia Declaration of Rights (1776) also declare the right to life, liberty and property.

=== Virginia Declaration of Rights ===
The first and second article of the Virginia Declaration of Rights, written by George Mason and adopted unanimously by the Virginia Convention of Delegates on June 12, 1776, speaks of happiness in the context of recognizably Lockean rights and is paradigmatic of the way in which "the fundamental natural rights of mankind" were expressed at the time: "That all men are by nature equally free and independent and have certain inherent rights, of which, when they enter into a state of society, they cannot, by any compact, deprive or divest their posterity; namely, the enjoyment of life and liberty, with the means of acquiring and possessing property, and pursuing and obtaining happiness and safety."

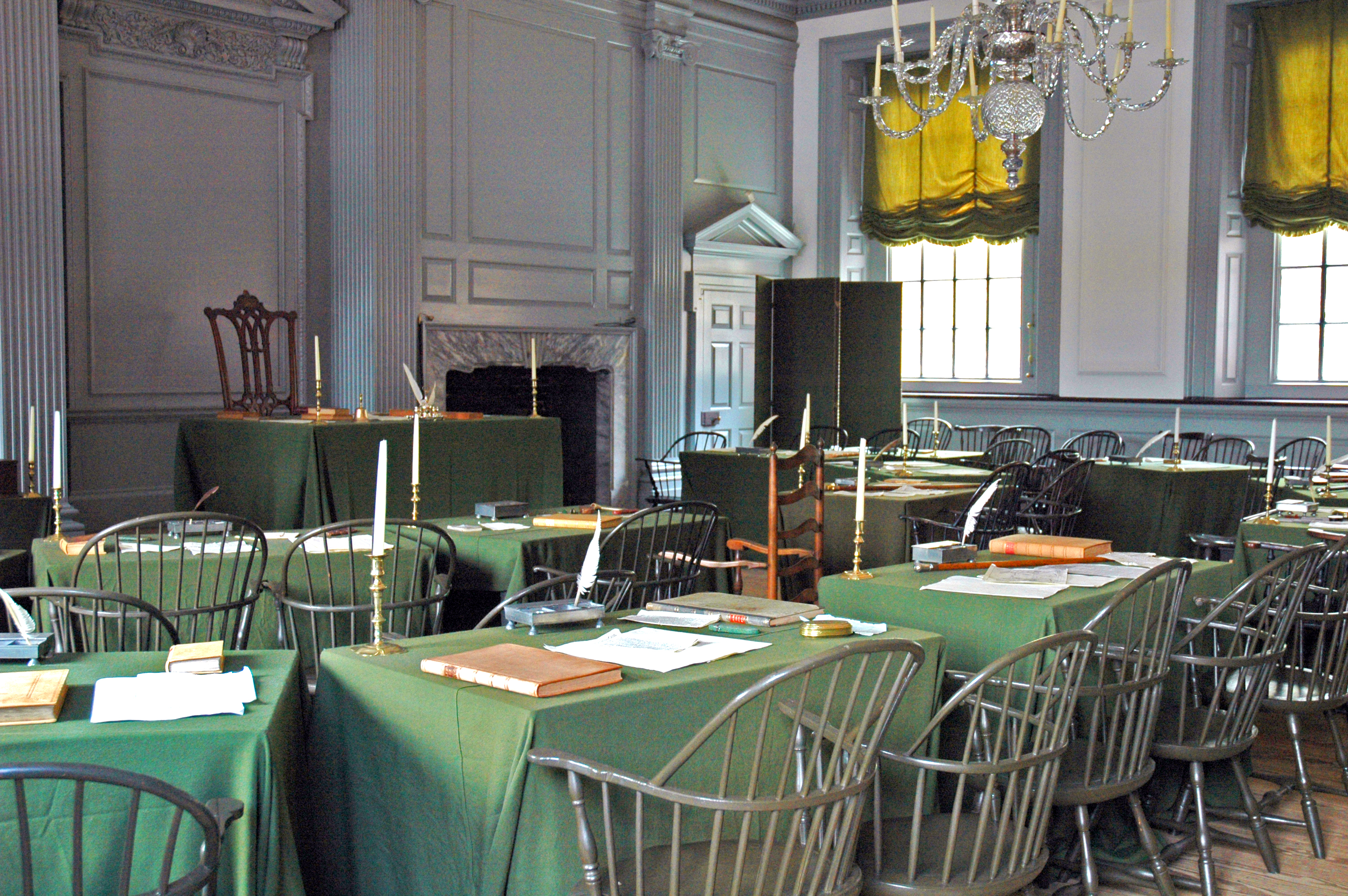
Independence Hall Assembly Room where Thomas Jefferson served in Congress

Benjamin Franklin was in agreement with Thomas Jefferson in playing down the protection of "property" as a goal of government. It is noted that Franklin found the property to be a "creature of society" and thus, he believed that it should be taxed as a way to finance civil society.

=== Alternative hypotheses ===
In 1628, Sir Edward Coke wrote in The First Part of the Institutes of the Lawes of England, his commentary on Thomas de Littleton, that "It is commonly said that three things be favoured in Law, Life, Liberty, Dower." At common law, dower was closely guarded as a means by which the widow and orphan of a deceased landowner could keep their real property.

Jefferson's phrase may be specifically based on his Epicureanism. In his Letter to William Short, Jefferson said: "As you say of yourself, I too am an Epicurean. I consider the genuine (not the imputed) doctrines of Epicurus as containing every thing rational in moral philosophy which Greece and Rome have left us." The 29th of Epicurus' 40 Principal Doctrines (on the hierarchy of desires) states that desires may be natural and necessary, natural and unnecessary, or neither natural nor necessary. Jefferson may have been enshrining a version of the "natural and necessary" category of desires into the social contract of his new country. In his Letter to Menoeceus, Epicurus of Samos stated "that among the necessary desires some are necessary for happiness, some for physical health, and some for life itself". Although the Declaration of Independence does not mention health, this may be included under "life", and liberty and autarchy are cardinal values of Epicurean philosophy.

Garry Wills has argued that Jefferson did not take the phrase from Locke and that it was indeed meant to be a standard by which governments should be judged. Wills suggests Adam Ferguson as a good guide to what Jefferson had in mind:

"If, in reality, courage and a heart devoted to the good of mankind are the constituents of human felicity, the kindness which is done infers a happiness in the person from whom it proceeds, not in him on whom it is bestowed; and the greatest good which men possessed of fortitude and generosity can procure to their fellow creatures is a participation of this happy character. If this be the good of the individual, it is likewise that of mankind; and virtue no longer imposes a task by which we are obliged to bestow upon others that good from which we ourselves refrain; but supposes, in the highest degree, as possessed by ourselves, that state of felicity which we are required to promote in the world."

The 17th-century cleric and philosopher Richard Cumberland wrote that promoting the well-being of our fellow humans is essential to the "pursuit of our own happiness". Locke never associated natural rights with happiness, but his philosophical opponent Gottfried Wilhelm Leibniz made such an association in the introduction to his Codex Iuris Gentium. William Wollaston's The Religion of Nature Delineated describes the "truest definition" of "natural religion" as being "The pursuit of happiness by the practice of reason and truth". An English translation of Jean-Jacques Burlamaqui's Principles of Natural and Politic Law prepared in 1763 extolled the "noble pursuit" of "true and solid happiness" in the opening chapter discussing natural rights. Historian Jack Rakove posits Burlamaqui as a source in addition to Locke as inspiration for Jefferson's phrase.

Another possible source for the phrase is in the Commentaries on the Laws of England published by Sir William Blackstone, from 1765 to 1769, which are often cited in the laws of the United States. Blackstone argues that God 'has so intimately connected, so inseparably interwoven the laws of eternal justice with the happiness of each individual, that the latter cannot be attained but by observing the former; and, if the former be punctually obeyed, it cannot but induce the latter. In consequence of which mutual connection of justice and human felicity, he has not perplexed the law of nature with a multitude of abstracted rules and precepts, referring merely to the fitness or unfitness of things, as some have vainly surmised; but has graciously reduced the rule of obedience to this one paternal precept, “that man should pursue his own true and substantial happiness.” This is the foundation of what we call ethics, or natural law.'

== Comparable mottos worldwide ==
The phrase is similar to a line in the Canadian Charter of Rights: "life, liberty, security of the person" (this line was also in the older Canadian Bill of Rights, which added "enjoyment of property" to the list).

The phrase can also be found in Chapter III, Article 13 of the 1947 Constitution of Japan, Chapter II, Article 10 of the 1987 Constitution of South Korea, and in President Ho Chi Minh's 1945 declaration of independence of the Democratic Republic of Vietnam. An alternative phrase "life, liberty, and property", is found in the Declaration of Colonial Rights, a resolution of the First Continental Congress.

The Fifth Amendment and Fourteenth Amendment to the United States Constitution declare that governments cannot deprive any person of "life, liberty, or property" without due process of law. Also, Article 3 of the 1948 United Nations Universal Declaration of Human Rights reads, "Everyone has the right to life, liberty, and security of person".
