= The Religion of Nature Delineated =

1722 book by William Wollaston

The Religion of Nature Delineated is a book by Anglican cleric William Wollaston that describes a system of ethics that can be discerned without recourse to revealed religion. It was first published in 1722, two years before Wollaston's death. Due to its influence on eighteenth-century philosophy and his promotion of a natural religion, the book claims for Wollaston a ranking as one of the great British Enlightenment philosophers, along with John Locke, George Berkeley, and David Hume. It contributed to the development of two important intellectual schools: British Deism, and the pursuit of happiness moral philosophy of American Practical Idealism which appears in the United States Declaration of Independence.

== Argument ==
Wollaston claimed originality for his theory that the moral evil is the practical denial of a true proposition and moral good the affirmation of it, writing that this attempt to use mathematics to create a rationalist ethics was "something never met with anywhere". Wollaston "held that religious truths were plain as Euclid, clear to all who contemplated Creation." Isaac Newton had induced natural laws from a mathematical model of the physical world; similarly, Wollaston was attempting to induce moral laws by a mathematical model of the moral world.

== Structure ==
Wollaston begins his book with the proposition of three questions:

I. Is there really any such thing as natural religion, properly and truly so called?

II. If there is, what is it?

III. How may a man qualify himself, so as to be able to judge, for himself, of the other religions profest in the world; to settle his own opinions in disputable matters; and then to enjoy tranquillity of mind, neither disturbing others, nor being disturbed at what passes among them?

Wollaston defines truth thus: "propositions are true which express things as they are." His assumption is that religion and morality are identical. His most famous and often-quoted sentence defines his answers to the questions quoted:

And so at last natural religion is grounded upon this triple and strict alliance or union of truth, happiness and reason all in the same interest and conspiring by the same methods to advance and perfect human nature and its truest definition is, The pursuit of happiness by the practice of reason and truth.

== Publication details ==
Though other writers, including Dr. Samuel Clarke, had written on natural religion, Wollaston was attempting the first systematic proof of a system of ethics based on nature alone. The Religion of Nature Delineated was a work of constructive (positive) deism rather than critical (negative) deism. Written by a Church of England clergyman, this positive attempt at new system of ethics logically reasoned from nature struck a chord with the intellectual public of the British Empire: more than 10,000 copies were sold in the just first few years alone.

A measure of its quick rise and somewhat slower fall in popularity and influence can be shown from its 22 imprints prior to 1800. There was Wollaston's private edition in 1722; after his death there was one public edition in 1724, five in 1725, five in 1726, two in 1731, one in 1737, four in 1738, one in 1746, one 1750, and one in 1759.

== Influence ==
Wollaston's reputation involves varied reactions: observers often begin by expressing admiration for him and his work, but later publicly reject his ideas while still adopting portions of his core concepts.

=== Great Britain ===
Wollaston's idea of a natural religion without revelation briefly inspired and revived the movement known as Deism in England. Some today consider him a "Christian Deist", while others note that there is no "significant evidence that William Wollaston was not a more or less orthodox Christian."

Wollaston's idea that science and math could define a morality based on nature predated the scientific morality of Scottish innate or commonsense moral philosophy. Wollaston also held that a person is happy when the sum total of pleasure exceeds pains, anticipating Utilitarianism. Proponents of later schools of philosophy later criticised and sometimes even ridiculed Wollaston, including Francis Hutcheson, David Hume, Richard Price, and Jeremy Bentham.

After 1759 no further editions of his work was published in the rest of the century.

=== America ===
One source of influence was both immediate, and immediately rejected. Benjamin Franklin, who was in London 1725–1726 as a young journeyman printer, tells us in his Autobiography that he typeset one of the 1726 editions of the book. Though untutored outside of two years spent in the Boston Grammar school, it provoked him to write at age 19 the short pamphlet A Dissertation on Liberty and Necessity, Pleasure and Pain. He printed one hundred copies. But he quickly found it "so shallow and unconvincing as to be embarrassing", and like Wollaston's own juvenile attempt in 1691 (a poetic discourse inspired by Ecclesiastes), he disavowed it and burned as many copies as he could find. Still, Wollaston's concern with morality and happiness struck a chord in Franklin. Though Franklin rejected Deism, saying "I began to suspect the doctrine, though it might be true, was not very useful", he retained a fondness for Wollaston's "pursuit of happiness" natural religion in general, believing that God was best served by doing good works and helping other people.

The Colonial American Rev. Dr. Samuel Johnson first read Wollaston in 1727. He agreed that there was a tendency towards Deism in Wollastson's work, writing in his own Autobiography that "Wollaston's Religion of Nature, though well meant, was a great stumbling block to many and what he could never had done without the data in Scripture, though he seemed insensible of it." Johnson combined Wollaston's natural religion with George Berkeley's idealism, and created a pursuit of happiness philosophy over a series of seven editions of college philosophy textbooks. Its focus on practice as well as speculation attracted a more mature Franklin, who commissioned and published Johnson's textbook Elementa Philosophica in 1752, then promoted it in the College of Philadelphia (now Penn University).

Johnson saw his work as both a "New System" and an extension of Wollaston's concept of a natural religion that was suitable for teaching to a young man of any denomination. Thus, "a domestically mediated version" of Wollaston and other philosophers led to the "harmonizing sentiment" that was acceptable to all the delegates at the Continental Congress. By the time of the Revolution, a generation of Colonials had been exposed to the ideas of natural religion in the form of "Nature and Nature's God", and "the pursuit of Happiness" — both of which may be found in the United States Declaration of Independence.

Thomas Jefferson referred to it in a letter to Thomas Law.
