= Pettiward Estate =

London aristocratic property estate

Finborough Hall, Great Finborough, near Stowmarket, Suffolk, purchased in 1794 and rebuilt by Roger Pettiward (d.1833) and sold in 1935 by his eventual heir Roger Gamelyn Pettiward (1906–1942), in 2021 used as Finborough Hall School

The Pettiward Estate is a privately owned set of reversions in the far edge of two inner boroughs of south-west London, England, now owned by a family trust of the family, who were from 1794 until 1935 of Finborough Hall, Suffolk. The family oversaw and took a direct involvement in much of the speculative development of these areas: parts of West Brompton and small parts of Putney.

== Extent ==
The family trust's key landholdings are in Putney and West Brompton, London. Most of the houses were originally let for a large premium, to give long leases, archetypally 99 years. These have been gradually reduced in number by freehold enfranchisement, however value loss has been counteracted by a manifold increase in property prices in the capital over the last centuries, greater than all other British cities.

== Descent ==
- John Pettiward - In 1630 John Pettiward married Sarah White daughter and heiress of Henry White of Putney, who during the Commonwealth appointed by Parliament as Sheriff of Surrey in 1653.
- Roger Pettiward (fl.1660) - The Pettiwards appear to have been Royalists, and following the Restoration of the Monarchy of 1660, "Roger Pettiward, Esq. of Putney", was listed as one of the persons qualified to be elected one of the proposed Knights of the Royal Oak, which Order of Chivalry was not proceeded with for political reasons.
- John Pettiward (born 1652) of Putney - married Honor Davies and left an only daughter as sole heiress, Elizabeth Pettiward (born 1685), who in 1709 married George Mortlock.

Mortlock's Name Act 1749
- Act of Parliament
- Parliament of Great Britain
- Long title: An Act to enable Roger Mortlock Doctor in Divinity, now called Roger Pettiward, and the Heirs of his Body, to take and use the Surname and Arms of Pettiward.
- Citation: 23 Geo. 2. c. 8 Pr.
- Territorial extent: Great Britain

Dates
- Royal assent: 14 March 1750
- Commencement: 16 November 1749 (Note: Start of session.)

Status: Current legislation

- Rev. Roger (Mortlock) Pettiward (1712–1780) - Elizabeth Pettiward's son, of Fairfax House, Putney, in 1749 succeeded to the estates of his uncle Walter Pettiward (d.1749), under which terms, in 1750 he obtained a private act of Parliament, Mortlock's Name Act 1749 (23 Geo. 2. c. 8 Pr.), to adopt the surname and arms of Pettiward in lieu of his patronymic.
- Roger Pettiward (1754–1833), FRS, Fellow of the Society of Antiquaries eldest son and heir. He was a partner in the wholesale stationery firm of Wright and Gill, of Abchurch Lane, but soon retired from business. Master of the Worshipful Company of Stationers (1831-2). In 1794 he purchased Finborough Hall, near Stowmarket, Suffolk, from Col.William Wollaston (died 1797), MP. He died in 1833 at Trafford Park, Lancashire, aged 78. The Pettiward family had owned the nearby manor of Onehouse since the 16th century. He rebuilt Finborough Hall in 1795 to a design by Francis Sandys of Bury St Edmonds (who also worked at Ickworth House). He was Sheriff of Suffolk in 1811. There were no surviving male heirs.
- Robert John (Bussell) Pettiward (died 1908) - Lady Hotham was succeeded in 1856 as the income-receiving beneficiary (life tenant) by her husband's great-nephew Robert John Bussell (d.1908), who as privately required adopted the surname Pettiward. This also enabled taking up for life in any of the homes from time to time fully vacant, and he chose the customary seat, per his probate, of Finborough Hall He married Lady Frances Catherine Nelson (d.1877), eldest daughter of Thomas Nelson, 2nd Earl Nelson (1786–1835). Robert John Pettiward decided to build houses on the land, and had plans completed for so doing in October 1862. A sewer had been built under the land in 1855 by the Metropolitan Commissioner of Sewers, under compulsory powers, unbeknownst to Pettiward, who in 1865 claimed compensation of £1,500 as his plans would need redrawing. The Pettiward's building contractor was William Corbett and Alexander McClymont, who built most of the houses in the 1860s. About 220 houses were built at that time on land owned by R. J. Pettiward. He died in 1908 leaving or having had only 9 daughters, so per the tail male the estates passed to his cousin below, who in 1908 by royal licence adopted the surname Pettiward in lieu of his patronymic. Robert's probate was sworn in 1908 at £107,264 (equivalent to about £11,200,000 in 2025).
- Charles (Terry) Pettiward (1855–1933) - cousin, who in 1908 by royal licence adopted the surname Pettiward in lieu of his patronymic. In 1904 he married Eliza Mary Gamlen (1880–1952), 6th daughter of Robert Heale Gamlen of New Place, Welwyn. He died in 1933; his probates, personal and as to his trust interests, were resworn the next year at £208,541 (equivalent to about £12,900,000 in 2025).
- Roger Gamelyn Pettiward (1906–1942) - latterly of the Causeway, Braughing, eldest son and heir, a well-critiqued cartoonist in Punch Magazine who used the pseudonym "Paul Crum", educated at Eton College, Christ Church, Oxford, where he studied agriculture, and as an art student at the Vienna State Academy, the Munich State Academy and Slade School of Art. In 1932 he was part of an expedition with Peter Fleming to Brazil to search for the British explorer Percy Harrison Fawcett who had disappeared in the Brazilian jungle in 1925. In 1933 following his father's death he inherited the Pettiward estates and sold Finborough Hall in 1935. In 1935 he married Diana Berners-Wilson, daughter of Frederick Berners-Wilson of the Hardwick, Abergavenny, Wales, and in 1938/9 built a modern home at The Studio House, Duke's Head Yard, Highgate High Street, North London. He served in World War II with the Bedfordshire and Hertfordshire Regiment and was killed in action on 19 August 1942 at Dieppe whilst leading a commando troop against German coastal guns. he left a son and heir (below). His two probates (for trust interests in and free ones) were sworn in 1943 at £152,912 (equivalent to about £6,028,000 in 2025), with a further effects (being 13.4%) of this coming to light for a third grant needed in 1946.
- Charles Pettiward (born 1936).

== West Brompton, SW10 ==
This part of the estate takes up what was the north-west corner of Chelsea, south of Earl's Court and north of World's End. Surviving records show the Pettiward family as landowners in south-west Kensington in the 1640s. Their West Brompton estate appears to have been acquired later, by Walter Pettiward (died 1749). The Pettiwards sold a small part of their estate to James I Gunter (died 1819) in 1811, a confectioner of Berkeley Square, whose son Robert I Gunter (d.1852) and grandsons Sir Robert Gunter, 1st Baronet (1831–1905) and James II Gunter developed much other land in the area, one of his main streets being Gunter Grove, the southern continuation of Finborough Road beyond the junction with Fulham Road. The estate was bounded to the west by the land of William Edwardes, 2nd Baron Kensington (1777–1852), 39 acres of which he sold before 1840 to form the Brompton Cemetery, opened in 1840. The eastern boundary was the east side of Redcliffe Gardens, the property of James Gunter. The northern boundary was the back of the houses on Redcliffe Lane. The north–south extent thus comprised numbers 2 to 58 Redcliffe Gardens, west side.

The estate bordered:

- to west: land of William Edwardes, 2nd Baron Kensington (1777–1852), 39 acres (0.16 km^{2}) of which he sold before 1840 to form the Brompton Cemetery, opened in 1840.
- to east: east side of Redcliffe Gardens, the property of James Gunter.
- to north: rear of houses on Redcliffe Lane. The north–south extent thus comprised numbers 2 to 58 Redcliffe Gardens, west side.

The highest-ceiling homes tend to draw on the South Kensington style, red but also frequently polychromatic (involving cream, yellow and dark shades of red/brown) brick terraces, many distinguished by rusticated quoins and other stone dressings, particularly light, multi-level cornices (at lower storeys often called plats/bands).

- Finborough Road, the southern half only, both sides, named after the Pettiward family seat of Finborough Hall in Suffolk. A road running on a north–south axis between Fulham Road and Old Brompton Road.
- Redcliffe Gardens, anciently "Walnut Tree Lane", the southern half only, west side only, numbers 2 to 58; the freeholder of the east side was James Gunter. Redcliffe Gardens runs parallel to and on the east side of Finborough Road. The name "Redcliffe" was selected by James Gunter, whose larger estate to the immediate east of the Pettiward Estate he named the "Redcliffe Estate".
- Ifield Road, anciently "Honey Lane", southern three quarters only, both sides, immediately west of and parallel to Finborough Road, also running on a north–south axis between Fulham Road and Old Brompton Road.

== Putney ==
The Pettiward family owned farms in part of the area between the Lower and Upper Richmond Roads. Roger Astley (died 1780) by his will dated 15 February 1778 bequeathed to Roger Pettiward his "copyhold estate at Putney consisting of three tenements". In 1893 on this agricultural land immediately east of Erpingham Road was built an athletic track and concrete cycling velodrome, the first of its type in the United Kingdom. In 1904 houses were built on the land, as to these key streets:

- Earldom Road
- Landford Road
- Clarendon Drive
- Hotham Road

== Sources ==
- Burke's Genealogical and Heraldic History of the Landed Gentry, 15th Edition, ed. Pirie-Gordon, H., London, 1937, pp. 1796-7, pedigree of Pettiward formerly of Finborough Hall
