= Thomas Wright (lord mayor) =

Lord Mayor of London in 1785

Thomas Wright (died 7 April 1798) was Sheriff of the City of London in 1779 and Lord Mayor of London in 1785.
