= A Dissertation on Liberty and Necessity, Pleasure and Pain =

1725 pamphlet by Benjamin Franklin

A Dissertation on Liberty and Necessity, Pleasure and Pain is a philosophical pamphlet by Benjamin Franklin, published in London in 1725 in response to The Religion of Nature Delineated.

== Arguments about human motivation ==
It argues that an omnipotent, benevolent God is incompatible with notions of human free will and morality. The second portion of the pamphlet goes on to formulate that all motivations are derived from pain and that pain is met with an equal amount of pleasure. He then concludes that this means that man cannot be superior to animals because we are all equal in God's eyes. Franklin acknowledges how offensive this idea would be to the reader, and refuted it later.

== Calvinist influence ==
The point of the pamphlet seems to follow Calvinism. Franklin was raised Calvinist as a child but in his teenage years became a Deist, arguing that Calvinism cannot logically be a moral way to live.

== Preservation of copies ==
In 1779, Franklin came to disagree with the points he printed in Dissertation and burned all the copies he possessed of the pamphlet but one for historical purposes. However, since he had already come to give several copies to friends of his, four original copies still survive. They are in the possession of the British Library, Library of Congress, John Carter Brown Library, and Yale University Library.

== See also ==
- The Religion of Nature Delineated
- The Papers of Benjamin Franklin
