= Finborough Hall =

Country house in Suffolk, England

Coordinates: 52.1842°N 0.9462°E

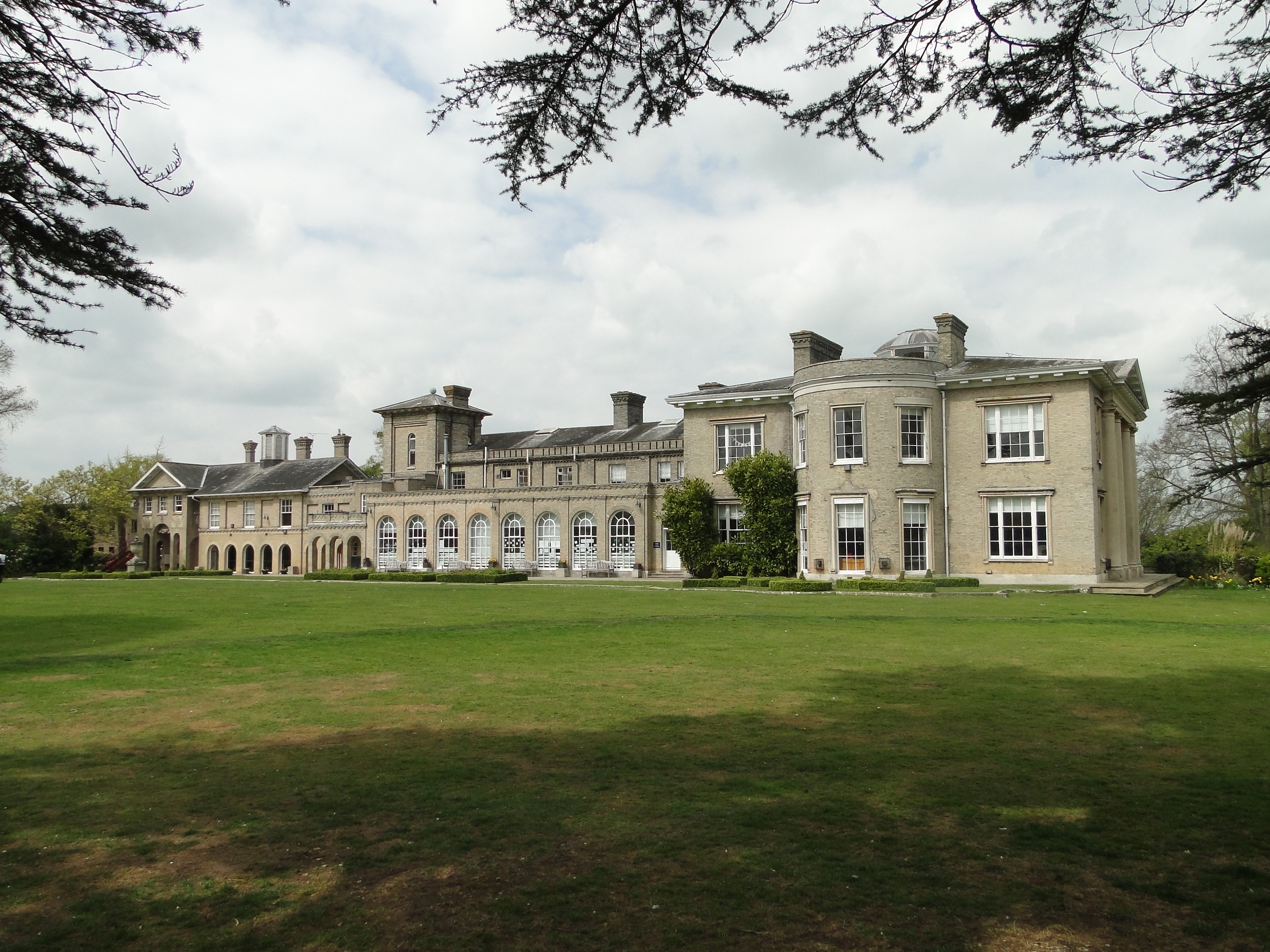
Finborough Hall

Finborough Hall is a Grade II listed stucco-faced Tuscan-style country house in Great Finborough, Suffolk, England.

The grounds were originally purchased by Roger Pettiward from Colonel William Wollaston MP. Roger Pettiward rebuilt Finborough Hall in 1795 to a design by Francis Sandys of Bury St Edmunds, who had also worked at Ickworth House.

Finborough Hall, due to its association with the Pettiward family, subsequently gave its name to Finborough Road in London, developed as part of the Pettiward Estate in north-west Chelsea, London SW10, still owned by the Pettiward family. This led to the name of Finborough Theatre. The Hall's original c1700 staircase was moved to Rougham Hall in 1878.

Finborough School is based in Finborough Hall, and it had previously been the headquarters of the Eastern Electricity Board.
