= Henbury, Dorset =

Hamlet in Dorset, England

Coordinates: 50.78689°N 2.05771°W

Henbury
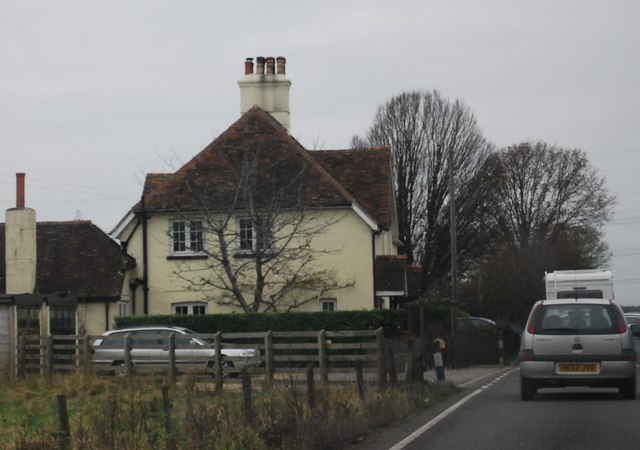
- Henbury Cottages on the A31

- Location within Dorset
- OS grid reference: SY960985
- Civil parish: Sturminster Marshall
- Unitary authority: Dorset
- Ceremonial county: Dorset
- Region: South West
- Country: England
- Sovereign state: United Kingdom
- Post town: WIMBORNE
- Postcode district: BH21
- Dialling code: 01258
- Police: Dorset
- Fire: Dorset and Wiltshire
- Ambulance: South Western
- UK Parliament: North Dorset

Henbury is a hamlet in the civil parish of Sturminster Marshall in Dorset, England. It lies on the A31 road.

Henbury House is a classical Georgian house built in 1770. In the 19th century the estate was held by the Parke family. In the 1870s two members of the family emigrated to Australia and founded Henbury Station, a cattle station some 140 km south of Alice Springs, near where the Henbury Crater was discovered in 1899.

Henbury House (renamed Henbury Hall) was the subject of a failed holiday time-share scheme in the 1980s which was designed to cover the cost of its refurbishment. In 1982 the then owners Charles and Susan Maitland offered bonds for sale at £500 each, guaranteeing investors a week's family holiday a year in the house for five years. This was followed by a second Bond issue in 1983 at £1500. However, the venture failed during 1984 and in 1985 the property was sold to Roy and Guy Baylis. The Maitlands filed for bankruptcy which was completed in 1988 with a dividend of 24 pence in the pound for creditors. A private housing development called Henbury House Gardens was then built on the land surrounding the house.
