= William Wollaston (Ipswich MP elected 1768) =

British Member of Parliament

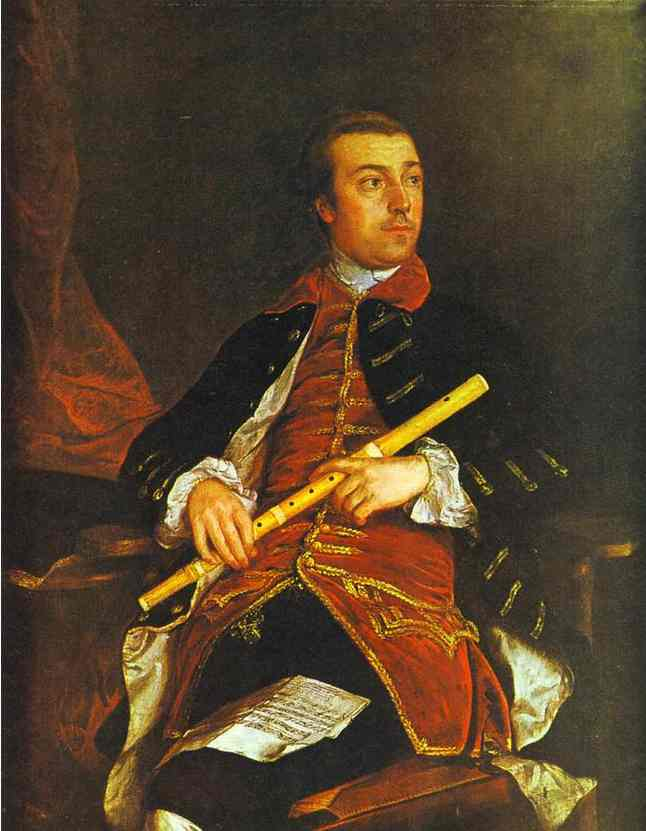
William Wollaston MP

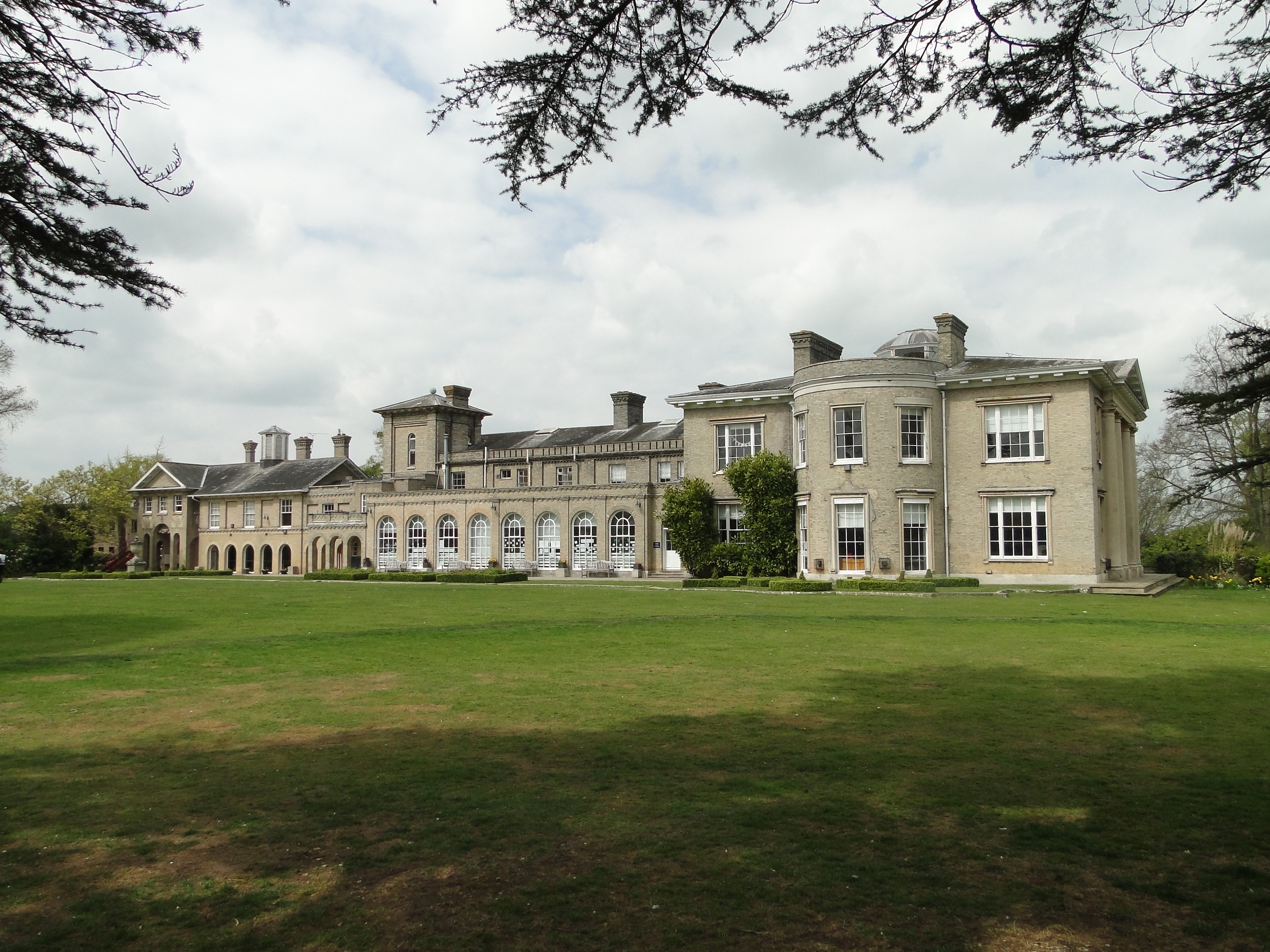
Finborough Hall, Suffolk

Colonel William Wollaston (1731, Finborough Hall, Great Finborough, Suffolk – 10 November 1797, Bath) was a British Member of Parliament for Ipswich between 1768 and 1784.

== Life ==
He was born the eldest son of William Wollaston, MP and his wife Elizabeth Fauquier and educated at Bury St Edmunds Grammar School.

Before gaining his position in Parliament, he served as Colonel of the 2nd or East Suffolk Battalion in the Suffolk Militia. When the militia was embodied in 1778 during the War of American Independence, when the country was threatened with invasion by the Americans' allies, France and Spain, Wollaston commanded his battalion at a training encampment at Warley in Essex. However, he gave up the command in 1780.

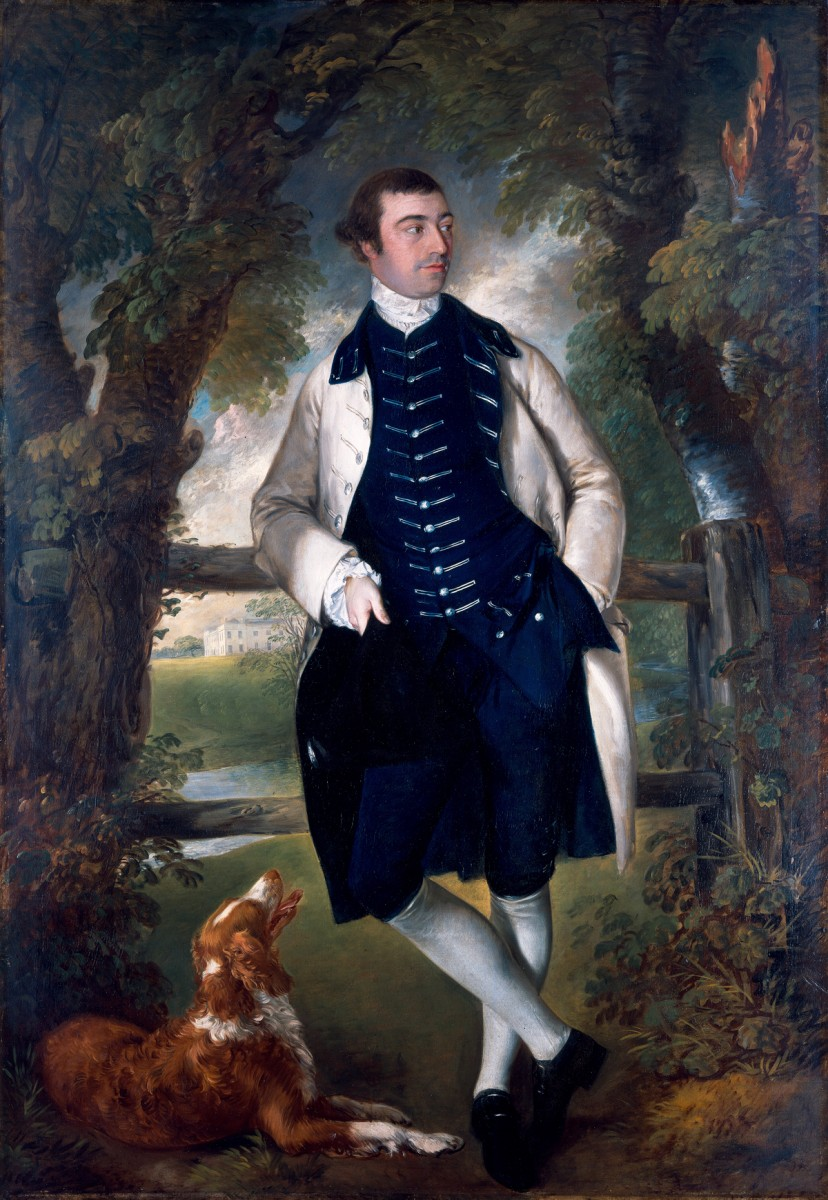
Portrait by Thomas Gainsborough, c.1759

He was a close friend of artist Thomas Gainsborough, with whom he shared a love of music. Gainsborough painted Wollaston's portrait in about 1758 shortly before the artist left Ipswich to settle in the spa town of Bath.. In 1794 to pay off a gambling debt Wollaston sold the family estate of Finborough Hall to Roger Pettiward (d.1833), whose family owned the neighbouring estate at Onehouse.

== Family ==
Wollaston was married to Blanche, daughter of Robert Hyde Page and sister of Sir Thomas-Hyde Page. They had no children.

== Notes ==
Parliament of Great Britain
Preceded by Francis Vernon; Thomas Staunton	Member of Parliament for Ipswich; 1768–1784; With: Thomas Staunton	Succeeded by William Middleton; John Cator
