= Love on a Branch Line =

Love on a Branch Line may refer to:

- Love on a Branch Line (novel), a 1959 novel by John Hadfield
- Love on a Branch Line (TV series), a 1994 television adaptation of the book
