= J64 =

J64 may refer to:

- Augmented tridiminished icosahedron
- HMCS Comox (J64), a minesweeper of the Royal Canadian Navy
- LNER Class J64, a British steam locomotive class
