= Mendlesham railway station =

Disused railway station in Suffolk, England

Coordinates: 52.2473°N 1.0787°E

Mendlesham

General information
- Location: Mendlesham, Mid Suffolk; England
- Platforms: 1

Other information
- Status: Disused

History
- Original company: Mid-Suffolk Light Railway
- Post-grouping: LNER and then British Railways

Key dates
- 29 September 1908: Station opens
- 28 July 1952: Station closes
Location

Mendlesham railway station was a station on the Mid-Suffolk Light Railway.

== History ==
Mendlesham railway station was a station on the Mid Suffolk Light Railway in the village of Mendlesham, Suffolk. The station was opened in 1908 and closed in 1952.

The Station was four miles from Haughley and was made up of a 130-foot (40 m) platform with the standard MSLR corrugated iron clad station building with an open waiting room with an ornate fronted canopy with a booking office on the left side and a store room on the other side. This building makes up part of the Mid-Suffolk Light Railway Society collection.

Former Services

Preceding station	Disused railways	Following station
Haughley	Mid-Suffolk Light Railway	Brockford and Wetheringsett
