= Rolling stock of the mid-Suffolk light railway =

This is a list of rolling stock used by the Mid-Suffolk Light Railway.

== Locomotives ==
=== Original ===
- LNER Class J64 (the reclassification of the original 3 MSLR engines)
- LNER Class J65
- LNER Class J15

=== Preserved ===
The railway has several steam and diesel locomotives, with some of these undergoing restoration or overhaul.

Number & Name	Class	Current Status	Image
2315	Barclay 0-4-0ST	Operational as of 2026.	
2525	Cockerill 0-4-0VBT	Operational, privately owned.	
985	LNER Y7 0-4-0T	Undergoing Overhaul, owned by the North Norfolk Railway. On loan.	
1604	Hudswell Clarke 0-6-0ST	Under restoration.	
304470; Alston	Ruston & Hornsby 0-4-0DM Class 165	Operational, mostly used for shunting.	
294266; Sir William McAlpine	Ruston & Hornsby 0-4-0DM Class 48	Operational, mostly used for shunting. Bought directly from Sir William McAlpine. Same class of locomotive as was used by contractors to remove the original Middy-Line. Privately owned by volunteer and Youtuber Lawrie Rose who has a YouTube channel called Lawrie's Mechanical Marvels.	

=== Previous ===
- LNER Class J15 No. 7564 0-6-0, built 1912.
- LB&SCR A1 class No. 662 0-6-0T 'Martello', built 1875.
- Andrew Barclay 0-4-0ST W/No. 2069 'Little Barford', built 1939.
- Hawthorn Leslie 0-4-0ST 'Falmouth Docks and Engineering Co. No. 3'
- W. G. Bagnall No. 2565 0-4-0ST, built 1946

== Rolling stock ==
=== Passenger carriages ===
The MSLR's coaching stock is entirely made up of ex-GER carriages, to replicate what the line's original stock would've been like many years ago.

Railway	Number	Type	Current Status	Image
Great Eastern Railway	180, MSLR No. 15	Four-wheel Horse box	Built in 1869, sold out of service in 1896 for £6. Earliest preserved horse box. Now restored and in service.	
Great Eastern Railway	278	Four-wheel Third	Built in 1876. Body only, now under restoration, used as a buffet while grounded and being restored.	
Great Eastern Railway	13, MSLR No. 12	Four-wheel Brake Third	Built in 1875. Body grounded in 1932 twenty years after withdrawal in 1910. Restored between 2000 and 2002. On chassis of ex-LNER 'Queen Mary' Brakevan. Operational.	
Great Eastern Railway	287, MSLR No. 13	Four-wheel Third, now running as composite	Built in 1876. Body only, restored and operational as MSLR No. 13.	
Great Eastern Railway	140	Four-wheel first	Built in 1863. Restored and operational in GER livery as of 2017. Oldest preserved GER carriage with confirmed build date.	
Great Eastern Railway	424	Third, later second	Built in 1892. Body only. Restored body of 424 now in use as a static bar, painted in a light green and cream livery.	
Great Eastern Railway	506	Brake third	Build date unknown. Went to the MSLR from a private address in Holland-on-Sea, in Essex where it had been since 1925.	

There are also several wagons and freight items that are under restoration and operational.

Some signs of the original rolling stock is visible in the countryside surrounding the railway. One example is a semi-derelict carriage on farmland near Mendlesham at (52.249007°N 1.0601738°E). It may be seen on Google maps satellite view.

=== Wagons ===
The railway owns a few vintage Great Eastern covered vans, one LNER van, a special LNER survivor; a 'Toad B' brake van No. 157787, due to the mass amount of vans and minuscule open wagons, the MSLR built a replica open wagon to a GER design in 2012.

Railway	Number	Type	Current Status	Image
GER	620791	Covered goods van	Built in 1900 to diagram no. 15 at Stratford. Under restoration. Stored at the end of a siding with 680360.	
GER	620262	Covered goods van body	Built in 1900 to diagram no. 15. Was in use as a stores room before restoration. Grounded body.	
GER	11873	Covered goods van	Built in 1913 to diagram no. 72 at Stratford. Restored and now operational.	
GER	12404	Covered goods van	Built in 1913 to diagram no. 72. Moved from the Mid-Norfolk Railway to the Mid-Suffolk Light Railway in 2009.	
LNER	157787	Goods brake van	Built in 1929 to diagram no. 34 at Doncaster. Sold in 1963 to Tunnel Cement, Grays. Purchased and preserved for the Kent and East Sussex Railway as No. 119. Arrived in June, 1977. Arrived on the MSLR in 1995. Restored and operational in LNER livery.	
LMS	506875	Covered goods van.	Built in 1935 to diagram no. D1897 in lot no. 824 at Derby. Restored and operational.	
	9431	5-plank open wagon	Little information of this wagon known. The number '9431' is fictional, and the wagon has been lettered "M. O. Y, Colchester"	
MSLR	28601	5-plank open wagon	Built in 2012. A replica of a Great Eastern Railway open wagon. Body placed onto a wagon frame no. 106. Now restored and operational.	
	N 600043	8-plank open wagon	Originally a 5-plank open wagon, this was rebuilt to an 8-plank wagon. Previously was a resident on the Swindon and Cricklade Railway.	
	36	3-plank open wagon	Little known about this wagon. Lettered "Jackson & Co. Haughley"	
LNER	DE 470819	Ballast brake van	Built in 1948 to diagram no. 203 by R. Y. Pickering and Co. Restored.	
GWR	139455	Covered goods van	Built in 1938 to diagram No. V.23 at Swindon. A new body was built by the Mid-Suffolk Light Railway for the van. Restored and operational.	
GER	5043	7-plank open wagon	Built in 1908 to diagram no. 17 at Stratford. It was in use at ROF Puriton until purchased for use on the West Somerset Railway. Donated to the MSLR in 1995 and arrived later that year but was cut down to a 5-plank wagon. Restoration started in 2005 and was complete by 2011 and 5043 was restored to its original condition. Operational in GER livery.	

== Former stock ==
=== Carriages ===
Railway	Number	Type	Current Status	Image
NER	131	Six-wheel Full Brake	Built to NER diagram no. 171. Carriage body preserved by the MSLR in 1994. Moved to Whitwell & Reepham railway station in June 2012 when placed on a tube wagon underframe. Later transported to Kirkby Stephen East station in June 2014 where restoration work could take place. By August 2018 a significant amount of work done, it will later returned to its original six-wheel appearance.	

=== Wagons ===
Railway	Number	Type	Current Status	Image
LNER	680360	Covered goods van	Was under restoration at the MSLR in an open siding but moved to the Stainmore Railway at Kirkby Stephen East railway station in 2015. Now numbered 241245 and repainted in a blue engineering train livery.	
