= Listed buildings in Wetheringsett-cum-Brockford =

Civil Parish in Suffolk, England

Wetheringsett-cum-Brockford is a village and civil parish in the Mid Suffolk District of Suffolk, England. It contains 53 listed buildings that are recorded in the National Heritage List for England. Of these one is grade I and 52 are grade II.

This list is based on the information retrieved online from Historic England.

== Key ==
Grade	Criteria
I	Buildings that are of exceptional interest
II*	Particularly important buildings of more than special interest
II	Buildings that are of special interest

== Listing ==
Name	Grade	Location	Type	Completed (Note: The date given is the date used by Historic England as significant for the initial building or that of an important part in the structure's description.)	Date designated	Grid ref. (Note: The grid reference is based on the British national grid reference system, sometimes known as OSGB36, used by the Ordnance Survey.) Geo-coordinates	Notes	Entry number (Note: The "List Entry Number" is a unique number assigned to each listed building and scheduled monument by Historic England.)	Image	Wikidata
Brames Hall	II				14 July 1988	TM1376067223; 52°15′42″N 1°07′51″E		1032221	Upload Photo	Q26283606
Model Cottage	II				14 July 1988	TM1234765680; 52°14′54″N 1°06′33″E		1032226	Upload Photo	Q26283611
Orchard Farmhouse	II				14 July 1988	TM1431065789; 52°14′55″N 1°08′17″E		1352495	Upload Photo	Q26635506
Wetheringsett Manor	II				5 April 2000	TM1293066971; 52°15′35″N 1°07′07″E		1380203	Upload Photo	Q26660416
Deerbolts Cottage	II	Blacksmith's Green			14 July 1988	TM1417765734; 52°14′53″N 1°08′10″E		1032224	Upload Photo	Q26283609
Meadow Farmhouse	II	Blacksmith's Green			14 July 1988	TM1419065943; 52°15′00″N 1°08′11″E		1032222	Upload Photo	Q26283607
The Cottage	II	Blacksmith's Green			14 July 1988	TM1416265854; 52°14′57″N 1°08′09″E		1032223	Upload Photo	Q26283608
The Forge	II	Blacksmith's Green			14 July 1988	TM1429065577; 52°14′48″N 1°08′15″E		1352496	Upload Photo	Q26635507
Shrublands	II	Brockford Green			29 July 1955	TM1235865544; 52°14′49″N 1°06′34″E		1032225	Upload Photo	Q26283610
The Homestead and Sunnyend Cottage	II	Brockford Green			14 July 1988	TM1225465553; 52°14′50″N 1°06′28″E		1182114	Upload Photo	Q26477389
Bridge House	II	Brockford Street			29 July 1955	TM1181366908; 52°15′34″N 1°06′08″E		1182165	Upload Photo	Q26477437
House 15 Metres West of Malthouse (occupied by Mr Rookyard)	II	Brockford Street			14 July 1988	TM1177866940; 52°15′35″N 1°06′06″E		1032231	Upload Photo	Q26283617
Malthouse	II	Brockford Street			29 July 1955	TM1179966937; 52°15′35″N 1°06′07″E		1032229	Upload Photo	Q26283615
Saddlers Cottage	II	Brockford Street			14 July 1988	TM1177466963; 52°15′36″N 1°06′06″E		1182234	Upload Photo	Q26477497
The Old Griffin	II	Brockford Street			14 July 1988	TM1179967000; 52°15′37″N 1°06′07″E		1032230	Upload Photo	Q26283616
Yew Tree Farmhouse	II	Brockford Street			14 July 1988	TM1180666960; 52°15′36″N 1°06′08″E		1182204	Upload Photo	Q26477469
1-4, Church Street	II	1-4, Church Street			14 July 1988	TM1270566743; 52°15′28″N 1°06′55″E		1352498	Upload Photo	Q26635509
Beech Cottage	II	Church Street			29 July 1955	TM1271666919; 52°15′33″N 1°06′56″E		1032233	Upload Photo	Q26283619
Church of All Saints	I	Church Street	church building		29 July 1955	TM1273266845; 52°15′31″N 1°06′56″E		1284593	Church of All Saints More images	Q17526361
K6 Telephone Kiosk South of Post Office	II	Church Street			15 February 1990	TM1268366851; 52°15′31″N 1°06′54″E		1032203	Upload Photo	Q26283587
Mill Cottage	II	Church Street			29 July 1955	TM1270066802; 52°15′30″N 1°06′54″E		1182324	Upload Photo	Q26477582
Post Office	II	Church Street			29 July 1955	TM1268566869; 52°15′32″N 1°06′54″E		1182252	Upload Photo	Q26477514
Rectory Cottage the Old Rectory	II	Church Street			29 July 1955	TM1277266838; 52°15′31″N 1°06′58″E		1032234	Upload Photo	Q26283620
The Old Forge	II	Church Street			29 July 1955	TM1267866835; 52°15′31″N 1°06′53″E		1352497	Upload Photo	Q26685463
Hill Farmhouse	II	Hockey Hill			9 August 1996	TM1271966150; 52°15′09″N 1°06′54″E		1268354	Upload Photo	Q26558667
Paxes House	II	Hockey Hill			14 July 1988	TM1271966216; 52°15′11″N 1°06′54″E		1032235	Upload Photo	Q26283621
Step House	II	Hockey Hill			14 July 1988	TM1268366646; 52°15′25″N 1°06′53″E		1284605	Upload Photo	Q26573359
Station House	II	Knaves Green, Brockford			14 July 1988	TM1252565885; 52°15′00″N 1°06′43″E		1182140	Upload Photo	Q26477413
North End, Low Barn Cottages South End, Low Barn Cottages	II	Low Barn Cottages, Pitman's Corner			3 May 1977	TM1418266729; 52°15′25″N 1°08′12″E		1182460	Upload Photo	Q26477708
The Old Forge	II	Mendlesham Road, Brockford			1 November 1977	TM1175066868; 52°15′33″N 1°06′05″E		1032227	Upload Photo	Q26283612
Turnpike Cottages	II	1 and 2, Norwich Road, Brockford			14 July 1988	TM1184366358; 52°15′17″N 1°06′08″E		1032228	Upload Photo	Q26283613
Seamans	II	Norwich Road, Brockford			14 July 1988	TM1186066113; 52°15′09″N 1°06′09″E		1182153	Upload Photo	Q26477425
Old Post Office	II	1 and 2, Old Post Office			14 July 1988	TM1257066732; 52°15′28″N 1°06′47″E		1352494	Upload Photo	Q26635505
Green Farmhouse	II	Page's Green			14 July 1988	TM1479365397; 52°14′41″N 1°08′41″E		1352499	Upload Photo	Q26635510
Greenway Cottage	II	Page's Green			14 July 1988	TM1454266161; 52°15′06″N 1°08′30″E		1032236	Upload Photo	Q26283622
Moore's Green Farmhouse	II	Page's Green			14 July 1988	TM1432366280; 52°15′11″N 1°08′19″E		1284581	Upload Photo	Q26573337
Page's Green House	II	Page's Green			14 July 1988	TM1464165641; 52°14′49″N 1°08′34″E		1182403	Upload Photo	Q26477653
Bloomfields Farmhouse	II	Park Green			14 July 1988	TM1366964260; 52°14′06″N 1°07′40″E		1352500	Upload Photo	Q26635511
Scotch Farmhouse	II	Park Green			14 July 1988	TM1369764432; 52°14′12″N 1°07′42″E		1182443	Upload Photo	Q26477691
Town Farmhouse	II	Park Green			14 July 1988	TM1346464604; 52°14′18″N 1°07′30″E		1032237	Upload Photo	Q26283623
Low Barn Cottages	II	Pitman's Corner			14 July 1988	TM1425066660; 52°15′23″N 1°08′16″E		1032238	Upload Photo	Q26283625
Broad Oak Farmhouse	II	Station Road			16 July 1999	TM1320765046; 52°14′32″N 1°07′17″E		1113303	Upload Photo	Q26407183
Hoods	II	Town Lane, Brockford			14 July 1988	TM1260664582; 52°14′18″N 1°06′45″E		1032232	Upload Photo	Q26283618
Moat House	II	Town Lane, Brockford			14 July 1988	TM1273864548; 52°14′17″N 1°06′51″E		1284645	Upload Photo	Q26573397
Wetheringsett War Memorial	II	Wetheringsett Cum Brockford, IP14 5NN	war memorial		18 September 2018	TM1269365950; 52°15′02″N 1°06′52″E		1458931	Wetheringsett War Memorial More images	Q66479898
Barn Immediately South West of Elm Farmhouse	II	Wetherup Street			14 July 1988	TM1424864110; 52°14′01″N 1°08′10″E		1352501	Upload Photo	Q26635512
Elm Farmhouse	II	Wetherup Street			29 July 1955	TM1425764129; 52°14′01″N 1°08′10″E		1182538	Upload Photo	Q26477783
House 30 Metres North East of the Cottage (occupied by Mr Rose)	II	Wetherup Street			14 July 1988	TM1423964208; 52°14′04″N 1°08′10″E		1032240	Upload Photo	Q26283628
Moat Farmhouse	II	Wetherup Street			14 July 1988	TM1405264054; 52°13′59″N 1°07′59″E		1032239	Upload Photo	Q26283627
Parkhall Farmhouse	II	Wetherup Street			14 July 1988	TM1389363974; 52°13′57″N 1°07′51″E		1182481	Upload Photo	Q26477727
Sycamore Farmhouse	II	Wetherup Street			14 July 1988	TM1450564295; 52°14′06″N 1°08′24″E		1352502	Upload Photo	Q26635513
The Cottage	II	Wetherup Street			14 July 1988	TM1420664190; 52°14′03″N 1°08′08″E		1284470	Upload Photo	Q26683416
Tudor House	II	Wetherup Street			14 July 1988	TM1443364257; 52°14′05″N 1°08′20″E		1284480	Upload Photo	Q26573243

== See also ==
- Grade I listed buildings in Suffolk
- Grade II* listed buildings in Suffolk

== Sources ==
- Bettely, James; Pevsner, Nikolaus (2015) [1961], Suffolk: West, The Buildings of England, New Haven and London: Yale University Press, ISBN 978-0-300-19655-9
