= MSLR =

MSLR may refer to:

- The Manchester, Sheffield and Lincolnshire Railway
- The Mid-Suffolk Light Railway
