= Brockford Street =

Hamlet in Suffolk, England

Coordinates: 52.260°N 1.102°E

- Location within Suffolk
- OS grid reference: TM115665
- Civil parish: Wetheringsett-cum-Brockford
- District: Mid Suffolk
- Shire county: Suffolk
- Region: East
- Country: England
- Sovereign state: United Kingdom
- Post town: Stowmarket
- Postcode district: IP14
- Police: Suffolk
- Fire: Suffolk
- Ambulance: East of England

Brockford Street is a hamlet in the civil parish of Wetheringsett-cum-Brockford, in the Mid Suffolk district, in the county of Suffolk, England, sited upon the A140 road between Ipswich and Norwich. Nearby is Brockford Station, part of The Mid-Suffolk Light Railway which closed under B.R. in 1952. The Mid-Suffolk Light Railway Museum is located at the site of the old cattle dock. Brockford was recorded in the Domesday Book of 1086 as Brocfort.

In 1086, the population of Brockford was recorded as 17, rising to 31 taxpayers by 1524. Between 1550 and 1599, Brockford had one carpenter, one yeoman, one weaver and one wheelwright. By 1647 there were 34 households. During 1600 and 1649, the hamlet had one carpenter, four yeomen and 2 husbandmen. From 1650 to 1699 this became 10 yeomen, one blacksmith, one cooper, one husbandman and even a physic physician. In 1844 the hamlet housed a grocer/draper, two carpenters, a shoemaker, beerhouse keeper, victualler, saddler and six farmers. In 1912 this had expanded to six farmers, a carpenter, three surgeons, a horse slaughterer, a blacksmith, carrier/carpenter, newsagent, shopkeeper, publican, saddler and a cattle dealer.

A church in Brockford is mentioned in Joceline de Brakelond's writings of 1198, but has since disappeared without a trace; even the dedication is unknown.

Brockford hosted a beerhouse along with the Griffin pub (still standing; Grade II listed early 16th century house, extended to the right in the 17th century and closed as the pub in the early 1960s) with a beer retailer added by 1891.

Other historic structures include three early 16th century timber framed cottages with underbuilt jetty (now a single house) [GV II]; Bridge House, an early to mid 16th century inn (and 17th-mid 19th century farmhouse) with roadside jetty [GV II]; Yew Tree Farmhouse, a mid 16th century former farmhouse with a 19th century façade [GV II]; a 16th to 17th century timber framed saddler's cottage with thatched roof [GV II]; a timber framed 17th century 2 cell house with an interior little altered since the 19th century [GV II] and a stretch of Roman Road.

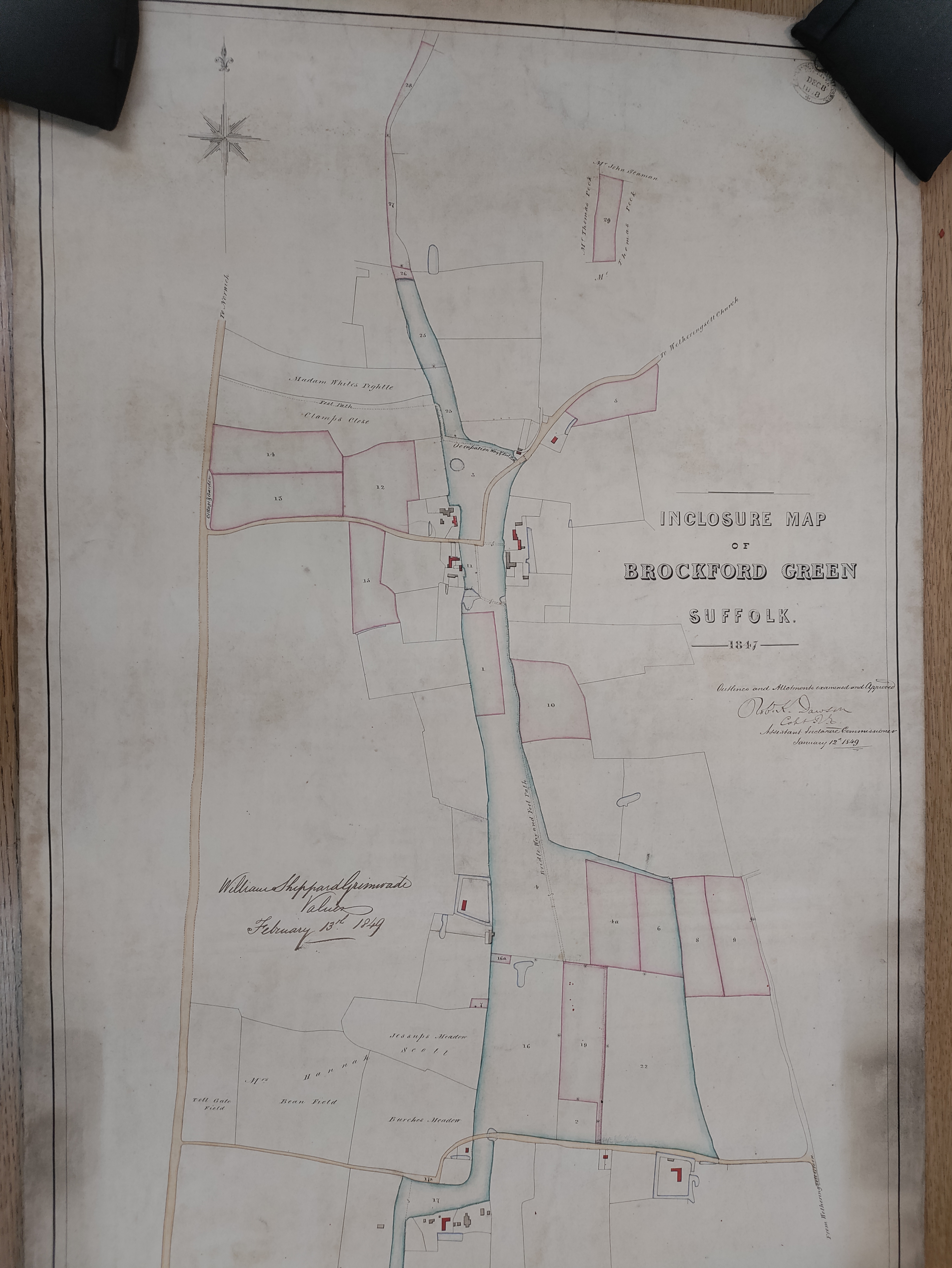
Enclosure Award and Map of Brockford Green, 1847
