= Brockford and Wetheringsett railway station =

Disused railway station in England

Coordinates: 52.250062°N 1.116371°E

Brockford and Wetheringsett
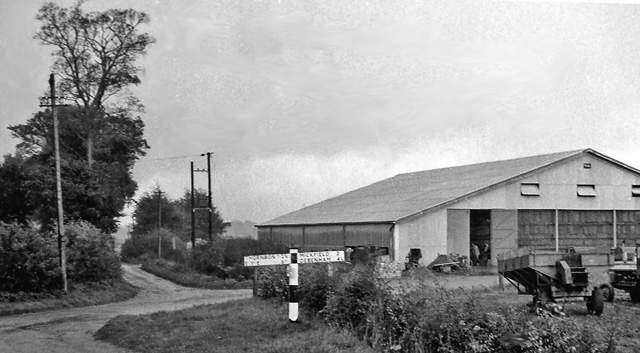
- Site of the station in 1966

General information
- Location: Wetheringsett, Mid Suffolk; England
- Grid reference: TM128658
- Platforms: 1

Other information
- Status: Disused

History
- Original company: Mid-Suffolk Light Railway
- Post-grouping: LNER and then British Railways

Key dates
- 29 September 1908: Station opens
- 28 July 1952: Station closes
Location

Brockford and Wetheringsett railway station was a station on the Mid-Suffolk Light Railway.

== History ==
Brockford and Wetheringsett railway station served the villages of Wetheringsett and Brockford Green in Suffolk. It was on the Mid-Suffolk Light Railway. The station was opened in 1908 and closed in 1952. The station was located six miles from Haughley and was made up of two small corrugated iron clad huts, one acting as booking office, staff room and store room and the other as passenger waiting room.

After the railway closed the station site was turned into an industrial site. When the Mid-Suffolk Light Railway Society began building up their collection, the site of the station's cattle dock was found and the original brickwork makes up part of a new platform at the station.

Former Services

Preceding station	Disused railways	Following station
Mendlesham	Mid-Suffolk Light Railway	Aspall and Thorndon
