= Aspall and Thorndon railway station =

Disused railway station in Aspall, Suffolk

Coordinates: 52.25349°N 1.17395°E

Aspall and Thorndon

General information
- Location: Aspall, Mid Suffolk; England
- Platforms: 1

Other information
- Status: Disused

History
- Original company: Mid-Suffolk Light Railway
- Pre-grouping: Mid-Suffolk Light Railway
- Post-grouping: London and North Eastern Railway; Eastern Region of British Railways

Key dates
- 29 September 1908: Station opens
- 28 July 1952: Station closes
Location

Aspall and Thorndon was a railway station on the Mid-Suffolk Light Railway. This station was located with Aspall to the south, Debenham 2 1/2 miles (4.0 km) further south and Thorndon 3 1/2 miles (5.6 km) to the north-west.

== History ==
Opened by the Mid-Suffolk Light Railway, Aspall station was located 8 miles (13 km) from Haughley and had a similar sized building to Mendlesham but the station was the only one on the line not to have an open-fronted waiting room.

Preceding station	Disused railways	Following station
Brockford and Wetheringsett	Mid-Suffolk Light Railway	Kenton
