= Love on a Branch Line (novel) =

1959 novel by John Hadfield

- Author: John Hadfield
- Language: English
- Publisher: Hutchinson
- Publication date: 1959
- Publication place: United Kingdom
- Pages: 290
- OCLC: 559417756
- LC Class: PR6015.A23 L8

Love on a Branch Line is a 1959 comic novel by John Hadfield. The novel tells the story of a diffident member of the British Civil Service, Jasper Pye, who is sent to East Anglia to close a government department headquartered at a country estate. During the weekend he spends at the estate, he meets the people of the area and develops an affection for them and their home. The setting is loosely based on the Mid-Suffolk Light Railway between Haughley and Laxfield, which closed in 1952, the year Hadfield moved to Suffolk.

The book was critically acclaimed and sold very well. It was adapted for a 1994 BBC television series, Love on a Branch Line, starring Michael Maloney as Jasper Pye and Leslie Phillips as Lord Flamborough.

== Plot summary ==
=== Tuesday ===
The action of the novel begins on Tuesday, 4 June 1957. Jasper Pye, a civil servant for nine years in an unnamed ministry, takes the Piccadilly line from Barons Court to Green Park. Whilst on the train, he recounts a party in Chelsea he attended the previous evening, where he overheard the woman he had been pursuing, Dierdre, say "yes I know; Jasper is a bore." Pye explains that the remark has provoked him to resign his position in the Civil Service and move to Paris to paint. After exiting the tube, Pye walks to his office to meet his boss, Mark Fairweather, and announces his intention to resign. Fairweather ignores Pye's wishes and asks if Pye would like a special job to visit and report on a remote division, and to recommend to close it. The unit, called the "Department of Output Statistics", is located on the border of Norfolk and Suffolk in a country house, Arcady Hall, owned by the Earl of Flamborough. The unit had been established in 1940 during the Battle of Britain when the ministry requisitioned the Earl's house, and has largely been ignored since the War. Reluctantly, Pye agrees to take on the job and to leave the next day.

=== Wednesday ===
Pye takes the train, presumably on the Great Eastern Main Line from Liverpool Street station, to Arcady. During the trip he meets a lady named Miss Tidy who knows the Flamborough family. Miss Tidy explains how the Earl lost his legs while operating a locomotive during the 1926 general strike, and that the Earl and his wife Mabel have three daughters: Chloe, Belinda, and Matilda. Pye detrains at a station called Flaxfield Junction (based on Haughley Junction), as the branch line from there to Arcady station (based on Laxfield station) closed four years earlier. When he arrives in Arcady that evening, Pye visits the Virley Arms, where he meets the landlord Percy Pott as well as Chloe Flamborough's alcoholic husband and heir to Arcady Hall, Lionel Virley. After the pub closes, Pye visits the village church and then goes to see Arcady Hall from the outside, before retiring to the Virley Arms for the night.

=== Thursday ===
Mid-morning, Pye sets out for Arcady Hall. When he arrives he meets the free-spirited Belinda Flamborough, who gives him a long kiss. Pye then meets Lady Mabel, who takes him to see the ruined chapel in the woods. At the chapel they find the youngest daughter, Matilda. Mabel finally takes Pye to the abandoned Arcady railway station, where he meets the Earl of Flamborough aboard the private railway car where he lives. After a circular trip on the train, driven by Chloe Flamborough, they arrive back at Arcady. At the hall, Pye then meets the department's staff: Professor Duncan McAllister Pollux, the archivist Quirk, and secretary Miss Mounsey, nicknamed "the Mouse." After tea, Quirk recruits Pye for the next day's cricket match between Arcady and Flaxfield, and they go to hit at a practice field. Pye hits a ball into the bush, and while looking for it, is spoken to by Matilda, who hides in a tree. Following dinner, Pye goes with the professor to Lord Flamborough's railway carriage, where a group plans the programme for Monday's Fête in aid of the Fund for Fallen Women. During the meeting Lionel gets drunk, and later, Pye helps Chloe put him to sleep. Later, Pye finds Chloe crying in the cellar and helps comfort her.

While going to sleep that evening, someone shoots an arrow into Pye's room with the message "come to me at midnight in Sir Almeric's room." Pye wanders the house looking for the room, and accidentally ends up on the roof, where he finds the Professor. The Professor shows Pye to Sir Almeric's room, where they find a longbow that was on loan to the Victoria and Albert Museum, but that went missing. Pye hears a feminine laugh beyond the room.

=== Friday ===
Pye awakes and has breakfast alone before talking a while with Miss Mounsey. After breakfast he walks the grounds and sees a peacock, and rushes to get his easel and paints. The peacock walks away, and in lieu of painting him, Belinda offers to model nude for Pye. He paints her topless instead, before she flees the house to avoid being seen by the Professor, who is giving Miss Tidy a tour. Pye then takes lunch at the Virley Arms before getting a bus to Flaxfield, where he spends the afternoon. That evening he finds a message telling him to meet in the chapel ruins at twilight. At the chapel Pye finds Matilda sitting atop one of the walls. Pye scales the wall to meet her and in the process destroys the vines to reach it. Later they are found by the professor, who brings a ladder to help them down.

=== Saturday ===
During the morning Pye spends most of his time listening to jazz with Lord Flamborough. At noon he changes into his cricket clothes and leaves to meet the team at the Virley Arms for lunch. However, before leaving the house, he meets Lionel, who offers Pye a drink of gin before the match. The two then end up trapped in the cellar and get drunk. They manage to get out eventually and walk to the village green in Arcady. During the cricket match Pye is concussed, but goes on to hit the winning run. The group has a celebratory party at the Virley Arms and during the party Pye and Belinda arrange to meet the next day at 3 o'clock at the lake. When they arrive home, Chloe invites Pye into her living room, and as she is upset over Lionel's staying the night in Flaxfield with a mistress, Pye speaks comfortingly to her and kisses her.

=== Sunday ===
Pye awakes Sunday morning in his own bedroom by Miss Mounsey, who brings him breakfast. After breakfast, Pye helps Lady Flamborough and the Professor with the garden, and then takes a trip to the Virley Arms with Jones. When he returns to Arcady Hall he visits Chloe and they discuss the previous night. She tells him they cannot love each other. After lunch with the Professor, Pye walks to the lake to meet Belinda. Unable to find her, Pye undresses and swims to an island with a rotunda on it. At the rotunda he finds Belinda lying naked in the sun. He and she go for a swim in the lake and then have sex on the bank. That evening, they walk from the lake to Lord Flamborough's train, where they go for a ride with several others. After he falls asleep that evening, Matilda climbs down the chimney in his room and wakes him. Matilda tells him she thought he would want to sleep with her, and after he tells her no, she leaves for the night.

=== Whit Monday ===
The morning of Whit Monday Pye breakfasts with the Professor, Quirk, and the Mouse where they talk about the coming events of the day. At the end of the meal, the Mouse brings Pye a letter from Mark Fairweather. In the letter, Fairweather explains that on Friday afternoon, the treasury announced its snap decision to close Output Statistics without receiving Pye's report. Pye lets the Mouse read the letter, then finds the Professor and Quirk and gives them the news. When Pye and Quirk are alone, Quirk explains that the Professor was not actually a professor, only having worked in the bursar's office at Aberdeen University for a term, and will not have anywhere to go once the department is closed. Pye then packs his bags and delivers them to the station at Flaxfield, where he plans to leave on the 6:48 pm train. At Flaxfield, Pye joins Lord Flamborough in his railway carriage and tells him that the unit will be shut down. While Lord Flamborough and the hired band listen to music in the carriage, Pye helps Chloe drive the train to Arcady. Upon arrival in Arcady, Pye goes to the village green where the fête is underway. He is then summoned to judge the ankle competition and play in Tip-the-Topper. After the Traction Engine Musical Chairs, Pye helps Lord Flamborough present the prizes for the day. During the presentations, Miss Tidy comes to the daïs to speak to the crowd. She explains that she is employed by the Ministry of Works and has been searching for a site for a new Atomic Research Station, and that Arcady has been chosen. When the station opens, Quirk will become the groundsman.

Pye sneaks away from the fête before heading to Flaxfield station. He comes across Matilda and after speaking for a while, bids her goodbye. He then meets Lady Mabel, who tells him that the Professor will stay on as the gardener. As Pye leaves the estate, the Mouse comes to him with his hat, briefcase, and umbrella and tells him she is also leaving. As the two wait for the bus to Flaxfield, Pye tells her that he no longer intends to go to Paris and that he has realised he is only a civil servant. He then says that he is "also a bore," to which the Mouse replies "I don't find you a bore. Far from it." Pye then asks, "you really don't find me a bore," to which she shakes her head and then weeps quietly on his shoulder. While they stand waiting in the rain, Pye opens his umbrella over them.

== Reception ==
In The Times, a reviewer called the novel "light, fantastic, and amusing," and said "its plot might have been used as a script for one of the earlier Ealing film comedies."

== Adaptations ==
In 1993, BBC Radio 4 aired an abridged reading of the novel by Michael Cochrane.

The following year, BBC One turned the novel into the four-part miniseries Love on a Branch Line that aired in June and July of that year. The series starred Michael Maloney as Jasper Pye.
