= Haughley railway station =

Disused railway station in Suffolk, England

Coordinates: 52.2216°N 0.9874°E

Haughley
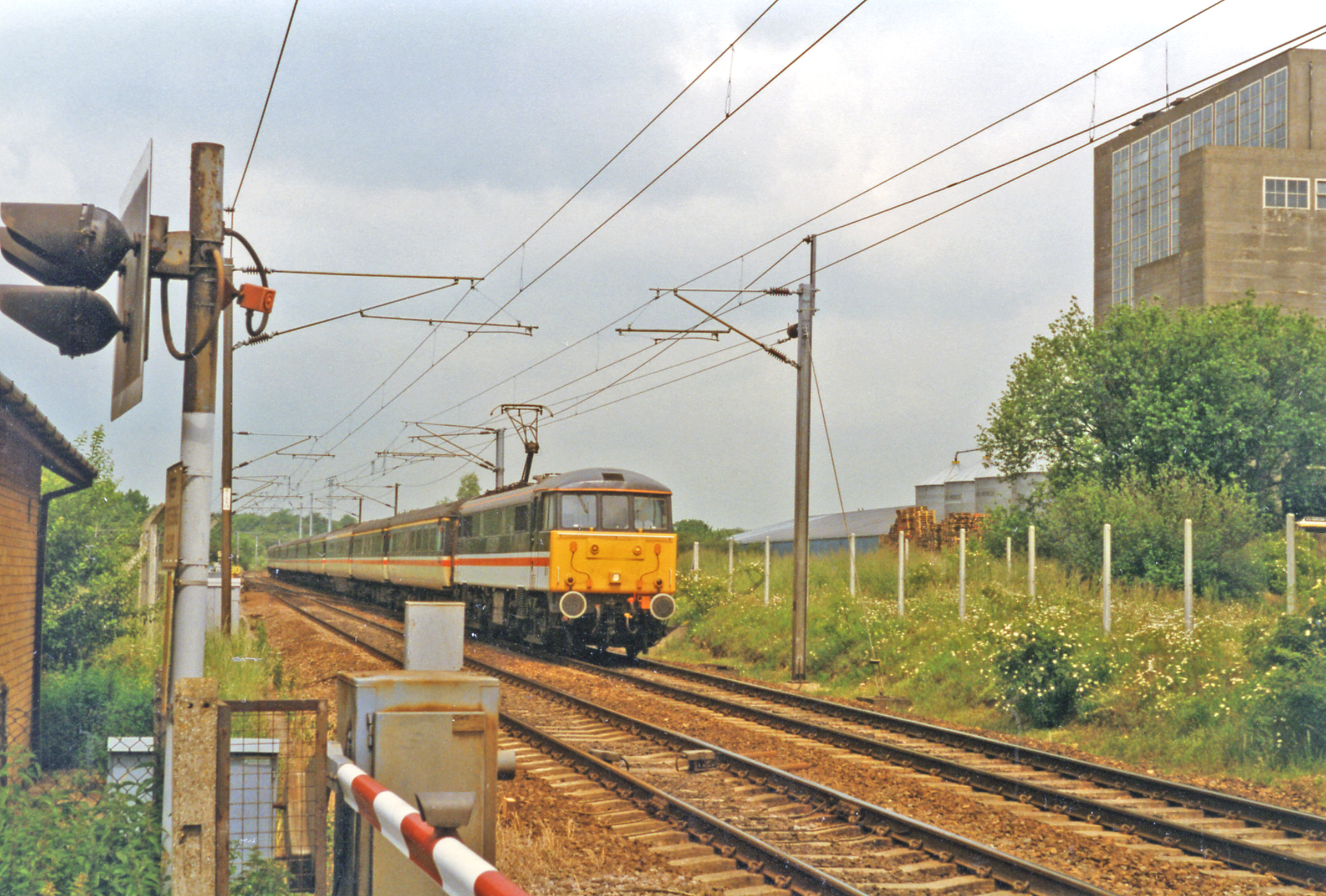
- The site of the station in 1997

General information
- Location: Haughley, District of Mid Suffolk; England
- Platforms: 4

Other information
- Status: Disused

History
- Original company: Eastern Union Railway
- Pre-grouping: Great Eastern Railway
- Post-grouping: LNER

Key dates
- 2 July 1849: Opened as Haughley Junction
- 1866: Renamed Haughley Road
- 1890: Renamed Haughley
- 1 July 1923: Renamed Haughley West
- September 1932: Renamed Haughley
- 2 January 1967: Closed
Location

Haughley railway station was located in Haughley, Suffolk on the Great Eastern Main Line between Liverpool Street Station and Norwich. It opened on 2 July 1849 named Haughley Junction and was a replacement for a station named Haughley Road which had been in service from 1846 to 1849 at location TM 02981 63319 on the line to Elmswell.

Haughley railway station also served two other lines, the line to Bury St Edmunds, Cambridge and Ely and the Mid-Suffolk Light Railway. Originally the Mid-Suffolk Light Railway's operation was confined to an adjacent but separate terminus, but it was closed in 1939 when all services were diverted to the main line station.

Haughley closed with effect from 2 January 1967 as part of the Beeching Axe and most of the station building was demolished as well as the three platforms and the two signalboxes, the turntable filled in and the sidings removed. By 2016 only the stationmaster's house remains.

== History ==
=== Opening (1849-1862) ===
The first line to Haughley was built by the Ipswich and Bury Railway (which later became part of the Eastern Union Railway (EUR), opening to passengers Bury St Edmunds and Ipswich on 9 December 1846. This line served the original Haughley Road station which opened on 7 December 1846, although passenger services did not commence until 24 December 1846 following late receipt of the Board of Trade operating certificate.

With the opening of the EUR line towards Norwich (initially as far as Burston) on 2 July 1849 a new station called Haughley was opened (with Haughley Road closing a week later) just east of the junction so it could be served by trains on both routes. Before the line from Bury to Cambridge was opened the line was largely worked as a branch, with passenger trains using a bay platform at the station.

In 1854 the EUR was taken over by the Eastern Counties Railway (ECR) who became responsible for the operation of the station. However, by the 1860s the railways in East Anglia were in financial trouble and most were leased to the ECR; they wished to amalgamate formally, but could not obtain government agreement for this until 1862, when the Great Eastern Railway was formed by amalgamation. Haughley thus became a GER station in 1862.

=== Great Eastern Railway (1862-1922) ===
In 1866 the station was renamed Haughley Road by the GER and it was about this time that the station buildings were constructed. Having spent this money it is also worth noting that the GER board considered closure as receipts were low (the village of 828 souls being located three-quarters of a mile (1.2 km) from the village meant receipts were never going to be high).

On 28 December 1874 there was an accident at Haughley Road (as the station was then named).

In 1890 the stations name was once again changed to Haughley. Two years later on 7 September 1892 there was another accident at the station when a train derailed.

In 1904 the Mid Suffolk Light Railway (MSLR) opened as an independently run line to Laxfield. Opening to light goods (the line served a predominantly agricultural area) it was felt there was enough potential for passenger traffic, which commenced on 29 September 1908. This used a separate single-platformed terminus station to the east of the main line station.

On 1 January 1923 the GER amalgamated with several other railways to create the London & North Eastern Railway.

=== LNER (1923-1947) ===
The MSLR did not become part of the LNER at the grouping as the LNER was reluctant to take over the light railway's debts. A deal was done and in 1924 the MSLR became part of the LNER and soon after the LNER named the main line station Haughley East and the MSLR terminus Haughley West.

In 1929 the Travelling Post Office service that had terminated at Ipswich was extended to Norwich with a stop at Haughley. A second TPO service ran from King's Lynn via March and Ely to connect at Haughley. By 1948 this service ran to and from Peterborough East. All this activity took place in the early hours of the morning.

In 1932 LNER renamed the combined station Haughley.

In 1939 the former MSLR terminus station was converted to a petrol depot (serving this role until 1944) and trains from the Mid-Suffolk line were routed to a bay platform at the main Haughley station.

After World War 2 a rail-served grain dryer was built at Haughley.

=== British Railways (1948-1967) ===
The nationalisation of Britain's railways saw the operation of Haughley station pass to British Railways Eastern Region. The loss making Mid-Suffolk line was closed on 26 July 1952.

The bay platform was closed in 1960 and the track lifted the same year. The turntable was also removed c1960 and the pit filled in and adjacent sidings removed.

The goods yard was closed on 28 December 1964 and the MSLR sidings were lifted c1965.

The Ipswich to Norwich stopping service was withdrawn on 5 November 1966 leaving the station served by the stopping Ipswich - Cambridge service. The parcels service was also withdrawn on this date.

Haughley closed with effect from 2 January 1967 as part of the Beeching Axe and most of the station building was demolished as well as the three platforms.

=== After closure ===
On the evening of 13 March 1971, D1562 (a Class 47 locomotive with an experimentally uprated power plant) hauled the 19:30 Liverpool Street to Norwich train. Near Haughley Junction an explosion occurred in the engine room, followed by a fire. The force of the explosion blew the engine room door off its hinges, striking driver Harry Hendry and breaking his arm.

On 16 May 1971 Haughley Junction was re-laid as single lead junction.

On 22 June 1982 another accident happened at Haughley Junction. During the early hours when the 01:01 Ipswich to Peterborough train, hauled by a Class 31 locomotive, was alleged (at the time) to have over-run the signal protecting the junction at Haughley and struck the 23.20 Peterborough - Ipswich Postal service. Some photographs of the aftermath can be found here:

The line to Norwich was electrified by British Rail in 1985 with electric services commencing the following year.

== Description ==
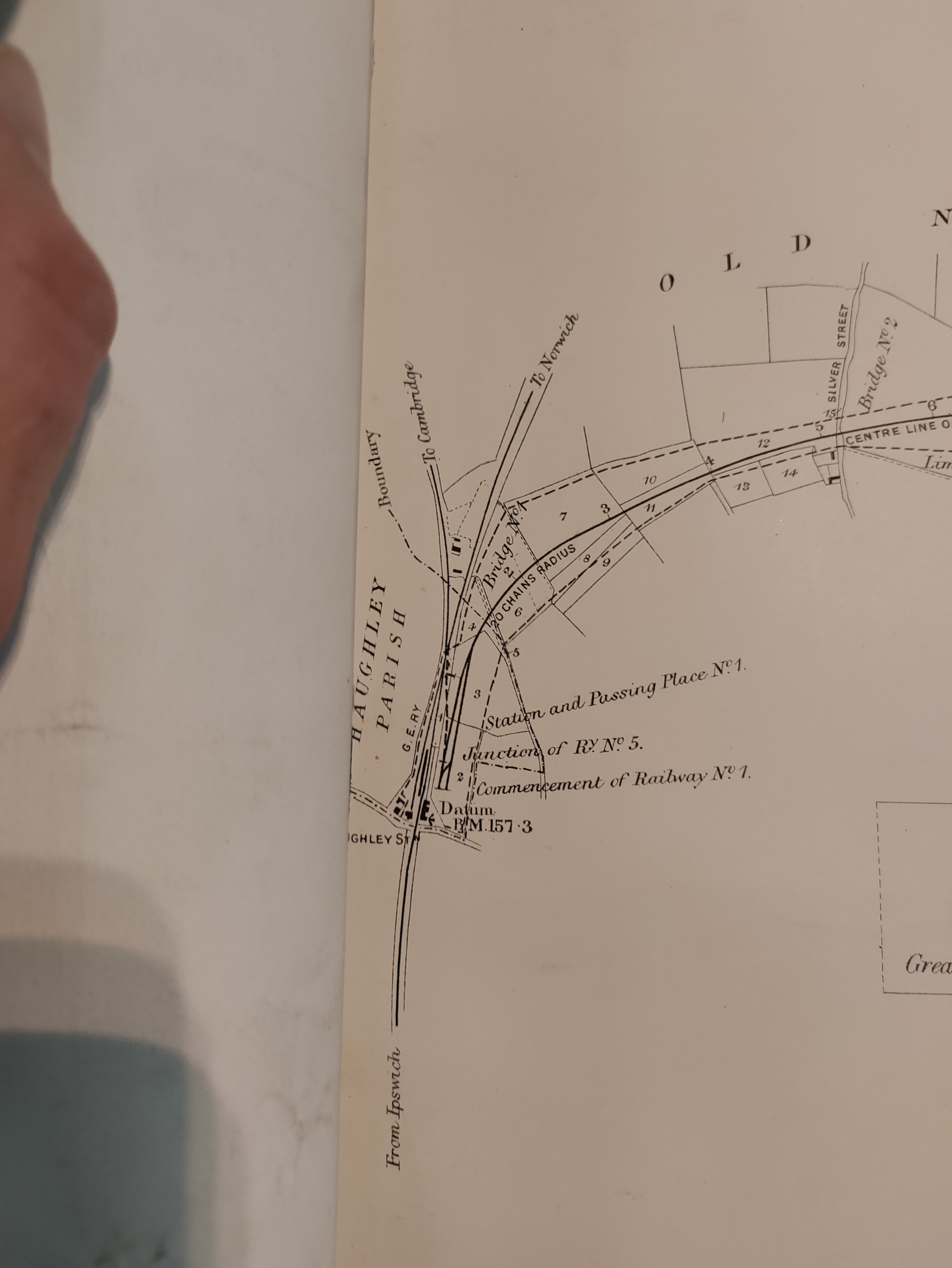
Station plans during the construction of the Mid-Suffolk Light Railway, May 1899.

The station was situated 82 miles 75 chains (133.5 km) from London Liverpool Street and consisted of an up platform (420 feet (130 m)) with a bay platform and a down island platform (430 feet (130 m)). These were linked by a footbridge (the original wooden one being replaced by a metal one in 1910).

It is possible that, like Finningham to the north, the cash-strapped Eastern Union Railway took the view in 1849 that better facilities would follow should the station prove popular as the original structure (designed by Frederick Barnes who designed a number of the local railway stations) was replaced by the GER between 1864 and 1866.

The new facilities included an ornate entrance, booking and parcels offices, waiting room, ladies waiting room, gentlemen's toilets, a porters' room and a station house. The station was part covered by an awning 240 feet (73 m) in length.

A waiting room on the down island platform was provided in 1887 which also had a gentlemen's urinal.

Initially a goods shed and 42 foot (13 m) diameter turntable were provided at Haughley, located on the down side. On the up side, a number of sidings existed east of the station facilitating the exchange of traffic between the MSLR and the GER.

By 2014 only the stationmaster's house remains.

== Signal Boxes ==
According to GER minutes signals were first approved for the Haughley area in March 1875. By 1893 two signal boxes were controlling the Haughley area. Below is an overview of the area's signalling history.

Signal Box Name	Dates open	Remarks
Haughley	1893-1933	
Haughley Station	1933-1971	In 1921 had 21 levers controlling level crossing and signals at south end of station
Haughley Junction	1933-1971	in 1921 had 30 levers controlling junction, north end signals and connections to MSLR
Haughley	1971-1985	Panel in former waiting room
Colchester PSB	1985–present	Signals controlled by Colchester Power Signal Box

Preceding station	Disused railways	Following station
Finningham	Great Eastern Railway; Main Line	Stowmarket
Elmswell	Great Eastern Railway	Stowmarket
Terminus	Mid-Suffolk Light Railway; Laxfield Branch	Mendlesham
