= Charles Merton =

New Zealand bootmaker, teacher, musician and farmer

Charles Merton (1821–31 December 1885) was a notable New Zealand bootmaker, teacher, musician and farmer. He was born in Haughley, Suffolk, England in about 1821.
