= Wetheringsett-cum-Brockford =

Civil parish in Suffolk, England

Coordinates: 52.25°N 1.12°E

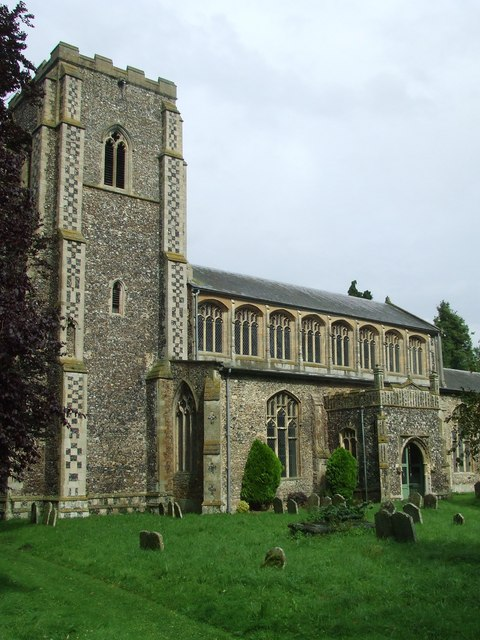
- All Saints’ Church, Wetheringsett

- Location within Suffolk
- Population: 670
- District: Mid Suffolk
- Shire county: Suffolk
- Region: East
- Country: England
- Sovereign state: United Kingdom
- Post town: Stowmarket
- Postcode district: IP14
- Police: Suffolk
- Fire: Suffolk
- Ambulance: East of England
- UK Parliament: Central Suffolk and North Ipswich

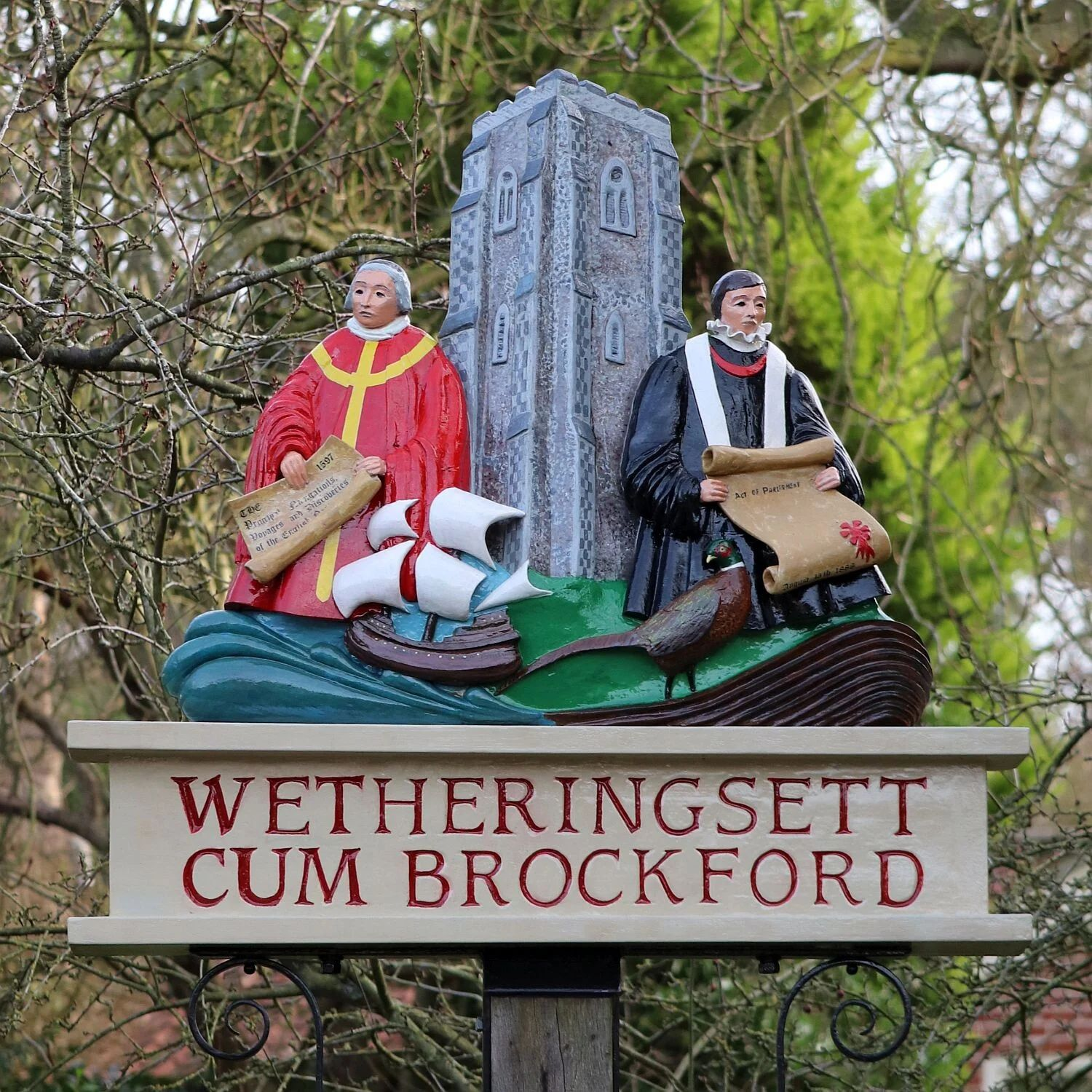
Wetheringsett’s colourful Village Sign

Wetheringsett-cum-Brockford is a civil parish in the Mid Suffolk district of Suffolk in eastern England. The parish contains the village of Wetheringsett, together with the hamlets of Blacksmith's Green, Broad Green, Brockford Street (located on the A140), Brockford Green, Knaves Green, Page's Green, Park Green, Pitman's Corner, Wetherup Street and White Horse Corner. In the 2011 census, the population was 669. Wetheringsett-cum-Brockford is home to All Saints’ Church and the Wetheringsett Church of England Voluntary-Controlled Primary School. The parish also contains 55 listed buildings.

== History ==
In 1870–72, John Marius Wilson described Wetheringsett as:

"...a parish, with W. village and Brockford hamlet, in Hartismere district, Suffolk; 5 miles SSW of Eye r. station. It has a post-office under Stonham. Acres, 3,783. Real property, £6,986. Pop., 1,072. Houses, 231. The property is subdivided. W. House is the seat of H. Brooke, Esq. The living is a rectory in the diocese of Norwich. Value, £714.* Patron, the Rev. J. P. Sill. The church is good. There are a parochial school, and townlands and charities £118."

In Old English, the name 'Wetheringsett-cum-Brockford' historically translates to 'fold of the people of Wetherden' and Brockford can also translate to either 'badger ford' or 'brook ford'. A 'brook' is defined as a small stream and a 'ford' is a shallow crossing in a river.

Wetheringsett-cum-Brockford is featured in the Domesday Book of 1086 5 times. In one particular entry, Wetheringsett is in the Hartismere hundred of Suffolk. The entry stated 48 households and mentioned resources including 4 acres of meadow, 1 church and woodland. As well as this, the entry consisted of 10 villages, 9 smallholders, 2 slaves and 4 freemen.

== Population ==
The population of Wetheringsett-cum-Brockford was at 851 in 1801 and then rose to a peak of 1,101 in 1851. After 1851, the population steadily decreased to 669 in 2011. However, there was a peak in the population decline in 1911 with a population of 822, and in 1951 with a population of 665.

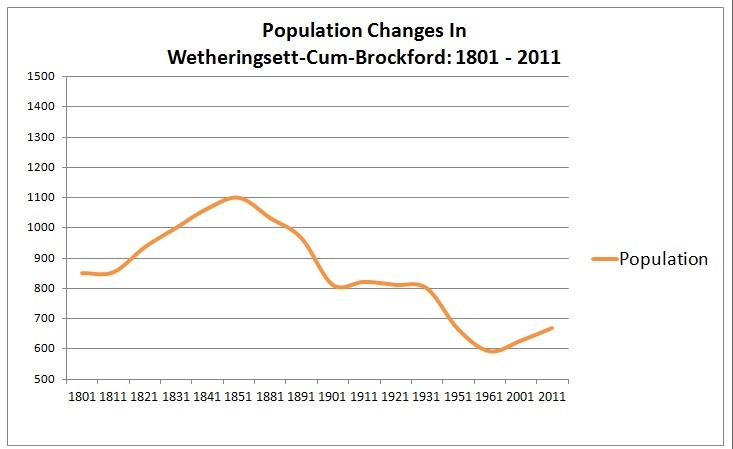
Population Change from 1801–2011

== Occupations ==
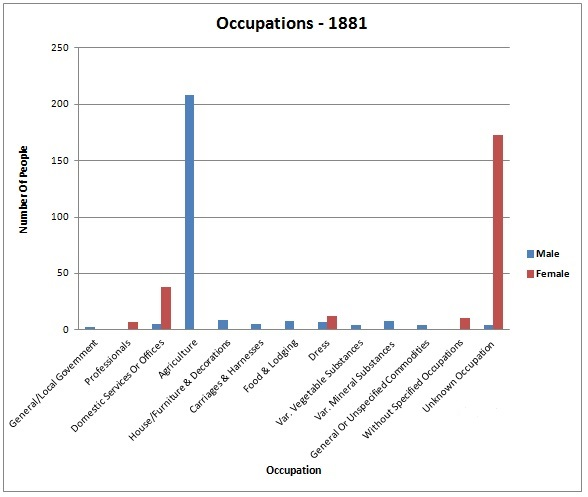
Occupations in 1881

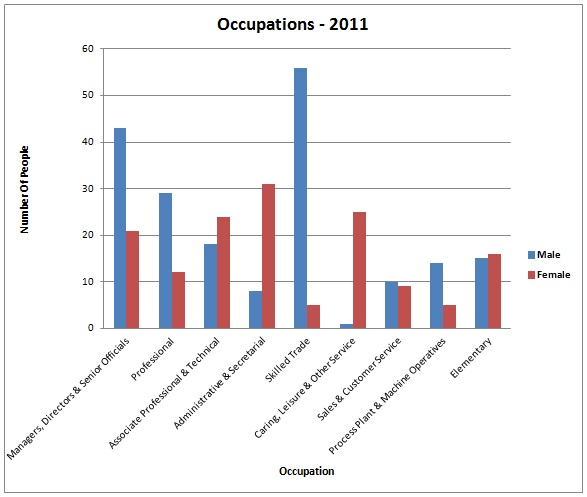
Occupations in 2011

The occupations census data for 1881 in Wetheringsett-cum-Brockford gave 9 categories. In 1881, the total number of people with occupations was 509 and the most popular occupation was 'Agriculture'. 266 of the total working population were male and 243 were female. This working population was less than half of the total population of Wetheringsett-cum-Brockford at the time. The most popular occupation for males at this time, was 'Agriculture', with 208 males being employed. The least popular occupation for males was the 'Professionals' sector, with 1 male to 7 females. The majority of females came under the category of 'Unknown Occupation', indicating they may have been unemployed, along with 4 males. The second most popular occupation for females was 'Domestic Services Or Offices' with a total of 38. Aside from these two occupations, the number of females employed in any other occupation did not reach above 12.

The census data for occupations in 2011 differs massively to the data from 1881. Although there are still 9 categories, the type of occupation contrasts to 1881 and reflects the changes in technology and equal rights. The total number of people working was 342, just over half of the total population of Wetheringsett-cum-Brockford in 2011. Overall, the most popular occupations were 'Managers, Directors & Senior Officials' and 'Skilled Trades'. The highest number of males in employment were allocated in the 'Skilled Trades' occupation, with a total of 56, with this also being the least popular occupation for females. The least popular occupation for males in 2011, was the 'Caring, Leisure & Other Service' occupation, with only one male in employment. However, the 'Caring, Leisure & Other Services' occupation received the second highest number of female workers with a total of 25. The most popular occupation for females was 'Administrative & Secretarial' with a total of 31.

== Housing ==
Between 1841 and 1961, the amount of residences in Wetheringsett-cum-Brockford peaked at 236 in 1881. In contrast, in 1921, the amount of residences reached its lowest of only 181. However, in 1881, the number of residences was 216, but 20 of these residences were vacant, which was not seen in any other year between 1841 and 1961. In 2011, the amount of residences rose further to 280 and the amount of households with at least one resident was 263.

Currently, the average house price for a detached house in Wetheringsett-cum-Brockford is £440,000. The average price for a terraced house is £145,000.

== Transport and education ==
Wetheringsett-cum-Brockford does not have its own railway station. Brockford was home to the Mid-Suffolk Light Railway, however this closed down in 1952. The closest railway stations to Wetheringsett-cum-Brockford are in the surrounding areas of Stowmarket, Needham Market and Diss, with Stowmarket Railway Station being the closest.

Wetheringsett-cum-Brockford is home to one primary school, the Wetheringsett Church of England Voluntary Controlled Primary School. The school has 80 pupils, aged 4 through to 11, and is situated on Church Street, next to the All Saints Church. In the 2012 Ofsted inspection, the school received a 'Good'. In 2018 the school now has 42 students and got a 'requires improvement' on there off stead report

Mendlesham Primary School is a school within 3 miles of Wetheringsett-cum-Brockford. This school has 70 pupils and received a 'Good with Outstanding Features' in its recent Ofsted inspection.

== Places of interest ==
Wetheringsett-cum-Brockford has one place of worship, namely All Saints’ Church. This church was almost all rebuilt in the 15th century and the surrounding cemetery features headstones dating back to the 18th century. All Saints’ Church also contains one war memorial.

Brockford also is home to the Mid-Suffolk Light Railway Museum. The original railway was built during the Edwardian era and the Light Railways Act 1896 (59 & 60 Vict. c. 48), allowed for the creation of the Mid-Suffolk Light Railway. The London & North Eastern Railway was introduced in 1923 and the Mid-Suffolk Light Railway Museum became part of this line a year after. However, after World War Two, the increase in road use led to the disuse of the railway. The only usage came from students travelling to and from secondary school. The railway officially closed in 1952 and in 1990, a group of volunteers created the Mid-Suffolk Light Railway Museum. The Museum is a Suffolk tourist attraction and includes photographs, artefacts and rolling stock. The Old Post Office and attached Waveney cottage, Grade II Listed, is mentioned in Hugh Lander's 'English Cottage Interiors' as being a good example of Suffolk's heritage. The Post Office was bought by the Smith family in the early 20th century and has changed very little since that time.
