= Haughley =

Village in Suffolk, England

Coordinates: 52.221°N 0.968°E

- Location within Suffolk
- Population: 1,638 (2011 Census)
- District: Mid Suffolk
- Shire county: Suffolk
- Region: East
- Country: England
- Sovereign state: United Kingdom
- Post town: STOWMARKET
- Postcode district: IP14
- Dialling code: 01449
- UK Parliament: Bury St Edmunds and Stowmarket

Haughley (/ˈhɔːli/ HAW-lee) is a village and civil parish in the Mid Suffolk district of Suffolk, England. The village is located 2 miles (3.2 km) northwest of the town of Stowmarket, overlooking the Gipping valley, next to the A14 corridor. The population recorded in 2011 was 1,638. Mentioned in the Domesday Book, it was the site of a castle, a church on the pilgrim's route to Bury St Edmunds Abbey, and a market. Adjacent farms on the north side of the village were also home to one of the first studies of organic farming and the first headquarters of the Soil Association.

== History ==
The village has evidence of Neolithic, pagan, Iron Age, Roman and Saxon settlements and was first mentioned (as Hag'e'le) in the will of Leofgifu, a Saxon noblewoman, in 1040. Leofgifu bequeathed Haughley to her only daughter who may eventually have become the wife of Guthmund, the holder of Haughley in 1066 (Guthmund was the brother of Wulfric, 'a kinsman' of Edward the Confessor, appointed Bishop of Ely c. 1052-63). Haughley is mentioned in the Domesday Survey of 1086 as Hagala being held by Hugh de Montfort, having formerly been held by the Saxon lord Guthmund for Edward.

A medieval market town and site of a royal fortress, Haughley prospered till the Tudor period then went into decline further compounded by a fire started on 11 April 1709 at which it is said “like a phoenix Stowmarket rose from its ashes”.

The parish anciently divided into the four divisions of Haughley Green, Old Street, New Street and Tothill. The original 120 acres (49 ha) of Haughley Green, north of the main village, were enclosed in 1854, after being bisected by the railway from Ipswich to Bury St Edmunds which opened in 1846.

Through the Victorian period to the present day the village has grown and was connected to water and sewerage with the addition of local authority housing at the instigation of the infamous and controversial Rev Walter Grainge White in the 1920s following the description of Haughley and its open sewers by the Daily Mail in 1928 as “the fever pit of the kingdom”.

In 2022, to commemorate Platinum Jubilee of Elizabeth II, a beacon was erected on the former Market Place and Village Green, attended by over one thousand people.

== Buildings ==
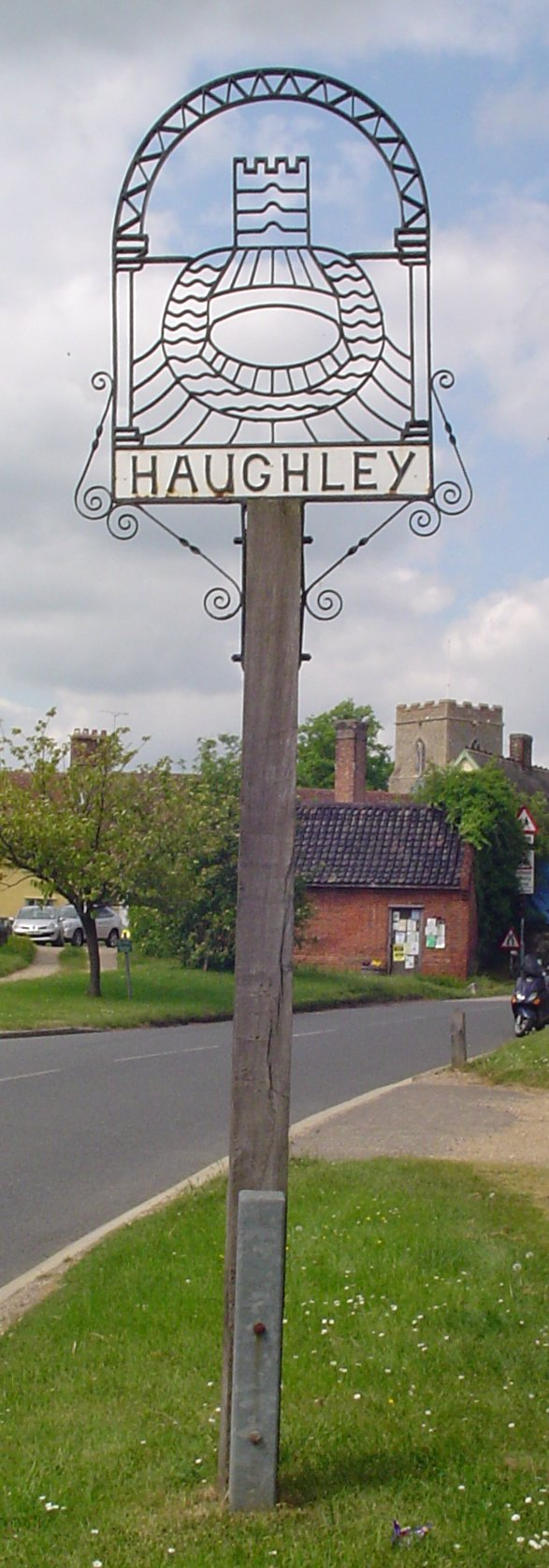
Village sign in Haughley, depicting Haughley Castle

=== Castle ===
Haughley Castle is considered one of the best-preserved motte and bailey earthworks in Suffolk. The castle was built by Hugh de Montfort following the conquest of 1066 over the previous footprint of the fortified hall of the Saxon lord Guthmund, killed at the Battle of Hastings.

King Henry II entrusted the castle to Ranulf de Broc (who had a part in the murder of Thomas Becket). In the Revolt of 1173–74 by Henry II's sons against their father, Robert de Beaumont, the Earl of Leicester, captured the castle for the rebels and demolished it in October 1173, following a short and fierce battle, by smoking the occupants out of the keep by piling brushwood against the building. The dead were buried in a mass grave to the east of the castle site. However it was subsequently partially rebuilt, and was granted by Richard I to his niece Matilda of Saxony who had married Geoffrey of Perche in 1189. King Edward II spent some days at Haughley in January 1326 during a journey to Bury St Edmunds, South Elmham and Norwich. During the later 1300s it was occupied by Robert d'Ufford, 1st Earl of Suffolk (granted the Manor in 1337) before falling into disuse in the 15th century when the De La Poles built Wingfield Castle. Haughley Park mansion was built in the early 17th century in what was then royal hunting park of the Castle.

The castle motte is 210 feet (64 m) wide at the base and 80 feet (24 m) tall. The bailey is rectangular, 390 feet (120 m) by 300 feet (91 m) across, with the entrance on the west side. The outer bailey exists in earthworks around the village called The Folly which are part of the prehistoric and Iron Age statements of the village. During an archaeological investigation in October 2010-March 2011 and February–April 2012, carved stone and other masonry were recovered from the Keep. Three Cedar of Lebanon trees (planted by Richard Ray in the 18th century when he "inexplicably" cleared the site) now sit atop the keep forming a landmark. In 2023 the village commemorated the 850th anniversary of the four-day siege with a Medieval Fair, Pageant and Beacon Lighting; events will culminate with a book launch and medieval banquet in October 2023.

=== Church ===
Haughley Parish Church (a Grade I listed building) is an example of an early English medieval Church on the site of a Saxon and Norman chapel mentioned in the Domesday Book of 1086. It is dedicated to the "Assumption of the Virgin Mary" and a fair was held annually in August to celebrate this until its abolition in 1871. The tower was built in the early 13th century by Richard Earl of Cornwall with rest being remodelled in the 14th century by the Ufford family. The first recorded priest was an Italian, John de Monte Luelli, in the early 13th century. The church was endowed to Hailes Abbey by Richard, 1st Earl of Cornwall and "King of the Romans" (1257-1272) in thanks to God for his survival at sea. (Note: It has been suggested (wrongly) that Cornwall's son Henry of Almain was born and baptised at Haughley Castle in 1235, but he was not born at Haughley but at Hailes (Haylege) Abbey.) Prior to the reformation the church was on the "Pilgrims Way" to the Shrine of St Edmund at Bury St Edmunds Abbey. Visitors would worship at the Chapel of the Holy Cross in Haughley, which contained a piece of the true cross of Christ, in return for a papal remission of their sins. It remained under the patronage of Hailes Abbey until 1537 and the Dissolution of the Monasteries.

The church contains many memorials and hatchments to the Ray, Crawford, Smythe and Ward families as well as remains of medieval stained glass and a fine carved roof. The south tower (c. 1330) contains five bells dating back to the medieval period. The most recent church clock was erected in 1903, a gift of the Bevan family. Previous clocks had been erected from 1697 onwards replacing a public sundial removed by the Woods family. The flagpole on the church tower was erected and gifted by the Palmer family in 2002 to mark the Queen's Golden Jubilee. The current vicar is Andrew Buttress, appointed in 2025.

A United Reformed Church chapel formerly worshipped regularly in the village and now works closely with the Church of England in Haughley.

=== Other prominent buildings ===
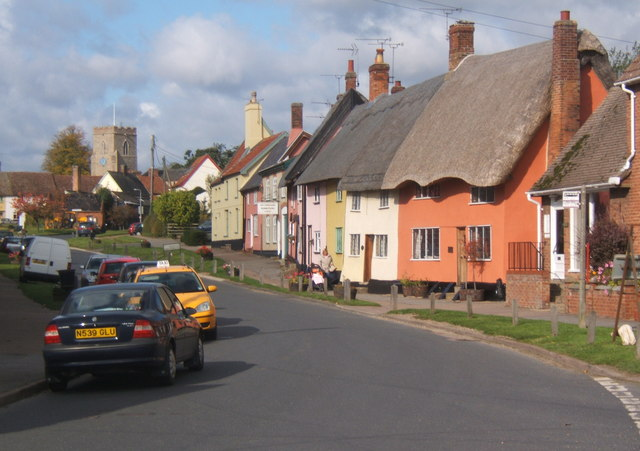
Old Street, Haughley

In and around Haughley are many thatched, painted and listed buildings; these include:

- Haughley Park mansion (a Grade I listed building), built in the 17th century (c. 1620) for the Sulyard family (replacing their house at nearby Wetherden) following service to Queen Mary I. After a devastating fire in 1961 during its restoration, it has been the home of the Williams family since the mid 1960s. The Barn and grounds are used for conferences and weddings.
- Antrim House and the Old Counting House (a Grade II* Listed Building), dating back to the 14th century. It is described as “the stall” within its deeds and contains a rare triple arched medieval shop front. The part of the building containing the restaurant was the general store for 300 years until the early 1980s before conversion to a restaurant.
- Chilton and Mulbra House (a Grade II Listed Building), formerly the Guildhall (though its construction appears to post-date the dissolution of the guilds in 1545) with an impressive queen post roof and a painting of St Blaise
- Dial Farmhouse (c. 1550; a Grade II Listed Building) has a carved porch believed to be from the village of Mendlesham depicting deer and Tudor roses
- New Bells Farmhouse (a Grade II Listed Building), a Tudor moated farm (c. 1530) and possibly once a Dane settlement. The farm was also one of the sites used in the organic farming study, the Haughley Experiment, from 1939. Nearby Walnut Tree Manor was from 1946 to 1985 headquarters of the Soil Association.
- The White House known locally as “The Ark” (a Grade II Listed Building) overlooking the village green, formerly Crown Hall, was built in 1527 by charter of Henry VIII for Roger Bell, (Note: In May 1509, Henry granted to "Roger Bell, yeoman for the King's mouth of the Cellar. To be bailiff of the lordship of Hawleigh, in the county of Suffolk, and keeper of the park there". Bell is said to have who attended the King's coronation) a close friend of the King and "Yeoman of the Keeper of the Kings Cellar". It is reputed that the house was built from smuggled sales of wool out of England and silks into England. The grounds with its orchards and residence are within the site of the outer bailey of Haughley Castle and of the original Iron Age and Prehistoric settlements of the village. The front was remodelled in the Georgian style in the 1850s and it was prior to that it was the home of John Ebden, a surgeon and veteran of the American War of Independence, (Note: A family history names John Ebden (1751-1834) as the surgeon and veteran, adding that he died and was buried at Haughley.) and of the Rev Samuel Christmas Browne, author of Trinity College, Dublin when it was known as the Gipping & Shelland Parsonage whose advowson was in the gift of the Tyrell family until 1892. Prior to this it was known as the Crown Inn when the Hall fell out of favour. The Maltings within the grounds were sold to become a Village Hall in 1907. Since then it has been the residence of the Palmer family for the past seven generations and whom have been resident in Haughley since Tudor times and who are Lords of the Manor of Eye and Constable of Eye Castle. From 1973 to 1990 the property housed a Bakery & Village Museum, one of three in Europe, founded by Roy Palmer. Open for local groups, fetes and charities the museum closed in 1990 and the Palmer Family Trust became the current repository and archive for Haughley village history. The grounds are open from time to time to raise funds for local charities.
- Plashwood House, situated on the old hunting grounds of Haughley Castle, was built in 1901 and has been the residence of the Bevan family since 1907. The previous house - home of the Ray and Tyrrell families - burned down. The garden cottage is a remnant of this original building.

=== Public houses, businesses and other facilities ===
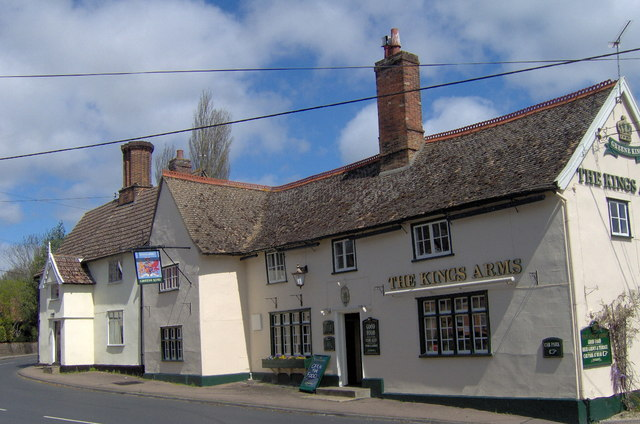
King's Arms Inn, Haughley - geograph.org.uk - 321385

Haughley once possessed many inns and public houses. Now closed pubs include The Fox, The White Horse, The Railway Tavern, The Crown, The Globe, The Angel, The Mulberry Tree, The Hen, and The Cock as well as many other beer houses. The last pub is the Kings Arms which is still currently in operation.

The village post office is one of the oldest in the United Kingdom in continuous use, opening in 1848, with Jasper Pritty its first postmaster. He was succeeded by Alfred Woods (from 1896 to 1936) then the Edwards family. Additionally the village has a veterinary surgeons, a Co-op store, hairdressers, second-hand furniture shop and an Indian restaurant. A butchers, newsagents, electrical store, greengrocers, general store and fish and chip shop closed after many years in the 1990s.

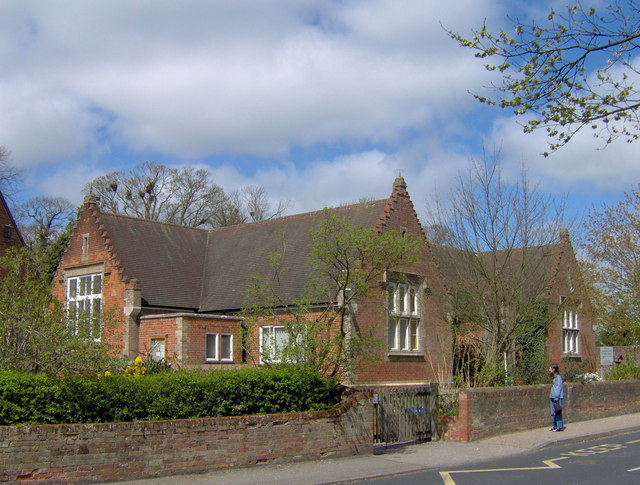
Crawford's School, Haughley - geograph.org.uk - 321973

Haughley Crawford's Primary School is situated adjacent to the church (it takes its name from William Henry Crawford, a rich clergyman and owner of Haughley Park in the mid 19th century who left charitable bequests in his will). In the 1950s a RAF Meteor jet fighter crash landed in the field beyond the school, killing the pilot Peter Phillips - believed to have sacrificed his life to save the children of the school from a direct hit. Hillcroft Preparatory School, an independent school, was located at Walnut Tree Manor in Haughley Green from 1911 until 2007, when it merged with the Finborough School.

==== Palmers Bakery ====
Palmers Bakery is one of the oldest bakeries in the country, first established around 1750 and run by the Palmer family since 1869. The bakery uses 200-year-old brick ovens to bake its bread in the medieval bake house, situated on the site of market place stalls described within its deeds as being "two stalls beneath the market place of Hawley next the house of John Bloom the younger that has long since wasted"; this title predates the Norman conquest and can be traced to the time of the Saxon King Edgar. The House of John Bloom the younger was the pre-Reformation Almshouses. A bakehouse in Haughley market place was owned by Gilbert and Joan Iryng in 1362, in the reign of Edward III. The present building dates from 1650 with additions; it also houses the Cold War era civil defence nuclear air attack siren and power generators.

William James Palmer purchased the business in 1869 (the Palmer family is descended from the family of Roger Palmer, 1st Earl of Castlemaine and husband of Barbara Villiers, mistress of Charles II). The family are direct descendants of Henry II, Sir Clement Higham (Speaker of the House of Commons) and several Archbishops of York. Palmer was a staunch Liberal, trade unionist, pro- abortionist, atheist, republican and follower of Thomas Paine and of the National Secular Society. Working with his father, William Hollingsworth Palmer, he campaigned nationally for the rights of agricultural workers through the foundation of the National Agricultural Labourers Union. He was a friend of Sir Joseph Arch and a close friend and advocate of Charles Bradlaugh. At his death in 1915 he was described by Bradlaugh's daughter and campaigner as "never a truer, loyal friend and advocate of my father and his beliefs through the persecution and personal loss he suffered"; his wife and daughter had died in 1885 of a smallpox virus they contracted on his return from a London campaign. William was present at Bradlaugh's arrest and imprisonment in the House of Commons in 1884 and was at his funeral with Mohandas Gandhi in 1891. Palmer named one of his sons Charles Bradlaugh Palmer after him and several other children after prominent liberals. He was succeeded by his son, William Edwart Gladstone Palmer, who began the milling, pig merchants and farm side of the business as well as the Elmswell bacon factory and E Rand & Son of Wetherden. He married Mable Woods, dying in 1968. William Ewart Gladstone Palmer's son Roy Palmer succeeded and founded the Village & Bakery Museum. He married Margaret Burns from Ulster and died in 1989. The family had milling, arable and pig farming interests in the village and district together with three windmills, but these closed in the 1980s with the family retaining the farm business of just over 1,000 acres (400 ha) of mainly arable farm and the property arm of just over 200 mixed commercial and residential properties in Haughley and in Northern Ireland.

The business is run by fourth-generation descendant Kenneth Palmer, son of Roy, who upon leaving the Ipswich School joined his father in 1965. In 1978 the bakery was the subject of an edition of the BBC children's television series You and Me, and featured Kenneth and his son, former lawyer Kieron Palmer. In 1991, Kieron Palmer joined the company. In 2010, Palmers employed 18 people in the village and over 30 more at shops and the estate and farming business across Suffolk and Northern Ireland, and won a long-lasting dispute with the parish council over rights of access and services to its bakehouse on the village green.

In the summer of 2019 to commemorate its 150th anniversary, a 'funday' and fireworks display was held, attended by 2,500 people, and a village museum based on the Palmer family archive was established. In October 2019, to commemorate the Armistice, Kieron Palmer erected 41 silhouettes of soldiers on the village green, representing the 41 Haughley men who fell in the two World Wars.

=== Transport ===
The village was served by Haughley Road railway station (on the Ipswich and Bury Railway, later part of the Eastern Union Railway) from 1846 to 1849, and then Haughley railway station (built for the Great Eastern Railway) from 1849 to its closure in 1967 as part of the Beeching cuts. The Mid-Suffolk Light Railway branch line ran from Haughley to Laxfield and was initially intended to run further to Southwold. The Haughley junction is a key junction for rail traffic in East Anglia and as such suffered heavy bombing during World War II. The station, its four platforms and turntable were demolished in the 1980s except for one small waiting room which is now the offices of local firm, Manning & Sons.

== Haughley Market ==
Haughley was once the location of a market, predating that of nearby Stowmarket.

Before the Norman conquest in 1066, an "old Saxon market" was situated outside the outer bailey of Haughley Castle, in Duke Street next to the entrance to Castle Farm. After the conquest, the market moved to the current site of the village green. The formal grant of a Saturday market was given on 4 August 1227 by Henry III to Hubert de Burgh, then Lord of the Manor. At that time the outer bailey ditch was being filled in and houses erected upon it (i.e. The Post Office to the White House (Crown Hall) row of properties).

The market was extensive, and carefully regulated; traders — including one "William Hoxon" in 1464 from Stowmarket — were fined as late as the reign of James I for lying in wait to sell meat and eggs outside the bounds of the market. Butchers from Stowmarket were fined in 1540 for selling meat outside the market on market day to the tune of 3s 6d.

By 1500 the market place was surrounded on all sides by buildings backing on to Market Street (today known as Old Street) and Dial Farm. Haughley House, formerly known as the “Tumbledown Poor House”, is a remnant of two houses as an end of terrace and the only remaining row of the south side of the market place. The Angel Inn and the Crown Inn faced directly into the market, which had at least 40 stall placements of around 15 feet (4.6 m) square. Today only one side survives and one building on another side, the Bakehouse - like the Bakehouse, the Counting House and Antrim House deeds similarly described themselves as "stalls". A continuation of properties either side of the Bakehouse to the village pump can be noted today by the different height of the banks of village green along the trackway. The properties on the south side of the market place gradually fell into disrepair and were demolished leaving only an end-of-terrace property known as the 'Tumbledown Poorhouse'; these remnants were remodelled into today's Haughley House, a bed and breakfast business.

Over time, properties and stalls became "wasted" - derelict. From the mid 17th century, the market declined and following a great fire in the village in 1710, "Stowmarket rose from the ashes". In 1855 the market was discontinued, and the space became a village green by grant of enclosure.

== Notable people ==
- Lady Eve Balfour (1898–1989) - a pioneer in the organic farming movement developed her ideas in the Haughley Experiment, conducted at New Bells Farm, Haughley Green, from 1939.
- John Hadfield (1907–1999) - author and publisher, best known for his 1959 comic novel Love on a Branch Line, said to be inspired by the Mid-Suffolk Light Railway branch line from Haughley to Laxfield.
- Diarmaid MacCulloch (born 31 October 1951) - Professor of the history of the church at Oxford University, Knight Bachelor (knighted in the 2012 New Year Honours for services to scholarship), broadcaster, LGBT campaigner and author; son of Rev Nigel MacCulloch, vicar of Haughley and Wetherden, he attended Hillcroft Preparatory School and Stowmarket Grammar School.
- Charles Merton (1821–1885) - New Zealand bootmaker, teacher, musician and farmer was born in Haughley.
- Charles Tyrell (1776–1872) - English Tory politician, MP for Suffolk (1830-1832) and then the Western Division of Suffolk (1832-1835), lived at Plashwood and was buried in the Ray family vault at Haughley.

== Manor of Haughley ==
The Lord of the Manor formerly (c. 1568) had the power of "oyer et terminer" - i.e. the right to hold trials and determine sentence. A gallows was located on Lubberlow field - old English for the hill of spirits where gallows stood - near the site of the current Quarries Cross junction. Prior to the Reformation, the Abbot of Hailes Abbey was required to provide a ladder for the gallows. The Manor relinquished all its rights and holdings in 1878 when John Hayward enfranchised the Copyholders.

The title to the Lord of the Manor of Haughley was held for thirteen years to 1977 by Robin de La Lanne-Mirrlees, said to be an influence on Ian Fleming's fictional character James Bond. The title was purchased for £300 by Geoffery Bowden who in 1977 moved to Haughley from his London birthplace to establish a bed and breakfast business, Haughley House (featured in the third series of Channel 4's Three in a Bed TV series in 2015).
