= Haughley Road railway station =

Former railway station in England

Coordinates: 52.2309°N 0.9698°E

Haughley Road

General information
- Location: Haughley, Mid Suffolk; England

Other information
- Status: Disused

History
- Original company: Eastern Union Railway

Key dates
- 24 Dec 1846: Opened
- 9 Jul 1849: Closed
Location

Haughley Road railway station was the original station serving Haughley, Suffolk. It closed in 1849 and was replaced by Haughley railway station which was positioned to serve both branches to the north of the newly constructed Haughley Junction. As in 2017 some or part of the station buildings still survive adjacent to Bacton Road bridge.

Preceding station	Disused railways	Following station
Elmswell	Eastern Union Railway	Stowmarket
