= Wetheringsett =

Village in Suffolk, England

Coordinates: 52.25768°N 1.11631°E

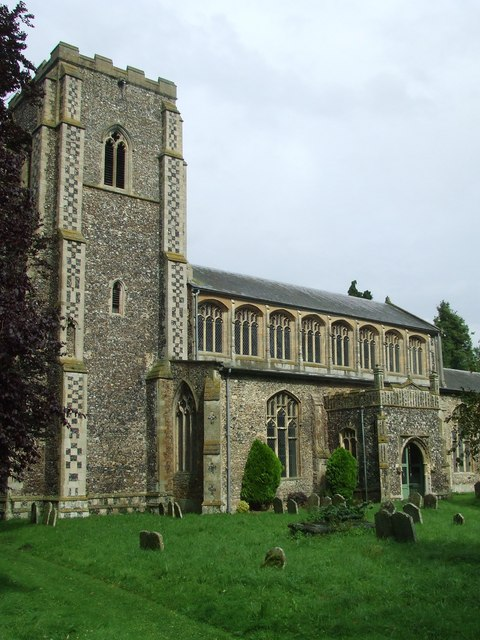
- Church of All Saints

- Location within Suffolk
- Civil parish: Wetheringsett-cum-Brockford
- District: Mid Suffolk
- Shire county: Suffolk
- Region: East
- Country: England
- Sovereign state: United Kingdom
- Post town: Stowmarket
- Postcode district: IP14
- Police: Suffolk
- Fire: Suffolk
- Ambulance: East of England

Wetheringsett is a village in the Mid Suffolk district of Suffolk in eastern England. Located to the east of the A140, it is the largest village in the parish of Wetheringsett-cum-Brockford.

Richard Hakluyt, writer best known for promoting the English colonisation of North America through his works, was rector of All Saints from 1590 to 1616.
