= Love on a Branch Line (TV series) =

1994 British television series

- Genre: Costume drama; Comedy
- Based on: Love on a Branch Line by John Hadfield
- Screenplay by: David Nobbs
- Directed by: Martyn Friend
- Starring: Michael Maloney; Leslie Phillips; Maria Aitken; Abigail Cruttenden; Cathryn Harrison; Amanda Root
- Composer: Ilona Sekacz
- Country of origin: United Kingdom
- Original language: English
- No. of series: 1
- No. of episodes: 4

Production
- Executive producers: John Reynolds; Alan Strachan
- Producer: Jacqueline Davis
- Running time: 50 minutes per episode
- Production companies: Theatre of Comedy Entertainment; DLT Entertainment Ltd. New Penny Productions

Original release
- Network: BBC1
- Release: 12 June – 3 July 1994

Love on a Branch Line is a British television adaptation of the 1959 novel Love on a Branch Line by John Hadfield. It was broadcast from 12 June to 3 July 1994 airing on the BBC in four 50-minute episodes.

== Cast ==
Actor	Role
Michael Maloney	Jasper Pye
Leslie Phillips	Lord Flamborough
Maria Aitken	Lady Flamborough
Abigail Cruttenden	Belinda
Cathryn Harrison	Chloe
Charlotte Williams	Matilda
Amanda Root	Miss Mounsey
Gillian Raine	Miss Tidy
Graham Crowden	Professor Pollux
David Haig	Lionel Virley
Stephen Moore	Quirk
Joe Melia	Mr Jones

== Synopsis ==
Jasper Pye a refined civil servant is sent to the rural Suffolk–Norfolk border to close the Office of Output Statistics which has outlived its usefulness. Instead, he becomes seduced by the small idyllic world he finds there, making his task rather more difficult than he had imagined. He soon finds himself becoming entangled with the local aristocrat's three beautiful daughters.

== Plot ==
Jasper Pye is a civil servant. He hears his girlfriend Deirdre describe him as "a bore" at a party, and decides he needs a radical change in his life. The following morning he is determined to resign his job and move to Paris to become a painter. He is dissuaded by his superior, who instead wants him to go to Arcady Hall in Suffolk where the Office of Output Statistics, a small government department, has been working since 1940 when the Hall was commandeered during the Battle of Britain. The Office has been overlooked for closure for a number of years, despite its apparent lack of usefulness.

Jasper is told that his remit is to close the place down, though he has an entirely "free hand" in the matter. Jasper prepares to leave for the village of Arcady. Symbolically he recovers his umbrella which he had shoved into a flowerbed in St James's Park when planning to abandon the civil service, thinking to himself "Well, it was a rather good umbrella and it might rain".

He catches a train but finds that the branch line to Arcady from the neighbouring town closed four years ago. Instead, he has to walk into the village. He arrives to find Arcady Hall: far too large for the small department of three employees who work there. He quickly finds himself the talk of the town, as the 'man from the ministry' who cuts quite a dash. In particular, he strikes up relationships with each of Lord Flamborough's daughters; Chloe, the eldest (trapped in an unhappy marriage with her drunken, wayward husband Lionel Virley, her first cousin and heir to the estate); Belinda, the flirtatious and uninhibited middle daughter; and the wildly romantic youngest, Matilda.

He meets the eccentric Lord Flamborough who lost both legs in a train accident while working as a driver during the 1926 General Strike and now lives on a steam train on a private railway – the defunct branch line of the title. He has no interest in the Hall, having a passion for Trad Jazz, and seems more interested in the fact that Jasper can allegedly dance the Charleston than remarking on any entanglements Jasper may have with his daughters. He seems to take to Jasper, helping to persuade him to stay for the fete to be held on Bank Holiday Monday in aid of "fallen women", at which Jasper is to judge in a competition of ladies' ankles.

He soon finds that the department's two senior employees spend most of their time running the Hall and researching its history, the village and the local cricket team; anything, in fact, other than the jobs they are supposed to be doing. Jasper finds it very difficult to find out about the work of the department, due to a combination of their evasiveness and his own extracurricular activities, which draw him away from his task.

On one of the rare moments when he actually manages to have a discussion on the department's function, the third employee, Miss Mounsey, tearfully admits to him that she has been making up the statistics for a number of years and is worried this may have affected government policy. Jasper reassures her that "nobody has ever taken the least bit of notice about the work of your department", much to her relief.

Jasper becomes a regular fixture in the life of the village. He has a number of adventures, including painting a portrait of a topless Belinda, finding himself locked in the Hall dungeon/wine cellar with Lionel Virley (where they get completely inebriated) and turning up late to the Arcady versus Flaxfield cricket match, where, although still drunk, he scores the winning runs and rescues the game. He climbs the ivy on the ruined castle wall to join Matilda at the top and finds himself unable to get back down, accidentally persuades Lady Flamborough that he is an expert on gardening, is hailed as a hero in the village (because of the cricket match) and is seen as the village Casanova. Belinda invites him to an assignation and he finds her waiting for him nude on an island in the middle of a lake; they swim together and make love on the grass. Jasper later joins a party on Lord Flamborough's train, but over all these experiences hangs the pall of the difficult decision of whether to close the obviously redundant department despite the rural idyll it supports. Eventually, he announces that the department is to close, a decision which does not go down well with Lord Flamborough or the villagers, although they apparently bear Jasper no ill will, realising he is "just doing his job". The village fete proceeds as planned, including a traction engine rally, the ankle-judging competition (won by Miss Mounsey) and a demonstration of the Charleston by Jasper.

Miss Tidy, a lady who shared the railway carriage with Jasper on his way to Arcady and a former paramour of Lord Flamborough, announces that she has in fact been there acting on behalf of the National Trust who want to preserve the house for the nation, meaning that life can go on as it was before in Arcady. In the original novel, Arcady Hall was destined to become a nuclear research establishment.

Eventually, as Belinda and Matilda, the two unmarried daughters of Lord Flamborough, appear to have become bored with Jasper (just as Deirdre was), he has come to realise that the woman with whom he is most taken is the shy spinster, Miss Mounsey, who very obviously likes him and admits "I don't find you a bore, far from it". When it starts to rain, he embraces his true persona by retrieving the umbrella from the flowerbed. The story ends with Jasper and Miss Mounsey embracing on the platform at Arcady station.

== Production ==
Many of the outdoor scenes were filmed at Oxburgh Hall in Norfolk. Some internal scenes were filmed at Chawton House in Hampshire, while the railway scenes were filmed on the North Norfolk Railway, in particular using Weybourne station as a substitute for the fictional Arcady station. Arcady village and pub were filmed at Heydon, Norfolk. The cricket match was filmed in Hillington, Norfolk.

Each episode is named after a 1920s song, from the Charleston era beloved of Lord Flamborough – "Yes Sir, That's My Baby", "I Wonder Where My Baby Is Tonight", "I Can't Give You Anything But Love, Baby" and "Ain't She Sweet".

== Media releases ==
Love on a Branch Line was released on Region One DVD in 2002 and on Region Two in 2006. These are distributed by Acorn Media UK.
