= John Hadfield (writer) =

British author and publisher (1907–1999)

- Born: 16 June 1907; Birmingham, England
- Died: 10 October 1999 (aged 92)
- Resting place: St Mary and St Peter's Church, Barham, Suffolk
- Education: Bradfield College
- Spouses: Phyllis Anna McMullen (m. 1931; died 1973) Joy Westendarp (m. 1975)

John Charles Heywood Hadfield (16 June 1907 – 10 October 1999) was an English writer and publisher, best known for his 1959 comic novel Love on a Branch Line.

== Biography ==
John Hadfield was born on 16 June 1907 in Birmingham, and was the second son of Heywood George Hadfield (died 1946) and Hilda Bragg (died 1959). He was educated at Bradfield College in Berkshire. Hadfield's career began in 1935 when he joined J. M. Dent & Sons as an editor, a position he held until 1942. That year he became a Book Officer for the British Council and formed a unit translating books into Arabic. In 1944, while travelling to the middle east, his ship was torpedoed and sunk in the mid-Atlantic. In the aftermath he was sent to recover in Norfolk. Between 1944 and 1950, he served as the director of the National Book League.

He moved to Suffolk just before the closure of the Mid-Suffolk Light Railway branch line from Haughley to Laxfield and it was this that is said to have inspired the novel Love on a Branch Line.

After the war he founded the Cupid Press, which specialised in limited-edition anthologies of verse. In 1956, he published A Book of Britain, an anthology of words and pictures covering 500 years of art, articles and poems celebrating the best of British culture.

Following the success of Love on a Branch Line, he and his wife Anna McMullen bought Barham Manor in Suffolk. Hadfield was an avid gardener and was a member of the Savile Club in London.

In 1931, Hadfield married Phyllis Anna McMullen of the McMullen's Brewery family. John and Anna had one son, Jeremy Heywood Hadfield (1932–1988). The Hadfields settled in Hitchin, Hertfordshire before moving in 1952 to Suffolk. In Suffolk, they purchased Barham Manor, a 16th century house north of Ipswich. After Anna's death in 1973, in 1975 he remarried to Joy Westendarp and moved to Woodbridge. Hadfield died on 10 October 1999, aged 92. He was buried in Sussex beside his first wife.
