= LNER Class J64 =

Class of British steam locomotives

MSLR 0-6-0T LNER Class J64
Type and origin
- Power type: Steam
- Designer: Hudswell Clarke
- Builder: Hudswell Clarke
- Serial number: No.1: 711; No.2: 723; No.3: 867
- Build date: No.1: November 1904; No.2: March 1905; No.3: April 1909
- Total produced: 3
Specifications
- Configuration
  - Whyte: 0-6-0T
- Gauge: 4 ft 8 1/2 in (1,435 mm)
- Driver dia.: 3 ft 4 1/2 in (1.029 m)
- Length: No.1: 25 ft 6 in (7.77 m); No.2: 25 ft 0 in (7.62 m)
- Axle load: No.1: 11.1 long tons (11.3 t); No.2: 12.35 long tons (12.55 t)
- Loco weight: No.1: 29.15 long tons (29.62 t); No.2: 28 long tons (28.45 t)
- Fuel type: Coal
- Fuel capacity: No.1: 1.3 long tons (1.3 t); No.2: 1.15 long tons (1.17 t)
- Water cap.: No.1: 570 imp gal (2,600 L; 680 US gal); No.2: 600 imp gal (2,700 L; 720 US gal)
- Firebox
  - Grate area: 8.86 square feet (0.823 m^{2})
- Boiler pressure: 140 psi (0.97 MPa)
- Cylinders: Two, inside
- Cylinder size: No.1: 13 3/4 in × 20 in (350 mm × 510 mm); No.2: 13 in × 20 in (330 mm × 510 mm)
Performance figures
- Tractive effort: No.1: 11,110 lbf (49.4 kN); No.2: 9,931 lbf (44.18 kN)
Career
- Class: LNER: J64
- Retired: 1924–1929
- Disposition: All scrapped

The LNER Class J64 was a class of three 0-6-0T steam locomotives of the London and North Eastern Railway.

They were built by Hudswell Clarke for the Mid-Suffolk Light Railway and were acquired by the LNER when it took over the Mid-Suffolk in 1924. Number 3 was withdrawn immediately and never received an LNER number. Nos. 1 and 2 were renumbered as LNER 8316 and 8317 respectively.

== Dimensions ==
The dimensions for Nos. 1 and 2 are shown in the infobox (right). Dimensions for No. 3 are not known but it is believed to have been similar to No. 1, except that the cylinder bore was 14 inches (356 mm).

== Withdrawal ==
Withdrawal dates were:

- No.1 (LNER 8316) January 1928
- No.2 (LNER 8317) December 1929
- No.3 (no LNER number) August 1924

None of the locomotives are preserved.
