= Mid-Suffolk Light Railway =

Standard gauge railway

Coordinates: 52.2503°N 1.1178°E

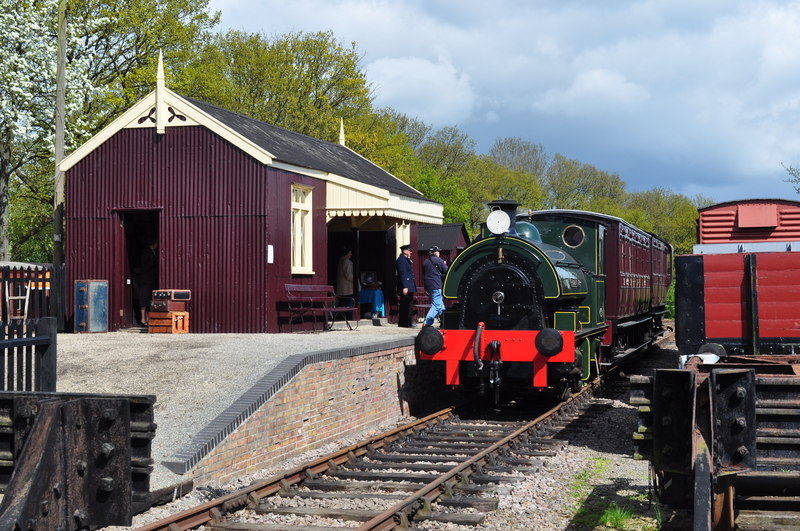
- Falmouth Docks in full steam.
- Locale: England
- Terminus: Brockford

Commercial operations
- Name: Mid-Suffolk Light Railway
- Built by: Mid-Suffolk Light Railway
- Original gauge: 4 ft 8 1/2 in (1,435 mm) standard gauge

Preserved operations
- Operated by: Mid-Suffolk Light Railway
- Stations: 2
- Length: 1/2 mile (0.8 km)
- Preserved gauge: 4 ft 8 1/2 in (1,435 mm) standard gauge

Commercial history
- Opened: 1908
- Closed to passengers: 1952
- Closed: 1952

Preservation history
- 1992: Formation of preservation company

The Mid-Suffolk Light Railway (MSLR) was a standard gauge railway intended to open up an agricultural area of central Suffolk; it took advantage of the reduced construction cost enabled by the Light Railways Act 1896. It was launched with considerable enthusiasm by local interests, and was to build a 50-mile (80 km) network, but actual share subscription was weak, and the company over-reached its available financial resources. It opened 19 miles (31 km) of route from Haughley to Laxfield in 1904 to goods traffic only, and income was poor, further worsening the company's financial situation.

The Board continued to harbour ambitions to complete the planned network, but crippling interest on loans and capital repayments falling due forced the company into receivership in 1906. Passenger operation was started in 1908, but this too was disappointing. At the grouping of the railways in 1923, the MSLR was still in receivership, and there was a protracted dispute over the liquidation of the debt, but in 1924 the Company was absorbed into the London and North Eastern Railway.

The poor usage of the line led to its closure in 1952. A heritage group started a railway museum site at Brockford, and as a charity it trades as the Mid-Suffolk Light Railway. The original line and the heritage line are informally referred to as The Middy.

== First railways ==
The first railway through central Suffolk was the Ipswich and Bury Railway: it opened from Ipswich to Haughley and Bury St Edmunds in 1846. The company was absorbed by the Eastern Union Railway in 1847, and in 1848 and 1849 the line was extended to Norwich from Haughley.

Further east the East Suffolk Railway was opened in 1859, joining Ipswich to Yarmouth and Lowestoft. The lines were absorbed by the dominant Eastern Counties Railway, and in 1862 the ECR and other lines in East Anglia were amalgamated to form the Great Eastern Railway.

The central area between these lines was chiefly agricultural in nature, and industrial development was insignificant.

== Light railway legislation ==
The Light Railways Act 1896 was intended to foster the construction of low-cost railways by permitting streamlined processes for authorisation, and in some cases lower technical standards for safety equipment. In October 1898 H. L. Godden of Jeyes and Godden, civil engineers, wrote to parish councils of several villages in Mid-Suffolk, saying that they had a client (it proved to be B. M. Kilby) who would match local subscriptions towards a light railway to serve the district. Enthusiasm for the scheme gathered pace, and soon 296 persons had contributed nearly £1,000 towards the legal costs, with amounts varying between a shilling and £1.

An application for a light railway order was made in May 1899, and the Light Railway Commissioners held an inquiry in Ipswich, on 6 July 1899. It was an ambitious scheme for 50 miles of railway, described by its supporters as "the most important Light Railway scheme to be brought before the Commissioners since the Light Railway Act of 1896." The network would interconnect the Ipswich to Norwich main line and the East Suffolk line; it was to run from Haughley to Halesworth, 27 1/2 miles, from Bedingfield to Westerfield, 14 miles, and from Debenham to Needham Market, 8 miles. Omnibuses would run in connection with trains from Westerfield to the centre of Ipswich. The railway would be standard gauge.

At the hearing, the GER was cautiously supportive, subject to agreement about junction connections. It was suggested that the very large number of level crossings should all have resident keepers, but it was agreed that that would be unreasonably expensive. There was some objection to both the Haughley and Needham Market connections, and the latter was dropped, reducing the network to 42 miles. Accordingly, the Mid-Suffolk Light Railway Order 1900 was made on 5 April 1900. The share capital was to be £225,000. Public ungated level crossings were to be equipped with cattle guards. There were complex restrictions in the event of the use of electric traction—street running tramways were being installed in Ipswich and elsewhere at the time.

== Construction ==
The directors wasted no time in preparing for construction, and a contract was awarded to S Pearson and Sons on 27 July 1900. However, after a few months Pearson and Sons were complaining that they had not yet had instructions to proceed; this seems to have been due to a delay in securing subscribed capital. At a board meeting on 23 November 1901, the engineers explained that there was difficulty in making the line near the River Blyth at Halesworth, and a deviation was recommended. The company's bankers were asked to give an overdraft of £1,000 to pay for additional surveys, pending the issue of shares. In fact it was not until December 1901 that a prospectus was published for the share issue. The tone of the document made it clear that this was no rural backwater branch, but that the Company saw its line as an integral part of the long-distance network of the country. Half the share capital was being offered now as ordinary shares, with the second half to be issued later as preference shares. S Pearson and Sons resigned from the contract at this stage, evidently frustrated at the lack of action by the Company, and S Jackson of London was appointed instead.

The first sod was cut on 3 May 1902 in a field at Westerfield; "no expense was spared" despite the company's financial problems; 600 guests attended for a sumptuous luncheon, many brought in by special trains; the 83-year-old Duke of Cambridge performed the ceremony. On 22 July 1902, a further overdraft was agreed with the bank: £15,000 this time. Several more were to follow.

On 22 September 1902 Lord Kitchener, the hero of Khartoum, had received the Freedom of Ipswich and the following day he visited Mr Chevallier at Aspall Hall. As the line was substantially complete from Haughley to Mendlesham, Kitchener was conveyed on the line in the contractor's wagon, afterwards continuing by motor car, one of the first in the district, following the planned route.

At an Annual General Meeting in August 1903 it was announced that further overdrafts had been taken due to poor take-up of the preference shares. Westerfield was now favoured as the priority for opening, as it was now hoped that residential traffic could be generated there. Steam railcars had been introduced by the London and South Western Railway and this system appeared to offer a major benefit in technical and business terms. At the end of 1903 the Company's financial position was becoming obviously unsustainable, yet when the bankers stated that no further overdraft facility would be available, the directors were said to be surprised at the news. The Treasury informed the railway company in April 1904 that they would advance £25,000 as a grant, provided East Suffolk County Council advanced a similar sum, but the County Council refused.

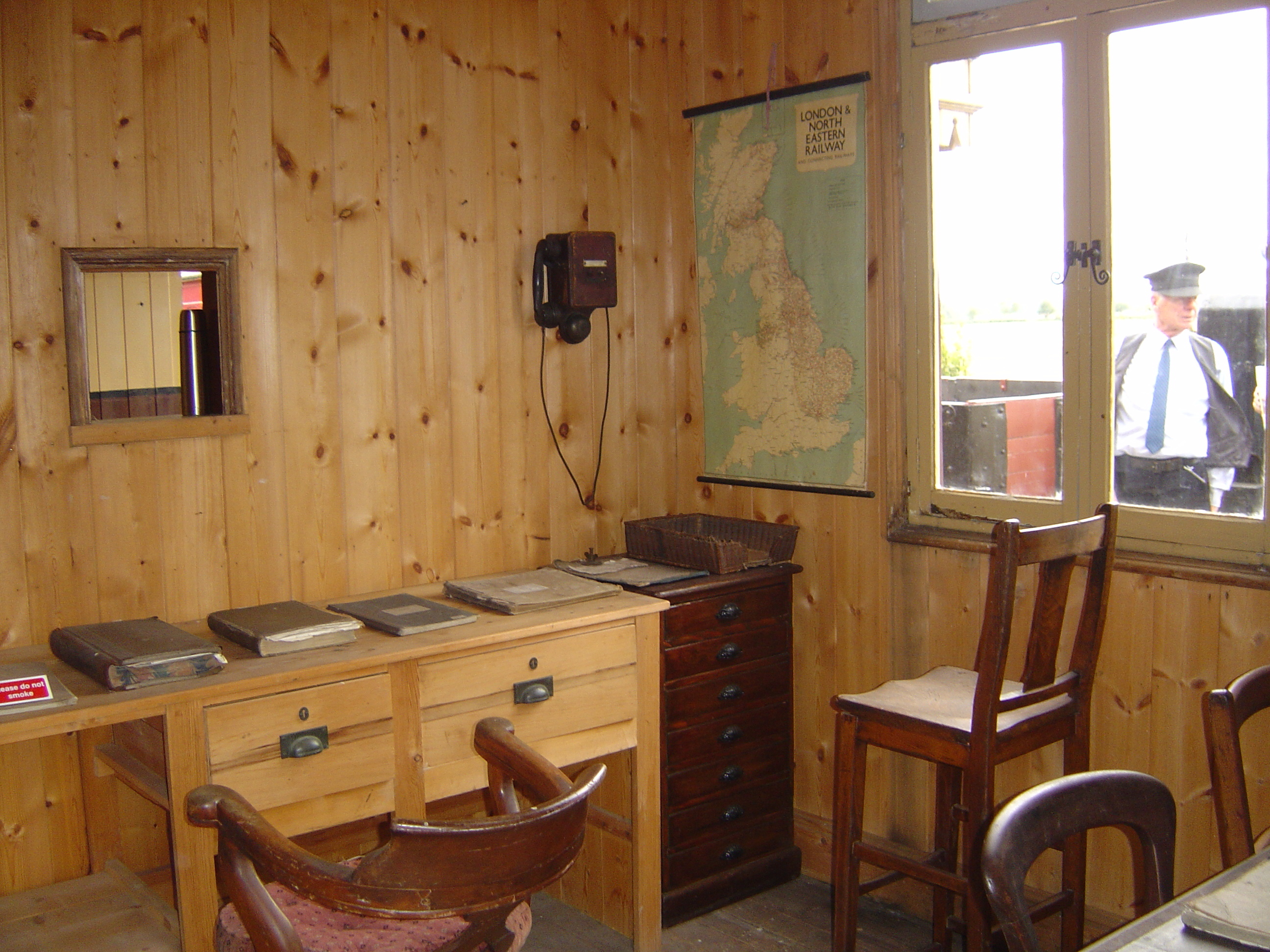
The Booking office of a typical Middy Station

Discussions with the GER over the configuration of the junctions appeared to have been concluded, but an enquiry about the use of Haughley GER station resulted in a demand for a rental which the MSLR considered unaffordable. It took until February 1905 for the proposed deviation at Halesworth to be agreed by the Commissioners, due to delay by the Mid-Suffolk company in submitting definite proposals. Even then there was a dispute over the steep gradient on which train marshalling would have to take place, and interference between the MSLR and GER traffic during the process.

== Opening ==
The line was opened between Haughley and Laxfield to goods traffic on 20 September 1904, although much work remained to be done to complete the line. The first train left Haughley at 8.00 a.m. hauled by Jackson's 0–6–0 tank locomotive Lady Stevenson. There was no ordinary goods traffic to convey, so the load was ballast wagons required by the contractor further down the line, although several packages were picked up at various stations on the return journey.

The first of the company's own locomotives was delivered from Hudswell Clarke at the beginning of November 1904; it was an 0–6–0 tank engine, numbered 1 and named Haughley. It had been available for opening day, but the manufacturers were suspicious of the Company's ability to pay, and they did not release it at first. Some goods wagons arrived later. A second locomotive was delivered in March 1905. Goods stations were located at Mendlesham, Aspall, Kenton, Horham and Stradbroke, and later at Old Newton, Brockford, Worlingworth and Wilby. Use of the line for cattle traffic in the Laxfield area had a noticeable adverse effect on GER traffic at Framlingham, (Note: On a branch of the East Suffolk line.) which had been used as a railhead for cattle traffic previously.

In January 1905 the board planned the start of a passenger service of four passenger trains each way between Haughley and Laxfield, increased to six on Tuesdays (Ipswich market day). In January the railway carried about 1,500 tons of goods, 30 trucks of cattle and 500 parcels, and an early cattle train started running on Ipswich market days. Passenger train operation was not permitted until the line had been inspected by an officer of the Board of Trade, and this had not yet been done. Notwithstanding the prohibition, a private passenger train was run in June 1905, when an Ipswich historical study society visited churches and large houses in the area. More than one hundred members joined a Mid-Suffolk train formed of the company's new coaching stock at Haughley for a run to Kenton, and back after viewing buildings there. At the time the Ipswich to Norwich bridge had not been completed, and the line climbed to a temporary level crossing over the road.

In 1905 it was stated that the company owned two locomotives, seven carriages, two brake vans, 18 goods wagons, two horseboxes and six cattle wagons. All the rolling stock was paid for (Note: By overdraft loans secured on the personal surety of Board members.) except locomotive No. 2. In this period a running battle developed between the contractor and the company, over whether the contractor had completed his obligations; the company's own engineer was compromised and he was replaced.

At the end of March 1905 the company's chairman, Francis Seymour Stevenson, suddenly resigned and it became known that he was personally bankrupt. There was a public bankruptcy hearing. Coupled with the departure of the contractor, this put the company's reputation in the worst possible light, and when debentures became due for repayment and there was no money to discharge the debt, writs were immediately issued against the company. The company sold land at Westerfield, intended for the line there, to the Great Eastern Railway, and used the money to pay some of the debt down.

The Board of Trade inspection necessary for passenger operation took place on 2 July 1905, when Lieutenant Colonel P. G. Von Donop visited. There were a large number of deficiencies and von Donop refused permission.

The company decided during 1906 to extend the line by over a mile and a half to Cratfield (Goram's Mill), and in June 1906 this was opened. Passengers were occasionally permitted to ride on the goods service.

In extending to Cratfield, the company decided to slow down construction to Westerfield and suspended the loading facility at Debenham.

== Administrative problems ==
More debentures were due in October 1906 and Eagle Insurance Company representatives sat in on the Board meeting. There was no means of paying the money, and the Company became bankrupt, a receiver being appointed from 6 October 1906. After a short interregnum, J F R Daniel was brought in to be receiver; he had been successful in keeping the Weston, Clevedon and Portishead Light Railway in operation during its financial crises. Daniel was now 78 years old.

In February 1907 a public hearing into the Halesworth deviation was at last held: the company proposed to cross the GER line and join the narrow-gauge Southwold Railway, and use its Halesworth terminus. The gauge of the Southwold line there would be altered, probably by providing mixed gauge. The GER objected to what they saw as an amalgamation of the MSLR and the Southwold line, on the grounds of unfair competition with their own railway, and the Commissioners found in favour of that objection: the MSLR was unable to proceed.

== Passenger operation ==
The priority of the Receiver was now to start passenger operation, and much work was done to that end. Von Donop visited the line to consider the matter on 25 September 1908. He was not entirely happy with the progress made, but subject to an undertaking to rectify a number of minor matters he approved the opening, and a passenger service started on 29 September 1908.

== From 1909 ==
In February 1912 it was decided to suspend traffic on the section from Laxfield Mill to Cratfield, as income on the section was very poor. Even now the Directors, who of course were not in control of the Company as it was still in receivership, sought advice from the Railway Commissioners about reviving the extension to Halesworth. The reply inevitably reminded them that they would have to purchase their line back from the receiver, and obtain the consent of the debenture and preference share holders; this was obviously an impossible task, and at length the directors accepted the reality that their scheme to cross the Mid-Suffolk area by rail was unachievable. The track that had been laid beyond Laxfield was recovered for war use in 1914. The Cratfield extension from Laxfield had been opened in 1906, and closed in February 1912. The originally proposed 50-mile network was reduced to 19 miles.

In the Summer of 1911 a Sunday service of two trains each way was run, but it was not considered a financial success and was not repeated in later years.

== Grouping of the railways ==
After World War I the huge backlog of maintenance overwhelmed the company's ability to pay for it against falling income. The Railways Act 1921 brought most of the railways of Great Britain into the ownership of one or other of four new large companies, in a process called "the grouping". The MSLR was to be absorbed by the new London and North Eastern Railway (LNER). However the MSLR was in receivership still, and there were large liabilities and uncertainty about how to discharge them. £89,794 was owed, and an appeal was not affordable because of the cost. The LNER negotiated with debenture holders and negotiated a reduction of the debt to £29,960. The dispute took some time, only being resolved on 3 April 1924; the actual transfer was to date from 1 July 1924, with official transfer back-dated to 1 January 1923.

The viability of the passenger operation came under scrutiny, and it was reported that from 1925 to 1928, the number of passenger bookings from the branch stations had reduced from 3,296 to 2,162; (Note: Paye quotes these as sterling (pound) values; that appears to be a mistake because of the £990 gross figure also quoted.) takings on the line in 1930 amounted to £990. At this period there was a serious proposal to convert the line to a road, but it was found to be impractical.

== From 1945, and closure ==
During World War II the passenger train service was reduced to two trains each way daily and remained at that level throughout the remaining lifetime of the line. From November 1939 the branch trains used the LNER platform at Haughley; the MSLR station was used for goods sidings purposes only.

The declining use of the line and the increasing deficit led to a decision to close, and all train services were withdrawn from 28 July 1952. The railway was later taken up by contractors using a Ruston 48DS.

== Topography ==
Passenger stations:

- Haughley; opened 29 September 1908; closed November 1939 trains transferred to main line station;
- Mendlesham; opened 29 September 1908; closed 28 July 1952;
- Brockford and Wetheringsett; opened 29 September 1908; closed 28 July 1952;
- Aspall and Thorndon; opened 29 September 1908; closed 28 July 1952;
- Kenton; opened 29 September 1908; closed 28 July 1952;
- Worlingworth; opened 29 September 1908; closed 28 July 1952;
- Horham; opened 29 September 1908; closed 28 July 1952;
- Stradbroke; opened 29 September 1908; closed 28 July 1952;
- Wilby; opened July 1909; closed 28 July 1952;
- Laxfield; opened 29 September 1908; closed 28 July 1952.

== Heritage railway ==
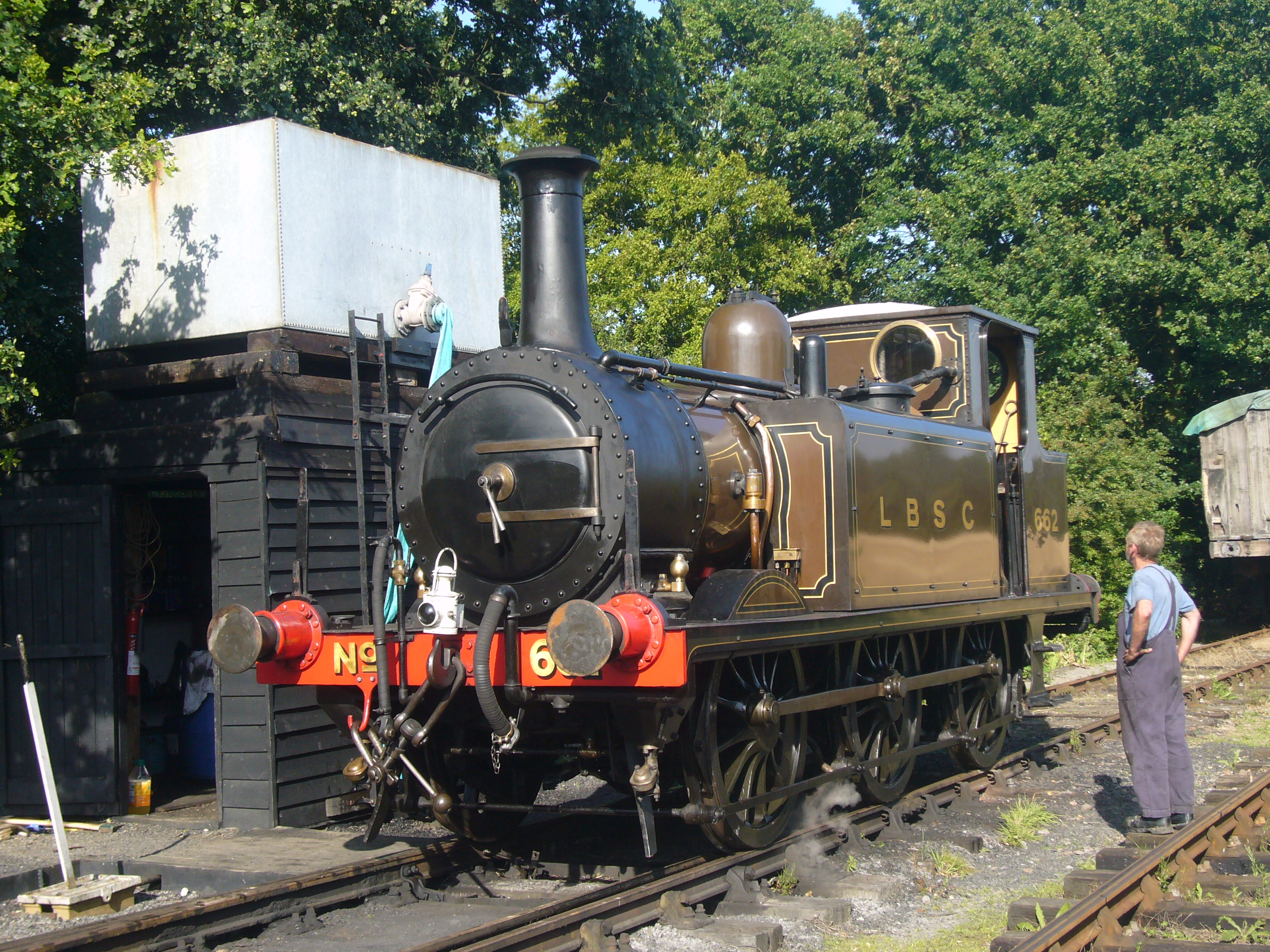
Visiting loco "Martello", a LB&SCR A1 Class "Terrier" at rest.

Nearly 40 years after it closed, a group of enthusiasts formed a Company to recreate the Middy Line at the site of the Brockford and Wetheringsett railway station.

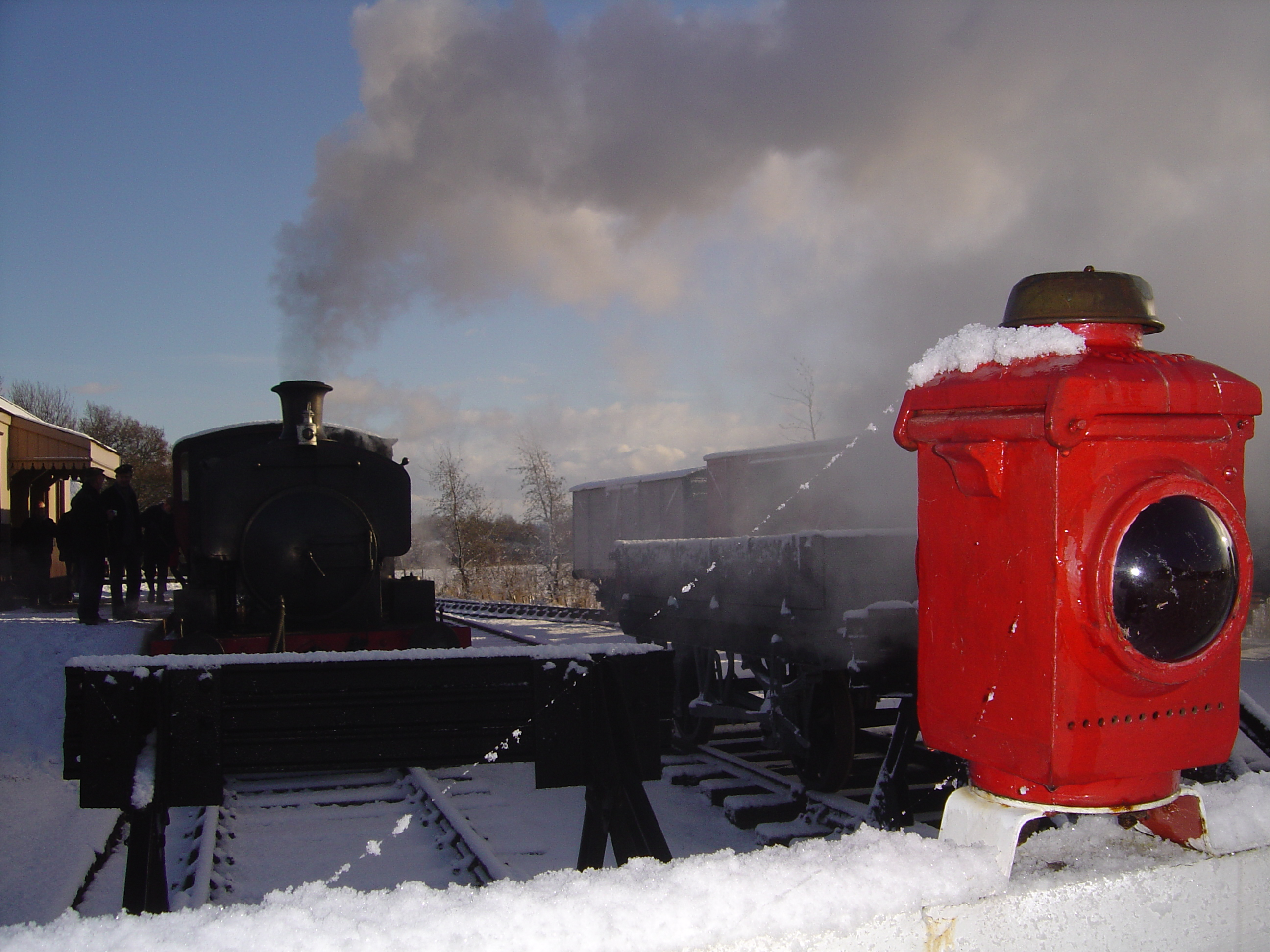
The Middy in winter

The Mid-Suffolk Light Railway Society had a difficult task ahead of them due to the lightly constructed nature of the original line. As far as is known, no coaches or locomotives of the Middy are still in existence, and the corrugated iron buildings were either left to rust or sold to become farm sheds. However, the Company has been recreating typical scenes from the Middy's past by using restored coaches and wagons that would have run on its bigger neighbour, the Great Eastern Railway, and its successor, the London & North Eastern Railway. The Society has been able to collect a number of Great Eastern coaches, three are now in working order, with others under restoration. The museum has also been able to collect some of the remaining station buildings from former Middy railway stations.

In February 2017, permission was obtained to extend the line to a new station, to be named Wilby Halt. The society plans to eventually reopen the line as far as Aspall. The railway made progress on this extension during the COVID-19 pandemic, the work being carried out by Network Rail contractors. On 1st August 2025 an extension to the future site of Aspall Halt was opened.

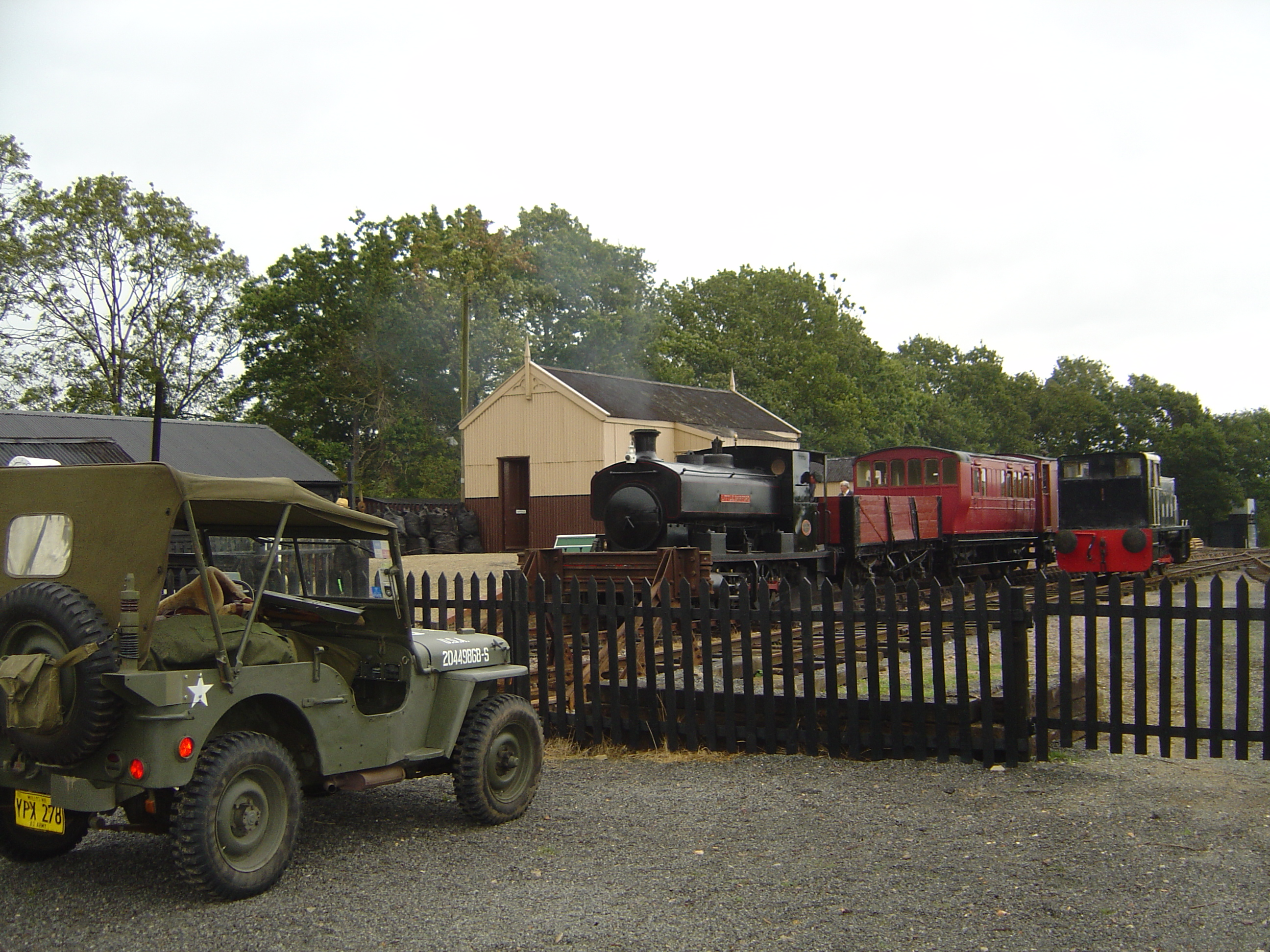
American Jeep parked in Brockford Station yard

The society also has a collection of goods wagons and road delivery vehicles, and line side artefacts. In addition there is an archive of photos and original artefacts from the working life of the Mid-Suffolk Light Railway. The museum operates from April to the end of September on Sundays and Bank Holidays, with Santa specials in December. Many of the Open Days have a Special Event to accompany the running of the steam locomotive.

== Rolling stock of the Mid-Suffolk Light Railway ==
This is for the rolling stock of the Mid Suffolk Light Railway.

Rolling stock of the mid-Suffolk light railway

== Love on a branch line ==
The line was used as inspiration for the John Hadfield novel, Love on a Branch Line. The book was first published in 1959, and was turned into a television series in 1994.
