= Bardolph =

Bardolph or Bardolf is a surname and, in Middle English, a personal name. It originates from the Continental Germanic Bartholf or Bardwulf, from bard meaning "axe" and wulf meaning wolf, via the Old French Bardol(f). It may refer to:

== People ==
- Hugh Bardulf or Bardolf (died c. 1203), English administrator and royal justice
- William Bardolf (leader) (died 1275 or 1276), English baronial leader
- Hugh Bardolf, 1st Baron Bardolf (died 1304), English noble
- John Bardolf, 3rd Baron Bardolf (1314–1363), son of Sir Thomas Bardolf, 2nd Baron Bardolf
- William Bardolf, 4th Baron Bardolf (1349–1386), son of the 3rd baron
- Thomas Bardolf, 5th Baron Bardolf (died 1408), rebel against King Henry IV
- William Phelip, 6th Baron Bardolf (1383–1441), Baron Bardolf in right of his wife Joan, daughter of the 5th baron
- Doug Bardolph (1893–1951), Australian journalist, trade unionist and politician, brother of Ken
- Ken Bardolph (1895–1964), Australian politician, brother of Douglas

== Fictional characters ==
- Bardolph (Shakespeare character), an alcoholic thief in four of Shakespeare's plays
