= William Bardolf =

William Bardolf may refer to:

- William Bardolf (leader) (died c. 1275), English baron
- William Bardolf, 4th Baron Bardolf (1349–1386), English landowner
- William Phelip, 6th Baron Bardolf (died 1441), English member of the Royal Household
