= George Burr (cricketer) =

English cricketer and Anglican priest

George Frederick Burr (5 November 1819 – 5 December 1857) was an English first-class cricketer and Anglican priest.

Burr was born in Marylebone and educated at Maidstone Grammar School and St John's College, Cambridge. He was awarded a cricket blue in 1840, appearing for Cambridge University in three first-class matches in 1840 and 1841. After graduating he was ordained as a Church of England priest and was curate at Frittenden, Kent, 1844–55. He became curate at Worlingworth with Southolt, Suffolk, in 1856 but died at Dennington, also in Suffolk, in 1857.

== Bibliography ==
- Haygarth, Arthur (1996) [1862]. Scores & Biographies, Volume 1 (1744–1826). Kennington: Frederick Lillywhite. ISBN 978-19-00592-23-9.
- Haygarth, Arthur (1997) [1862]. Scores & Biographies, Volume 2 (1827–1840). Kennington: Frederick Lillywhite. ISBN 978-19-00592-23-9.
