= Stradbroke (disambiguation) =

Stradbroke is a village in Suffolk, England.

Stradbroke may also refer to:

- Stradbroke railway station, former station in Suffolk, England
- Stradbroke Island, a former sand island near Brisbane, Queensland, Australia
  - North Stradbroke Island
  - South Stradbroke Island
- Stradbroke Handicap, thoroughbred handicap horse race held at Brisbane
- Earl of Stradbroke in the peerage of the United Kingdom
