= Baron Bardolf =

The Bardolf Arms, blazoned as 'Azure, three cinquefoils Or'

Baron Bardolf or Bardolph was a title in the Peerage of England.

The title was created when Sir Hugh Bardolf of Wormegay in Norfolk received a writ of summons to Parliament on 6 February 1299. After his death, the barony passed from father to son until 4 December 1406, when the fifth Baron was declared by Parliament to be a traitor, and the title was forfeited.

== Honour at Coronation of the Monarch ==
An ancient recipe for Malepigernout or Dillegrout, a spiced chicken porridge, was historically made by the current Lord of the Manor of Addington to be served upon the Coronation of the Monarch of England. The service was inherited through the Bardolf's marriage to the Aguillons. The first documented serving was at the coronation of Richard II in 1377 by the fourth Baron Bardolf; the potage was served at the earlier coronation of Edward II since the duty was referenced at the inquest following the death of the first Baron Bardolf, and at least as early as the coronation of Edward I in 1272. This ancient recipe is listed as "Bardolf" in an Arundel manuscript of early 15th-century date. Brought as an honour by the Lord of the Manor of Addington to the Coronation of the King of England. Three dishes of this gruel are served, the first to the new king, the second to the Archbishop of Canterbury, and the third to whom the king assigns it.

Etymology: "Mess de Gyron" (c. 1254), Maupygernoun Serjeanty; malpigeryan; malepigernout. Gruel, dilgirunt, dillegrout (1377) (dillegrout is a hapax legomenon—a word written in a dictionary or authoritative document that has no prior appearance in language).

"Take almonde mylk, and draw hit up thik with vernage, and let hit boyle, and braune of capons braied and put therto; and cast therto sugre, claves (cloves), maces, pynes, and ginger mynced; and take chekyns parboyled and chopped, and pul of the skin, and boyle al ensemble, and, in the settynge doune of the fire, put therto a lytel vynegur alaied with pouder of ginger, and a lytel water of everose, and make the potage hanginge, and serve hit forth."—Household Ordinances (Society of Antiquaries), page 466.

The common earthenware pot in which it was made is mentioned in 1304 at the Inquest at Addington on October 14 following the death of Hugh Bardolf, first Baron Bardolf (c. 29 September 1259 – September 1304), where his widow Isabel succeeded him to the two serjeanties (one serjeanty had the duty to make spits in the King's kitchen, the other serjeanty had the duty to make maupygernoun. Upon her death in 1323, the serjeanty of Addington (which required the service of maupigernoun at the Coronation of the King) was succeeded by Thomas Bardolf, second Baron Bardolf (4 October 1282 – 11 December 1357).

From the reign of Charles II onward the dish was presented by the Leigh family. It was still presented by the Lord of the Manor at the coronation of George III in 1760, supposedly by a distant relative who inherited the estates of Sir John Leigh when he died without heirs in 1737. At the banquet of George IV, the right was claimed and obtained by the Archbishop of Canterbury. (The archbishops held Addington from 1807 to 1897).

== Barons Bardolf (1299) ==
- Hugh Bardolf, 1st Baron Bardolf (c. 29 September 1259 – September 1304). Married Isabel Aguillon through which the "Mess of Gyron" sergeantry was inherited.
- Thomas Bardolf, 2nd Baron Bardolf (4 October 1282 – 11 December 1357)
- John Bardolf, 3rd Baron Bardolf (13 January 1312 – July/August 1363)
- William Bardolf, 4th Baron Bardolf and 3rd Baron Damory (21 October 1349 – 29 January 1386)
- Thomas Bardolf, 5th Baron Bardolf (22 December 1369 – 19 February 1408, of wounds received at the Battle of Bramham Moor)
- William Phelip, 6th Baron Bardolf (died 6 June 1441), acquisition and reversion of the barony

== Heirs ==
On 19 July 1408, the reversion of the manor of Wormegay and others was granted to the fifth baron's two daughters and co-heiresses, Anne and Joan, and their husbands. The elder sister Anne was married to Sir William Clifford, and later to Reynold Lord Cobham, and died childless on 6 November 1453. The younger sister Joan was married to Sir William Phelip, who after 1437 was sometimes styled Lord Bardolf and by whom she had an only daughter Elizabeth, and died 12 March 1447. Elizabeth had married John Beaumont, 1st Viscount Beaumont and died before 30 October 1441. Their son William Beaumont was styled Lord Bardolf as early as 1448, though he did not become the sole representative of the fifth baron until the death of his great-aunt Anne Lady Cobham in 1453. He succeeded as 2nd Viscount Beaumont in 1460.

William Beaumont, Viscount Beaumont and (but for the forfeiture) Baron Bardolf died childless on 19 December 1507. His co-heirs were his two great-nephews, descended from his only sister Joan (died 5 August 1466) by her first husband John Lovel, 8th Baron Lovel: Sir Brian Stapleton (died 2 April 1550), son of Sir Brian Stapleton by his wife Joan, elder daughter of Joan Lady Lovel; and Sir John Norreys (died 1564), son of Sir Edward Norreys by his wife Frideswide, younger daughter of Joan Lady Lovel. The abeyance of the barony of Beaumont was terminated in favour of the senior co-heir in 1840, and the junior co-heir has since 1572 been Baron Norreys of Rycote. In 1910 the co-heirs of the forfeited barony of Bardolf were the two daughters of Miles Stapleton, 10th Baron Beaumont (Mona Josephine Tempest Stapleton, 11th Baroness Beaumont and Ivy Mary Stapleton, both of whom left children) and Montagu Bertie, 7th Earl of Abingdon.

== In literature ==
The fifth Lord Bardolf appears in William Shakespeare's history play Henry IV, Part 2. Confusingly, the name Bardolph is shared by a "low" character in the same play, who also appears in related plays.

A fictional Lord Bardolf appears in Benjamin Disraeli's 1845 novel Sybil. In Book 4, Chapter 7, the comical baronet Sir Vavasour Firebrace has an appointment with peerage lawyer Baptist Hatton, who tells him that

Your claim on the barony of Lovel is very good: I could recommend your pursuing it, did not another more inviting still present itself. In a word, if you wish to be Lord Bardolf, I will undertake to make you so, before, in all probability, Sir Robert Peel obtains office; and that I should think would gratify Lady Firebrace.

The historical barony of Lovel (like that of Bardolf dating from 6 February 1299) had been forfeit since the attainder of Francis Lovel, 1st Viscount Lovel, son of Joan Lady Lovel, mentioned above, in 1485, and any right to it was vested in the same co-heirs as the baronies of Beaumont and Bardolf, descendants of Lovel's sisters. By Book 6, Chapter 4 of Sybil the Firebraces have become the Bardolfs and Hatton is attempting to make out his client's claim to the (fictional) earldom of Lovel. Lady Bardolf appears again in Disraeli's 1847 novel Tancred.
