= Edward Lee French =

Indian police officer

Sir Edward Lee French, KCVO (22 July 1857 – 17 May 1916) was an English-born senior officer in the Indian Police Force and a first-class cricketer.

== Life ==
Edward Lee French was born on 22 July 1857, the son of Rev. Frederic French (1823–1907), JP, rector of Worlingworth with Southolt, in Suffolk, and his wife, Anna Maria (d. 1901), eldest daughter of John Davis, JP, DL (d. 1864), of Cranbrooke Park, Essex. He was baptised at Worlingworth. The Rev. French's family came from Eye, Suffolk; his father Thomas was banker to the Henniker family, patrons of Worlingworth's rectory. This connection helped secure Frederic French, newly graduated from the University of Cambridge (BA 1847, MA 1850), the living at Worlingworth, which he held from 1853 to his death in 1907.

Following schooling at Marlborough, Edward French entered the Indian Police in 1879. He was appointed Deputy Inspector-General in the Criminal Investigation Department for the Punjab in 1905. Three years later, he was made Inspector-General of the North-West Frontier Police and then, in 1909, of the Punjab Police. In this capacity, he placed in charge of the police during the Coronation Durbar of 1911, when King-Emperor George V appointed him a Knight Commander of the Royal Victorian Order.

French was also a first-class cricketer, playing cricket in both England and India. In England he played two matches for W. G. Grace's London County in 1902, having previously played for India against Lord Hawke's touring team in 1893. He played one further match in India in 1903, for the Gentlemen of India against the touring Oxford University Authentics team.

In 1886, he married Wilna, daughter of David Ross, CIE at Hoxne. He died on 17 May 1916.
