= Michael Poynings, 1st Baron Poynings =

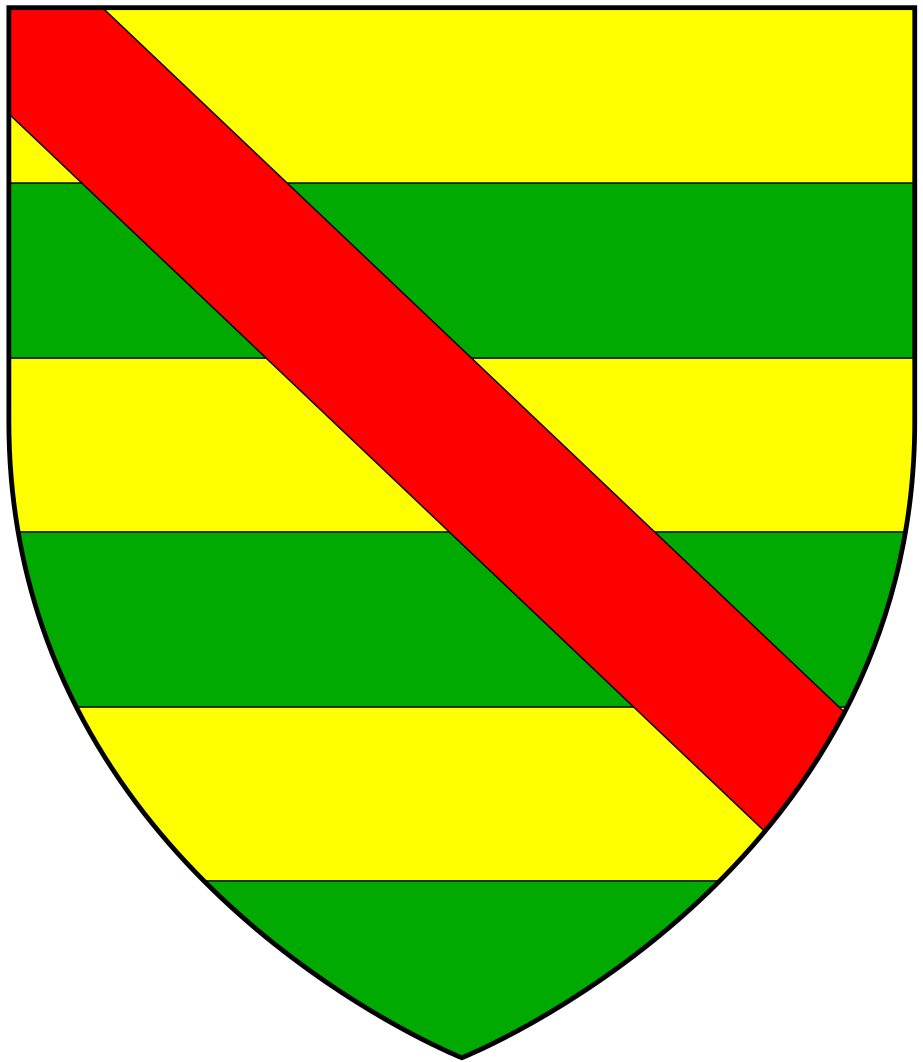
Arms of Poynings: Barry of six or and vert a bend gules. Subsequently quartered by Percy

Michael de Poynings, 1st Baron Poynings, Knt. (c.1318 – 7 March 1369), of Bures St. Mary, Suffolk, was an English nobleman and soldier. He was present at the Battle of Crécy.

Michael de Poynings was summoned to Parliament by writs direct to Michaeli de Ponynges from 20 November 1348 to 24 February 1368. On account of the valiant conduct of his father, Thomas, who died in 1339 in battle at the storming of Hunycourt in Vermandois, France, the King received Michael's homage, though the latter was under age, and granted him livery of his lands and the full benefit of his marriage, taking security for the payment of the relief.

Rayment stated that Thomas de Poynings was summoned to Parliament on 23 April 1337, which would indicate that he was the first baron, but Cokayne held a contrary position, which is that Thomas was summoned to 'a council of prelates and magnates'. The leadership of Thomas at the storming of Hunycourt and Michael's direct feudal obligations to the king are evidence of a prior feudal barony. So some historians number the first barony from Thomas, while most consider Michael to be the first baron.

Michael de Poynings gave a thousand marks to Queen Philippa of Hainault in 1366 for the wardship and marriage of William Bardolf, 4th Baron Bardolf, son and heir of John Bardolf, 3rd Baron Bardolf and his wife Elizabeth Damory. William married Michael's daughter Agnes, who by the name of "Agnes Bardolf" is mentioned as a legatee in the will of her mother, Joane Lady Poynings, dated 12 May 1369, and by that of "Lady Bardolf my sister" in the will of Thomas Lord Poynings, dated 28 October 1374.

== Marriage and issue ==
Poynings married, before 1348, Joan Ruxley (d. 11 May 1369), widow of John de Moleyns, son and heir apparent of John, Baron Moleyns, and daughter of Sir Richard Rokesley. They were buried together in the parish church at Poynings, Sussex. He was succeeded by his son Thomas de Poynings, 2nd Baron Poynings (d. before 25 June 1375), who married before 5 June 1372 as her third husband, Blanche Mowbray (d. 21 July 1409) daughter of John de Mowbray, 3rd Baron Mowbray and his second wife Joan of Lancaster. He also had at least one daughter, Agnes, who married firstly William Bardolf, 4th Baron Bardolf, by whom she had several children, and secondly Sir Thomas Mortimer. She died in 1403.

== Notes ==
Peerage of England
New creation	Baron Poynings; 1337–1369	Succeeded by Thomas Poynings
