= Kenton railway station (Suffolk) =

Disused railway station in England

Coordinates: 52.2571°N 1.2055°E

Kenton

General information
- Location: Kenton, Mid Suffolk; England
- Platforms: 2

Other information
- Status: Disused

History
- Original company: Mid-Suffolk Light Railway
- Pre-grouping: Mid-Suffolk Light Railway
- Post-grouping: London and North Eastern Railway; British Railways

Key dates
- 29 September 1908: Station opens
- 28 July 1952: Station closes
Location

Kenton was a railway station on the Mid-Suffolk Light Railway. The station was located a mile north of the hamlet of Kenton.

== History ==
Opened by the Mid-Suffolk Light Railway, Kenton station was located 10 miles (16 km) from Haughley and is sometimes referred to as Kenton Junction. This station had been intended to be the junction for the proposed branch to Westerfield, but this line was only 2 miles (3.2 km) in length before construction ceased on the outskirts of Debenham.

As well as having the double-ended corrugated station building with open fronted waiting room that were standard on the Mid-Suffolk, Kenton acted as a half-way point on the railway and had a second platform and engine shed.

After the line closed, the station site became an industrial estate.

The station's running-in board and a "Kenton" station sign are preserved in the National Railway Museum, York, as is the Kenton - Laxfield train staff.

Preceding station	Disused railways	Following station
Aspall and Thorndon	Mid-Suffolk Light Railway	Worlingworth
