= Thomas Bardolf, 5th Baron Bardolf =

15th-century English nobleman

Thomas Bardolf, 5th Baron Bardolf (22 December 1369 – 19 February 1408) was an English baron who was the Lord of Wormegay in Norfolk, of Shelford and Stoke Bardolph in Nottinghamshire, and of Hallaton (Hallughton) in Leicestershire, among others, and was "a person of especial eminence in his time".

A supporter of the rebellion of Henry Percy, 1st Earl of Northumberland, against King Henry IV of England after the death of Percy's son Harry Hotspur, he died from wounds received at the Battle of Bramham Moor.

== Life ==
The eldest son of William Bardolf, 4th Baron Bardolf of Wormegay and his wife Agnes de Poynings, Thomas inherited his father's titles as the 5th Baron Bardolf. He was summoned to the Parliament of England from 12 September 1390 to 25 August 1404.

In 1405 he joined Henry Percy, 1st Earl of Northumberland in insurrection against King Henry IV. But their allies Thomas Mowbray (Earl Marshall), and Richard le Scrope, Archbishop of York, were defeated in Yorkshire by John of Lancaster and the Earl of Westmorland, and Bardolf and Northumberland fled to Scotland.

In 1408, Bardolf followed Northumberland in a new invasion of England from Scotland. But at the Battle of Bramham Moor, the rebels suffered a total defeat. Northumberland was slain, and Lord Bardolf was "so much hurt" that he died of his wounds soon after.

Bardolf had married Avicia (or Amice), daughter of Ralph de Cromwell, 2nd Baron Cromwell. He left two daughters, Anne and Joan, his co-heirs. However, his honours and lands had already been forfeited to the Crown by attainder.

== Aftermath ==
William Dugdale states that "Lord Bardolf's remains were quartered, and the quarters disposed of by being placed above the gates of London, York, Lenne (possibly King's Lynn), and Shrewsbury, while the head was placed upon one of the gates of Lincoln; his widow obtained permission, however, in a short time, to remove and bury them".

The estates were divided between Thomas Beaufort, 1st Duke of Exeter (the king's half-brother), Sir George de Dunbar, Knight, and Joan of Navarre, Queen of England; but the latter's portion, upon the petition of his daughters Anne (with her husband Sir William Clifford, knt.) and Joan (with her husband Sir William Phelip), to the king, was granted in reversion, after the Queen's decease, to those sons-in-law of the attainted nobleman.

Also, on "27 April 1407. The King to the sheriff of Lincoln. Referring to the late plea in Chancery between Amicia (sic) wife of Thomas, late lord of Bardolf, and George de Dunbarre regarding certain lands in Ruskynton forfeited by Thomas, which had been granted by the King to George, with the manor of Calthorpe, the half of Ancastre (and many others), wherein it was adjudged that Rusynton should be excepted from the grant and restored to her with the rents, etc., from 27 November 1405, drawn by George, - the King orders him to restore the same to Amicia. Westminster. [Close, 9 Henry IV. m.17.]".

== Arms ==
Bardolf’s coat of arms was blazoned Azure, three cinquefoils, or, meaning three gold cinquefoil flowers on a blue shield.

== Notes ==
Peerage of England
Preceded by William Bardolf	Baron Bardolf; 1386–1408	Forfeit
