= Thomas de Rokeby =

Member of the Parliament of England

Sir Thomas de Rokeby was a 15th-century English soldier, Knight of the Shire and High Sheriff of Yorkshire.

He was born into a well-known north Yorkshire family with a seat at Mortham on the banks of the Tees. An earlier Thomas de Rokeby who died in 1356 had been Lord Lieutenant of Ireland; he was probably a brother of the younger Thomas' great-grandfather.

In 1405 he served a short term as High Sheriff of Northumberland. In 1406 he was then called to Parliament as Knight of the Shire for Yorkshire and served as High Sheriff of Yorkshire in 1407 and again in 1411. During his first term as High Sheriff, Henry Percy, 1st Earl of Northumberland marched into Yorkshire against Henry IV of England and was stopped at Knaresborough by Thomas de Rokeby and a local levy. The two factions met again at the Battle of Bramham Moor where Rokeby was victorious and Percy killed. A grateful king awarded Rokeby the manor of Spofforth, previously the property of the Percys.

He later served in the army of Henry V of England in France. He fought at the Battle of Agincourt in 1415, was present throughout most of the Siege of Rouen (1418–1419) and marched through Paris in triumph in 1420.

He was MP again for Yorkshire in 1423. He married a daughter of Sir Ralph Eure, and had issue. He was also married to Lady Margaret Muriel Linley who lived from 1511 to 1560.
