= Wilby railway station =

Former railway station in England

Wilby

General information
- Location: Wilby, Mid Suffolk; England
- Coordinates: 52.3104°N 1.3010°E
- Grid reference: TM251731
- Platforms: 1

Other information
- Status: Disused

History
- Original company: Mid-Suffolk Light Railway
- Pre-grouping: Mid-Suffolk Light Railway
- Post-grouping: London and North Eastern Railway; Eastern Region of British Railways

Key dates
- July 1909: Station opened
- 28 July 1952: Station closed
Location

Wilby railway station was located approximately two-thirds of a mile (1.1 km) north-east of Wilby, Suffolk. It was on the Mid-Suffolk Light Railway between Stradbroke and the terminus at Laxfield. It opened in July 1909, and closed on 28 July 1952, 44 years after it had opened for passenger traffic.

Preceding station	Disused railways	Following station
Stradbroke; Line and station closed	Mid-Suffolk Light Railway	Laxfield; Line and station closed
