= Dillegrout =

Medieval capon potage

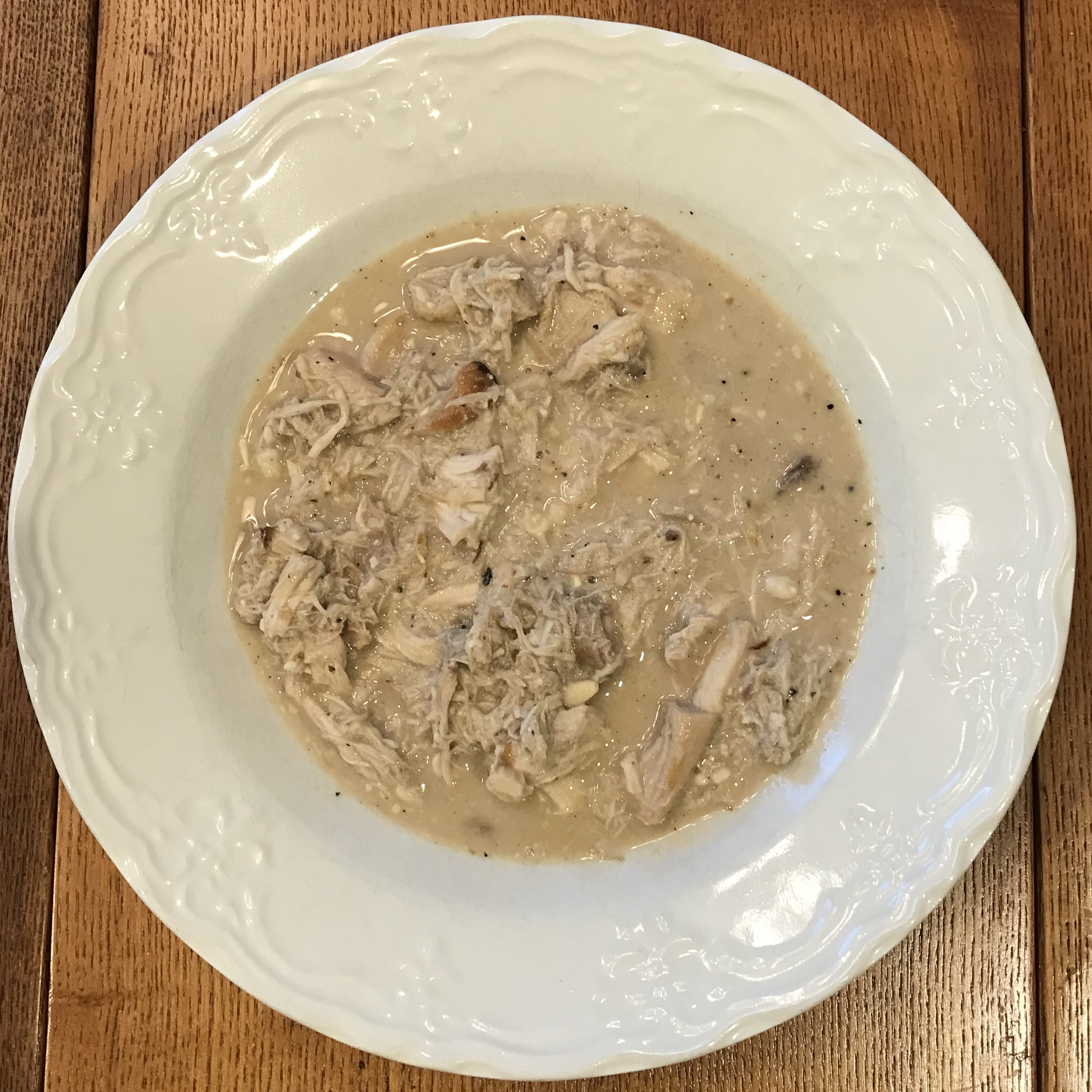
Bardolf, a dish considered to be similar to dillegrout

Dillegrout or dilligrout is a dish traditionally presented at the coronations of kings and queens of England by the holders of the manor of Addington in a kitchen serjeanty. It is generally thought to be a soup or stew made from almond milk, capon, sugar, and spices, but a porridge-like dish of other ingredients has been described. Dillegrout was first presented in 1068 at the coronation of Matilda of Flanders, wife of William the Conqueror, and its final presentation was at the coronation of George IV in 1821.

== History ==
The soup was first presented in 1068 at the coronation of Matilda of Flanders, the wife of William the Conqueror, by Tezelin, the royal cook. The couple liked the soup so much they presented Tezelin with the manor of Addington; to hold the manor he and his descendants would be required to present the dish at all coronations in perpetuity. This requirement, a type of kitchen or culinary serjeanty, was referred to by J. Horace Round as the "Maupygernon serjeanty" or the Addington serjeanty.

The manor was held by "Tezelin, the King's cook", in Domesday. By the early 13th century, the making of "malpigernoun or girunt" was required. At the coronation of Richard II in 1377, the holder was no longer required to cook the dish himself, and William Bardolph made the presentation and the dish was called dilgerunt. Nicholas Leigh of Addington claimed the right to make a mess of pottage at the coronations of Edward VI in 1547 and Mary I of England in 1553, and Oliver or Oliph Leigh claimed the right to make "pigernout or herout" or "degeront" for the coronation of James I and Anne in 1603.

In 1662 Thomas Leigh Esquire "was brought up to the Table with a Mess of Pottage called Dilegrout, by reason of his Tenure of the Manor of Addington." According to Thomas Blount, writing in his 1679 Fragmenta antiquitatis. Antient tenures of land, and jocular customs of some mannors, Charles II "accepted his service, but did not eat the pottage." After the 1685 coronation of Mary of Modena, wife of James II, when the then-lord of the manor of Addington made his presentation, he received a knighthood afterward. Stephen Whatley in his 1751 England's Gazetteer, or, an accurate description of all the cities, towns, and villages of the kingdom noted of the manor of Addington that "The Ld. of this manor, in the R. of Hen. III. held it by this service, viz. to make his Majesty a mess of pottage in an earthen pot in the K's. kitchen at his coronation, called Dilligrout." The soup was last presented in 1821 at the coronation of George IV when a deputy appointed by the Archbishop of Canterbury, then the owner of the manor, presented dillegrout that had been prepared by the king's cook.

According to coronation records, the procession by which the dillegrout is presented starts after the king enters the hall:

The first dish of hot meat is now brought into the hall preceded by two clerks controllers, two clerks of the green cloth, the Master of the Household, the Cofferer, six sergeants-at-arms, the Lord High Steward, with the Earl Marshal on his left, and the High Constable on his right hand. These three dignitaries are on horseback. They are followed by six sergeants-at-arms, then by the Comptroller of the Household, and the Treasurer of the Household, the Assistant to the Queen's Sewer and the Queen's Sewer, the Assistant to the King's Sewer and the King's Sewer. The course of meat is carried either by Gentlemen Pensioners two and two, or, as is more proper, by the new made Knights of the Bath. After them comes the Lord of the manor of Addington carrying the "mess called dillegrout," and the procession is ended by two clerks of the kitchen.

— English Coronation Records

The holder of the serjeanty was referred to as the "Master of the King's Dillegrout".

== Ingredients ==
The soup is generally described as a pottage of almond milk, capon, sugar, and spices. It may be similar to a 15th-century dish named Bardolf, as the Bardolf family held Addington Place for a period:

Take almonde mylk, and draw hit up thik with vernage, and let hit boyle, and braune [dark meat] of capons braied and put therto; and cast therto sugre, claves, maces, pynes, and ginger, mynced; and take chekyns parboyled and chopped, and pul of the skyn, and boyle al ensemble, and, in the settynge doune from the fire, put thereto a lytel vynegar alaied with pouder of ginger, and a lytel water of everose, and make the potage hanginge [clinging, i.e., thick], and serve hit forth.

— Arundel Manuscripts

When fat is added as an ingredient, the dish is called maupygernon.

A notation in an 1821 biography of George III describes the dish as believed to have been served at his coronation in 1761 differently: "The word 'grout' signifies a sort of coarse meal, and the following is the method of preparing the dish mentioned above: The grouts are to be boiled in water, according to the intended thickness; when they become soft, mace, wine, sugar, and currants are to be added. It is then usually served up in a bowl, with a toast laid round it, cut in narrow pieces.

== Similar serjeanties ==
Domesday describes another kitchen serjeanty held by Walter in Essex. By the early 13th century this serjeanty's duties were described as being the "King's Turnspit." Later his duties only required his participation during the feasts of Christmas, Easter, and Whitsun. By the middle of the 13th century, the duty had been replaced by military service, and by the end of the century by paying an annual rent.

== Etymology ==
It was also known as le mess de gyron, girunt, and dilgirunt. Alternate spellings of dillegrout include dilegrout, dillygrout, and dilligrout. According to the Oxford English Dictionary, the derivation is unknown. Alternate spellings of maupygernon include maupigyrnun and malepigernout and malpigernoun.

== See also ==
- Blancmange
