= Worlingworth railway station =

Former railway station in England

Worlingworth

General information
- Location: Worlingworth, Mid Suffolk; England
- Coordinates: 52.2759°N 1.2432°E
- Grid reference: TM213691
- Platforms: 1

Other information
- Status: Disused

History
- Original company: Mid-Suffolk Light Railway
- Pre-grouping: Mid-Suffolk Light Railway
- Post-grouping: London and North Eastern Railway; Eastern Region of British Railways

Key dates
- 29 September 1908: Station opens
- 28 July 1952: Station closes
Location

Worlingworth railway station was a station located in Worlingworth, Suffolk. It was on the Mid-Suffolk Light Railway between Kenton and Horham. It opened on 29 September 1908, and closed on 28 July 1952, 44 years after it had opened for passenger traffic.

Preceding station	Disused railways	Following station
Kenton; Line and station closed	Mid-Suffolk Light Railway	Horham; Line and station closed
