= Horham railway station =

Former railway station in England

Horham
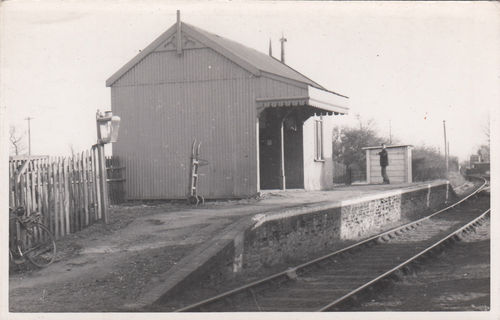

General information
- Location: Horham, Mid Suffolk; England
- Coordinates: 52.3010°N 1.2480°E
- Grid reference: TM215719
- Platforms: 1

Other information
- Status: Disused

History
- Original company: Mid-Suffolk Light Railway
- Pre-grouping: Mid-Suffolk Light Railway
- Post-grouping: London and North Eastern Railway; Eastern Region of British Railways

Key dates
- 29 September 1908: Station opens
- 28 July 1952: Station closes
Location

Horham railway station was located in Horham, Suffolk. It was on the Mid-Suffolk Light Railway between Worlingworth and Stradbroke. It opened on 29 September 1908, and closed on 28 July 1952, 44 years after it had opened for passenger traffic.

Preceding station	Disused railways	Following station
Worlingworth; Line and station closed	Mid-Suffolk Light Railway	Stradbroke; Line and station closed
