= Laxfield railway station =

Former railway station in England

Laxfield
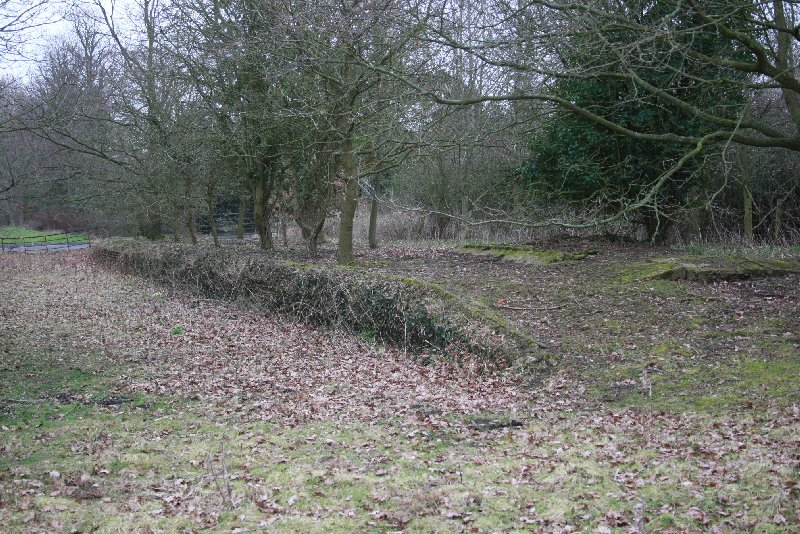

General information
- Location: Laxfield, Mid Suffolk; England
- Coordinates: 52.3024°N 1.3566°E
- Grid reference: TM289724
- Platforms: 1

Other information
- Status: Disused

History
- Original company: Mid-Suffolk Light Railway
- Pre-grouping: Mid-Suffolk Light Railway
- Post-grouping: London and North Eastern Railway; Eastern Region of British Railways

Key dates
- 29 September 1908: Station opens
- 28 July 1952: Station closes
Location

Laxfield railway station was a station located in Laxfield, Suffolk. It was the eastern passenger terminus of the Mid-Suffolk Light Railway. It was proposed to extend the line to Halesworth but only about mile beyond the station was built, to Cratfield, which was only used for goods trains. Laxfield Station opened on 29 September 1908, and closed on 28 July 1952, 44 years after it had opened for passenger traffic. The station building has been moved to and restored at the Mangapps Railway Museum.

Preceding station	Disused railways	Following station
Wilby; Line and station closed	Mid-Suffolk Light Railway	Terminus
