= Thomas Mortimer =

English soldier and statesman (c. 1350–1399)

Lord Deputy of Ireland
- In office 1382–1383
- Succeeded by: Thomas FitzGerald, 7th Earl of Kildare

Personal details
- Born: c.1350
- Died: 1399 (aged 48–49) Scotland
- Spouse: Agnes de Poynings
- Parent: Roger Mortimer, 2nd Earl of March (father)

Sir Thomas Mortimer (c. 1350 – 1399) was a medieval English soldier and statesman who served briefly in several important administrative and judicial state offices in Ireland and played a part in the opposition to the government of King Richard II. He was an illegitimate member of the Mortimer family, who were one of the leading noble houses of England and Ireland, and he helped to manage the Mortimer lands during the minority of the family heir, his nephew Roger, earl of March. Sir Thomas was also a close associate of the Lords Appellant, the powerful faction of nobles who opposed the administration of King Richard II.

Sir Thomas took part in the Lords Appellants' rebellion in 1387 against the King, and fought at the Battle of Radcot Bridge, during which he killed Sir Thomas Molineux, one of the royal commanders. Ten years later, when the King took his revenge against the rebels, this act led to his conviction for treason. He fled for his life and died in exile.

== Background ==
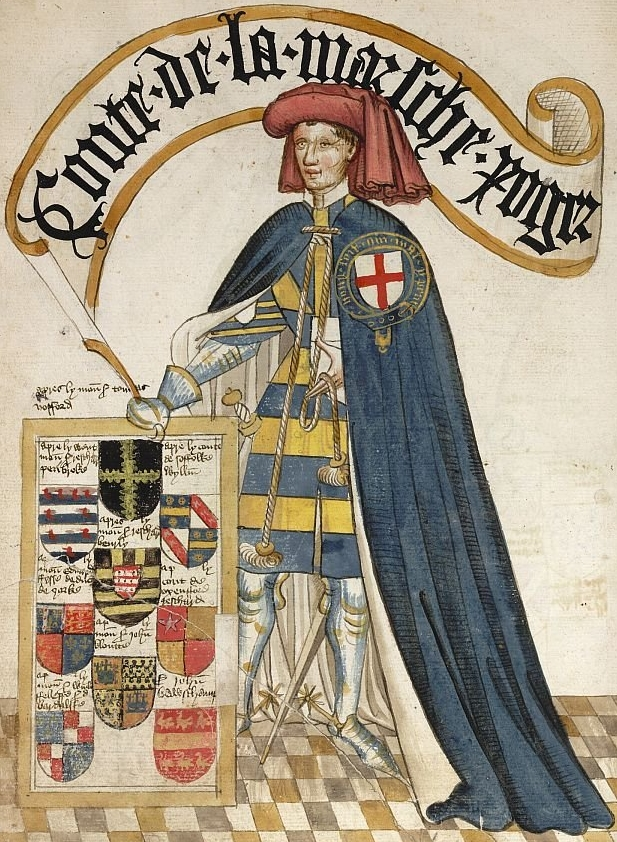
Thomas's father, Roger, 2nd Earl of March

Thomas was an illegitimate son of Roger Mortimer, 2nd Earl of March (1328–1360). He was described as an esquire in 1367, pointing to a birth date of around 1350. He seems to have been treated by his father and his brother very much as one of the family. Nothing is known of his mother.

By 1380, he had acquired considerable military expertise, and had been knighted. When his legitimate brother Edmund Mortimer, 3rd Earl of March was made Lord Lieutenant of Ireland in 1379, Thomas went with him to Ireland and acted as his Deputy, holding in his name a Great Council at Clonmel. Edmund was charged with the task of subduing the Gaelic clans in Ulster and Munster, but he had only limited success in this task.

== Lord Deputy of Ireland ==
Edmund's sudden death in December 1381 left the Dublin Government in a quandary since there were very few men willing or qualified to assume the office of Lord Lieutenant, at a time of exceptional political turbulence in Ireland. Richard Wyre, Bishop of Cloyne, proposed that Thomas Mortimer should be appointed Lord Lieutenant, both for his military experience and his ability to retain the loyalty of his brother's retinue. In the event King Richard II appointed Thomas's nephew, Roger Mortimer, 4th Earl of March, a child of seven, as Lord Lieutenant. The obvious absurdity of this choice was lessened to some extent by the appointment of Thomas as Lord Deputy and Lord Chief Justice.

== Return to England ==
On the appointment of Sir Philip Courtenay as Lord Lieutenant of Ireland in February 1383, Thomas returned to England. His nephew's wardship had been entrusted to a group of magnates which included Richard FitzAlan, 4th Earl of Arundel, of whom Thomas was an intimate friend. It was probably Arundel who appointed Thomas to the position of steward of the Mortimer estates during Roger's minority, thus greatly enhancing his political standing. As Roger grew older he and his uncle became close, going hunting together and exchanging gifts of wine: Dunn suggests that Thomas was the closest Roger ever knew to a father.

== The Appellants ==
Arundel was a key member of the group of nobles called the Lords Appellant, who had emerged as opponents of Richard II and the royal favourite Robert de Vere, Duke of Ireland. Mortimer was closely associated with them and is known to have visited Arundel's house regularly during 1387, the critical year in the Appellants' rise to power.

=== The Battle of Radcot Bridge ===
In December 1387, at Radcot Bridge, the Appellants clashed with the royal army, headed by Robert de Vere and Sir Thomas Molineux, Constable of Chester Castle; de Vere was defeated and forced to flee the country. Mortimer himself killed Molineux, who was one of the few casualties of the fight. According to Thomas Walsingham, Molineux, who had attempted to flee, pleaded for his life, but Mortimer pulled off Molineux's helmet and stabbed him in the head with a dagger.

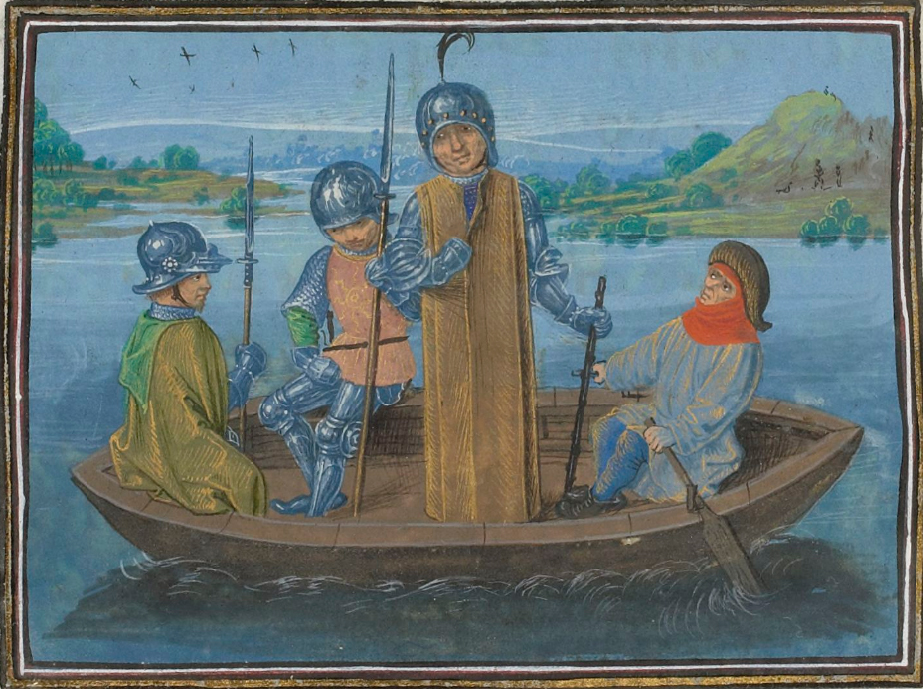
Robert de Vere fleeing after his defeat at the Battle of Radcot Bridge

During the brief rule of the Appellants, Mortimer was in high favour. He was appointed Justiciar of Ireland, but Richard, despite his temporary loss of power, somehow managed to countermand the appointment (no doubt he feared surrendering control of Ireland entirely to his enemies) and it never took effect. Despite the King's mistrust of them, Thomas and his nephew Roger, with troops, accompanied him on his Irish expedition in 1394; and when Roger was reappointed Lord Lieutenant in 1396, Thomas went to Ireland with him.

== Downfall ==
In 1397 the King moved to destroy the surviving Lords Appellant. Arundel, Mortimer's patron, was convicted of treason and executed. Mortimer was "appealed for" (i.e. charged with) treason, in that his killing of Sir Thomas Molineux, the King's commander ten years earlier was deemed in law to be an attempt to murder the King himself. Mortimer was not permitted to stand trial, but was ordered to surrender himself within three months. Unsurprisingly Mortimer instead chose to flee the country: the King accused Roger, probably with good reason, of conniving at his uncle's escape. Thomas was declared a traitor and his lands were forfeited to the Crown. He took refuge in Scotland, where he probably died in 1399.

== Marriage ==
He married Agnes de Poynings, daughter of Michael de Poynings, 1st Baron Poynings and his wife Joan Ruxley, and widow of William Bardolf, 4th Baron Bardolf. They had no children. She was described as a widow on 9 January 1403, indicating that Sir Thomas Mortimer was dead by then. She died the following summer.

== Character ==
Although the details (if they were accurately reported) of his killing of Sir Thomas Molineux show him in a rather sinister light, Mortimer had the respect and esteem of many who knew him, including his brother and his nephew. The chronicler Adam of Usk, who knew him personally, praised him as "a vigorous knight" (although Adam was hostile to King Richard, which no doubt affected his view of Richard's opponents).

== Footnotes ==
Political offices
Vacant	Lord Deputy of Ireland; 1382–1383	Vacant Title next held by The Earl of Kildare
Legal offices
Preceded by John Keppock	Lord Chief Justice of Ireland; 1382–1384	Succeeded by John de Sotheron
