= William Hughes (bishop of St Asaph) =

Welsh bishop

William Hughes (died 1600) was a Welsh bishop of St Asaph.

== Life ==
He was the son of Hugh ap Kynric of Carnarvonshire, and Gwenllian, daughter of John Vychan ab John ab Gruffydd ab Owen Pygott. He matriculated as a sizar of Queens' College, Cambridge, in November 1554 and took his B.A. degree in 1557. He became fellow of Christ's College, Cambridge 1557, M.A. 1560, B.D. 1565, and that year was appointed Lady Margaret preacher.

About 1560 Hughes became chaplain to Thomas Howard, 4th Duke of Norfolk. Attending his patron to Oxford in 1568, he was on 19 April incorporated B.D. of the university, and in 1570, through the influence of the duke, he was allowed to proceed D.D. Behind the scenes, however, there had been a theological wrangle. In 1567 Hughes preached at Leicester, and gave offence by his exposition of the article De Descensu Christi ad Inferos (Article III of the Thirty Nine Articles). A complaint was made to the university. On 7 July 1567 a decree of the senate was issued referring the matter to a committee, Hughes to be bound by its decision without appeal. In the same month another complaint was sent through the Earl of Leicester of Hughes's doctrines. At the earl's suggestion the matter was left to him, Sir William Cecil, then chancellor of the university, and Archbishop Matthew Parker. Parker advised that he should be restrained from preaching; but the concrete result was an order of the chancellor against questioning the article. The Earl of Leicester exerted himself to get Hughes, to recant, which the University of Oxford had failed to do; and after that the way was cleared for Hughes to gain his higher degree of D.D. at Cambridge as well as Oxford.

From 1567 to his death Hughes was rector of Llysvaen in Carnarvonshire. He was also rector of Dennington, Suffolk, but resigned the benefice before 10 December 1573. In December 1573 Hughes was made Bishop of St Asaph.

Hughes gave assistance to William Morgan in his translation of the Bible into Welsh; and made an issue of having Welsh-speaking priests. On the other hand, his administration of his diocese became the subject of an inquiry. The report dated 24 February 1587, described the bishop as holding in commendam, with the archdeaconry and the rectory of Llysvaen, which he held by virtue of a faculty obtained in 1573, 15 livings. He had leased out parts of the bishopric, as lordships, manors, and rectories. The bishop was further charged with extorting money from his clergy on his visitations.

In October 1600 Hughes died, and was buried in the choir of St Asaph Cathedral. By his wife Lucia, daughter of Robert Knowesley of Denbighshire, he left a son, William, and a daughter, Anne, who married Thomas, youngest son of Sir Thomas Mostyn.

== Notes ==
Attribution

This article incorporates text from a publication now in the public domain: Lee, Sidney, ed. (1891). "Hughes, William (d.1600)". Dictionary of National Biography. Vol. 28. London: Smith, Elder & Co.
