= Roger Damory =

English noble

Roger Damory, Baron Damory (died 13 or 14 March 1322) was a nobleman and Constable of Corfe Castle.

== Ancestry ==
He was the younger son of Sir Robert Damory, Knight, of Bucknell and Woodperry, Oxfordshire. Roger Damory also possessed in his own right the manors of Bletchington and Holton, Oxfordshire, Standon in Hertfordshire, Caythorpe in Lincolnshire, and Knaresborough and St. Briavels' castles.

== Service ==
Roger Damory fought at the Battle of Bannockburn where he provided "good services", following which he was granted the manors of Sandal, Yorkshire and Vauxhall, Surrey, in 1317.

He was summoned to Parliament on 20 November 1317, and again in the 11th (1318), 12th (1319), 13th (1320), and 14th (1321) years of the reign of King Edward II, whereby he is held to have become Baron Damory.

== Rebellion and death ==
Roger Damory had been a favourite of King Edward II of England until he was displaced by Hugh Despenser the Younger. He took an active part in the Despenser War in 1321–1322 and was one of the principals in this affair. He captured Gloucester, burnt Bridgnorth, was at the siege of Tickhill and the battle at Burton-on-Trent. As a result, his lands were confiscated and orders were issued for his arrest.

Retreating before the King's forces, being either sick or wounded he was left behind at Tutbury Castle, Staffordshire, where he was captured on 11 March 1322. He was quickly tried and condemned to death. It appears, however, that his illness beat the executioner as he died there "of illness" two or three days later, and was buried at St. Mary's, Ware, Hertfordshire.

== Marriage and issue ==
Roger Damory married shortly before 3 May 1317 Elizabeth de Clare, being her third husband. They had one child:

- Elizabeth Damory (born shortly before 23 May 1318 – 5 February 1361) who married John Bardolf, 3rd Baron Bardolf (1311–1363) and was mother to William Bardolf, 4th Baron Bardolf (1349–1386).

== Bibliography ==
- Lodge, John, Keeper of the Rolls, &c., The Peerage of Ireland, Dublin, 1789, p. 124.
- Banks, Sir T.C., Bt., Baronia Anglica Concentrata; or Baronies in Fee, London, 1844, p. 176.
- Burke, John; Burke, Bernard, eds. (1851). The Royal Families of England, Scotland, and Wales, with their descendants, Sovereigns and Subjects. Vol. 2. London. p. pedigree CXVII.
- Waters, Robert, BA., Barrister of the Inner Temple, Genealogical Memoirs of the Extinct Family of Chester of Chicheley &c., London, 1878, vol.1, p. 140.
- Burke, Sir Bernard, ed. (1883). Dormant, Abeyant, Forfeited and Extinct Peerages. London. pp. 5, 6, and 120.
- Weis, Fredk., Lewis, et al., The Magna Charta Sureties 1215, 5th edition, Baltimore, 2002, p. 49.
- Richardson, Douglas, Plantagenet Ancestry, Baltimore, Md., 2004, p. 167.
