= William Bardolf (baron) =

English medieval baron

William Bardolf (died before 5 January 1276) was an English landowner, courtier, soldier and royal official.

== Origins ==
Born in or before 1206, he was the son and heir of Doun Bardolf (died 1205), a landowner at Shelford in Nottinghamshire and his wife Beatrice Warenne (died 1214), daughter and heiress of the justice William Warenne who held lands at Wormegay in Norfolk. After his possibly posthumous birth, his widowed mother married a second husband named Ralph, whose last name is unknown and who died in about 1210. Her third husband was Hubert de Burgh (died 1243), with whom she had two more sons.

== Career ==
Although recognised as heir to his mother's lands in 1215, he was unable to gain control of them until 1243, when his stepfather died. After being in attendance on King Henry III when visiting France in 1230, he led the military expedition to the island of Lundy in 1242 which captured the pirate William de Marisco and his fellow outlaws. He was in the King's service in 1242 during campaigns in Wales and Scotland and in 1255 accompanied Eleanor, the queen consort, to France. These decades of service to the Crown brought him rewards in money and prestige, such as grants of free warren and the right to hold fairs and markets in his manors, together with favourable terms for settlement of debts to the king.

In the political crisis of 1258, however, he switched to the baronial opposition, being chosen at the parliament of Oxford as one of the twelve baronial members of the council of twenty-four appointed to reform the realm, and under the Provisions of Oxford was made Constable of Nottingham Castle, In 1259 he was elected to the parliamentary committee of twelve and in 1261 was using his local influence in Norfolk to obstruct the work of the king's sheriff. As one of the barons who accepted the arbitration of King Louis IX of France in 1263, he was one of their sureties for observing the resulting settlement, known as the Mise of Amiens, But when the Second Barons' War broke out in 1264 and the rebel side lost the Battle of Northampton, he switched to the king's side and, fighting for him at the subsequent Battle of Lewes, was captured by the baronial side that he had just deserted. After peace was agreed in 1267, he received few rewards from the victorious king.

He died shortly before 5 January 1276, being succeeded by his son.

== Family ==
By 1230 he was married to Nichola, whose last name is unknown, and their only known child had probably been born. This was his son William Bardolf (died 1289), who married Juliana Gournay and was father of Hugh Bardolf, created first Baron Bardolf in 1299.
