= Bucknell, Oxfordshire =

Village in Oxfordshire, England

Coordinates: 51.927°N 1.186°W

Bucknell
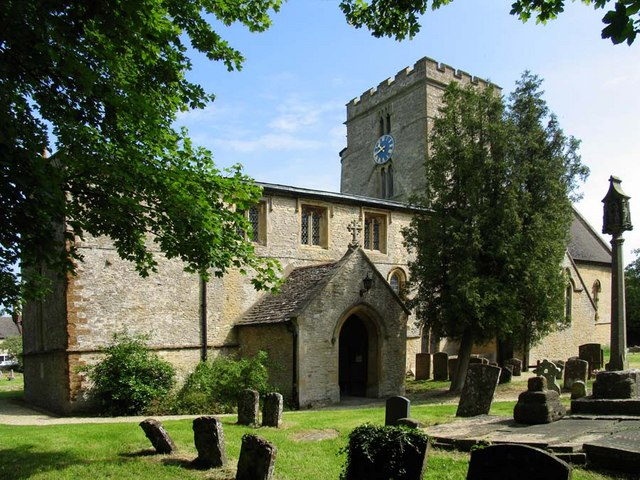
- St Peter's parish church

- Location within Oxfordshire
- Area: 8.50 km^{2} (3.28 sq mi)
- Population: 260 (2011 census)
  - Density: 31/km^{2} (80/sq mi)
- OS grid reference: SP5625
- Civil parish: Bucknell
- District: Cherwell
- Shire county: Oxfordshire
- Region: South East
- Country: England
- Sovereign state: United Kingdom
- Post town: Bicester
- Postcode district: OX27
- Dialling code: 01869
- Police: Thames Valley
- Fire: Oxfordshire
- Ambulance: South Central
- UK Parliament: Bicester and Woodstock
- Website: Bucknell Matters

Bucknell is a village and civil parish 2 1/2 miles (4 km) northwest of Bicester in Oxfordshire, England. The 2011 census recorded the parish's population as 260.

== Manor ==
After the Norman Conquest of England, William the Conqueror granted the Manor of Bucknell to Robert D'Oyly. In 1300 the Lord of the Manor of Bucknell was Sir Robert d'Amory, father of Roger d'Amory.

The present manor house is early 17th century, but was mostly rebuilt in the 19th century.

== Parish church ==
The Church of England parish church of Saint Peter has a central Norman tower. The nave and chancel were enlarged in the 13th century and are Early English Gothic. In the 15th century the bell stage was added to the bell tower and the Perpendicular Gothic clerestory was added to the nave. St Peter's is a Grade I listed building.

In 1552 St Peter's had three bells plus a Sanctus bell. In 1955 it still had three bells, but the earliest was cast in 1597. The church's turret clock is of unknown date, but appears to be late 17th or early 18th century.

St Peter's parish is now part of the Benefice of Bicester, Bucknell, Caversfield and Launton.

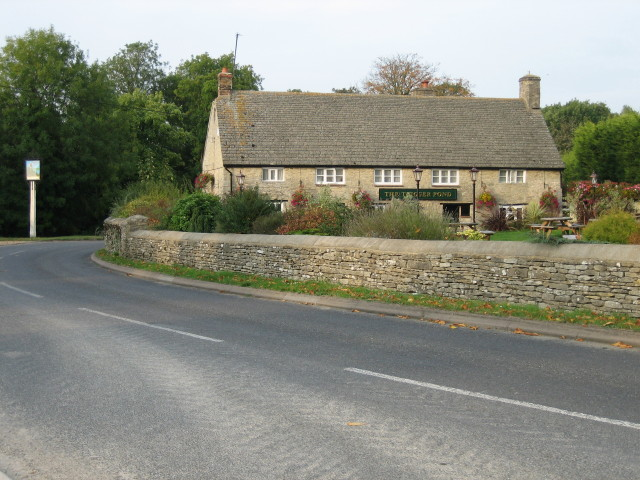
The Trigger Pond pub

== Amenities ==
The Sky Wave Distillery (then known as the Bucknell Distillery), an artisan micro-distillery which makes Sky Wave Gin, was founded in the village in 2018 before moving to Bicester Heritage at Bicester Airfield in 2021. Sky Wave's London Dry Gin was named The World's Best Contemporary London Dry Gin at the 2020 World Gin Awards.

The Trigger Pond pub in Bucknell is 17th-century. The earliest part of the building dates from 1637, and the later part has a date stone from 1693. It is now controlled by Wadworth Brewery.

== Water tower ==
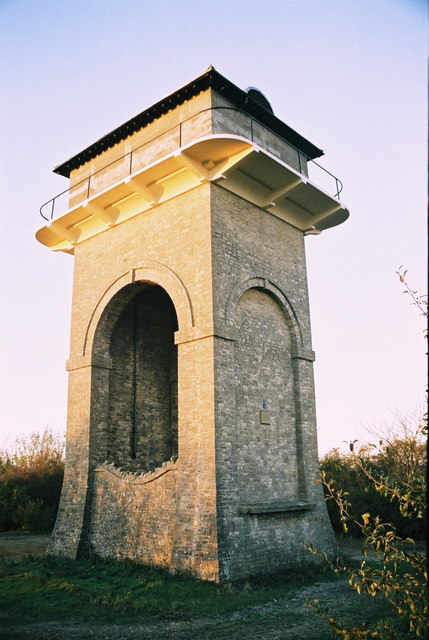
Trow Pool water tower

Trow Pool water tower was built in 1909 for Major Hunloke, who then held Bucknell Manor. It served Bucknell village and the Manor estate until the 1950s, when mains water reached Bucknell. The M40 motorway was built through the parish and opened in 1991. It passes very close to the water tower, which is now a landmark for motorway traffic.

== Sources ==
- Beeson, C.F.C. (1989) [1962]. Simcock, A.V. (ed.). Clockmaking in Oxfordshire 1400–1850 (3rd ed.). Oxford: Museum of the History of Science. p. 163. ISBN 0-903364-06-9.
- Lobel, Mary D, ed. (1959). A History of the County of Oxford. Victoria County History. Vol. 6: Ploughley Hundred. London: Oxford University Press for the Institute of Historical Research. pp. 71–80.
- Sherwood, Jennifer; Pevsner, Nikolaus (1974). Oxfordshire. The Buildings of England. Harmondsworth: Penguin Books. pp. 500–501. ISBN 0-14-071045-0.
