= The Swan Inn, Worlingworth =

Pub in Worlingworth, Suffolk

Coordinates: 52°16′03″N 1°15′29″E

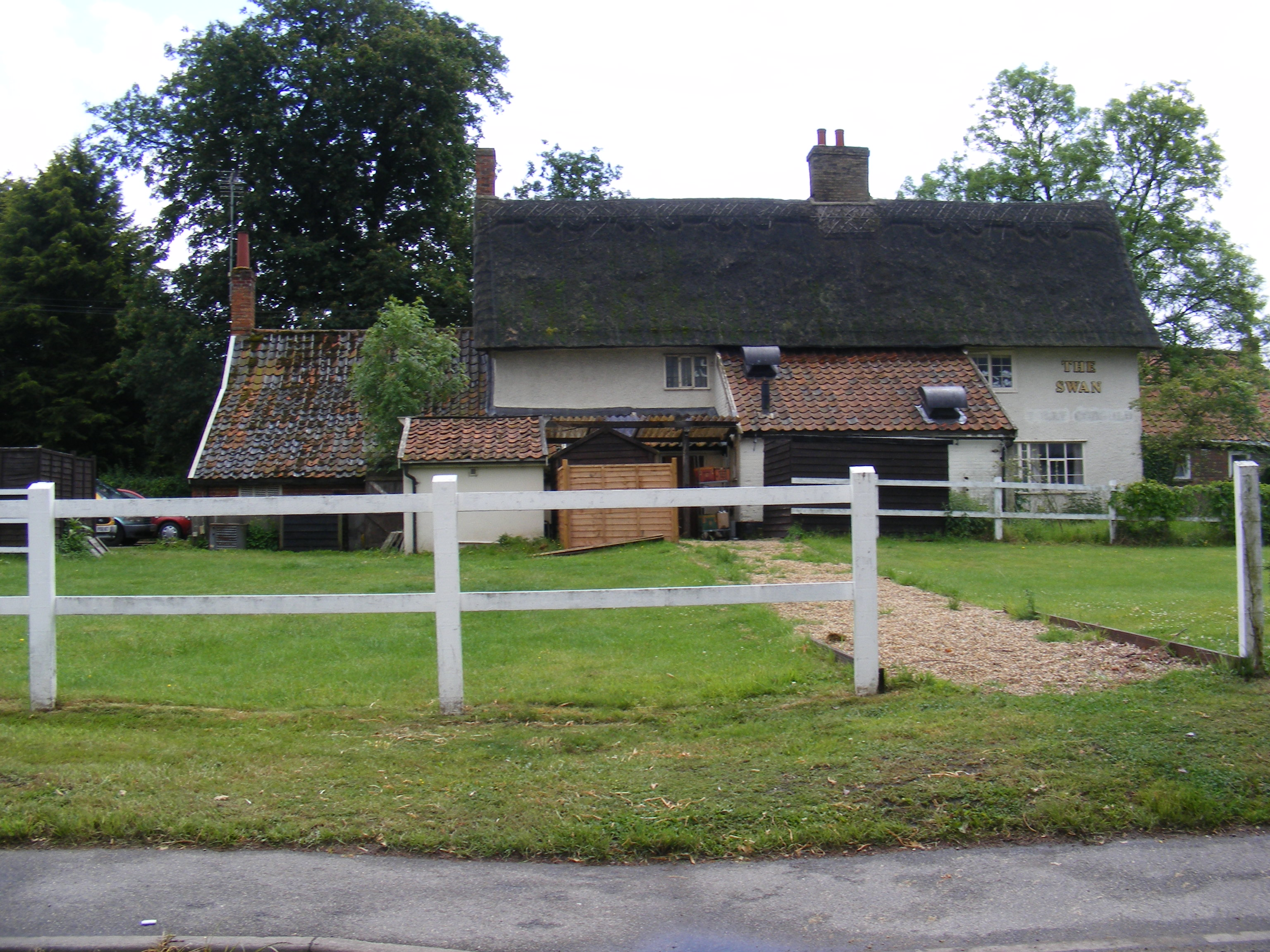
The Swan Inn

The Swan Inn is a public house in the village of Worlingworth, Suffolk, England. It is a Grade II listed building.

By the end of the eighteenth century the Swan had become a focal point of community life in Worlingworth. It had gained a reputation for hosting sports, games, and other amusements as well as providing avenue for other social or business occasions.

While Robert Chaplin was landlord, the Inn hosted the first committee meeting of the Loyal Worlingworth Volunteers on 15 May 1798. This was attended by John Henniker-Major.
