= Dennington =

Village in Suffolk, England

Coordinates: 52.254558°N 1.342157°E

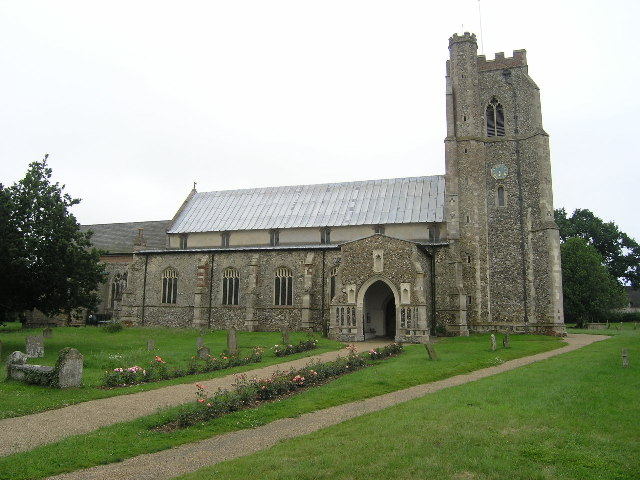
- Church of St Mary, Dennington

- Location within Suffolk
- Area: 13.24 km^{2} (5.11 sq mi)
- Population: 578 (2019)
  - Density: 44/km^{2} (110/sq mi)
- OS grid reference: TM283634
- District: East Suffolk
- Shire county: Suffolk
- Region: East
- Country: England
- Sovereign state: United Kingdom
- Post town: WOODBRIDGE
- Postcode district: IP13
- Dialling code: 01728
- UK Parliament: Central Suffolk and North Ipswich

Dennington is a village and civil parish in the English county of Suffolk. It is 2 miles (3.2 km) north of Framlingham and 15 miles (24 km) north-east of Ipswich in the east of the county. It lies along the A1120 road around 8 miles (13 km) west of the road's junction with the main A12 road in Yoxford.

At the 2011 census Dennington had a population of 578. The parish church is dedicated to St Mary. The village has a primary school, village hall and pub.

There is a limited public school bus service linking Dennington to Framlingham and Ipswich. The nearest railway station is at Darsham with an hourly service to either Ipswich or Lowestoft.

== Notable residents ==
- Sir William Phelip, 6th Baron Bardolf (?-1441), Treasurer of the Household, Lord Chamberlain and hero of the Battle Of Agincourt buried in the south chapel of St Mary's Church Dennington.
- Sir Edmund Rous (by 1521 – 1572 or later), landowner, magistrate, Member of Parliament for Great Bedwyn, Dunwich, Dover, and Vice-Treasurer of Ireland.
- William Hughes (?-1600), rector of Dennington and later Bishop of St Asaph from 1573 till his death.
- Lionel Gatford (?-1665), royalist Church of England clergyman and rector of Dennington.
- William Miller (1769 – 1844); leading English publisher.
- Benjamin Philpot (1790–1889); clergyman and Archdeacon of Man from 1832 until 1839.
- Charles Hotham (1806–1855), Lieutenant-Governor and, later, Governor of Victoria, Australia.
- George Burr (1819–1857), first-class cricketer and Anglican priest.
- Peter Hartley (1909–1994); clergyman and Archdeacon of Suffolk from 1970 to 1975.
- General Sir Alfred Dudley Ward (1905–1991), British Army officer who saw distinguished active service during the Second World War and later became Governor of Gibraltar, is buried in the churchyard of St Mary's.
- Ed Sheeran (born 1991), singer–songwriter, resides in Dennington.
