= Battle of Bramham Moor =

Final battle in the Percy Rebellion

Coordinates: 53°51′52″N 1°20′29″W

- Part of The Percy Rebellion
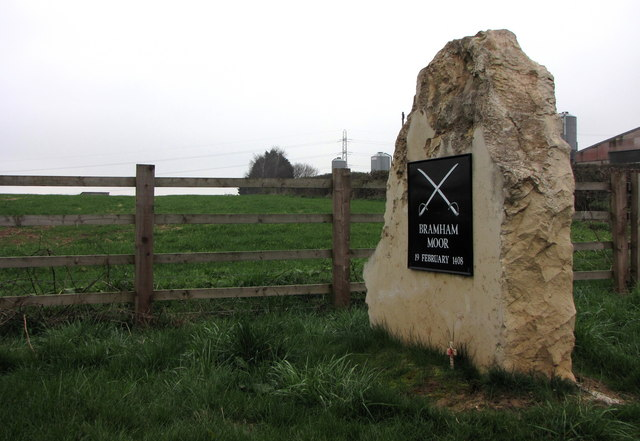
Date	19 February 1408
Location	Bramham Moor, Yorkshire, England
Result	Royalist victory

Belligerents
Kingdom of England	House of Percy

Commanders and leaders
Sir Thomas Rokeby	Earl of Northumberland †; Baron Bardolf †

Strength
Unknown, small	Unknown, small

Casualties and losses
Unknown, light	Almost total

The Battle of Bramham Moor on 19 February 1408 was the final battle in the Percy Rebellion of 1402 – 1408, which pitted Henry Percy, 1st Earl of Northumberland, head of the rich and influential Percy family, against the usurper King of England, Henry IV. The Percys had previously supported Henry in his coup d'etat against his cousin King Richard II in 1399.

== Rebellion ==
King Henry IV and Henry Percy, 1st Earl of Northumberland had fallen out in the aftermath of the Battle of Homildon Hill in 1402, a victory by an English force led by Northumberland over an invading Scottish army. This resulted in the capture of a large number of Scottish nobles. As was the tradition of the day, a captured nobleman could buy his freedom through a ransom and Northumberland stood to make a large sum of money from his success. However, King Henry was suffering a financial crisis due to the chaotic state of affairs following his coup to seize the throne, wars in Wales and Scotland and the disobedience of several parts of England and Wales still loyal to the deposed (and murdered) Richard II.

Seeking to safeguard his ailing Treasury and also to impose his authority on the county of Northumberland, which was ruled as almost a private fief by the Percys, King Henry demanded the handover of the hostages offering only token payment in return. Northumberland, infuriated, declared his support for Edmund Mortimer, 5th Earl of March, who had been more directly in line than Henry at the usurpation.

Northumberland marched against Henry but in the 1403 Battle of Shrewsbury he was defeated and his son Henry Hotspur killed. Retreating to Scotland, Northumberland emerged again in 1405 to a further defeat, before attempting one last time to seize the throne in 1408 gathering together an army of Lowland Scots and loyal Northumbrians and marching south toward York.

== Bramham Moor ==
At Bramham Moor, south of Wetherby, Northumberland‘s army was met by a force of local Yorkshire levies and noble retinues which had been hastily assembled, led by the High Sheriff of Yorkshire Sir Thomas Rokeby. The exact sizes and compositions of the contending armies are not known, but the armies were far smaller than the thousands who had gathered at Shrewsbury, the rebels failing to gain widespread support or receive aid from other rebellious factions, such as Wales, where Owain Glyndŵr's rebellion was collapsing.

The course of the battle itself is not well documented either. The action seemingly followed the course of many medieval battles where armies and generals were evenly matched: a violent melee in the centre of the field, with little tactical direction. Northumberland is said to have positioned his men carefully and awaited Rokeby's arrival at 2:00 pm, when battle was instantly joined. It is likely that, as with other battles of the era between primarily English and Scottish forces, the outcome was largely decided by English use of the longbow to thin the enemy ranks before charging with their main body.

After the battle, a number of the rebels were executed, including the Abbot of Hailes (near Gloucester), who was dressed in full armour. The Bishop of Bangor was spared because he was wearing his vestments.

== Aftermath ==
Northumberland was defeated, and the Earl himself died fighting a furious rearguard action as his army was routed. His ally Bardolf was mortally wounded early in the action and later died. Very few of his soldiers escaped the pursuit and returned to Scotland. Northumberland’s body was hanged, drawn, and quartered; his head was placed on London Bridge, with other parts of his anatomy displayed elsewhere (as was the custom at the time for people who were deemed to be traitors). Eventually the parts of his body were reunited in his burial in York Minster.

The Bardolf estates were forfeited, and the power of the Percy family was shattered. The north of England became the domain of their political rivals, the Neville family, whose leader Ralph Neville had become a preferred royal ally and was strengthened by being created Earl of Westmoreland. The Percys would later make a comeback and regain their previous standing during the Wars of the Roses. A cross was erected on the supposed spot where Northumberland fell, the base of which was removed to the entrance of a wood lying close to Toulston Lane. In 2008 a memorial stone and an information board were erected on Paradise Way, Bramham, by Bramham Parish Council and formally opened by the 12th Duke of Northumberland, to commemorate the 600th anniversary.

The battlefield site is 1.2 miles (2 km) south of Bramham and 3.5 miles (5.6 km) west of Tadcaster.
