= William Bardolf, 4th Baron Bardolf =

William Bardolf, 4th Baron Bardolf and 3rd Baron Damory (21 October 1349 – 29 January 1386) of Wormegay, Norfolk, was an extensive landowner in Norfolk, Lincolnshire, Suffolk and Surrey. He was the son of John Bardolf, 3rd Baron Bardolf and Elizabeth Damory, suo jure 2nd Baroness Damory. His maternal grandparents were Sir Roger Damory, Lord Damory and Lady Elizabeth de Clare, a granddaughter of King Edward I. In 1372, Bardolf had livery of his lands from the Crown.

He was summoned to parliament from 20 January 1376 to 3 September 1385, as "William Bardolf of Wormegay". He served in the French and Irish wars, latterly under John of Gaunt, Duke of Lancaster.

== Family ==
He married Agnes (d. 12 June 1403), daughter of Sir Michael de Poynings, 1st Baron Poynings, Kt., of Bures (1317–1369) (considered 2nd Baron by older laws) and his wife Joan Ruxley, widow of John de Moleyns. Coppinger wrote: "Sir Michael de Poynings, 2nd Baron, gave a thousand marks to Queen Philippa in 1366 for the wardship and marriage of William, son and heir of John Lord Bardolf, to the end that he might take Agnes his daughter to wife, who by the name of 'Agnes Bardolf' is mentioned as a legatee in the will of her mother, Joane Lady Poynings dated 12th May 1369 and by that of 'Lady Bardolf my sister' in the will of Thomas Lord Poynings 28th October 1374".

Lord Bardolf and his wife had two sons and two daughters:

- Thomas Bardolf, 5th Baron Bardolf
- William Bardolf
- Cecily Bardolf (d. 1432) married Sir Brian Stapleton, of Ingham (1379–1438), Sheriff of Norfolk, a veteran of the Battle of Agincourt, and had issue Sir Miles Stapleton.
- Elizabeth Bardolf, wife of Robert Scales, 5th Lord Scales and secondly Sir Henry Percy, son of Sir Thomas Percy and Elizabeth Strabolgi.

Bardolf died in 1385, aged 36, and was succeeded by his son, Thomas Bardolf, 5th Baron Bardolf. His widow remarried Sir Thomas Mortimer, illegitimate son of Roger Mortimer, 2nd Earl of March. Thomas was attainted as a traitor in 1397; he fled to Scotland, and died there before May 1399. Agnes died in June 1403.

Peerage of England
Preceded by John Bardolf	Baron Bardolf; 1363–1386	Succeeded by Thomas Bardolf
