= Stradbroke railway station =

Former railway station in England

Stradbroke

General information
- Location: Stradbroke, Mid Suffolk; England
- Coordinates: 52.3093°N 1.2706°E
- Grid reference: TM230729
- Platforms: 1

Other information
- Status: Disused

History
- Original company: Mid-Suffolk Light Railway
- Pre-grouping: Mid-Suffolk Light Railway
- Post-grouping: London and North Eastern Railway; Eastern Region of British Railways

Key dates
- 29 September 1908: Station opens
- 28 July 1952: Station closes
Location

Stradbroke railway station was a station located in Stradbroke, Suffolk, England. It was on the Mid-Suffolk Light Railway between Horham and Wilby. Stradbroke Station opened on 29 September 1908, and closed on 28 July 1952, 44 years after it had opened for passenger traffic. Stradbroke had previously served as one of the railway's original goods stations from the line's freight-only opening in 1904.

| Preceding station | Disused railways | Following station |
|---|---|---|
| Horham; Line and station closed | Mid-Suffolk Light Railway | Wilby; Line and station closed |
