= John Bardolf, 3rd Baron Bardolf =

John Bardolf, 3rd Baron Bardolf, Knight Banneret, (of Wormegay, Norfolk; 13 January 1314 – 29 July 1363), was a baron in the Peerage of England. He was the son of Thomas Bardolf, 2nd Baron Bardolf and Agnes Grandison, thought to be the daughter of William de Grandison, 1st Baron Grandison.

John Bardolf was in his minority when his father died in 1331 and in 1336, upon proof of his age being given, he did homage and was awarded livery of his lands which in addition to Wormegay included the lands and manors of Cantley, & Caistor, Norfolk, Owmby, Lincolnshire, and Addington, Surrey.

He was summoned to parliament from 22 January 1336, to 1 June 1363 by Writs directed to Johanni Bardolf de Wirmegey.

This nobleman participated in the glories of the martial reign of King Edward III, notably in Scotland, Brittany, and even Germany, and attained the dignity of Knight banneret.

== Family ==
He married Elizabeth Damory, daughter and heiress of Sir Roger d'Amory, Lord Damory, whom William Dugdale calls "that great woman", by whom he acquired a considerable accession of landed property. They had two daughters, Agnes and Elizabeth (or Isabel), and one son and heir, William.

John, Lord Bardolf, died at Assisi in Italy, and was succeeded by his son, William Bardolf, 4th Baron Bardolf.

== Notes ==
Peerage of England
Preceded by Thomas Bardolf	Baron Bardolf; 1357–1363	Succeeded by William Bardolf
