= Worlingworth =

Village in Suffolk, England

Coordinates: 52°16′04″N 1°15′30″E

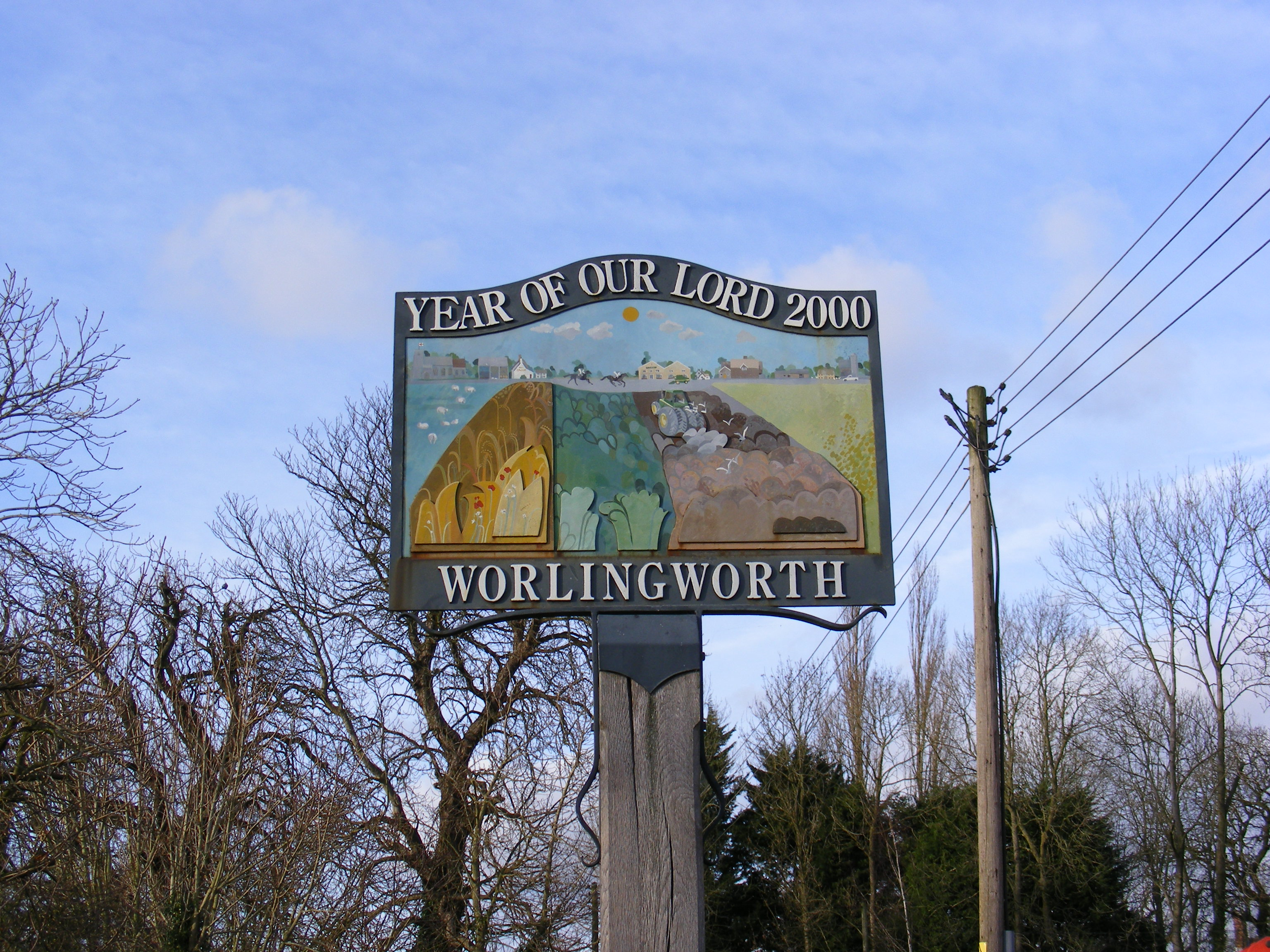
- Worlingworth village sign

- Location within Suffolk
- Area: 10.01 km^{2} (3.86 sq mi)
- Population: 802 (2011)
  - Density: 80/km^{2} (210/sq mi)
- District: Mid Suffolk
- Shire county: Suffolk
- Region: East
- Country: England
- Sovereign state: United Kingdom
- Post town: Woodbridge
- Postcode district: IP13
- Dialling code: 01728
- Police: Suffolk
- Fire: Suffolk
- Ambulance: East of England
- UK Parliament: Central Suffolk and North Ipswich

Worlingworth is a village and civil parish in the Mid Suffolk district of Suffolk in eastern England, located around ten miles south-east of Diss. In 2011 it had a total population of 802 people.

The village has a primary school called Worlingworth CEVC Primary School. The school was judged by Ofsted to be 'Outstanding' in all areas in March 2016. The school's motto is "Cherish All, Achieve Together". The local church of St. Mary is a grade I listed building and the chancel, the oldest surviving part, dates to the late 13th century.

Between 1908 and 1952 the village was served by Worlingworth railway station on the Mid-Suffolk Light Railway.

== History ==
In Old English, the meaning of Worlingworth is an 'enclosure of the followers of Wilhere'. Broken down, 'Wilhere' is a personal name, '-ingas' means 'the people of' or 'the people called after' and 'worð' is for 'an enclosure'.

The Domesday Book of 1086 states Worlingworth to be "quite large", with a population of 32 households, made up from 16 villagers, 14 smallholders, 1 slave and 1 freeman. The livestock of Worlingworth in 1066 included 8 cattle, 24 pigs, 25 sheep, 35 goats and 2 horses, this remained the same by 1086 however the village had gained 6 beehives and lost the 2 horses.

The Swan Inn was originally built shortly before 1550, by Swan Lane.

John Marius Wilson wrote about Worlingworth in 1870 and described it as:

"a parish, with a village, in Hoxne district, Suffolk; 5 miles NW by N of Framlingham r. station. It has a post-office under Wickham-Market. Acres, 2,446. Real property, £4,562. Pop., 740. Houses, 170. The manor, with W. Hall, belongs to Lord Henniker."

In 1801 the village had the facilities of a blacksmith, a wheelwright, a shoemaker, a dressmaker, a brewers and maltsters, a general tradesman, a general store, a beerhouse and coaching inn, a workhouse, a school, a church and a stately hall.

The workhouse was founded in 1730, after the village guild hall was converted. It was able to accommodate 35 people up until it was closed in 1836, shortly after outbreaks of typhus in 1820.

By 2014 the village amenities have changed considerably compared to those available in 1801. There is now a church, a community centre, and a primary school. The village had a public house called The Swan Inn, which closed in 2016. The building is still standing as it is a grade II listed building.

== Demographics ==
=== Population ===
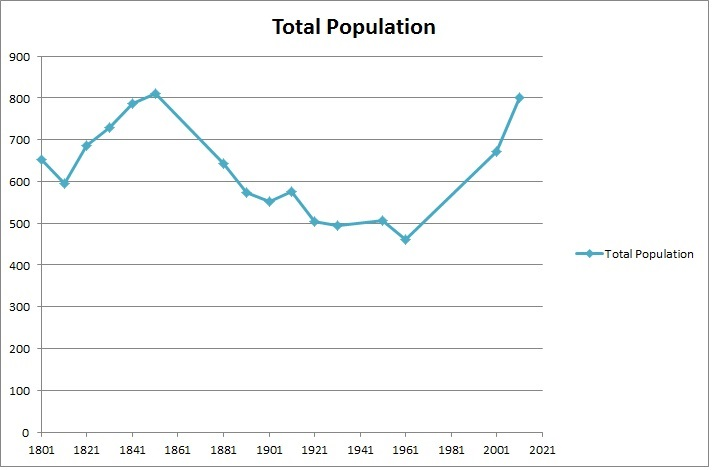
Total Population of Worlingworth Civil Parish, Suffolk, as reported by the Census of Population from 1801 to 2011

The earliest records for population in Worlingworth date back to the 1801 census where there was a total population of 729. There has been a steady decline in Worlingworth's total population from 1851 where the population total was 811 to 460 in 1961, possibly due to the migration of people and families to towns or cities to find work in factories rather than as farm labourers. By 2011 the population had increased to 802, and was made up of 390 females and 412 males.

In 1831 the majority of Worlingworth's population, 78 people, were classed as Labourers and Servants, the lowest social class, compared to just 27 people who were in the highest being Employers and Professionals. 43 people were of the Middling Sorts which includes masters, skilled workers and small farmers who do not employ labourers and just 21 classified as Other. This suggests that Worlingworth was a small rural community which was strongly based around agriculture.

=== Employment ===
The enumeration of 1831 shows Worlingworth to have a total population of 729, split between 145 families. 86 people were "chiefly employed in agriculture", the biggest employer as only 30 people were working in trade, manufacturing and handicraft and just 29 in other classes.

In the 1881 census, 324 people were counted in the occupation section in Worlingworth. The main occupation for the villagers at this time was in agriculture which employed 103 males, 81 of these worked as an agricultural labourer, farm servant or cottager. 30 females were employed as domestic indoor servants, although the majority of females, 75, were without specified occupations, the second biggest employment sector within Worlingworth in 1881.

The 2001 census shows that there are 487 economically active people, ages 16 to 74, in Worlingworth. The majority, 181 of these were in full-time employment, compared to only 67 who were in part-time employment.

In 2011, the occupations of the villagers was almost equally mixed between employment sectors. The biggest employing sector was Wholesale and Retail Trade which employed 52 people. The second largest sector was Agriculture, Forestry and Fishing which employed 47 people, this includes L.E Tuckwell Ltd. who is an agricultural supplier and a major employer within Worlingworth.

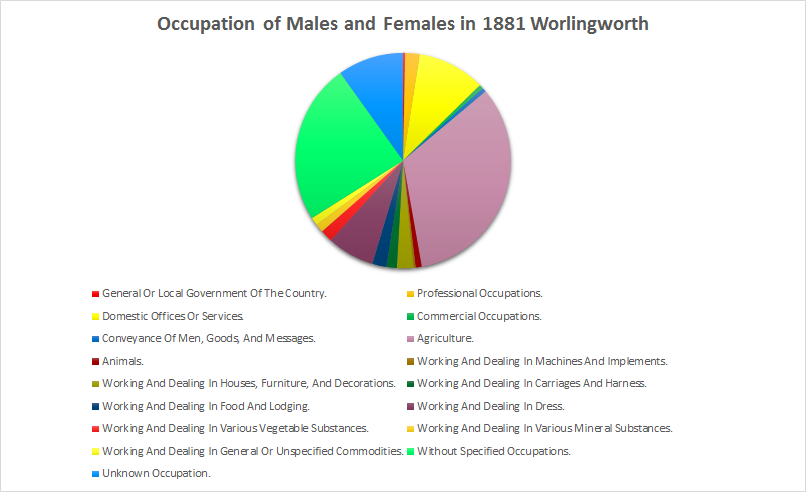
Occupation of Males and Females in Worlingworth, as reported by the 1881 Census

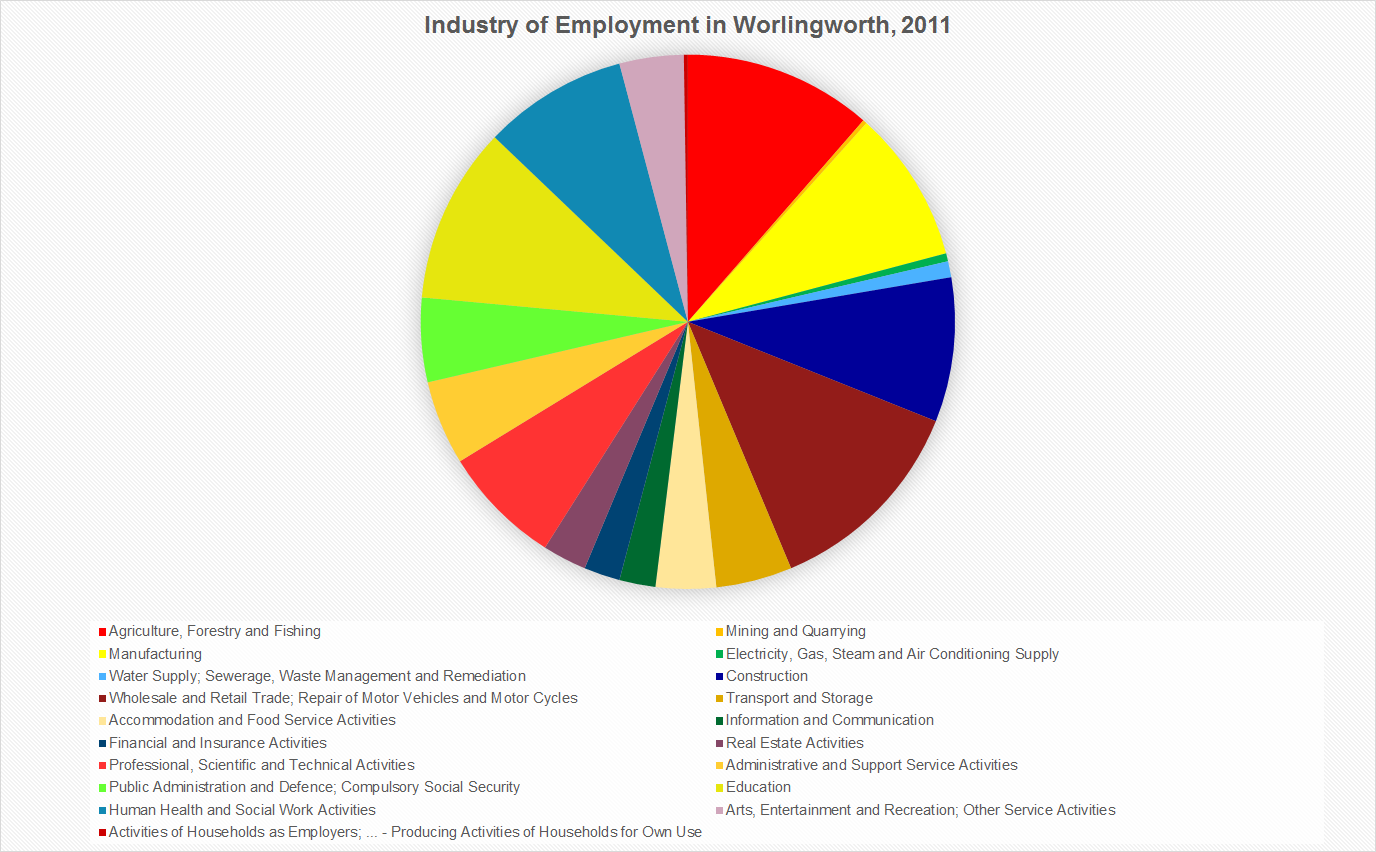
Industry of Employment in Worlingworth from 2011 census on Office for National Statistics, Neighbourhood Statistics

== Notable residents ==
- George Burr (1819–1857), first-class cricketer and Anglican priest
- Frederick Barlee (1827–1884), senior civil servant; Colonial Secretary of Western Australia from 1855 to 1875; Lieutenant-Governor of the British Honduras (now Belize) from 1877 to 1882; and Administrator of Trinidad in 1884
- Edward Lee French (1857–1916), Inspector-General in the Indian Police Force
- Colin Campbell (1863–1916), Anglican priest and inaugural Archdeacon of Wisbech
