= Southolt =

Village in Suffolk, England

Coordinates: 52.273°N 1.198°E

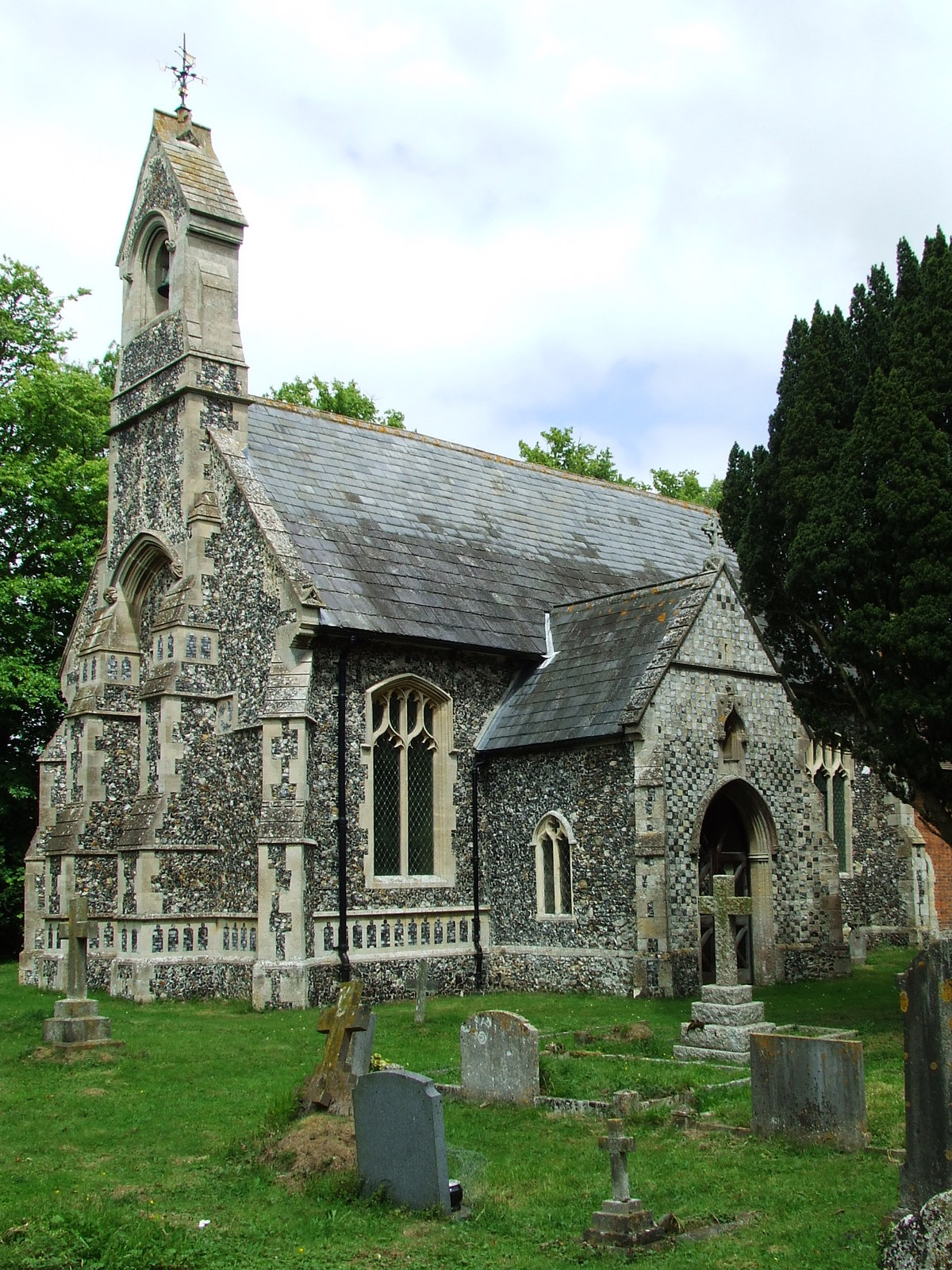
- St Margaret's parish church, seen from the southwest

- Location within Suffolk
- Population: 70
- OS grid reference: TM1968
- Civil parish: Southolt
- District: Mid Suffolk
- Shire county: Suffolk
- Region: East
- Country: England
- Sovereign state: United Kingdom
- Post town: Eye
- Postcode district: IP23
- Dialling code: 01728
- Police: Suffolk
- Fire: Suffolk
- Ambulance: East of England
- UK Parliament: Central Suffolk and North Ipswich

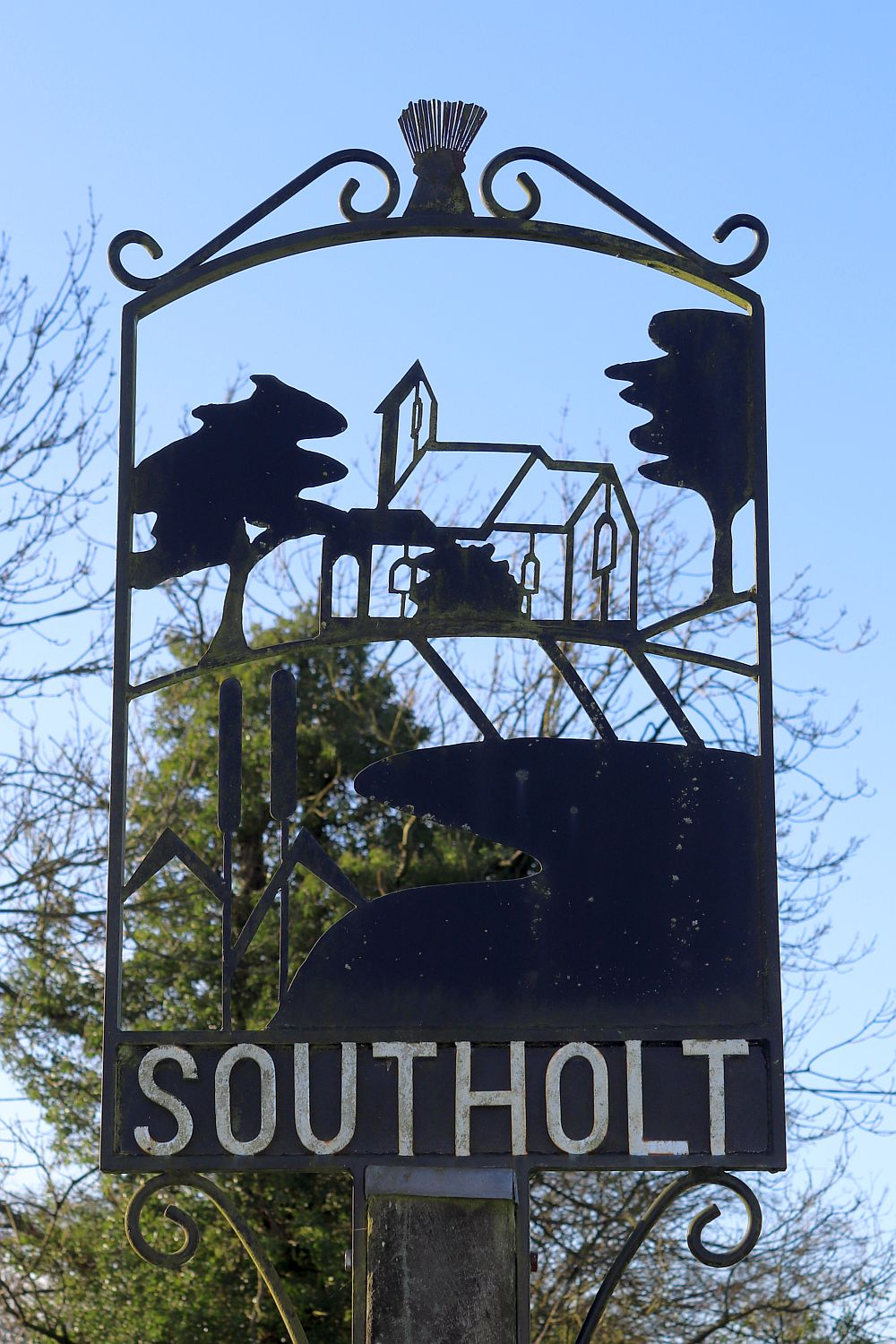
Southolt Village Sign, Suffolk

Southolt is a village and civil parish in Suffolk, about 4 1/2 miles (7 km) southeast of Eye, on the road between Bedingfield and Worlingworth.

== History ==
John Speed recorded the village on his 1610 map as "Southold".

The Plough pub at Southolt Green opened in the 17th century and closed about 1990.

Southolt's population declined greatly in the 20th century, and is now fewer than 70.

== Parish church ==
The Church of England parish church of St Margaret is a 15th-century flint building. Its chancel was rebuilt in brick in 1771. The west end of the nave was rebuilt in 1907. Monuments inside include a brass made in 1585. The building is Grade II* listed.

The Diocese of St Edmundsbury and Ipswich now lets the church to the village on a peppercorn rent. Services are held at least three times a year.

== Bibliography ==
- Pevsner, Nikolaus; Radcliffe, Enid (revision) (1974) [1961]. Suffolk. The Buildings of England. Harmondsworth: Penguin Books. p. 430. ISBN 0-14-071020-5.
