= William Phelip, 6th Baron Bardolf =

English landowner, soldier, politician, and administrator

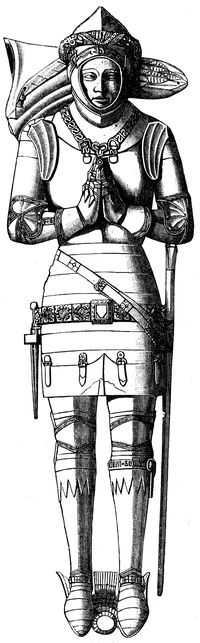
Effigy of William Phelip, Lord Bardolf (died 1441), with the Garter and Lancastrian collar of SS.: from his tomb at Dennington, Suffolk. The type of armour here shown prevailed from about 1415 to 1435.

William Phelip, 6th Baron Bardolf KG (died 6 June 1441), was an English landowner, soldier, politician, and administrator from Dennington in Suffolk.

== Origins ==
He was the elder son of John Phelip (died 1407), a landowner at Dennington in Suffolk, and his second wife Juliana Erpingham (died 1414), daughter of Sir John Erpingham (died 1370) and sister of the soldier and administrator Sir Thomas Erpingham. He had a younger brother Sir John Phelip MP and two sisters: Rose, who married John Glemham, and Catherine who married Sir Andrew Butler MP, of Waldingfield.

== Career ==
He is described as being a valiant soldier in the wars in France during the reign of King Henry V. He became Treasurer of the King's Household, and on the king's decease had the chief conduct of his funeral. He is said to have been created Lord Bardolf by letters patent of King Henry VI, but it does not appear that he ever had a summons to Parliament, although he bore that title. He was later appointed a Knight of the Garter and served as Chamberlain to King Henry VI. By letters patent dated 23 October 1440 Sir William Phelip held the lordship of Horstead Manor.

== Marriage and children ==
He married Joan Bardolf (d.pre-1447), a daughter and co-heiress of Thomas Bardolf, 5th Lord Bardolf. She died before 1447, as in that year the executors of Joan, Lady Bardolf, sold her property of Erpingham manor, in St. Martin's at the Palace, at Norwich, to William Calthorpe. By Joan he left one daughter and sole heiress:

- Elizabeth Phelip, who married John Beaumont, 1st Viscount Beaumont (c.1409-1460), the first Viscount to be created in England, who died at the Battle of Northampton.

== Acquires Bardolf barony and reversion ==
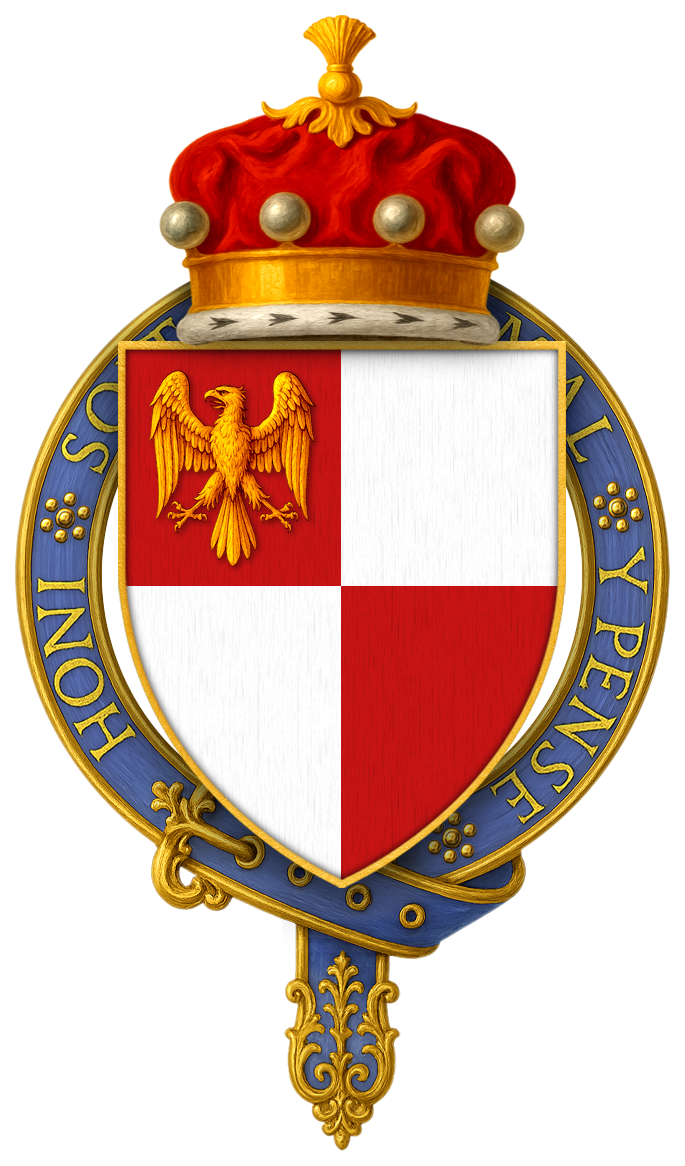
Arms of Sir William Phelip, KG: Quarterly gules and argent, in the first quarter an eagle displayed or

By his marriage to a daughter and co-heiress of the attainted Thomas Bardolf, 5th Lord Bardolf he acquired the title Baron Bardolf. Lord Bardolf's estates had been divided between Thomas Beaufort, 1st Duke of Exeter, the King's half-brother, George de Dunbar, 10th Earl of March, and the Queen, but the latter's share, on petition to the king by the husbands of both his daughters, namely Sir William de Clifford, and his wife Anne Bardolf and of Sir William Phelip and his wife Joan Bardolf, the reversion after the Queen's death was granted to the representatives of the attainted Thomas Bardolf, 5th Lord Bardolf.

== Death and burial ==
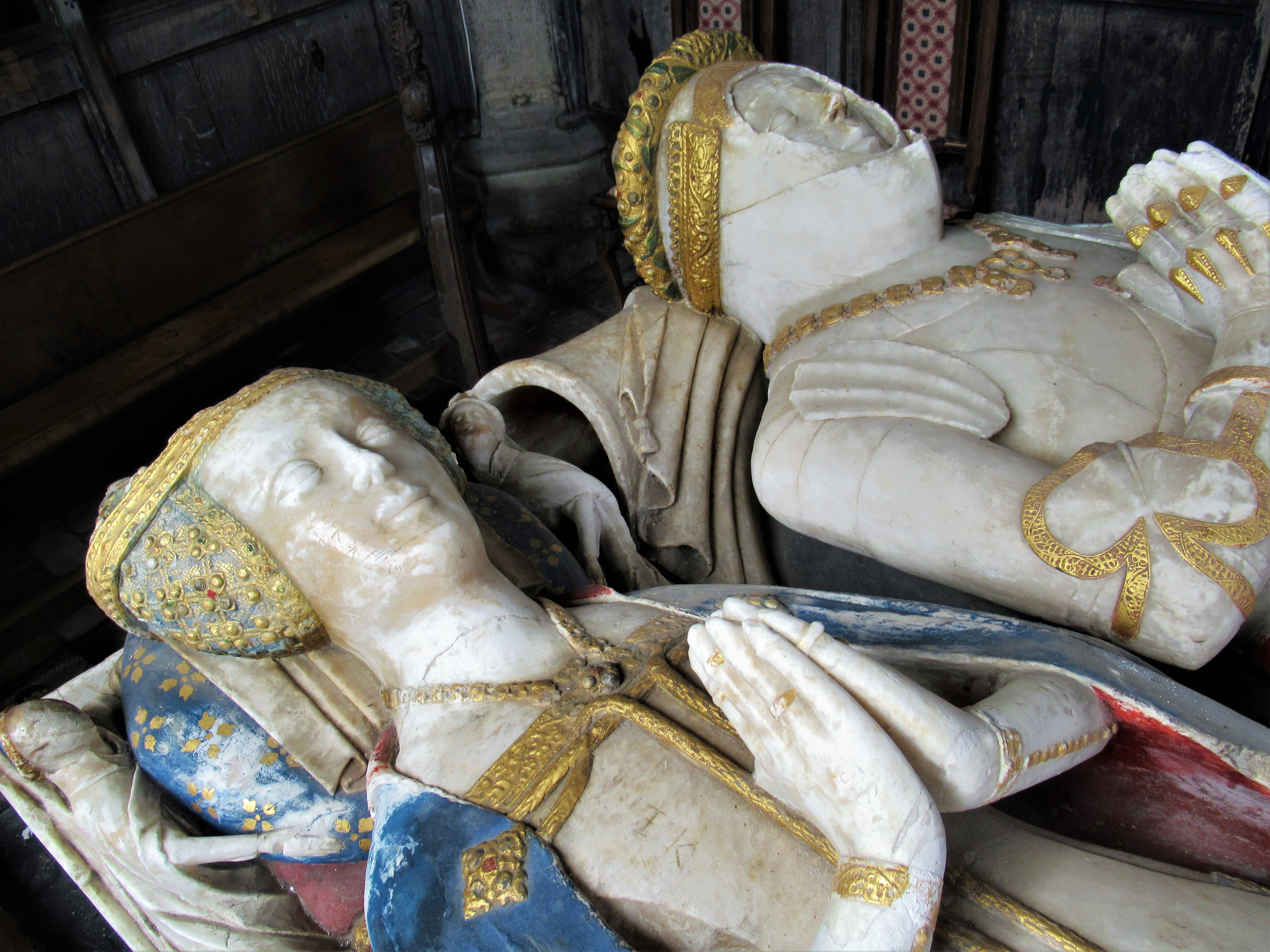
Tomb of Joan Bardolph and William Phelip

He died on 6 June 1441 and was buried in the South Chapel of St Mary's Church, Dennington, Suffolk, where survives his monument with recumbent effigies of himself and his wife. The Norfolk Visitations mention the will, dated 1 September 1438, of William Phelipp, Lord Bardolf, in which John Heydon, esquire, was appointed one of the executors.
