= Wormegay =

Civil parish in Norfolk, England

Coordinates: 52.67754°N 0.45545°E

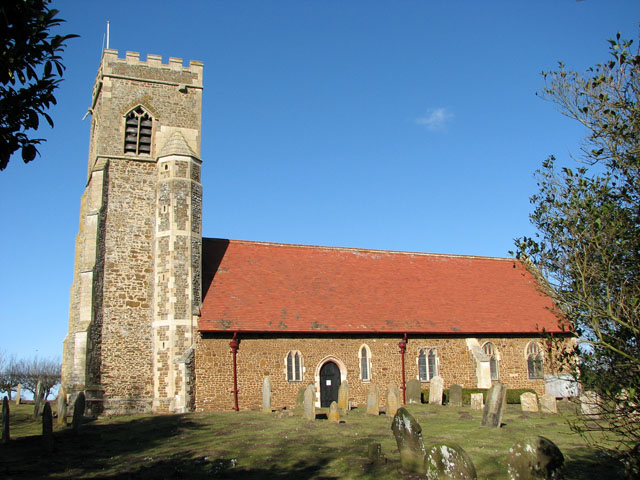
- Church of St Michael and All Angels and Holy Cross

- Location within Norfolk
- Area: 12.18 km^{2} (4.70 sq mi)
- Population: 359 (2011)
  - Density: 29/km^{2} (75/sq mi)
- OS grid reference: TF661117
- Civil parish: Wormegay
- District: King's Lynn and West Norfolk
- Shire county: Norfolk
- Region: East
- Country: England
- Sovereign state: United Kingdom
- Post town: KING'S LYNN
- Postcode district: PE33
- Police: Norfolk
- Fire: Norfolk
- Ambulance: East of England

Wormegay is a civil parish in the English county of Norfolk. The village is situated some 9 kilometres (5.6 miles) south of King's Lynn and 60 km (37 mi) west of Norwich.

It covers an area of 12.18 km^{2} (4.7 sq mi) and had a population of 339 in 141 households at the 2001 census, the population increasing to 359 at the 2011 census.

For the purposes of local government, it falls within the district of King's Lynn and West Norfolk. Norfolk County Council is responsible for roads, some schools, and social services. For Westminster elections the parish forms part of the North West Norfolk constituency.

The place-name 'Wormegay' is first attested in the Domesday Book of 1086, and means 'the island of Wyrm's people'.

The parish church is a Grade II* listed building. Just to the west of the village centre lies Wormegay Castle, a motte-and-bailey earthwork.
