= List of places in Suffolk =

This is a list of cities, towns and villages in the ceremonial county of Suffolk, England.

== A ==
- Acton, Akenham, Aldeburgh, Alderton, Aldham, Aldringham, Alpheton, Ampton, Ashbocking, Ashby, Ashfield, Aspall, Assington, Athelington, Audley End

== B ==
- Babergh, Bacton, Badingham, Badley, Badwell Ash, Ballingdon, Bardwell, Barham, Barking, Barnardiston, Barnby, Barnham, Barningham, Barrow, Barsham, Barton Mills, Battisford, Bawdsey, Baylham, Beccles, Beck Row, Bedfield, Bedingfield, Belstead, Benacre, Benhall, Bentley, Beyton, Bildeston, Blaxhall, Bloodsman's Corner, Blundeston, Blyford, Blythburgh, Botesdale, Boulge, Boxford, Boxted, Boyton, Bradfield Combust, Bradfield St. Clare, Bradfield St George, Braiseworth, Bramfield, Bramford, Brampton, Brandon, Brandeston, Brantham, Bredfield, Brent Eleigh, Bressingham, Brettenham, Bridge Street, Brightwell, Brockford, Brockley, Brome, Brome Street, Bromeswell, Bruisyard, Brundish, Bucklesham, Bulcamp, Bungay, Bures St. Mary, Burgate, Burgh, Burstall, Bury St Edmunds, Butley, Buxhall

== C ==
- Campsea Ashe, Capel St Andrew, Capel St. Mary, Carlton, Carlton Colville, Cattawade, Cavendish, Cavenham, Chantry, Charsfield, Chattisham, Chedburgh, Chediston, Chelmondiston, Chelsworth, Chevington, Chickering, Chillesford, Chilton, Clare, Claydon, Clopton, Cockfield, Coddenham, Combs, Coney Weston, Conyer's Green, Cookley, Cooks Green, Copdock, Cornard Tye, Corton, Cotton, Covehithe, Cowlinge, Crackthorn Corner, Cransford, Cratfield, Creeting All Saints, Creeting St Mary, Creeting St Peter, Cretingham, Cross Street, Crowfield, Culford, Culpho

== D ==
- Dagworth, Dalham, Dallinghoo, Darsham, Darmsden, Debach, Debenham, Denham, Mid Suffolk, Denham, St Edmundsbury, Dennington, Denston, Depden, Dorking Tye, Downham Highlodge, Drinkstone, Dunwich

== E ==
- Earl Soham, Earl Stonham, East Bergholt, Eastbridge, Easton, Easton Bavents, Edwardstone, Ellough, Elmsett, Elmswell, Elveden, Eriswell, Erwarton, Euston, Exning, Eye, Eyke

== F ==
- Falkenham, Fakenham Magna, Farnham, Felixstowe, Felixstowe Ferry, Felsham, Finningham, Flatford, Flempton, Flixton, Lothingland, Flixton, The Saints, Flowton, Fornham All Saints, Fornham St Genevieve, Fornham St Martin, Forward Green, Foxhall, Framlingham, Framsden, Freckenham, Fressingfield, Freston, Friston, Frostenden

== G ==
- Gazeley, Gedding, Gedgrave, Gipping, Gisleham, Gislingham, Glemsford, Gosbeck, Gosling Green, Great Ashfield Great Barton, Great Bealings, Great Blakenham, Great Bradley, Great Bricett, Great Cornard, Great Finborough, Great Glemham, Great Livermere, Great Saxham, Great Thurlow, Great Waldingfield, Great Welnetham, Great Wratting, Gromford, Groton, Grundisburgh, Gunton

== H ==
- Hacheston, Hadleigh, Halesworth, Hardwick, Hargrave, Harkstead, Hartest, Hasketon, Haughley, Haverhill, Hawkedon, Hawstead, Hazelwood, Heckfield Green, Helmingham, Hemingstone, Hemley, Hengrave, Henham, Henley, Henstead, Hepworth, Herringfleet, Herringswell, Hessett, Heveningham, Higham, Babergh, Higham, Forest Heath, Hintlesham, Hinton, Hitcham, Hinderclay, Holbrook, Hollesley, Holton St. Mary, Holton St. Peter, Holywell Row, Homersfield, Honington, Hoo, Hopton, Horham, Horner's Green, Horringer, Hoxne, Hundon, Hunston, Huntingfield

== I ==
- Icklingham, Ickworth, Iken, Ilketshall St Andrew, Ilketshall St John, Ilketshall St Lawrence, Ilketshall St Margaret, Ingate Place, Ingham, Ipswich, Ixworth, Ixworth Thorpe

== K ==
- Kedington, Kelsale, Kenton, Kentford, Kenny Hill, Kersey, Kesgrave, Kessingland, Kettlebaston, Kettleburgh, Kirkley, Kirton, Knettishall, Knodishall

== L ==
- Lackford, Lakenheath, Langham, Lavenham, Lawshall, Laxfield, Layham, Leiston, Leavenheath, Letheringham, Levington, Lidgate, Lindsey, Lindsey Tye, Linstead Magna, Linstead Parva, Little Bealings, Little Blakenham, Little Bradley, Little Bricett, Little Cornard, Little Fakenham, Little Glemham, Little Livermere, Little London, Little Saxham, Little Thurlow, Little Waldingfield, Little Wenham, Little Whelnetham, Little Wratting, Long Melford, Lound, Lowestoft

== M ==
- Market Weston, Marlesford, Martlesham, Martlesham Heath, Melton, Mellis, Mendham, Mendlesham, Metfield, Mettingham, Mickfield, Middleton, Milden, Mildenhall, Minsmere, Monewden, Monk Soham, Monks Eleigh, Moulton, Mutford

== N ==
- Nacton, Naughton, Nayland, Nedging, Needham Market, Nettlestead, Newbourne, Newmarket, Newton, North Cove, Norton, Nowton

== O ==
- Oakley, Occold, Offton, Old Newton, Onehouse, Orford, Otley, Oulton, Oulton Broad, Ousden

== P ==
- Pakefield, Pakenham, Palgrave, Parham, Parliament Heath, Peasenhall, Pettaugh, Pettistree, Pinewood, Pin Mill, Playford, Polstead, Poslingford, Preston St Mary

== R ==
- Ramsholt, Rattlesden, Raydon, Rede, Redgrave, Redisham, Redlingfield, Red Lodge, Rendham, Rendlesham, Reydon, Rickinghall, Ringsfield, Ringshall, Risby, Rishangles, Rodbridge Corner, Rougham, Rumburgh, Round Maple, Rushbrooke, Rushmere, Rushmere St Andrew

== S ==
- Sandcroft, Santon Downham, Sapiston, Saxmundham, Saxtead, Saxtead Green, Semer, Shadingfield, Shelland, Shelley, Shimpling, Shimpling Street, Shingle Street, Shipmeadow, Shotley, Shottisham, Sibton, Sicklesmere, Sizewell, Snape, Somerleyton, Somersham, Somerton, Sotherton, Sotterley, South Cove, South Elmham, Southolt, Southwold, Spexhall, Sproughton, Stanningfield, Stansfield, Stanstead, Stanton, Sternfield, Stoke Ash, Stoke-by-Clare, Stoke-by-Nayland, Stoke Park, Stonham Aspal, Stonham Parva, Stoven, Stowlangtoft, Stowmarket, Stowupland, Stradbroke, Stradishall, Stratford St Andrew, Stratford St Mary, Stratton Hall, Stuston, Stutton, Sudbourne, Sudbury, Sutton, Sweffling, Swilland, Syleham

== T ==
- Tannington, Tattingstone, Theberton, Thelnetham, Thorington, Thorndon, Thornham Magna, Thornham Parva, Thorns, Thorpe Morieux, Thorpeness, Thrandeston, Thurston, Thwaite, Timworth, Tostock, Trimley St Martin, Trimley St Mary, Troston, Tuddenham, Tuddenham St Martin, Tunstall

== U ==
- Ubbeston, Ufford, Uggeshall, Upthorpe

== W ==
- Walberswick, Waldringfield, Waldringfield Heath, Walpole, Walsham le Willows, Walton, Wangford, Forest Heath, Wangford (near Southwold), Wantisden, Washbrook, Wattisfield, Wattisham, Wenham Magna, Wenhaston, West Row, West Stow, Westerfield, Westleton, Westhall, Westhorpe, Westley, Weston, Wetherden, Wetheringsett, Weybread, Whatfield, Whepstead, Wherstead, Whitton, Wickhambrook, Wickham Green, Wickham Market, Wickham Skeith, Wickham Street, Wilby, Willingham St Mary, Willisham, Wingfield, Winston, Wissett, Wissington, Withersdale Street, Withersfield, Witnesham, Wixoe, Woodbridge, Woolpit, Woolverstone, Worlington, Worlingham, Worlingworth, Wortham, Wrentham

== Y ==
- Yaxley, Yoxford

== Places of interest ==
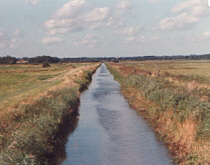
Suffolk Landscape

- Bridge Cottage, Flatford Mill
- Bures
- Clare Castle
- Dedham Vale
- East Anglia Transport Museum
- Easton Farm Park
- Framlingham Castle
- Ickworth House
- Leiston Abbey
- Mid-Suffolk Light Railway
- Museum of East Anglian Life
- Norfolk and Suffolk Aviation Museum
- Ness point located in Lowestoft, the UK's most easterly point.
- Orford Ness
- RSPB Minsmere
- RSPB Stour Estuary
- Saxtead Green Post Mill
- Snape Maltings
- Suffolk Coast Path
- Sutton Hoo

== See also ==
- List of civil parishes in Suffolk
- List of places of interest in Suffolk
- List of settlements in Suffolk by population
- List of places in England
