= Grade II* listed buildings in St Edmundsbury (borough) =

There are over 20,000 Grade II* listed buildings in England. This page is a list of these buildings in the district of St Edmundsbury in Suffolk.

== St. Edmundsbury ==
| Name | Location | Type | Completed (Note: The date given is the date used by Historic England as significant for the initial building or that of an important part in the structure's description.) | Date designated | Grid ref. (Note: The grid reference is based on the British national grid reference system, sometimes known as OSGB36, used by the Ordnance Survey.) Geo-coordinates | Entry number (Note: The "List Entry Number" is a unique number assigned to each listed building and scheduled monument by Historic England.) | Image |
|---|---|---|---|---|---|---|---|
| Bardwell Hall | Bardwell, St. Edmundsbury | House | 16th century | 14 July 1955 | TL9400272615; 52°19′02″N 0°50′42″E | 1031309 | Bardwell Hall More images |
| Bardwell Windmill | Bardwell | Tower Mill | c. 1830 | 14 December 1983 | TL9410773806; 52°19′41″N 0°50′50″E | 1181859 | Bardwell Windmill More images |
| Church of All Saints | Barnardiston | Church | Pre 13th century | 19 December 1961 | TL7118448702; 52°06′37″N 0°29′54″E | 1031773 | Church of All Saints More images |
| Building 58, Former RAF Barnham Atomic Bomb Store | Barnham | Bomb Store | Built 1953-1954 | 24 June 2011 | TL8515579855; 52°23′07″N 0°43′09″E | 1402411 | Building 58, Former RAF Barnham Atomic Bomb Store |
| Building 60, Former RAF Barnham Atomic Bomb Store | Barnham | Bomb Store | 1953-1954 | 24 June 2011 | TL8521979964; 52°23′11″N 0°43′13″E | 1402497 | Upload Photo |
| Building 61, Former RAF Barnham Atomic Bomb Store | Barnham | Bomb Store | 1953-1954 | 24 June 2011 | TL8525079857; 52°23′07″N 0°43′14″E | 1402479 | Upload Photo |
| All Saints Church | Bradfield Combust with Stanningfield | Church | c. 1300 | 14 July 1955 | TL8922357309; 52°10′54″N 0°45′59″E | 1228768 | All Saints Church More images |
| Former Roman Catholic Chapel, 5 Metres East of Coldham Hall | Bradfield Combust with Stanningfield | Roman Catholic Chapel | c. 1800 | 14 July 1955 | TL8640455855; 52°10′10″N 0°43′28″E | 1229769 | Upload Photo |
| Church of St Clare | Bradfield St. Clare | Church | Late 15th century | 14 July 1955 | TL9095557800; 52°11′07″N 0°47′31″E | 1279340 | Church of St Clare More images |
| St Andrew's Church | Brockley | Church | Early 14th century | 14 July 1955 | TL8273655553; 52°10′05″N 0°40′14″E | 1279218 | St Andrew's Church More images |
| Abbey House | 30, Angel Hill, Bury St. Edmunds | House | Late 18th century | 7 August 1952 | TL8556264166; 52°14′40″N 0°43′00″E | 1141178 | Abbey House More images |
| Ancient House & Oak House | 33a & 33b, Eastgate St, Bury St. Edmunds | House | 18th century | 7 August 1952 | TL8598664569; 52°14′52″N 0°43′23″E | 1343595 | Upload Photo |
| Angel Hotel | 3, Angel Hill, Bury St. Edmunds | Inn | Before 1774 | 7 August 1952 | TL8549064186; 52°14′41″N 0°42′56″E | 1141153 | Angel Hotel More images |
| Baret House | 3, Chequer Sq, Bury St. Edmunds | House | 14th century | 7 August 1952 | TL8553664032; 52°14′35″N 0°42′58″E | 1248046 | Baret House More images |
| Church of St Edmund | Bury St. Edmunds | Roman Catholic Church | 1837 | 7 August 1952 | TL8534063744; 52°14′26″N 0°42′47″E | 1142338 | Church of St Edmund More images |
| Church of St John | Bury St. Edmunds | Parish Church | 1841 | 7 August 1952 | TL8528164677; 52°14′57″N 0°42′46″E | 1135148 | Church of St John More images |
| Dog and Partridge Inn | 29, Crown St, Bury St. Edmunds | Jettied House | Early 17th century | 7 August 1952 | TL8559363861; 52°14′30″N 0°43′01″E | 1342750 | Dog and Partridge Inn More images |
| Gateway and Walling to Number 13 the Fort Fronting the Road | Sicklesmere Rd, Bury St. Edmunds | Prison | 1803 | 7 August 1952 | TL8624363148; 52°14′06″N 0°43′34″E | 1135179 | Gateway and Walling to Number 13 the Fort Fronting the Road |
| Manchester House | 113, Northgate St, Bury St. Edmunds | House | Early 17th century | 7 August 1952 | TL8557664492; 52°14′50″N 0°43′01″E | 1365774 | Manchester House More images |
| Manson House | 111, Northgate St, Bury St. Edmunds | Timber Framed House | 16th century | 7 August 1952 | TL8554864583; 52°14′53″N 0°43′00″E | 1365772 | Manson House More images |
| Moreton Hall School | Bury St. Edmunds | School | 1773 | 12 July 1972 | TL8693564497; 52°14′49″N 0°44′13″E | 1022597 | Moreton Hall School More images |
| Number 8, St Mary's Square and attached Wall | Bury St. Edmunds | Timber Framed House | Mid 17th century | 7 August 1952 | TL8579263786; 52°14′27″N 0°43′11″E | 1135172 | Number 8, St Mary's Square and attached Wall More images |
| Ridleys | 35 & 36, Abbeygate St, Bury St. Edmunds | House | c. 1700 | 7 August 1952 | TL8546264204; 52°14′41″N 0°42′54″E | 1328871 | Ridleys More images |
| St Andrews Castle | St Andrew's St South, Bury St. Edmunds | House | Late C18/Early 19th century | 12 July 1972 | TL8513563966; 52°14′34″N 0°42′37″E | 1245008 | Upload Photo |
| St Denys | 6, Honey Hill, Bury St. Edmunds | Timber Framed House | 15th century | 7 August 1952 | TL8570063928; 52°14′32″N 0°43′06″E | 1022548 | Upload Photo |
| St Margarets House | Abbey Precinct, Bury St. Edmunds | House | Early 18th century | 7 August 1952 | TL8580163977; 52°14′33″N 0°43′12″E | 1375562 | St Margarets House More images |
| St Michaels Close, Flats 1-11 (consecutive) | Bury St. Edmunds | Apartment | c. 1945 | 7 August 1952 | TL8549264657; 52°14′56″N 0°42′57″E | 1022633 | Upload Photo |
| St Nicholas | 2, Hollow Rd, Bury St. Edmunds | Timber Framed House | 17th century | 7 August 1952 | TL8636564820; 52°15′00″N 0°43′43″E | 1022540 | St Nicholas More images |
| The Fox Inn | Bury St. Edmunds | Jettied House | 15th century | 7 August 1952 | TL8578264402; 52°14′47″N 0°43′12″E | 1075223 | The Fox Inn More images |
| The Priory Hotel | Bury St. Edmunds | Timber Framed House | Fragmentary older core | 7 August 1952 | TL8505665991; 52°15′39″N 0°42′37″E | 1022595 | Upload Photo |
| Walls to the Priory Hotel | Bury St. Edmunds | Wall | 18th century | 7 August 1952 | TL8508865952; 52°15′38″N 0°42′38″E | 1022596 | Upload Photo |
| The Rising Sun Public House | Bury St. Edmunds | Cross Wing House | 15th century | 7 August 1952 | TL8506864487; 52°14′51″N 0°42′34″E | 1244921 | The Rising Sun Public House More images |
| Turret House | 24, Westgate St, Bury St. Edmunds | House | Late 17th century | 7 August 1952 | TL8529763760; 52°14′27″N 0°42′45″E | 1142315 | Turret House More images |
| Weavers Rest | 80, Southgate St, Bury St. Edmunds | Jettied House | Late 15th century | 7 August 1952 | TL8609463342; 52°14′13″N 0°43′26″E | 1272141 | Weavers Rest More images |
| 11 Abbeygate Street | Bury St. Edmunds | House | 18th century | 7 August 1952 | TL8536164212; 52°14′42″N 0°42′49″E | 1021955 | 11 Abbeygate Street More images |
| 28 and 28a, Abbeygate Street | Bury St. Edmunds | House | Early 17th century | 12 July 1972 | TL8547164233; 52°14′42″N 0°42′55″E | 1328867 | 28 and 28a, Abbeygate Street |
| 31 and 32 Abbeygate Street | Bury St. Edmunds | Timber Framed House | 18th century | 7 August 1952 | TL8549064216; 52°14′41″N 0°42′56″E | 1328869 | 31 and 32 Abbeygate Street More images |
| 49, Abbeygate Street | Bury St. Edmunds | Apartment | Mid 19th century | 12 July 1972 | TL8536564171; 52°14′40″N 0°42′49″E | 1141138 | 49, Abbeygate Street More images |
| 56, Abbeygate Street | Bury St. Edmunds | Jettied House | Late 15th century | 7 August 1952 | TL8531664173; 52°14′40″N 0°42′47″E | 1141143 | 56, Abbeygate Street More images |
| 58, Abbeygate Street | Bury St. Edmunds | House | C20 | 7 August 1952 | TL8529264173; 52°14′40″N 0°42′45″E | 1141145 | 58, Abbeygate Street More images |
| 7 Northgate Street | Bury St. Edmunds | Jettied House | c. 1500 | 7 August 1952 | TL8556864410; 52°14′48″N 0°43′00″E | 1022611 | 7 Northgate Street More images |
| 112, Northgate Street | Bury St. Edmunds | House | Early/Mid 18th century | 7 August 1952 | TL8557164516; 52°14′51″N 0°43′01″E | 1365773 | 112, Northgate Street More images |
| 5 & 6, St Marys Square | Bury St. Edmunds | Timber Framed House | Early 16th century | 7 August 1952 | TL8579163824; 52°14′28″N 0°43′11″E | 1135169 | Upload Photo |
| 6, Angel Hill | Bury St. Edmunds | House | Edwardian | 7 August 1952 | TL8549064241; 52°14′42″N 0°42′56″E | 1141156 | 6, Angel Hill More images |
| 31, 32 and 33, Angel Hill | Bury St. Edmunds | Apartment | 1972 | 12 July 1972 | TL8555664141; 52°14′39″N 0°42′59″E | 1141179 | 31, 32 and 33, Angel Hill More images |
| 79, Guildhall Street | Bury St. Edmunds | Apartment | 1952 | 7 August 1952 | TL8524864026; 52°14′36″N 0°42′43″E | 1363716 | 79, Guildhall Street More images |
| 80, Guildhall Street | Bury St. Edmunds | House | Early 18th century | 7 August 1952 | TL8524564046; 52°14′36″N 0°42′43″E | 1363717 | 80, Guildhall Street More images |
| 38 Churchgate Street | Bury St. Edmunds | House | Earlier core | 7 August 1952 | TL8552364062; 52°14′36″N 0°42′57″E | 1248210 | 38 Churchgate Street More images |
| 48, 49 and 49a Churchgate Street | Bury St. Edmunds | House | Late C18/Early 19th century | 12 July 1972 | TL8543064041; 52°14′36″N 0°42′52″E | 1248214 | 48, 49 and 49a Churchgate Street |
| 45 and 45a, Crown Street | Bury St. Edmunds | House | Early/Mid 18th century | 7 August 1952 | TL8556163986; 52°14′34″N 0°42′59″E | 1342760 | 45 and 45a, Crown Street More images |
| 93 and 95, Risbygate Street | Bury St. Edmunds | Jettied House | 14th century | 7 August 1952 | TL8501564490; 52°14′51″N 0°42′31″E | 1244918 | 93 and 95, Risbygate Street More images |
| Church Cottages | Cavendish | House | 1966 | 10 February 1955 | TL8050646504; 52°05′15″N 0°38′00″E | 1286156 | Church Cottages More images |
| Church of All Saints | Chedburgh | Church | Medieval | 14 July 1955 | TL7961957481; 52°11′11″N 0°37′34″E | 1186958 | Church of All Saints More images |
| Moat Farmhouse | Chevington | House | c. 1580 | 25 August 1983 | TL8090558878; 52°11′54″N 0°38′44″E | 1186965 | Upload Photo |
| Chapel Cottage | Clare | House | C20 | 19 December 1961 | TL7678146497; 52°05′19″N 0°34′44″E | 1031736 | Chapel Cottage More images |
| Church Farmhouse | Clare | Timber Framed House | | 19 December 1961 | TL7690745493; 52°04′46″N 0°34′49″E | 1285562 | Church Farmhouse More images |
| Clare Castle | Clare | Castle | Mediaeval | 19 December 1961 | TL7706145212; 52°04′37″N 0°34′56″E | 1031764 | Clare Castle More images |
| Netheridge | Clare | House | 17th century | 19 December 1961 | TL7678945105; 52°04′34″N 0°34′42″E | 1180568 | Netheridge More images |
| Red House | Clare | Timber Framed House | 17th century | 19 December 1961 | TL7680445116; 52°04′34″N 0°34′43″E | 1031722 | Red House More images |
| Riverside | Clare | House | 17th century | 19 December 1961 | TL7664344870; 52°04′26″N 0°34′34″E | 1285380 | Upload Photo |
| Stour House | Clare | House | 17th century | 19 December 1961 | TL7669144903; 52°04′27″N 0°34′36″E | 1031729 | Stour House More images |
| The Old Bear and Crown Hotel | Clare | Jettied House | 16th century | 19 December 1961 | TL7701145309; 52°04′40″N 0°34′54″E | 1285511 | The Old Bear and Crown Hotel More images |
| The Swan Inn | Clare | Inn | 15th century | 19 December 1961 | TL7693945293; 52°04′40″N 0°34′50″E | 1031743 | The Swan Inn More images |
| The Vicarage | Clare | House | 19th century | 19 December 1961 | TL7691245377; 52°04′43″N 0°34′49″E | 1031746 | The Vicarage More images |
| Verandah House | Clare | Timber Framed House | 16th century | 19 December 1961 | TL7674244969; 52°04′30″N 0°34′39″E | 1376689 | Verandah House More images |
| 11–13 High Street | Clare | Timber Framed House | | 19 December 1961 | TL7692745346; 52°04′42″N 0°34′50″E | 1194690 | 11–13 High Street More images |
| Culford Hall | Culford Park, Culford | Country House/School | Late 16th century | 14 July 1955 | TL8318770388; 52°18′04″N 0°41′07″E | 1031236 | Culford Hall More images |
| Home Farm | Culford | Farmhouse | 19th century | 6 August 1997 | TL8361470031; 52°17′52″N 0°41′29″E | 1245125 | Upload Photo |
| Church of St Mary | Denham | Church | Medieval | 14 July 1955 | TL7558561823; 52°13′36″N 0°34′10″E | 1285509 | Church of St Mary More images |
| Denston Hall | Denston | House | Early 16th century | 19 December 1961 | TL7586952450; 52°08′32″N 0°34′07″E | 1031702 | Denston Hall More images |
| Church of St Mary | Depden | Church | 12th century | 19 December 1961 | TL7778156609; 52°10′45″N 0°35′56″E | 1031669 | Church of St Mary More images |
| Euston Hall | Euston Park, Euston | House | 1660s | 14 July 1955 | TL8983478620; 52°22′22″N 0°47′14″E | 1376940 | Euston Hall More images |
| Stables to Euston Hall | Euston Park, Euston | House | Late 17th century | 14 July 1955 | TL8979278678; 52°22′24″N 0°47′12″E | 1031286 | Upload Photo |
| The Temple | Euston Park, Euston | Banqueting House | 1746 | 14 July 1955 | TL9041278412; 52°22′14″N 0°47′44″E | 1376924 | The Temple More images |
| Church of St Catherine | Flempton | Church | Mid 14th century | 14 July 1955 | TL8130869933; 52°17′51″N 0°39′27″E | 1031415 | Church of St Catherine More images |
| Church of St Genevieve at Fornham Park | Fornham St. Genevieve | Church (ruined) | 14th century | 14 July 1955 | TL8399668359; 52°16′57″N 0°41′45″E | 1376908 | Church of St Genevieve at Fornham Park More images |
| Church of St Martin | Fornham St. Martin | Parish Church | 12th century | 14 July 1955 | TL8523366958; 52°16′10″N 0°42′48″E | 1194364 | Church of St Martin More images |
| Barn at Manor Farm | Great Barton | Aisled Barn | 13th century | 28 March 1985 | TL8905566503; 52°15′51″N 0°46′08″E | 1031150 | Upload Photo |
| Conyers Green Farmhouse | Great Barton | Farmhouse | 15th century | 14 July 1955 | TL8862767545; 52°16′25″N 0°45′48″E | 1031155 | Upload Photo |
| Church of St Mary | Great Bradley | Church | 12th century | 19 December 1961 | TL6742553170; 52°09′05″N 0°26′45″E | 1181580 | Church of St Mary More images |
| Church of SS Peter and Paul | Livermere Park, Great Livermere | Church (ruined) | 13th century | 14 July 1955 | TL8817671857; 52°18′45″N 0°45′33″E | 1031249 | Church of SS Peter and Paul More images |
| Church of All Saints | Great Thurlow | Church | Norman | 19 December 1961 | TL6808250333; 52°07′33″N 0°27′14″E | 1031676 | Church of All Saints More images |
| Great Thurlow Hall | Great Thurlow | House | 18th century | 19 December 1961 | TL6812050266; 52°07′30″N 0°27′16″E | 1181879 | Great Thurlow Hall More images |
| Great Thurlow Windmill | Great Thurlow | Smock Mill | C18-C19 | 20 May 1974 | TL6715349975; 52°07′22″N 0°26′25″E | 1376729 | Great Thurlow Windmill More images |
| Church of St Mary | Great Wratting | Church | 13th century | 19 December 1961 | TL6880348189; 52°06′23″N 0°27′48″E | 1031644 | Church of St Mary More images |
| Church of St Edmund | Hargrave | Church | Medieval | 14 July 1955 | TL7667360841; 52°13′03″N 0°35′05″E | 1186976 | Church of St Edmund More images |
| Anne of Cleves House | Haverhill | Jettied House | Early 16th century | 26 June 1952 | TL6756045068; 52°04′43″N 0°26′37″E | 1375508 | Anne of Cleves House More images |
| Church of St Mary | Haverhill | Church | 13th century | 26 June 1952 | TL6715345520; 52°04′58″N 0°26′17″E | 1375520 | Church of St Mary More images |
| Old Independent Church | Haverhill | Congregational Chapel | 1884 | 9 May 1973 | TL6751045161; 52°04′46″N 0°26′35″E | 1375509 | Old Independent Church More images |
| Langleys Newhouse | Hawkedon | Timber Framed House | 16th century | 19 December 1961 | TL8041953834; 52°09′12″N 0°38′09″E | 1182095 | Upload Photo |
| Church of St Peter | Hepworth | Parish Church | 13th century | 14 July 1955 | TL9874874854; 52°20′09″N 0°54′57″E | 1031214 | Church of St Peter More images |
| Church of St Leonard | Horringer | Church | Medieval | 14 July 1955 | TL8258162021; 52°13′34″N 0°40′18″E | 1298948 | Church of St Leonard More images |
| Church of All Saints | Hundon | Church | Early 14th century | 19 December 1961 | TL7386648742; 52°06′35″N 0°32′15″E | 1182185 | Church of All Saints More images |
| Thatchers Hall | Hundon | Jettied House | 15th century | 19 December 1961 | TL7376248844; 52°06′38″N 0°32′10″E | 1182332 | Upload Photo |
| Church of St Mary | Ickworth | Church | Medieval | 14 July 1955 | TL8124861115; 52°13′06″N 0°39′07″E | 1187001 | Church of St Mary More images |
| Church of St Bartholomew | Ingham | Parish Church | Pre 1300 | 14 July 1955 | TL8552570546; 52°18′06″N 0°43′10″E | 1031246 | Church of St Bartholomew More images |
| Dover House and Garden Wall Adjoining on West | Stow Rd, Ixworth | Farmhouse | 15th century | 11 July 1983 | TL9315770252; 52°17′47″N 0°49′52″E | 1031458 | Dover House and Garden Wall Adjoining on West More images |
| Stable to Pickerel Inn | Ixworth | Garage | C20 | 14 July 1955 | TL9325670421; 52°17′52″N 0°49′58″E | 1376845 | Stable to Pickerel Inn More images |
| Water Mill and Mill House | Ixworth | Mill House | Early 17th century | 14 July 1955 | TL9274671094; 52°18′15″N 0°49′32″E | 1376833 | Upload Photo |
| Ketton House | Kedington | House | Early 18th century | 19 December 1961 | TL7082346425; 52°05′23″N 0°29′31″E | 1031633 | Upload Photo |
| Church of St Lawrence | Lackford | Church | Medieval | 14 July 1955 | TL7976470283; 52°18′04″N 0°38′06″E | 1180661 | Church of St Lawrence More images |
| Church of St Mary | Lidgate | Church | 13th century | 19 December 1961 | TL7206058159; 52°11′41″N 0°30′57″E | 1376756 | Church of St Mary More images |
| John-o-Lidgates House | Lidgate | Timber Framed House | 16th century | 19 December 1961 | TL7213957874; 52°11′32″N 0°31′01″E | 1182635 | Upload Photo |
| Almshouses | Little Thurlow | Almshouses | 1618 | 19 December 1961 | TL6764051418; 52°08′08″N 0°26′53″E | 1265476 | Almshouses |
| Church of St Peter | Little Thurlow | Church | Early 14th century | 19 December 1961 | TL6796751188; 52°08′00″N 0°27′10″E | 1227189 | Church of St Peter More images |
| Lavender Cottage | Little Thurlow | Jettied House | 16th century | 19 December 1961 | TL6777150761; 52°07′47″N 0°26′59″E | 1227312 | Upload Photo |
| The Olde School House | Little Thurlow | House | 1961 | 19 December 1961 | TL6777650914; 52°07′52″N 0°26′59″E | 1227210 | The Olde School House More images |
| Church of St Mary | Little Wratting | Church | 11th century | 19 December 1961 | TL6904347647; 52°06′05″N 0°28′00″E | 1227380 | Church of St Mary More images |
| Church of St Mary | Market Weston | Parish Church | 14th century | 14 July 1955 | TL9903878105; 52°21′53″N 0°55′19″E | 1283638 | Church of St Mary More images |
| Church of St Peter | Nowton | Parish Church | 12th century | 14 July 1955 | TL8633060467; 52°12′39″N 0°43′33″E | 1194745 | Church of St Peter More images |
| Nowton Hall | Nowton | Farmhouse | Early 16th century | 14 July 1955 | TL8610160464; 52°12′39″N 0°43′21″E | 1031160 | Nowton Hall More images |
| Barton Mere House | Barton Mere, Pakenham | House | Early 17th century | 14 July 1955 | TL9109366950; 52°16′03″N 0°47′57″E | 1031462 | Upload Photo |
| Newe House | Pakenham | House | Earlier | 14 July 1955 | TL9310967257; 52°16′10″N 0°49′43″E | 1181365 | Newe House More images |
| Pakenham Windmill | Pakenham | Tower Mill | c. 1820 | 14 July 1955 | TL9309369414; 52°17′20″N 0°49′47″E | 1376861 | Pakenham Windmill More images |
| Watermill | Pakenham | Water Mill | 1814 | 11 July 1983 | TL9371869439; 52°17′20″N 0°50′20″E | 1285022 | Watermill More images |
| Watermill Farmhouse | Pakenham | Farmhouse | Early 17th century | 11 July 1983 | TL9367169482; 52°17′22″N 0°50′18″E | 1376839 | Watermill Farmhouse More images |
| Church of St Mary | Poslingford | | 12th century | 19 December 1961 | TL7696448182; 52°06′13″N 0°34′57″E | 1265343 | Church of St Mary More images |
| Church of All Saints | Rede | Church | Earlier than 12th century | 14 July 1955 | TL8047855932; 52°10′20″N 0°38′16″E | 1187006 | Church of All Saints More images |
| Layers Breck Farmhouse | Blackthorpe, Rushbrooke with Rougham | Farmhouse | 15th century | 21 February 1972 | TL9011563184; 52°14′02″N 0°46′57″E | 1031165 | Upload Photo |
| The Rookery | Rushbrooke with Rougham | House | 19th century | 28 March 1985 | TL9013463490; 52°14′12″N 0°46′59″E | 1376992 | Upload Photo |
| Church of All Saints | Stanton | Parish Church | 14th century | 14 July 1955 | TL9658873443; 52°19′26″N 0°53′00″E | 1376971 | Church of All Saints More images |
| Church of St John | Stanton | Church (redundant) | 13th century | 14 July 1955 | TL9621373753; 52°19′36″N 0°52′41″E | 1031224 | Church of St John More images |
| Grundle House | Stanton | House | 18th century | 14 July 1955 | TL9675673104; 52°19′15″N 0°53′08″E | 1285805 | Upload Photo |
| Upthorpe Windmill | Stanton | Post Mill | 1807 | 10 June 1970 | TL9713373299; 52°19′21″N 0°53′28″E | 1376972 | Upthorpe Windmill More images |
| Wyken Hall | Stanton | Timber Framed House | Late 16th century | 14 December 1983 | TL9656271606; 52°18′27″N 0°52′55″E | 1031323 | Wyken Hall |
| Cellarers Cottage | Stoke-by-Clare | Cross Wing House | C15-C16 | 19 December 1961 | TL7408243388; 52°03′41″N 0°32′17″E | 1235566 | Cellarers Cottage More images |
| Dovecote | Stanton | Dovecote | 15th century | 19 December 1961 | TL7405543376; 52°03′41″N 0°32′15″E | 1235337 | Upload Photo |
| Green Farm Cottage | Stoke-by-Clare | Jettied House | 16th century | 19 December 1961 | TL7414743572; 52°03′47″N 0°32′20″E | 1235447 | Green Farm Cottage More images |
| Green Farmhouse | Stoke-by-Clare | House | pre 18th century | 19 December 1961 | TL7415043601; 52°03′48″N 0°32′21″E | 1265089 | Green Farmhouse More images |
| Stoke College | Stoke-by-Clare | Country House | 1534 | 19 December 1961 | TL7413643168; 52°03′34″N 0°32′19″E | 1265211 | Stoke College More images |
| Church of St Andrew | Great Saxham, The Saxhams | Church | Medieval | 14 July 1955 | TL7884962812; 52°14′04″N 0°37′04″E | 1031401 | Church of St Andrew More images |
| Great Saxham Hall | Great Saxham, The Saxhams | Country House | Finished 1798 | 14 July 1955 | TL7907062725; 52°14′01″N 0°37′15″E | 1181101 | Upload Photo |
| The Garden House, Great Saxham Hall | Great Saxham, The Saxhams | Garden House | Late 18th century | 14 July 1955 | TL7960462281; 52°13′46″N 0°37′42″E | 1031410 | The Garden House, Great Saxham Hall More images |
| Thelnetham Windmill | Thelnetham | Tower Mill | c. 1600 | 27 September 1984 | TM0110078967; 52°22′19″N 0°57′10″E | 1031207 | Thelnetham Windmill More images |
| Church of St Andrew | Timworth | Parish Church | 13th century | 14 July 1955 | TL8605869733; 52°17′39″N 0°43′37″E | 1194770 | Church of St Andrew More images |
| Troston Hall | Troston | House | Early 17th century | 14 July 1955 | TL9017271808; 52°18′41″N 0°47′18″E | 1031251 | Upload Photo |
| Church of St Mary | West Stow | Parish Church | 11th century | 14 July 1955 | TL8193370554; 52°18′11″N 0°40′01″E | 1180464 | Church of St Mary More images |
| Church of St Mary | Westley | Church | 1835 | 14 July 1955 | TL8237764518; 52°14′55″N 0°40′13″E | 1205397 | Church of St Mary More images |
| Church of St Petronilla | Whepstead | Church | Late 11th century or Early 12th century | 14 July 1955 | TL8327858238; 52°11′31″N 0°40′48″E | 1230460 | Church of St Petronilla More images |
| Badmondisfield Hall | Wickhambrook | House | 18th century | 19 December 1961 | TL7473257021; 52°11′02″N 0°33′16″E | 1235891 | Badmondisfield Hall More images |
| Clopton Hall | Wickhambrook | Jettied House | 16th century | 19 December 1961 | TL7668554737; 52°09′45″N 0°34′54″E | 1264858 | Upload Photo |
| Barn to Hall Farmhouse | Withersfield | Moat | 16th century | 19 December 1961 | TL6556447611; 52°06′07″N 0°24′57″E | 1236069 | Upload Photo |
| Church of St Mary | Withersfield | Church | Late 13th century or early 14th century | 19 December 1961 | TL6512447764; 52°06′13″N 0°24′34″E | 1235962 | Church of St Mary More images |
| The Rectory | Withersfield | Vicarage | c. 1720 | 19 December 1961 | TL6522247755; 52°06′12″N 0°24′39″E | 1236035 | Upload Photo |
| Church of St Leonard | Wixoe | Church | 12th century | 19 December 1961 | TL7180642994; 52°03′31″N 0°30′17″E | 1236079 | Church of St Leonard More images |
