= List of places of interest in Suffolk =

Districts of Suffolk
1 Ipswich
2 East Suffolk
3 Mid Suffolk
4 Babergh
5 West Suffolk

This is a list of places of interest in the British county of Suffolk. See List of places in Suffolk for a list of settlements in Suffolk.

== Babergh ==
Name	Image	Location	Description
Bridge Cottage		East Bergholt	16th-century thatched cottage in the heart of Dedham Vale, notable as the location for works by John Constable. It contains an exhibition of said works. Grade II* listed building.
Chapel of St Stephen		Bures St. Mary	13th-century chapel built on the site traditionally believed to be the location of the coronation of St. Edmund as King of the East Angles on Christmas Day 855. Grade I listed building.
Dedham Vale		Bures St. Mary	Area of Outstanding Natural Beauty comprising the area around the River Stour best known since the artist's lifetime as Constable Country, as it was made famous by the paintings of John Constable.
Flatford Mill		Flatford	Watermill built in 1733. The mill was owned by John Constable's father and it is notable for its appearances in his works, particularly The Hay Wain (1821). Grade I listed building.
Gainsborough's House		Sudbury	Birthplace of the leading painter Thomas Gainsborough. It is now a museum and gallery.
Historic Centre of Lavenham		Lavenham	Village with half-timbered medieval cottages and a circular walk.
Kentwell Hall		Long Melford	16th-century country house that has been the background location for numerous film and television productions. Its grounds include gardens and a rare breeds farm. Grade I listed building.
Lavenham Guildhall		Lavenham	16th-century timber-framed building built as the headquarters of the wool guild, which became Lavenham's principal meeting place and centre of business, situated on the town's thriving market place as a result of the town's central position in the East Anglian wool trade. Grade I listed building.
Melford Hall		Long Melford	16th-century country house that is the ancestral seat of the Parker baronets. Grade I listed building.
St Peter and St Paul's Church, Lavenham		Lavenham	Anglican church built in 1525 that is a notable wool church and regarded as the finest example of late Perpendicular Gothic architecture in England. Grade I listed building.

== Ipswich ==
Name	Image	Location	Description
Ancient House, Ipswich		Ipswich	15th-century building notable as a particularly fine example of pargeting. Grade I listed building.
Christchurch Mansion and Park		Ipswich	Tudor mansion built in 1548–50 and situated in parkland. It houses a collection of pottery and glass, a contemporary art gallery and a collection of paintings by artists including John Constable and Thomas Gainsborough. Grade I listed building.
Endeavour House		Ipswich	Headquarters of Suffolk County Council and one of the most energy efficient office buildings in Europe.
Historic Centre of Ipswich		Ipswich	One of England's oldest towns, having been founded under the Roman Empire, and it contains various historic buildings. It is also the cultural and political centre of Suffolk, and by far its largest urban area.
Ipswich Dock		Ipswich	Historic dock which has been used for trade since at least the 8th Century. A wet dock was constructed in 1842 which was the largest enclosed dock in the United Kingdom at the time.
Ipswich Museum		Ipswich	Museum of culture, history and natural heritage.
Ipswich Town Hall		Ipswich	Victorian town hall built in 1878, now used as an art gallery.
Ipswich Transport Museum		Ipswich	Museum devoted principally to the history of transport and engineering objects made or used in its local area. Its collection of over 100 large objects includes Trams, Buses, cranes and Wheelchairs.
Portman Road		Ipswich	Association football stadium that has been the home ground of Ipswich Town F.C. since 1884.
Sir Bobby Robson Bridge		Ipswich	Pedestrian footbridge over the River Gipping, named after Bobby Robson, ex-manager of Ipswich Town F.C. It is the second highest structure in Ipswich.
Willis Building		Ipswich	One of the earliest buildings designed by Norman Foster after establishing Foster Associates. Grade I listed building.

== Mid Suffolk ==
Name	Image	Location	Description
Buxhall Tower Mill		Buxhall	Tower mill built in 1860 which has been converted to residential accommodation.
Church of St Mary, Horham		Horham	Medieval Anglican church containing the oldest ring of eight bells in the world. Grade II* listed building.
Church of St Peter and St Paul, Fressingfield		Fressingfield	15th-century Anglican church with a sanctus tower believed to be the finest in Suffolk. Grade I listed building.
Church of St Mary, Thornham Parva		Thornham Parva	Anglo-Saxon thatched church featuring early 14th-century wall paintings, a circular Saxon window and a famous retable. Grade I listed building.
Crowfield Windmill		Crowfield, Suffolk	Preserved smock mill built c. 1840.
Drinkstone Post Mill		Drinkstone	Post mill built in 1689. It is the oldest surviving windmill in Suffolk. Grade I listed building.
Drinkstone Smock Mill		Drinkstone	Smock mill built in 1780. It is the oldest surviving smock mill in Suffolk. Grade II listed building.
Eastbridge Windpump		Stowmarket	Smock mill built in 1979 at the Museum of East Anglian Life which has been restored to working order.
Eye Castle		Eye	Medieval motte-and-bailey castle built in 1071 by William Malet with a prominent Victorian addition built by Edward Kerrison in 1844. Grade I listed building.
Mid-Suffolk Light Railway		Brockford	Heritage railway, currently the only steam preservation railway in Suffolk.
Museum of East Anglian Life		Stowmarket	Museum focusing on the agricultural history of East Anglia, presenting it through a mixture of exhibits and living history demonstrations.
St Mary's Church, Badley		Badley	Redundant Anglican church built in 1200 with an unaltered Georgian interior. Grade I listed building.
Webster's Mill, Framsden		Framsden	Preserved post mill built in 1760. Grade II* listed building.
Wingfield Castle		Wingfield	Medieval castle built c. 1385, of which the south curtain wall, gatehouse and east drawbridge survive alongside a 16th-century house. It is the ancestral home of the Wingfield family. Grade I listed building.

== West Suffolk ==
Name	Image	Location	Description
Gazeley Windmill		Gazeley	Tower mill built in 1844 which has been converted to residential accommodation.
Lower Mill, Dalham		Dalham	Preserved smock mill built in the 1790s. Grade II* listed building.
Newmarket Racecourse		Newmarket	Horse racing venue, often referred to as the headquarters of British horse racing, which hosts two of the country's five Classic Races – the 1,000 Guineas and 2,000 Guineas.
RAF Lakenheath		Lakenheath	Royal Air Force station which hosts United States Air Force units and personnel.
RAF Mildenhall		Mildenhall	Royal Air Force station that primarily supports United States Air Force operations and is currently the home of the 100th Air Refueling Wing.
Thetford Forest		Santon Downham	Largest lowland pine forest in Britain. It is a Site of Special Scientific Interest and has a high level of biodiversity, being home to muntjac, roe deer, woodlarks and hares amongst others.
Ancient House, Clare		Clare	14th-century timber-framed house with exhibits of local history and archaeology. Grade I listed building.
Bardwell Windmill		Bardwell	Tower mill built in 1823 which is under restoration. Grade II* listed building.
Bury St Edmunds Abbey		Bury St Edmunds	Ruins of an 11th-century Benedictine abbey that was once one of the richest Benedictine abbeys in England and a centre of pilgrimage as the burial place of St. Edmund. Grade I listed building.
Collis Mill, Great Thurlow		Great Thurlow	Restored smock mill built in 1807. It is the oldest surviving smock mill with its sails in Suffolk. Grade II* listed building.
Clare Castle		Clare	Ruins of a Norman motte-and-bailey castle with a stone keep, which in the 14th century was the home of Elizabeth de Clare, one of the richest women in England. Grade II* listed building.
Euston Hall		Euston	Country house built in 1666 by Henry Bennet, Earl of Arlington that is now the family home of the Dukes of Grafton. It is set in parkland by William Kent and Capability Brown. Grade II* listed building.
Historic Centre of Bury St Edmunds		Bury St Edmunds	Historic market town, one of the royal towns of the Saxons, which contains a large number of historic buildings reflecting its long history and is the cultural centre of west Suffolk.
Ickworth House		Bury St Edmunds	Neoclassical country house built from 1795 to 1829 by Frederick Hervey and set in parkland. Grade I listed building.
Pakenham Windmill		Pakenham	Restored tower mill built in 1831 which is maintained in working order. Grade II* listed building.
Stansfield Windmill		Stansfield	Derelict tower mill built in 1840.
St. Edmundsbury Cathedral		Bury St Edmunds	Anglican cathedral built in 1503 that is the seat of the Diocese of St Edmundsbury and Ipswich. Grade I listed building.
Theatre Royal, Bury St Edmunds		Bury St Edmunds	Restored Regency theatre built by William Wilkins in 1819. Grade I listed building, one of only eight grade I listed theatres in the UK.
Thelnetham Windmill		Thelnetham	Restored tower mill built in 1819. Grade II* listed building.
Tutelina Mill, Great Welnetham		Great Whelnetham	Conserved tower mill built in 1865. Grade II listed building.
Upthorpe Mill, Stanton		Stanton, Suffolk	Post mill built in 1751 which has been restored to working order. Grade II* listed building.
West Stow Anglo-Saxon Village		West Stow	Archaeological site and open-air museum with evidence for intermittent human habitation stretching from the Mesolithic to Anglo-Saxon periods. The 7th-century Anglo-Saxon site has been reconstructed as an experimental archaeological project.

== East Suffolk ==
Name	Image	Location	Description
Aldeburgh Martello Tower		Aldeburgh	Quatrefoil martello tower, the largest and northernmost of 103 English defensive towers built between 1808 and 1812 to resist a Napoleonic invasion and the only surviving building of the fishing village of Slaughden, which had been washed away by the North Sea by 1936. Grade II* listed building.
Bawdsey Manor		Bawdsey	Victorian manor house built in 1886 most notable for the role it had to play in the development of radar during the Second World War, during its time as an Air Ministry research station. Grade II* listed building.
Burgh Windmill		Burgh	Tower mill built in 1842 which has been converted to residential accommodation. Grade II listed building.
Buttrum's Mill, Woodbridge		Woodbridge	Tower mill built in 1836 which has been restored to working order. Grade II listed building.
Fort Green Mill, Aldeburgh		Aldeburgh	Tower mill built in 1824 which has been converted to residential accommodation.
Framlingham Castle		Framlingham	Medieval castle established in 1148 with a curtain wall, an unusual feature at the time. Grade I listed building.
Friston Windmill		Friston	Conserved post mill built in 1812. Grade II* listed building.
Greyfriars, Dunwich		Dunwich	Ruins of a Franciscan friary founded before 1277, but abandoned in 1289 due to coastal erosion. Grade II* listed building.
Havergate Island		Orford	The only island in Suffolk and a marshy RSPB nature reserve notable for its populations of avocets and terns.
Historic Centre of Dunwich and its Seafront		Dunwich	Former capital of the Kingdom of the East Angles, but most of the town has been lost to the sea due to coastal erosion beginning in 1286, events for which it has become famous. The town features the remains of many churches, friaries and a leper hospital.
Historic Centre of Felixstowe and its Seafront		Felixstowe	Edwardian seaside town and port, the largest container port in the United Kingdom.
Historic Centre of Woodbridge and its Seafront		Woodbridge, Suffolk	Town with over 1,100 years of recorded history with historic buildings and harbour.
House in the Clouds		Thorpeness	Water tower built in 1923 with the appearance of a weatherboarded building more in keeping with Thorpeness's mock-Tudor and Jacobean style, except seeming to float above the trees. Grade II listed building.
Landguard Fort		Felixstowe	Fort built by James I to guard the entrance to Harwich. Grade I listed building.
Leiston Abbey		Theberton	Ruins of an Augustinian abbey built in 1182 by Ranulf de Glanvill. Grade I listed building.
Long Shop Museum		Leiston	Industrial museum dedicated to the history of Richard Garrett & Sons who manufactured agricultural machinery, Steam engines and Trolleybuses in Leiston. Grade II* listed building.
Orford Castle		Orford	Medieval castle with a well-preserved keep, described as 'one of the most remarkable keeps in England', built by Henry II from 1165 to 1173 to consolidate royal power in the region. It is of a unique design and probably based on Byzantine architecture. Grade I listed building.
Orford Ness		Orford	Cuspate foreland shingle spit that is an internationally important site for nature conservation, as it contains a significant portion of the European reserve of vegetated shingle habitat, which is internationally scarce, highly fragile and very easily damaged.
Orfordness Beacon		Orford	Early radio navigation system introduced in July 1929. It allowed the angle to the station to be measured from any aircraft or ship with a conventional radio receiver, and was accurate to about a degree.
Orfordness Lighthouse		Orford	Lighthouse built in 1792 and decommissioned in 2013.
RAF Bentwaters		Tunstall	Former Royal Air Force station used by the RAF during the Second World War and United States Air Force during the Cold War. It now forms part of Bentwaters Cold War Museum.
RAF Woodbridge		Woodbridge	Former Royal Air Force military airfield constructed in 1943 to assist damaged aircraft to land on their return from raids over Germany during the Second World War. It was then used by the United States Air Force during the Cold War and split into Woodbridge Airfield and Rock Barracks in 2006.
RSPB Minsmere		Minsmere	RSPB nature reserve covering areas of reed bed, lowland heath, lowland wet grassland, and shingle vegetation. It has populations of Eurasian bitterns, Western marsh harriers and Pied avocets and is a birdwatching site.
Saxtead Green Windmill		Saxtead	Restored 18th-century post mill. Grade II* listed building.
Skoulding's Mill, Kelsale		Kelsale	Tower mill built in 1856 which has been converted to residential accommodation. Grade II listed building.
Snape Maltings		Snape	Arts complex that is one of the main sites of the annual Aldeburgh Festival originally used for the malting of barley for the brewing of beer.
St. Andrew's Church, Bramfield		Bramfield, Suffolk	13th-century Anglican church with the only flint-built detached round tower in Suffolk, which was possibly built as a defensive stronghold for the nearby manor house. Grade I listed building.
Suffolk Coast and Heaths		Aldeburgh	Area of Outstanding Natural Beauty covering much of the Suffolk coastline, including ancient woodland, shingle beaches, mudflats, reed beds, salt marsh and heathland.
Sutton Hoo		Woodbridge	Site of two 6th- and early 7th-century cemeteries. One contained an undisturbed ship burial, including a wealth of Anglo-Saxon artefacts of outstanding art-historical and archaeological significance, most of which are now in the British Museum in London.
Thorpeness Windmill		Thorpeness	Post mill built in 1803 in Aldringham and moved to Thorpeness in 1923. Grade II listed building.
Tricker's Mill, Woodbridge		Woodbridge	Tower mill built in 1818 which has been incorporated to a sheltered housing scheme. It is the oldest intact tower mill in Suffolk. Grade II listed building.
Westwood Marshes Mill, Walberswick		Walberswick	Derelict 18th-century tower mill. It is the oldest surviving tower mill in Suffolk.
Woodbridge Tide Mill		Woodbridge	Tide mill built c. 1536. It is a rare example of a fully functioning tide mill, whose water wheel is capable of grinding wholemeal flour. Grade I listed building.
Blackshore Mill, Reydon		Reydon	Conserved tower mill built c. 1890. Grade II listed building.
Blundeston Windmill		Blundeston	Tower mill built c. 1820 which has been converted to residential accommodation.
Bungay Castle		Bungay	Ruins of a Norman keep and bailey castle built in 1100 by Roger Bigod of Norfolk. Grade I listed building.
Church of Holton St. Peter		Holton St. Peter	11th-century Norman church with the tallest round church tower in the county. Grade II* listed building.
Corton Windmill		Corton	Tower mill built in 1837 which has been converted to residential accommodation. Grade II listed building.
East Anglia Transport Museum		Lowestoft	Open-air transport museum, with numerous historic public transport vehicles, including many in full working order.
Flixton Road Mill, Bungay		Bungay	Tower mill built in 1830 which has been truncated and converted to residential accommodation. Grade II listed building.
Herringfleet Windmill		Herringfleet	Restored smock mill built c. 1820 which has been restored to working order. It is the oldest working smock mill in Suffolk. Grade II* listed building.
Historic Centre of Lowestoft and its Seafront		Lowestoft	Historic port town, which developed due to the fishing industry, and a traditional seaside resort. It has a long history, some of the earliest evidence of settlement in Britain being found here. It has wide, sandy beaches, two piers and a number of other tourist attractions and historic buildings.
Holton Windmill		Holton	Preserved post mill built in 1749. It is the oldest surviving windmill with its sails in Suffolk. Grade II listed building.
Lound Windmill		Lound, Suffolk	Tower mill built in 1837 which has been converted to residential accommodation.
Lowestoft Lighthouse		Lowestoft	Lighthouse built in 1874 to give warning of the dangerous sandbanks around the coast. It is one of only two working lighthouses in Suffolk. Grade II listed building.
Lowestoft War Memorial Museum		Lowestoft	Headquarters of the Royal Naval Patrol Service during the Second World War which now houses a museum dedicated to the effect of the First and Second World Wars.
Mettingham Castle		Mettingham	Fortified manor house built by Sir John de Norwich in 1342. Grade II listed building.
Mincarlo		Lowestoft	Last surviving fishing trawler of the Lowestoft fishing fleet and last built in the town. It is now maintained as a museum.
Ness Point		Lowestoft	The most easterly point in the United Kingdom, marked by a direction marker, known as Euroscope. It is also the location of Britain's tallest wind turbine.
Norfolk and Suffolk Aviation Museum		Flixton	Museum collection of aircraft and aviation-related artefacts
Somerleyton Hall		Somerleyton	Country house built in 1604 in Tudor-Jacobean style before being transformed into an Anglo-Italian masterpiece in 1843. Its garden contains a yew hedge maze considered one of the finest in the country. Grade II* listed building.
Southwold Lighthouse		Southwold	Lighthouse built in 1889. It is one of only two working lighthouses in Suffolk and a prominent local landmark. Grade II listed building.
Southwold Pier		Southwold	Historic pier built in 1900 that includes a collection of modern coin-operated novelty machines designed by Tim Hunkin.
St Andrew's Church, Covehithe		Covehithe	Redundant Anglican church built in the 17th century within the walls of a larger 14th-century church. Grade I listed building.
