= Bradfield St George =

Village in Suffolk, England

Coordinates: 52.205°N 0.8°E

Bradfield St. George
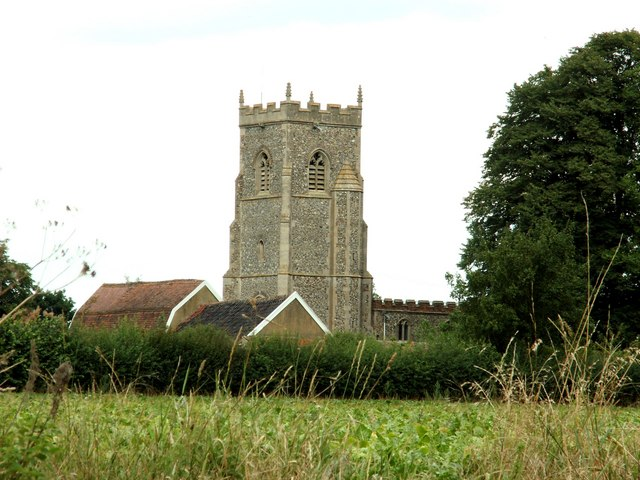

- Location within Suffolk
- Interactive map of Bradfield St. George
- Population: 420 (2011)
- District: West Suffolk
- Shire county: Suffolk
- Region: East
- Country: England
- Sovereign state: United Kingdom
- Post town: Bury St Edmunds
- Postcode district: IP30
- Dialling code: 01284
- Police: Suffolk
- Fire: Suffolk
- Ambulance: East of England

Bradfield St. George is a village and civil parish located in the West Suffolk district of Suffolk, England, about 6 miles (9.7 km) south of Bury St Edmunds. In 2011 the parish had a population of 420.

According to Eilert Ekwall the meaning of the village name is 'broad field'.

The Domesday Book records the population (including Bradfield Combust and Bradfield St Clare) to be 76 people in 1086. In 2001, the population was 386 people (not including Bradfield Combust and Bradfield St Clare).

St George's Church contains an east window by the noted Pre-Raphaelite artist and designer Edward Arthur Fellowes Prynne

The village has a village hall built in 1955 which holds many events like the village fireworks night, special occasions and Friday night dinner evenings (once monthly).

The village had a forge; a wheelwright; a school; a post office; three pubs and a windmill, all of which, other than one of the pubs (Fox and Hounds), are now private houses. The Fox and Hounds closed in 2012 and is now The Solstice Wellbeing Centre providing psychotherapy; yoga; qigong, and meditation, and is also used by local tai chi and gongfu (kung fu) schools.

The village is home to former England Cricketer and Sky Sports commentator Nick Knight.

== In literature ==
The village was the setting for Adrian Bell's book Corduroy, published in 1930, though in the book Bell calls Bradfield "Benfield". Corduroy is the author's account of his life as a young man, forsaking the fashionable ballrooms and cocktail parties of Inter-war era Mayfair, to learn farming in Suffolk. Though unsentimental, Corduroy is at times thoughtful, humorous and wistful. Bell expertly depicts the joys, hardships and crises not just of farming, but of all rural life, made the more interesting for being told by a man who came to it as an outsider. Bell tells of ploughing, harvesting, livestock and grain markets, shooting, beating, ferreting and foxhunting, and the importance of nature and religion as twin pillars of the Suffolk countryman's life.
