= Church of St Clare, Bradfield =

Coordinates: 52.1849°N 0.792°E

- Church of St Clare, Bradfield St Clare
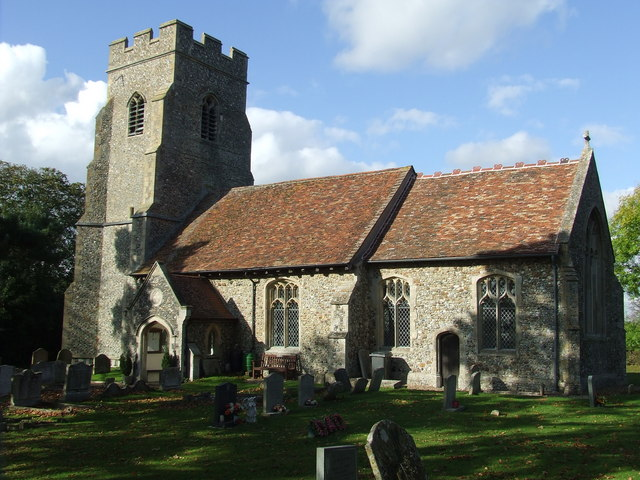
- Church of St Clare, Bradfield in 2008

- Location in Suffolk
- OS grid reference: TL 909 577
- Location: Bradfield St Clare, Suffolk
- Country: England
- Denomination: Anglican

History
- Dedication: All Saints

Architecture
- Heritage designation: Grade II*
- Designated: 14 July 1955
- Architectural type: Church
- Style: Perpendicular Gothic

Specifications
- Materials: Flint with limestone dressings

The Church of St Clare, Bradfield is the Anglican parish church of Bradfield St Clare, in the district of West Suffolk, Suffolk. The original structure dates back to the 12th century, with modifications being made through the 13th, 14th and 15th centuries. The building was restored in 1874. It is a Grade II* listed building.

== The ejection of Paul Gosnold ==
In November 1643 several parishioners - Robert Bragg, Laurence Hunt, Thomas Kinge, William Rose and Thomas Worton - complained about the rector Paul Gosnold. They drew a list of seven articles providing details of how Gosnold had preached in a scandalous way. They claimed he preached that those who took up arms against the king would find that these arms would rot. On another occasion he compared parliament to a company of owls trying to oust the Princely Eagle whose sight was much quicker. He refused to publish the ordnances, but however published a declaration by King Charles I. They claimed he was a drunkard and gave further account of how he had denounced the parliamentarians, showed no concern about ministers being summoned to Westminster for expressing such hostile views. Further he had then been absent from the parish having previously neglected his duties. These articles were submitted to the Committee for Plundered Ministers but then forwarded to the First Suffolk Committee for Scandalous Ministers who considered the matter on 20 March 1644 (new calendar). The Earl of Manchester issued a warrant for Gosnold's ejection two days later. Initially he was succeeded by his brother-in-law, John Blemel, an assistant master at Bury Grammar School. However this was not approved by the Suffolk Committee. Manchester received a further communication from the Suffolk County Committee, saying that Gosnold had now been absent for 6 months and requesting Samuel Crossman be appointed as his replacement, which was done. By August 1644 Gosnold was preaching before the Royalist parliament in Oxford.

== List of rectors ==
The rectors of the church from 1578 to 1873.

- Richard Wadnowle (d. Jan. 1578)
- Richard Grandidge (d. Dec, 1619)
- Thomas Aldrich (d. Nov. 1640)
- Paul Gosnold, ejected March 1643
- Samuel Crossman, instituted April 1644.
- Thomas Constable (late vicar of Lindsell, Essex), instituted July 1661. d. July 1672.
- Charles Pleys (d. June 1720)
- I. Young signs in 1755 and 1759.
- Robert Davers B.A. (also rector of Bradfield S. George) instituted 1815.
- T. Henry Elwin M.A., instituted 1824.
- William Airy M.A., instituted 1833.
- Stuteville Isaacson M.A., instituted 1836.
- George S. Faught, instituted 1867.
- Alexander Swiney, LL.M. (of Peterhouse, Cambridge), instituted 1873
