= List of settlements in Suffolk by population =

The largest settlements of the county of Suffolk, with the county town in bold, and district centres in yellow.

This is a list of settlements in Suffolk by population based on the results of the 2011 census. The next United Kingdom census will take place in 2021. In 2011, there were 18 built-up area subdivisions with 5,000 or more inhabitants in Suffolk, shown in the table below.

This not a list of parishes or their populations, but of settlements as defined by the ONS.

== Population ranking ==
#	Settlement	Borough/District	Population	
#	Settlement	Borough/District	2001	2011
1	Ipswich	Ipswich	127,790	144,957
2	Lowestoft	East Suffolk	68,850	70,945
3	Bury St Edmunds	West Suffolk	35,470	41,113
4	Haverhill	West Suffolk	22,010	27,041
5	Felixstowe	East Suffolk	23,921	23,564
6	Sudbury	Babergh	20,190	22,213
7	Newmarket	West Suffolk	18,600	20,384
8	Stowmarket	Mid Suffolk	15,240	19,280
9	Kesgrave	East Suffolk	14,000	18,975
10	Beccles	East Suffolk	13,040	13,868
11	Mildenhall	West Suffolk	13,080	13,388
12	Woodbridge	East Suffolk	10,956	11,341
13	Brandon	West Suffolk	8,256	9,145
14	Hadleigh	Babergh	7,120	8,150
15	Leiston	East Suffolk	5,416	5,643
16	Trimley St Mary	East Suffolk	5,617	5,607
17	Halesworth	East Suffolk	5,454	5,558
18	Bungay	East Suffolk	4,895	5,127
19	Needham Market	Mid Suffolk	4,574	4,528
