= Bardwell Windmill =

Windmill in Bardwell, Suffolk, England

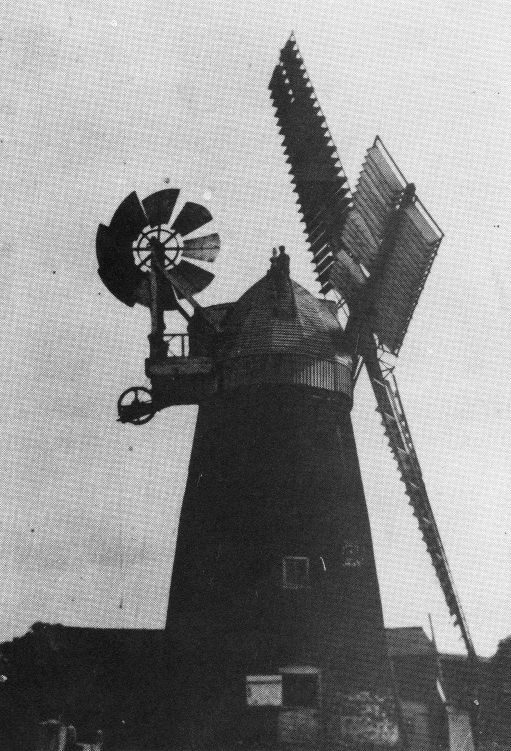
- The mill in 1910

Origin
- Mill name: Bardwell Mill
- Mill location: TL 941 738
- Coordinates: 52°19′40″N 0°50′58″E
- Operator(s): Private
- Year built: 1823

Information
- Purpose: Corn mill
- Type: Tower mill
- Storeys: Four storeys
- No. of sails: Four Sails
- Type of sails: Patent sails
- Winding: Fantail
- Fantail blades: Eight blades
- No. of pairs of millstones: Two pairs

Bardwell Mill is a Grade II* listed tower mill at Bardwell, Suffolk, England, which is under restoration.

== History ==
Bardwell Mill was built in 1823. It worked by wind until 1925 and then by a Blackstone oil engine until 1941. The mill was derelict in 1978 but was later purchased by James Waterfield, who completed the restoration of the mill in 1985. The mill was sold to Geoffrey and Enid Wheeler in July 1987. On 16 October 1987, the mill was tailwinded when one of the gears in the fantail drive system became disengaged. The result was that the windshaft sheared at the rear of the canister, bringing the sails crashing to the ground. Restoration work began again in 1989 but was hampered by limited funds. Geoffrey Wheeler died in 1995 and in 1997 The Friends of Bardwell Windmill was set up. English Heritage and St Edmundsbury Borough Council gave over £73,000 towards the estimated cost of £92,000 to restore the mill. The balance was to be raised by the Friends. A replacement cap, cast iron windshaft and fantail were fitted to the mill in 2004.

Owing to rising costs, it was decided that the new sails would be constructed by volunteer labour. The first pair of sails were completed by late summer 2008 and fitted in late 2010. The second pair of sails were fitted in April 2012.

== Description ==
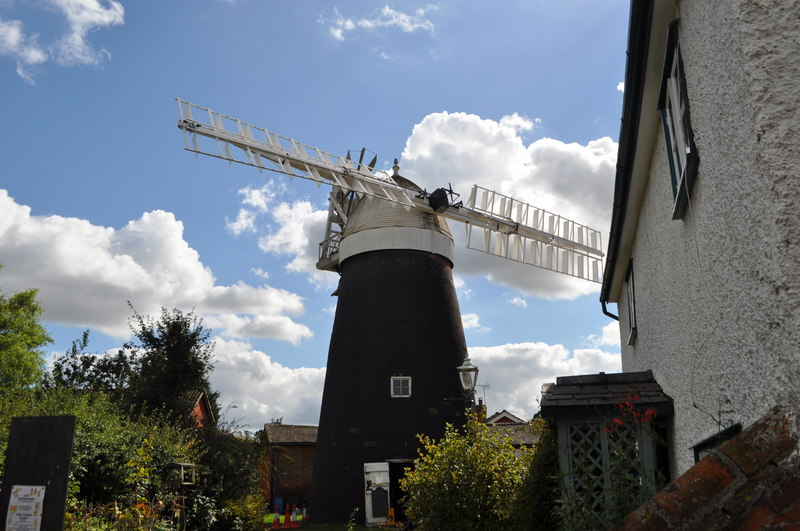
The mill with sails, 2010

Bardwell Mill is a four-storey tower mill. The beehive cap is winded by a fantail. When fitted, the four double Patent sails have a span of 63 feet (19.20 m) and are carried on a cast-iron windshaft which was cast in 1989 (the original windshaft in the mill was cast in two pieces). The brake wheel is wood, driving a cast-iron wallower carried on a wooden upright shaft. The wooden great spur wheel drives two pairs of overdrift millstones. A wooden crownwheel on the upright shaft drives a sack hoist.

== Millers ==
- Geoffrey Wheeler 1987–95
- James Waterfield 1985–87
- Simon Wooster 1987

References for above:

== Public access ==
The mill is open to the public "at any reasonable time".
