= Upthorpe Mill, Stanton =

Windmill in Stanton, Suffolk, England

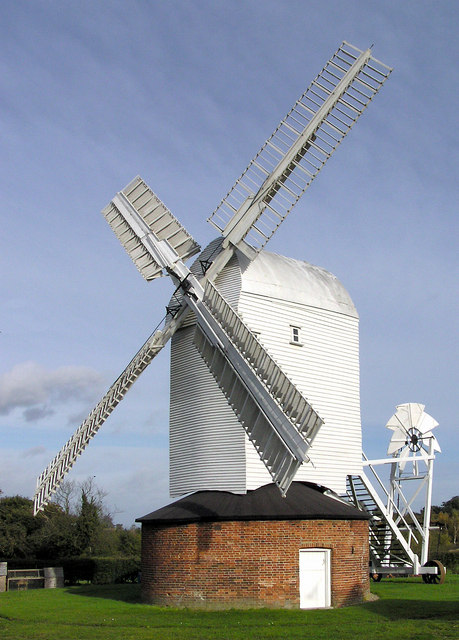
- Upthorpe Mill, November 2006

Origin
- Mill name: Upthorpe Mill
- Mill location: TL 971 733
- Coordinates: 52°19′20″N 0°53′28″E
- Operator(s): Private owner
- Year built: 1751

Information
- Purpose: Corn mill
- Type: Post mill
- Roundhouse storeys: One storey
- No. of sails: Four sails
- Type of sails: Double Patent sails
- Windshaft: Wood, cast iron Poll End
- Winding: Fantail
- Fantail blades: Eight blades
- No. of pairs of millstones: Two pairs
- Other information: Scheduled monument

Upthorpe Mill is a Grade II* listed post mill and scheduled monument at Stanton, Suffolk, England, which has been restored to working order.

== History ==
Upthorpe Mill was built in 1751. It was originally built as an open trestle post mill. In 1818 it was moved to its present site. At some point in time the Common sails were replaced by Double Patent sails, a roundhouse later being added and a fantail fitted to turn the mill into wind automatically. The mill ended its commercial working life on a single pair of sails. It was disused by 1918 and in 1937 was becoming derelict. Rex Wailes inspected the mill on behalf of the Society for the Protection of Ancient Buildings and an appeal for funds to restore the mill was launched in 1938. In 1939, millwright Amos Clarke, along with Messrs Hunts of Soham commenced repairs which cost £600. A new side girt was fitted to the left side of the mill and the roundhouse roof was repaired. The tailstones were removed at this time. The intention was to fit the cast iron windshaft from Great Mill, Wickhambrook in place of the existing wooden windshaft and to add a new pair of sails but this work was not done owing to the outbreak of the Second World War. The mill was painted grey to reduce its conspicuousness as a landmark, as it was close to RAF Shepherds Grove. The mill was worked during the war, but ceased to be used in 1946 as it was unprofitable. By the late 1960s, the mill was again becoming derelict, and the fantail was carefully dismantled by Chris Hullcoop and Philip Lennard. In 1979, emergency repairs were carried out by Suffolk Mills Group and in 1986 the mill was bought by Richard Duke. Restoration work was carried out and the mill was able to grind again in 1990. In 1993, the mill was bought by Peter Dolman and further restoration work was carried out.

== Description ==
Upthorpe Mill is a post mill on a single-storey roundhouse. It has two pairs of Double Patent sails carried on a wooden windshaft with a cast-iron poll end. This carries a wooden brake wheel with iron segment teeth, driving a cast-iron wallower mounted on a wooden upright shaft. The cast iron great spur wheel drives two pairs of underdrift millstones. The tail stones were driven by belt. The tail of the mill has been extended to provide room for a wire machine. The eight bladed Fantail is mounted on the rear ladder in the Suffolk style and drove both wheels by means of gears and shafts. The main post carries the inscription R Rix 1807.

== Millers ==
- William Bryant 1939–46
- Richard Duke 1990–93
- Peter Dolman 1993–2002
- John Craven 2002–2004
- Dominic Grixti from 2004

References for above:-

== Public access ==
Upthorpe Mill is not open to the public.
