= Bradfield St Clare =

Village in Suffolk, England

Coordinates: 52.184°N 0.791°E

Bradfield St. Clare
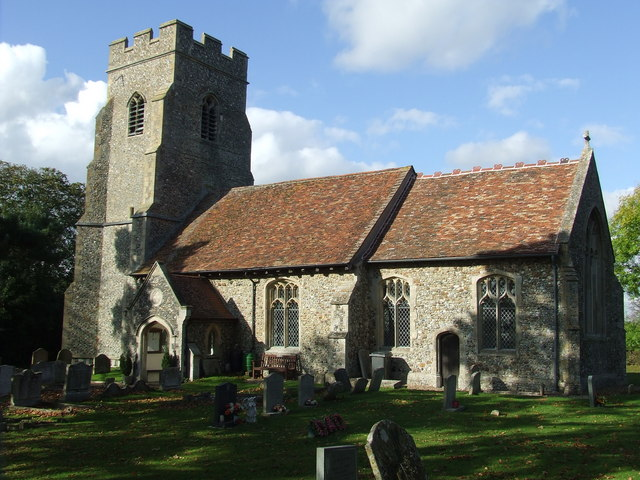
- The church of St Clare, Bradfield St Clare

- Location within Suffolk
- Interactive map of Bradfield St. Clare
- Population: 143 (2011 census)
- District: West Suffolk
- Shire county: Suffolk
- Region: East
- Country: England
- Sovereign state: United Kingdom
- Post town: Bury St Edmunds
- Postcode district: IP30

Bradfield St. Clare is a village and civil parish in the West Suffolk district of Suffolk, England, about six miles south of Bury St Edmunds. According to Eilert Ekwall, the meaning of the village's name is "the wide field".

The Domesday Book records the population of Bradfield St. Clare in 1086 to be 76; this includes Bradfield Combust and Bradfield St George. It was at that point held by the St Cleer family (whose name it still bears) on behalf of the Abbey of Bury St Edmunds. By 1493 it was owned by John Jerveys, and by 1552 was linked to the Davers family.

A Church of England school was built in the village 1875, and closed in the 1950s.

The village includes the historic Anglican Church of St Clare, Bradfield, the original structure of which dates back to the 12th century.

It has been speculated that the field of Hellesden, which may be a corruption of Hagelisdon, within the parish, was the site of the martyrdom of St Edmund.

In 1801 the village had 131 inhabitants, rising to 226 by 1831 and remaining stable for several decades. By 1901 the population had declined again to 165, and remained at a similar size up to 1981.
