= Withersfield =

Village in Suffolk, England

Coordinates: 52.106°N 0.418°E

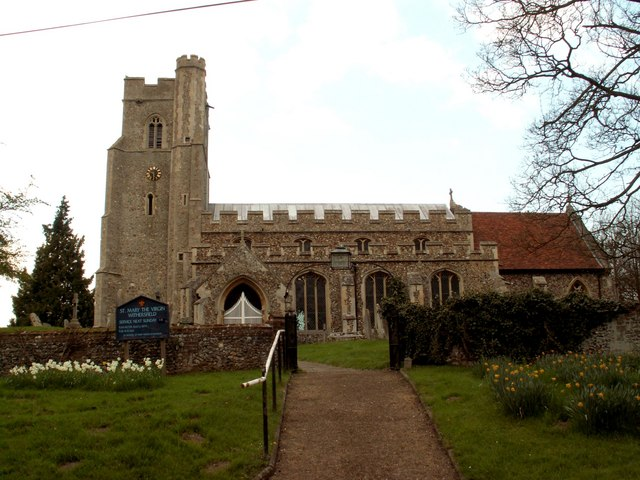
- St. Mary's church, Withersfield

- Location within Suffolk
- Population: 450 (2011)
- District: West Suffolk
- Shire county: Suffolk
- Region: East
- Country: England
- Sovereign state: United Kingdom
- Post town: Haverhill
- Postcode district: CB9
- Police: Suffolk
- Fire: Suffolk
- Ambulance: East of England
- UK Parliament: West Suffolk

Withersfield is a village and civil parish in the West Suffolk district of Suffolk in eastern England. In 2011 its population was 450. It has a public house and a village hall, and centres on the parish church, St. Mary the Virgin. It is in a rural location, surrounded by farmland, yet only a mile north of the busy market town of Haverhill. Surrounding villages include Great Thurlow, Great Wratting, and West Wickham, Cambridgeshire.

== History ==
In 1870, the Imperial Gazetteer of England and Wales described Withersfield as:

"...a parish in Risbridge district, Suffolk; 2 miles N W of Haverhill r. station. It has a post-office under Newmarket. Acres, 2,509. Real property, £3,791. Pop., 624. Houses, 146. The manor belongs to the Rev. W. Mayd. The living is a rectory in the diocese of Ely. Value, £650.* Patron, the Rev. W. Mayd. The church was partly rebuilt and enlarged in 1868. There is a parochial school."

The name Withersfield directly translates in Old English to 'Wether open land' which means an area where rams roam. With the village being set in the middle of the countryside, traditionally most of the population worked in the agriculture industry. in 1881, 100 out of the 133 male population worked in agriculture.

Withersfield appears in the Domesday Book of 1086 in the Risbridge hundred of Suffolk. It was made up of 2 villagers, 13 smallholders, 3 slaves and 2 free men. It held 3 lord’s plough teams and 2 men’s plough teams. It had a meadow of 3 acres and 20 woodland pigs. In 1066 the lords were Alwin, Leofwaru and Wulfmer. In 1086 they were Lord Godard, Lord Payne and Lord Widelard or Balliol.

Withersfield has undergone many boundary changes. It was part of the Risbridge registration district until 1938 when the district was abolished to become the Braintree and Newmarket districts. Withersfield joined the Newmarket registration district until 1989 when the district was abolished with all of its remaining parishes joining Bury St Edmunds. This is the registration district that Withersfield remained in until 2010 when the district size expanded. Withersfield can now be found in the Suffolk registration district.

== Demographics ==
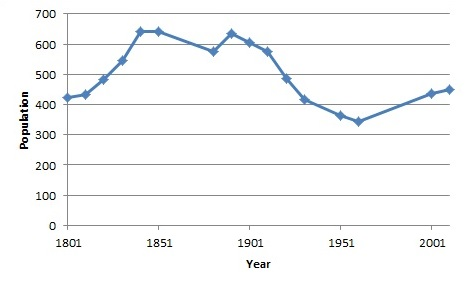
Total Population of Withersfield Civil Parish, Suffolk as reported by the Census of Population from 1801 to 2011

Occupational graph for the male population over the age of 20 in Withersfield in 1831

=== Population ===
The earliest census statistics for Withersfield dates back to 1801. At this time, the population of Withersfield was 424. The highest recorded population for the parish of Withersfield was in 1871, with a population of 670. After 1871, the population decreased until 1961 where the lowest population on record for Withersfield was logged as 345. Ever since, the population count has been steadily increasing and at the 2011 census stood at 450.

=== Occupation ===
The 1831 census data also gave information on occupation in Withersfield, splitting all occupations into 9 different categories. 127 people are included in the data, the two largest categories Agricultural labourers with 82 people and Retail and handicrafts with 25 people employed in this category of work. There were very few people in the other categories and none in the manufacturing segment. The 1881 data for Withersfield is a lot more in depth, showing a breakdown of jobs into smaller categories and then showing how these are split between males and females. A total of 280 people are included in the data, 135 which are males and the remaining 145 female. As you'd expect, the large majority of the female data is put into the 'Unknown Occupation' category, suggesting they were unemployed with only 3 men in this category and a further 12 females in the 'Persons without Specified Occupations' with 2 males. The female occupational distribution for the remaining 49 is split mainly between 'Workers in Dress' (27) and 'Domestic Services and Offices' (13). The males occupational distribution for the remaining 130 is heavily skewed to 'Agriculture' (100) with the next highest sector being 'Workers in House, Furniture and Decorations' (10) all other sectors have up to 4 males working in them. As expected, the occupational structure for the population of Withersfield recorded in the 2011 census was remarkably different. In 2011, 241 people in withersfield were in employment. That’s 54% of the total population of the village. These people were employed in sectors which were non-existent in the report of 1831. The largest employment sector was Manufacturing which accounted for 15.8% of the total employed population of Withersfield, along with Construction (13.7%), Health and Social Care (12%), Professionals (10.8%) and Education (10%). The previously largest employment sector of Agriculture still employed a minority of Withersfield’s population with 2.1% of the employed population still working in that industry.

=== Housing ===
The housing type in Withersfield is mainly detached housing with a minority of semi-detached and terraced housing. Typical housing ownership tends to be owner-occupied with some private rental properties. Withersfield has an average house price of £450,250 which is more than double the average house price in the nearby town of Haverhill (£168,041). House prices in Withersfield are up 77% on the previous year and 19% up on the 2007 average of £377,500.

== Transport ==
The nearest train station to Withersfield is 6.14 miles away in Dullingham. There are currently two bus routes that include Withersfield. These are both bus number 351 which run from Cowlinge to Haverhill at school times and from Great Bradley to Haverhill Monday to Saturday either twice or three times a day. There are currently no bus services for Withersfield on Sundays.

== Education ==
Despite there being no schools in Withersfield itself, there are a total of 18 schools within a 3-mile radius of the village, mainly in Haverhill. There happens to be only 18 people aged 4–16 in full-time education in Withersfield, this is largely down to the population of Withersfield being of an older generation than 4-16. Yet there are also 6 people aged 16 and older in full-time education from Withersfield.

== Places of interest ==
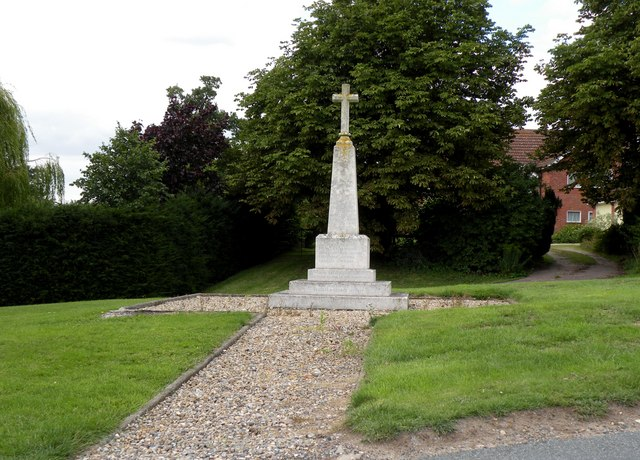
The Withersfield War Memorial - geograph.org.uk - 1428242

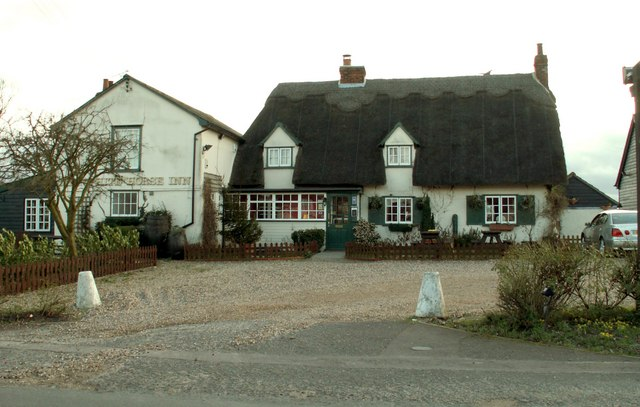
'The White Horse Inn' at Withersfield - geograph.org.uk - 311017

=== St Mary The Virgin ===
The church of St Mary the Virgin is set in the centre of Withersfield. The church dates back to the 13th century, yet only the door handle survives from this era. The majority of the church is in fact Victorian having had to be rebuilt due to poor structure. The church is unlike most in the area and is kept open 24/7. The church is one of 24 listed buildings in the village of Withersfield.

=== Withersfield War Memorial ===
The Withersfield War memorial stands on the village green. The memorial commemorates the residents of Withersfield who were killed or missing in action in either World War 1 or World War 2. It holds 15 names from World War 1 and 1 name from World War 2. The memorial was unveiled on 12 August 1921. The War Memorial was restored in 2019 by the Parish Council with a grant from the War Memorials Trust http://www.warmemorials.org/

=== Jacob's Manor ===
Jacob's Manor is a Grade II* listed early Georgian manor house of architectural importance. Built by Sir John Jacob (whose tomb is in St Mary's Church) for his son in-law Reverend A. Oakes (of St Mary's Church), it featured in the Hand in Glove episode of the BBC Drama The Inspector Alleyn Mysteries.

=== The White Horse Inn ===
The White Horse Inn was built in the seventeenth century as a coaching inn to take advantage of stagecoach traffic between Ipswich, Cambridge and Colchester. The pub is now well known for being owned in the 19th and 20th century by the uncle of Australian Cricket legend Donald Bradman. The White Horse Inn is also one of Withersfields 24 listed buildings with its main feature being its thatched roof.

== Organisations ==
=== Withersfield Parish Council ===
The Parish Council plays an important role in providing and managing services such as the village hall and community areas within Withersfield. The Parish Council meet regularly at the Withersfield Village Hall.

=== Withersfield Cricket Club ===
Withersfield Cricket club are a small village cricket club. The club has made its way up to the Hunts County Bats Sunday League. The cricket club play at the Recreation Ground in Withersfield. The legendary Australian cricketer Don Bradman could trace his family history to Withersfield.

=== Withersfield Hall School of Equitation ===
Withersfield Hall School of Equitation (WHSE) is a small family run horse riding school. They offer horse riding lessons to people of all ages and abilities in many different disciplines such as jumping, dressage training and hacking. They also offer BHS (British Horse Society) training in Horse care and equitation. The equitation school is based on a farm near by to the Withersfield Village hall.
