= Suffolk =

County of England

- Non-metropolitan and ceremonial county
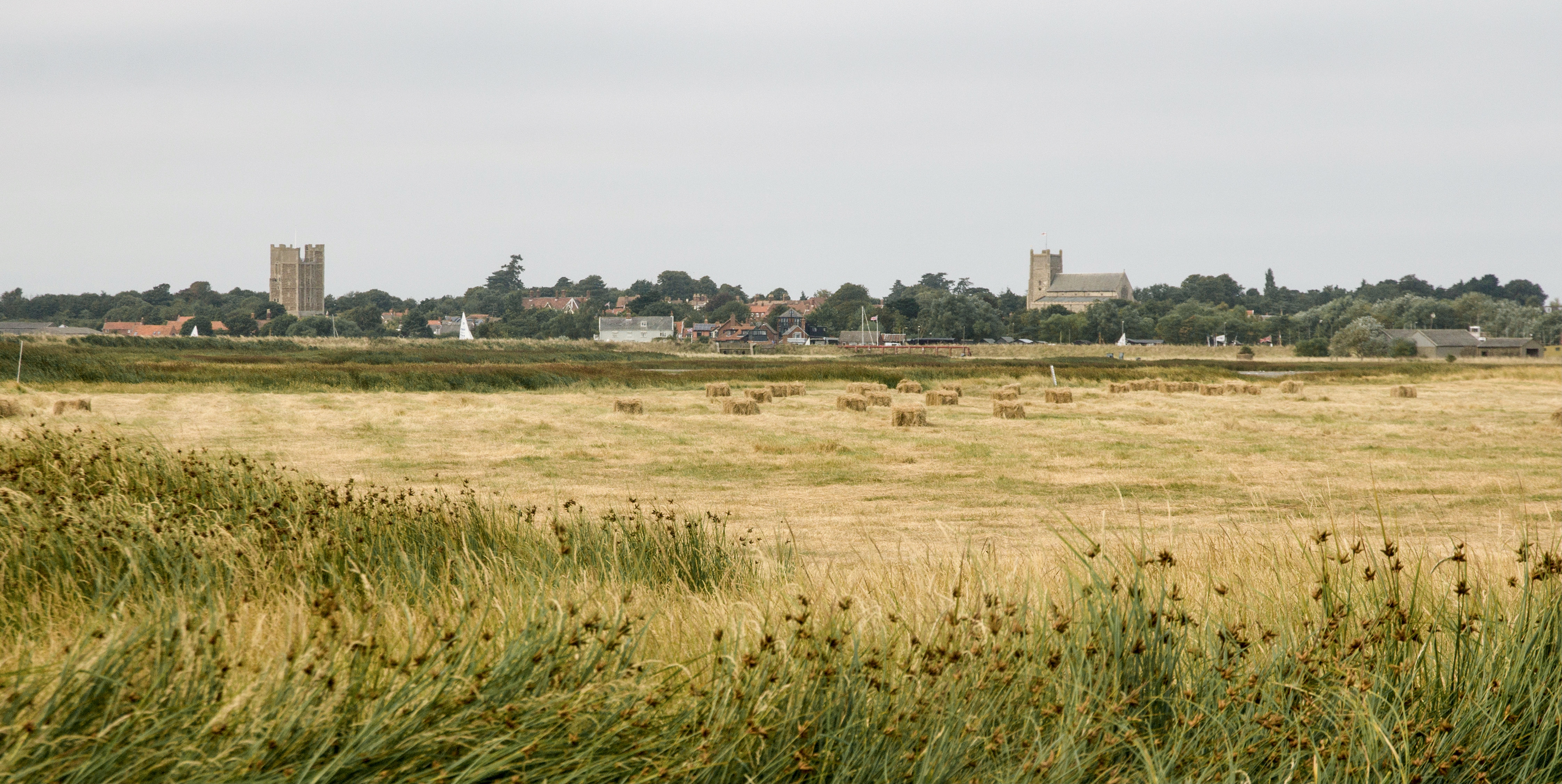
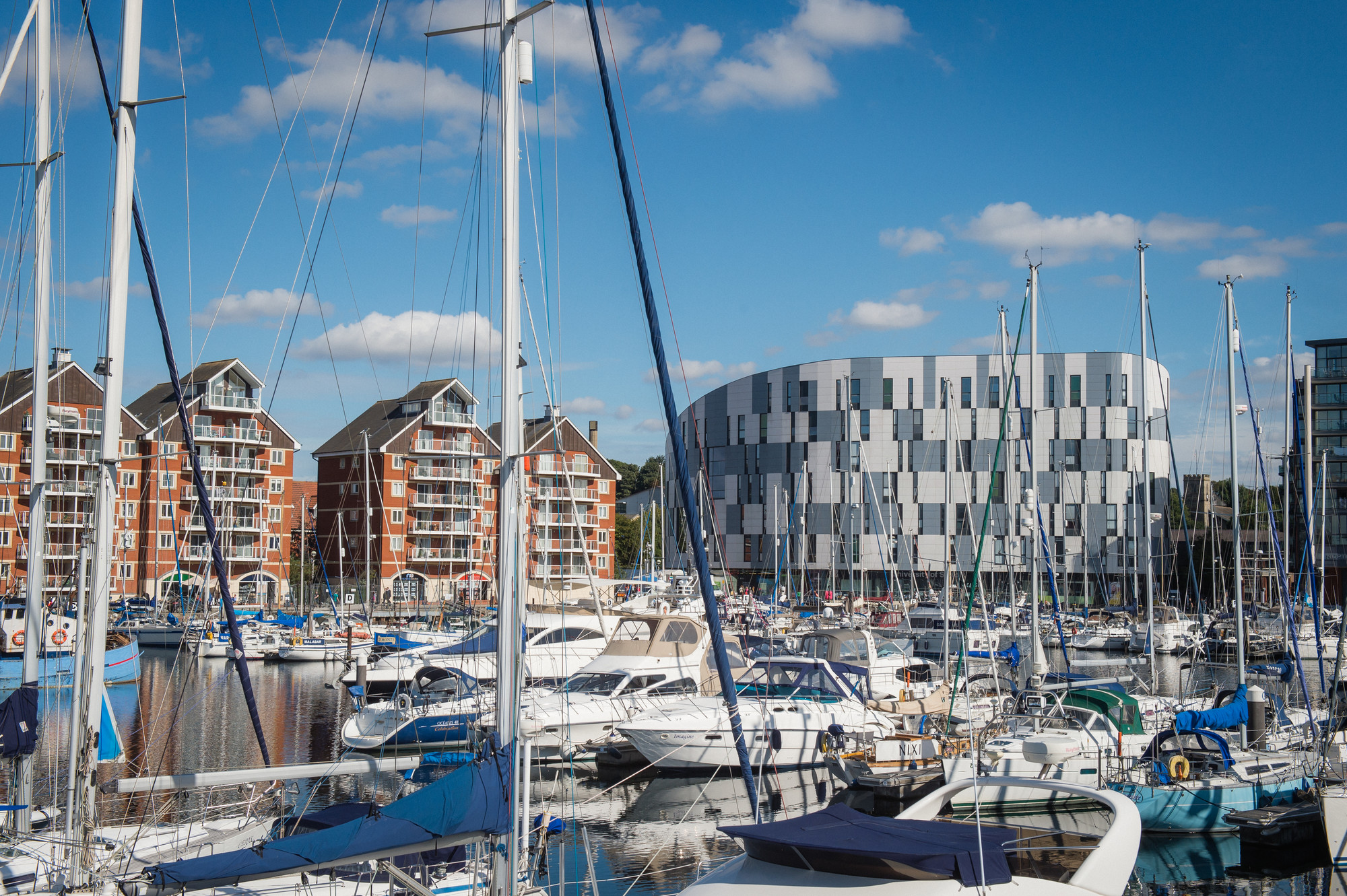
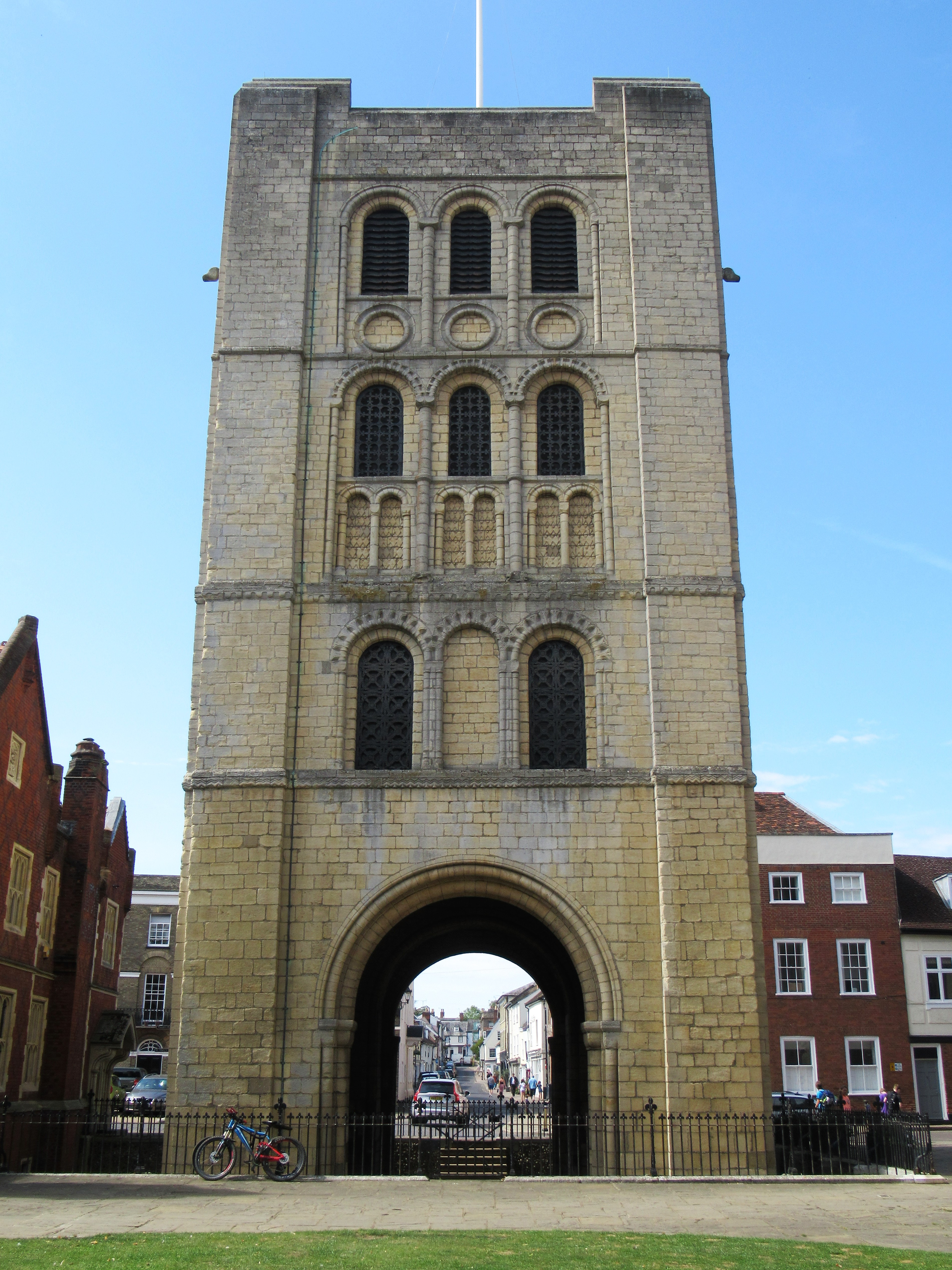
- The village of Orford from Orford Ness, Ipswich waterfront, and the Norman Tower, Bury St Edmunds

- Coordinates: 52°12′N 1°00′E
- Sovereign state: United Kingdom
- Constituent country: England
- Region: East
- Established: Ancient
- Time zone: UTC+0 (GMT)
  - Summer (DST): UTC+1 (BST)
- UK Parliament: List of MPs
- Police: Suffolk Constabulary
- County town and largest town: Ipswich
- Ceremonial county
- Lord Lieutenant: Clare FitzRoy, Countess of Euston
- High Sheriff: Oliver William Paul
- Area: 3,800 km^{2} (1,500 sq mi)
  - Rank: 8th of 48
- Population (2024): 786,231
  - Rank: 33rd of 48
  - Density: 207/km^{2} (540/sq mi)
- Non-metropolitan county
- County council: Suffolk County Council
- Control: Reform UK
- Admin HQ: Ipswich
- Area: 3,800 km^{2} (1,500 sq mi)
  - Rank: 4th of 21
- Population (2025): 789,850
  - Rank: 14th of 21
  - Density: 208/km^{2} (540/sq mi)
- ISO 3166-2: GB-SFK
- GSS code: E10000029
- ITL: UKH14
- Website: suffolk.gov.uk
- Districts
- Districts of Suffolk
- Districts: List: Ipswich; East Suffolk; Mid Suffolk; Babergh; West Suffolk

Suffolk (/ˈsʌfək/ SUF-ək) is a ceremonial county in the East of England and East Anglia. It is bordered by Norfolk to the north, the North Sea to the east, Essex to the south, and Cambridgeshire to the west. Ipswich is the largest settlement.

The county has an area of 3,798 km^{2} (1,466 sq mi) and had an estimated population of 786,231 in 2024. Ipswich is in the south of the county, and its other principal towns include Lowestoft in the north-east, Haverhill in the south-west, and Bury St Edmunds in the west. For local government purposes Suffolk is a non-metropolitan county with five districts.

The Suffolk coastline, which includes parts of the Suffolk & Essex Coast & Heaths National Landscape, is a complex habitat, formed by London Clay and crag underlain by chalk and therefore susceptible to erosion. It contains several deep estuaries, including those of the rivers Blyth, Deben, Orwell, Stour, and Alde/Ore; the latter is 25.5 km (15.8 mi) long and separated from the North Sea by Orford Ness, a large spit. Large parts of the coast are backed by heath and wetland habitats, such as Sandlings. The northeast of the county contains part of the Broads, a network of rivers and lakes which is a national park. Inland, the landscape is flat and gently undulating, and contains part of Thetford Forest on the Norfolk border and Dedham Vale National Landscape on the Essex border.

It is also known for its extensive farming and has largely arable land. Newmarket is known for horse racing, and Felixstowe is one of the largest container ports in Europe.

== History ==
Artefacts dating to around 70,000 years ago found at Pakefield and Beeches Pit are among the earliest evidence of human activity in northern Europe. In the Neolithic period and Bronze Age burial mounds, hillforts and causewayed enclosures were built reflecting Suffolk's role in prehistoric trade and agriculture.

At the start of the Roman period most of Suffolk was, along with Norfolk inhabited by the Iceni tribe. The Trinobantes inhabited parts of southern Suffolk, as well as Essex. The Iceni unsuccessfully revolted under Boudica in AD 60–61. Although Suffolk remained predominantly rural in the Roman period there were villas, small towns and pottery kilns. By the late 4th century, however, archaeological evidence suggests significant depopulation in parts of East Anglia possibly linked to coastal raiding. Anglian settlement followed in the 5th and 6th centuries with a distinctive Germanic material culture largely replacing a Romano-British one.

The area was mostly or entirely governed by the Kingdom of East Anglia, with studies of trade patterns and subinfeudation suggesting that the Stour Valley of what is now south-west Suffolk was part of the Kingdom of the East Saxons. Suffolk's most celebrated Anglo-Saxon site, Sutton Hoo was an elaborate royal ship burial – probably that of the East Anglian King Rædwald, whose son Sigeberht Christianised East Anglia.

In the medieval period Suffolk was shaped by successive waves of conquest. It became part of the Danelaw following Viking incursions. The county of Suffolk was formed in the 10th or 11th Century. Suffolk was reorganised under Norman feudalism after 1066, with castles at Framlingham, Clare, and Eye. The abbey at Bury St Edmunds became one of the wealthiest and most powerful religious institutions in medieval England. Later centuries saw Suffolk prosper from the cloth and wool trade, with towns such as Lavenham and Hadleigh flourishing in the 15th and 16th centuries. The county was also a site of Puritan and parliamentary strength during the English Civil War.

In modern times Suffolk's economy evolved with agriculture, fishing, and maritime trade, while the 19th century saw the development of industry at Ipswich and Lowestoft. Coastal erosion and the decline of traditional industries changed the county's fortunes, but its historic sites, churches, and coastal landscapes continue to shape its identity.

=== Archaeology ===
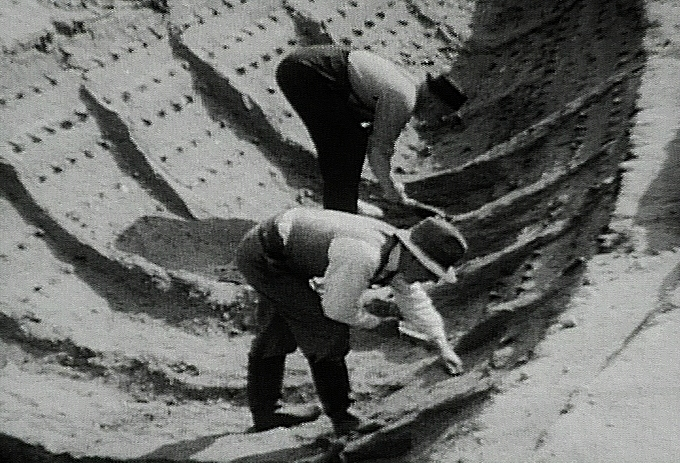
Excavation of the Sutton Hoo burial ship in 1939

A survey in 2020 named Suffolk the third best place in the UK for aspiring archaeologists, and showed that the area was especially rich in finds from the Roman period, with over 1500 objects found in the preceding year.

A formative episode in English archeology was in 1797 when John Frere found flint hand axes, now known to date back 400,000 years in the Hoxne Brick Pit, in a deposit twelve feet deep, and commented that "the situation in which these weapons were found may tempt us to refer them to a very remote period indeed; even beyond that of the present world". This is the earliest recognition that hand axes were made by early humans, and was over sixty years before the antiquity of humanity was widely appreciated. One of Frere's hand axes, which was probably a general cutting tool, is held in the British Museum. The site also provides the type deposits of the Hoxnian Stage, an interglacial between around 474,000 and 374,000 years ago, which is named after the site.

West Suffolk, like nearby East Cambridgeshire, is renowned for archaeological finds from the Stone Age, the Bronze Age, and the Iron Age. Bronze Age artefacts have been found in the area between Mildenhall and West Row, in Eriswell and in Lakenheath.

In the east of the county is Sutton Hoo, the site of one of England's most significant Anglo-Saxon archaeological finds, a ship burial containing a collection of treasures including a sword of state, helmet, gold and silver bowls, jewellery and a lyre.

The Hoxne Hoard, to date the largest assembly of late Roman silver and gold discovered in Britain, was found near the village of Hoxne in 1992.

While carrying out surveys before installing a pipeline in 2014, archaeologists for Anglian Water discovered nine skeletons and four cremation pits, at Bardwell, Barnham, Pakenham and Rougham, all near Bury St Edmunds. Neolithic, Bronze Age, Iron Age, Roman and Medieval items were also unearthed, along with the nine skeletons believed to be of the late or Post-Roman Britain. Experts said the five-month project had recovered enough artefacts to fill half a shipping container, and that the discoveries had shed new light on their understanding of the development of small rural communities.

In 2019 an excavation of a 4th-century Roman burial in Great Whelnetham uncovered unusual burial practices. Of 52 skeletons found, a large number had been decapitated, which archaeologists claimed gave new insight into Roman traditions. The burial ground includes the remains of men, women and children who likely lived in a nearby settlement. The fact that up to 40% of the bodies were decapitated represents "quite a rare find".

In July 2020, metal detectorist Luke Mahoney found 1,061 silver hammered coins, estimated to be worth £100,000, in Ipswich. The coins dated back to the 15th–17th century, according to experts.

In 2020, archaeologists discovered a 7th-century Anglo-Saxon cemetery with 17 cremations and 191 burials in Oulton, near Lowestoft. The graves contained the remains of men, women and children, as well as artefacts including small iron knives, silver pennies, wrist clasps, strings of amber and glass beads. According to Andrew Peachey, who carried out the excavations, the skeletons had mostly vanished because of the highly acidic soil. They were preserved as brittle shapes and "sand silhouettes".

== Governance ==
=== Local government ===
The coat of arms of Suffolk County Council

Since 1974, Suffolk has been a two-tier non-metropolitan county, meaning the provision of local government services is divided between a county council and district councils. The county has been divided into five districts since 2019: Babergh, East Suffolk, Ipswich, Mid Suffolk, and West Suffolk. Suffolk County Council is based in Ipswich.

In March 2026, the government announced local government reorganisation plans, which would have seen local government across Suffolk reorganised in 2028 into three unitary authorities. These proposals were withdrawn in September 2026.

==== History ====
Historically, Suffolk was divided into four for the purposes of the courts of quarter sessions, which met at Beccles, Bury St Edmunds, Ipswich and Woodbridge. In 1860, the Beccles, Ipswich and Woodbridge divisions were merged into an East Suffolk division, administered from Ipswich, and the Bury St Edmunds division became the West Suffolk division. Under the Local Government Act 1888, which established county councils, the two divisions formed the basis of the administrative counties of East Suffolk and West Suffolk.

On 1 April 1974, under the Local Government Act 1972, East Suffolk (with the exception of five parishes and parts of two more, which were transferred to Norfolk), the county borough of Ipswich, and West Suffolk were merged to form a single non-metropolitan county of Suffolk. The new county was originally divided into seven districts: Babergh, Forest Heath, Ipswich, Mid Suffolk, St Edmundsbury, Suffolk Coastal, and Waveney. In 2019, Forest Heath and St Edmundsbury were merged to form West Suffolk, and Waveney and Suffolk Coastal to form East Suffolk.

=== Parliamentary constituencies ===
Suffolk is divided into eight parliamentary constituencies: one borough constituency and seven county constituencies. Seven constituencies lie wholly within Suffolk, and Waveney Valley straddles the county border between Suffolk and Norfolk.

== Geography ==
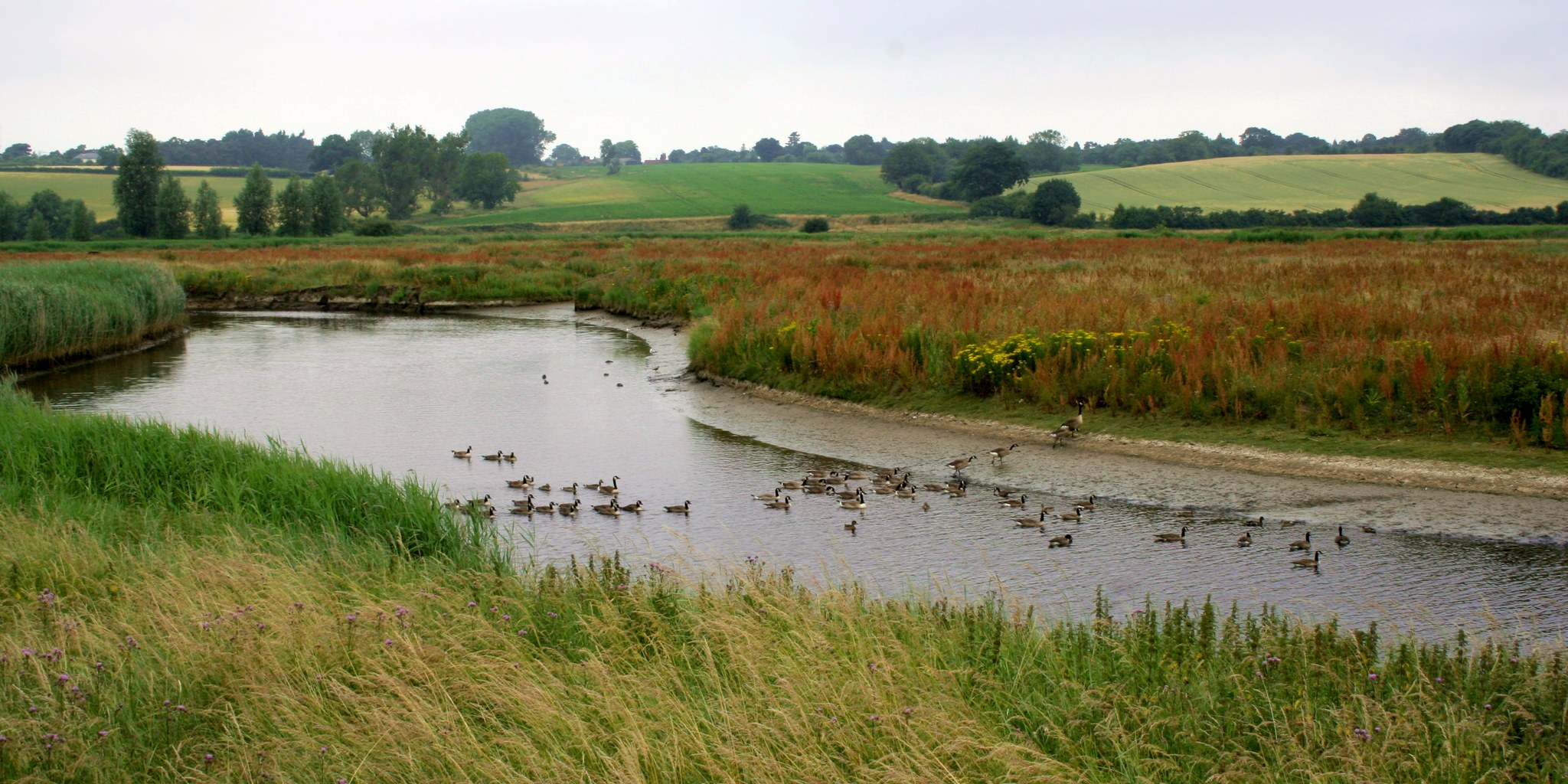
River Stour at Dedham Vale National Landscape

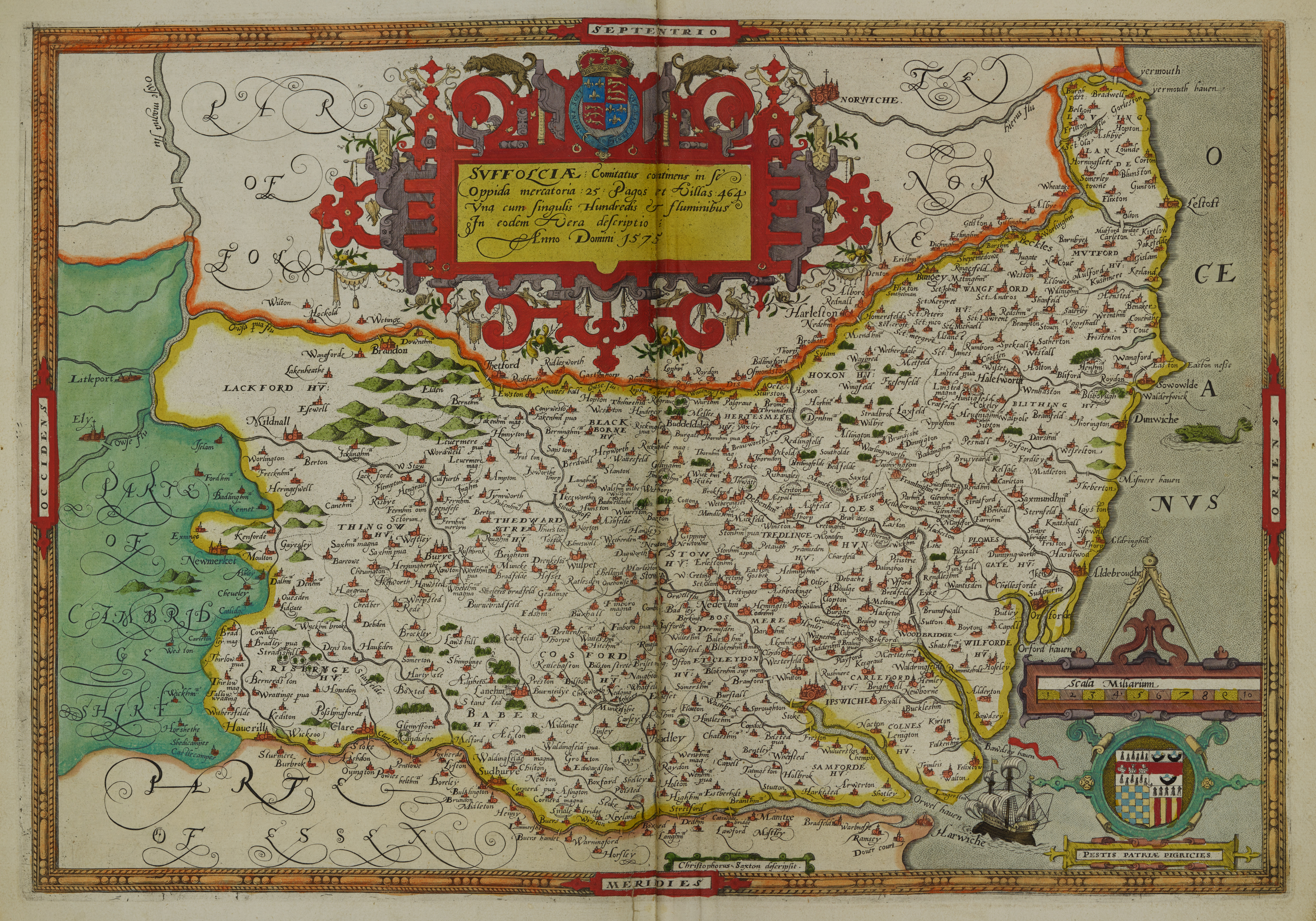
Hand-drawn map of Suffolk by Christopher Saxton from 1573

Suffolk is also home to nature reserves, such as the RSPB site at Minsmere, and Trimley Marshes, a wetland under the protection of Suffolk Wildlife Trust. The clay plateau inland, deeply intercut by rivers, is often referred to as 'High Suffolk'. The west of the county lies on more resistant Cretaceous chalk. This chalk is responsible for a sweeping tract of largely downland landscapes that stretches from Dorset in the south west to Dover in the south east and north through East Anglia to the Yorkshire Wolds. The chalk is less easily eroded so forms the only significant hills in the county. The highest point in the county is Great Wood Hill, with an elevation of 128 metres (420 ft). The county flower is the oxlip.

== Demography ==
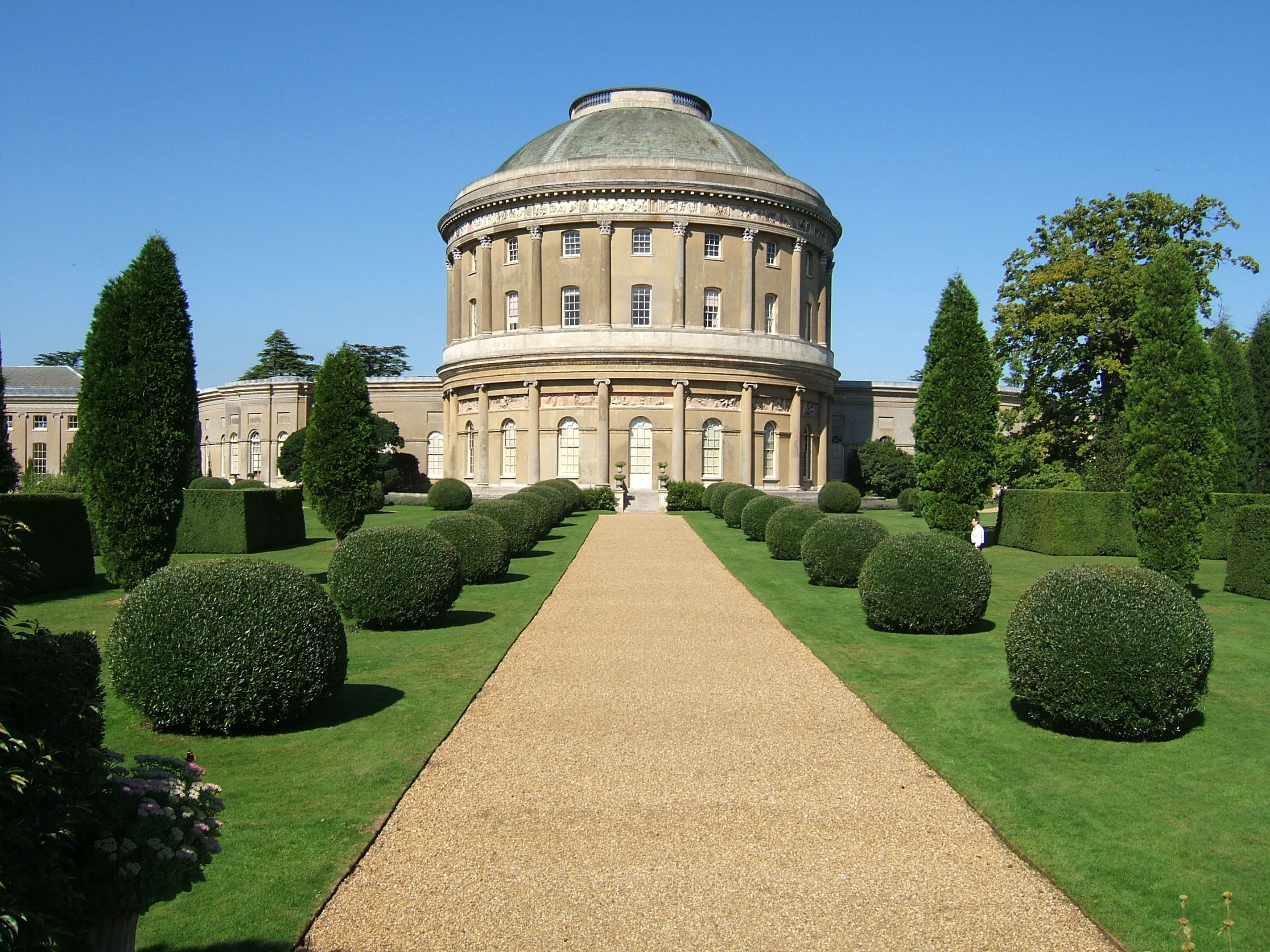
Ickworth House close to Bury St Edmunds

As of the 2021 census, the population of Suffolk was 760,688, split almost evenly between males and females. Roughly 22% of the population was aged 65 or older, and 93.1% were White British.

Historically, the county's population has mostly been employed as agricultural workers. An 1835 survey showed Suffolk to have 4,526 occupiers of land employing labourers, 1,121 occupiers not employing labourers, 33,040 labourers employed in agriculture, 676 employed in manufacture, 18,167 employed in retail trade or handicraft, 2,228 'capitalists, bankers etc.', 5,336 labourers (non-agricultural), 4,940 other males aged over 20, 2,032 male servants and 11,483 female servants.

A traditional nickname for people from Suffolk is "Suffolk Fair-Maids", referring to the supposed beauty of its female inhabitants in the Middle Ages. Another is "Silly Suffolk", often assumed to be derived from the Old English word sælig in the meaning "blessed", referring to the long history of Christianity in the county. However, use of the term "Silly Suffolk" can actually be dated to no earlier than 1819, and its alleged medieval origins have been shown to be mythical.

Rank	Town	Population (2024)	Borough/District council
1	Ipswich	152,481	Ipswich Borough Council
2	Lowestoft	71,992	East Suffolk Council
3	Bury St Edmunds	43,824	West Suffolk Council
4	Haverhill	28,502	West Suffolk Council
5	Felixstowe	24,951	East Suffolk Council
6	Stowmarket	22,704	Mid Suffolk Council

== Economy ==
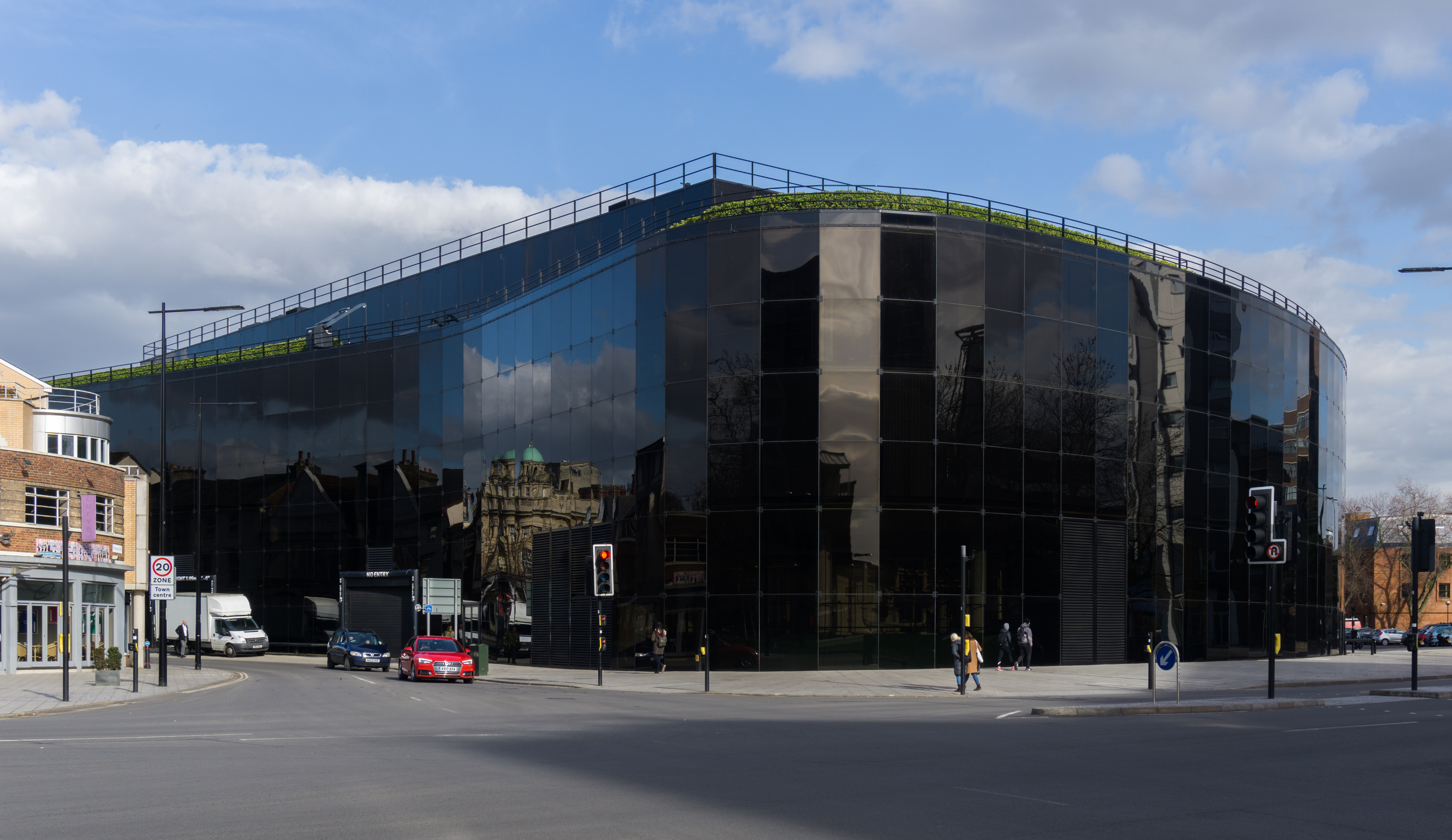
The Willis Building in Ipswich, a landmark office building in the town

The majority of agriculture in Suffolk is either agronomy or mixed farming. Farm sizes vary from anything around 80 acres (32 hectares) to over 8,000. Soil types vary from heavy clays to light sands. Crops grown include winter wheat, barley, sugar beet, oilseed rape, winter and spring beans and linseed, although smaller areas of rye and oats can be found growing in areas with lighter soils along with a variety of vegetables.

The continuing importance of agriculture in the county is reflected in the Suffolk Show, which is held annually in May at Ipswich. Although latterly somewhat changed in nature, this remains primarily an agricultural show.

Companies based in Suffolk include Greene King Brewery and Branston Pickle in Bury St Edmunds. Birds Eye has its largest UK factory in Lowestoft, where all its meat products and frozen vegetables are processed. Huntley & Palmers biscuit company has a base in Sudbury. The UK horse racing industry is based in Newmarket. There are two United States Air Force bases in the west of the county at RAF Lakenheath and RAF Mildenhall. Sizewell B nuclear power station is at Sizewell on the coast near Leiston. Bernard Matthews Farms have some processing units in the county, specifically Holton. Southwold is the home of Adnams Brewery. The Port of Felixstowe is the largest container port in the United Kingdom. Other ports include Port of Lowestoft and Port of Ipswich, run by Associated British Ports. BT Group plc has its main research and development facility at Martlesham Heath.

Regional gross value added of Suffolk at basic prices with figures in millions of British Pounds Sterling.
Year	Regional gross value added (Note: Components may not sum to totals due to rounding)	Agriculture (Note: includes hunting and forestry)	Industry (Note: includes energy and construction)	Services (Note: includes financial intermediation services indirectly measured)
1995	7,113	391	2,449	4,273
2000	8,096	259	2,589	5,248
2003	9,456	270	2,602	6,583

== Education ==
=== Primary, secondary and further education ===
Suffolk has a comprehensive education system with fourteen independent schools. Unusually for the UK, some of Suffolk had a 3-tier school system in place with primary schools (ages 4–9), middle schools (ages 9–13) and upper schools (ages 13–16). However, a 2006 Suffolk County Council study concluded that Suffolk should move to the two-tier school system used in the majority of the UK. For the purpose of conversion to two-tier, the three-tier system was divided into four geographical area groupings and corresponding phases. The first phase was the conversion of schools in Lowestoft and Haverhill in 2011, followed by schools in north and west Suffolk in 2012. The remainder of the changeovers to two-tier took place from 2013, for those schools that stayed within local government control, and did not become Academies and/or free schools. The majority of schools thus now (2019) operate the more common primary to high school (11–16).

Many of the county's upper schools have a sixth form and most further education colleges in the county offer A-level courses. In terms of school population, Suffolk's individual schools are large with the Ipswich district with the largest school population and Forest Heath the smallest, with just two schools. In 2013, a letter said that "...nearly a fifth of the schools inspected were judged inadequate. This is unacceptable and now means that Suffolk has a higher proportion of pupils educated in inadequate schools than both the regional and national averages."

The Royal Hospital School near Ipswich is the largest independent boarding school in Suffolk. Other boarding schools within Suffolk include Barnardiston Hall Preparatory School, Culford School, Finborough School, Framlingham College, Ipswich High School, Ipswich School, Orwell Park School, Saint Felix School and Woodbridge School.

The Castle Partnership Academy Trust in Haverhill is the county's only All-through Academy Chain. Comprising Castle Manor Academy and Place Farm Primary Academy, the Academy Trust supports all-through education and provides opportunities for young people aged 3 to 18.

Sixth form colleges in the county include Lowestoft Sixth Form College and One in Ipswich. Suffolk is home to considerably more education colleges, which include: Lowestoft College, Easton & Otley College, Suffolk New College and Northgate Sixth Form (Ipswich), Abbeygate Sixth Form, Thurston Community College (Beyton Campus) and West Suffolk College (Bury St Edmunds).

=== Tertiary education ===
The county has one university, the University of Suffolk, which became an independent institution with degree awarding powers and university status in 2016. The university operates at five sites, with its central hub in Ipswich. Others include Lowestoft, Bury St. Edmunds, and Great Yarmouth in Norfolk. The university is organised in four academic schools and in 2024/25 had 13,590 students. 88% of the student body are aged over 21 and 46% of the university's students are male.

== Culture ==
=== Arts ===
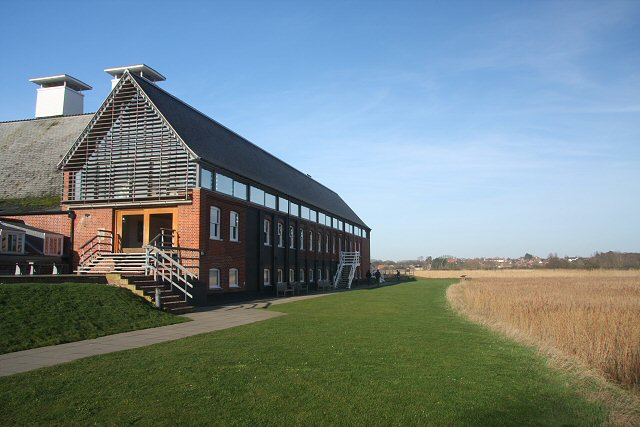
Snape Maltings Concert Hall; formerly a Victorian maltings, now converted into a world-famous concert venue

Founded in 1948 by Benjamin Britten, the annual Aldeburgh Festival is one of the UK's major classical music festivals. Originating in Aldeburgh, it has been held at the nearby Snape Maltings since 1967. Since 2006, Henham Park, has been home to the annual Latitude Festival. This mainly open-air festival, which has grown considerably in size and scope, includes popular music, comedy, poetry and literary events.

The FolkEast festival is held at Glemham Hall in August and attracts international acoustic, folk and roots musicians whilst also championing local businesses, heritage and crafts. In 2015 it was also home to the first instrumental festival of musical instruments and makers. More recently, LeeStock Music Festival has been held in Sudbury. A celebration of the county, "Suffolk Day", was instigated in 2017.

=== Dialect ===
The Suffolk dialect is very distinctive. Epenthesis and yod-dropping is common, along with non-conjugation of verbs.

=== Sport ===
==== Football ====
The county's sole professional football club is Ipswich Town. Formed in 1878, the club were Football League First Division champions in 1961–62, FA Cup winners in 1977–78 and UEFA Cup winners in 1980–81; as of the 2025–26 season, Ipswich Town play in the Championship, the second tier of English football. The club has as part of its crest the Suffolk Punch, a now endangered breed of draught horse native to the county. The next highest ranked teams in Suffolk are AFC Sudbury, Bury Town, Leiston and Needham Market, who all participate in the Southern League Premier Division Central, the seventh tier of English football.

==== Horse racing ====
Newmarket is the headquarters of British horseracing – home to the largest cluster of training yards in the country and many key horse racing organisations including the National Stud, and Newmarket Racecourse. Tattersalls bloodstock auctioneers and the National Horseracing Museum are also in the town. Point to point racing takes place at Higham and Ampton.

==== Speedway ====
Motorcycle speedway racing has been staged in Suffolk since at least the 1950s, following the construction of the Foxhall Stadium, just outside Ipswich, home of the Ipswich Witches. The Witches are currently members of the Premier League, the UK's first division. National League team Mildenhall Fen Tigers are also from Suffolk.

==== Cricket ====
Suffolk County Cricket Club compete in the Eastern Division of the Minor Counties Championship. The club has won the championship three times outright and has shared the title one other time as well as winning the MCCA Knockout Trophy once. Home games are played in Bury St Edmunds, Copdock, Exning, Framlingham, Ipswich and Mildenhall.

=== Flag ===
Flag of Suffolk

The Suffolk flag is a banner of arms of the coat of arms which were attributed to Edmund the Martyr, a medieval king of East Anglia. It consists of two gold arrows passing through a gold crown or with heraldic description as Azure two Arrows in saltire, points downward, enfiled with an ancient Crown Or.

=== Suffolk Day ===
Suffolk Day is an annual celebration of the county that takes place annually on June 21.

=== Suffolk Pink ===
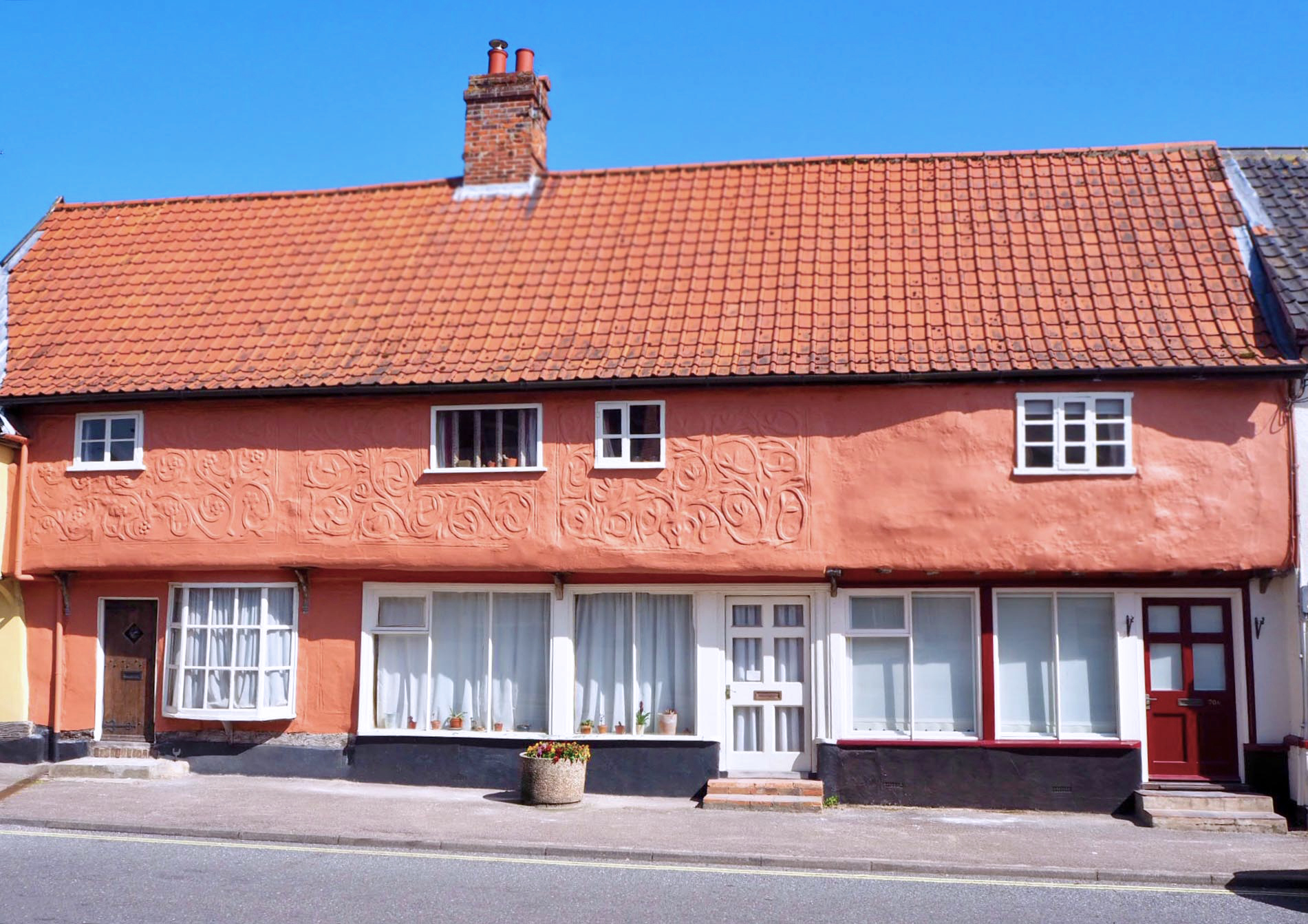
16th century cottage in Ixworth, with pargetting and Suffolk Pink limewash

The exteriors of historic Suffolk buildings are often coloured pink, and "Suffolk Pink" has become associated with the county.

There is little evidence that the county's buildings were coloured externally before the eighteenth century, with white or off-white predominating. Clapboarded buildings and barns were sometimes painted red, but a St Edmundsbury Borough Council conservation leaflet notes that "if there is such a thing as a traditional, external Suffolk colour it is lime white, which is a soft, translucent off-white."

By the late nineteenth century, red and yellow ochre were added to limewash to produce pink and pale yellow respectively; a popular myth that pink was achieved by adding pig blood, ox blood, sloes, or damsons to limewash is probably apocryphal. The popularisation of the colour may have occurred in the twentieth century as a result of commercial marketing. It is not mentioned in the 1960 Shell Guide to Suffolk or the 1961 edition of The Buildings of England covering the county, but is mentioned in the 1974 edition of the latter.

== Suffolk in popular culture ==
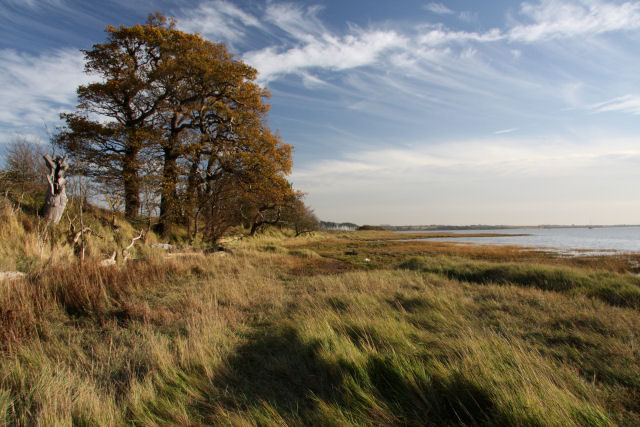
Bank of the River Orwell

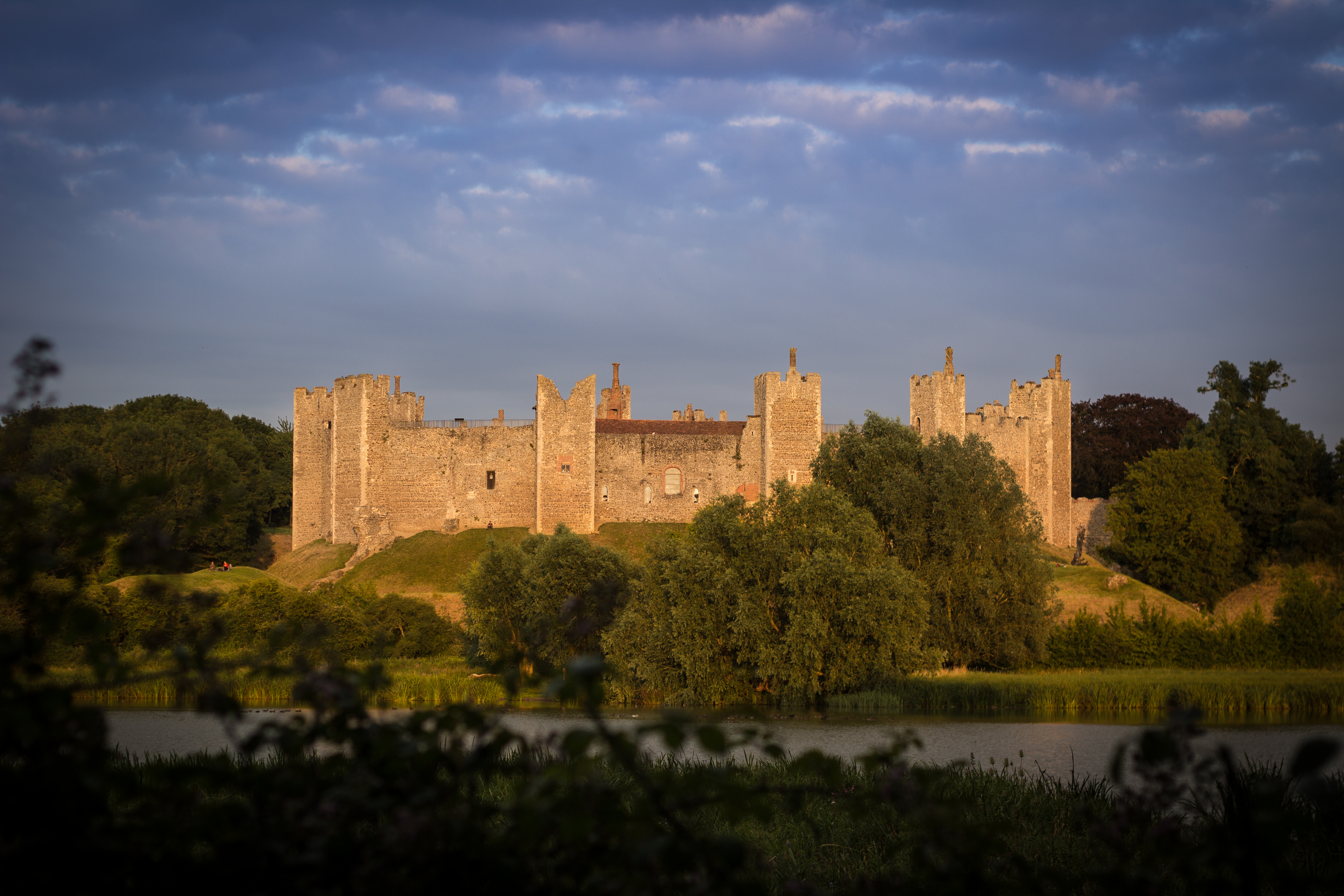
Framlingham Castle, the setting which inspired Ed Sheeran's "Castle on the Hill" song

Novels set in Suffolk include parts of David Copperfield by Charles Dickens, The Fourth Protocol, by Frederick Forsyth, Unnatural Causes by P.D. James, Dodie Smith's The Hundred and One Dalmatians, The Rings of Saturn by W. G. Sebald, and among Arthur Ransome's children's books, We Didn't Mean to Go to Sea, Coot Club and Secret Water take place in part in the county. Roald Dahl's short story "The Mildenhall Treasure" is set in Mildenhall.

A TV series about a British antiques dealer, Lovejoy, was filmed in various locations in Suffolk. The reality TV series Space Cadets was filmed in Rendlesham Forest, although the producers fooled participants into believing that they were in Russia. Several towns and villages in the county have been used for location filming of other television programmes and cinema films. These include the BBC Four TV series Detectorists, an episode of Kavanagh QC, and the films Iris and Drowning by Numbers. During the period 2017–2018, a total of £3.8million was spent by film crews in Suffolk.

The Rendlesham Forest Incident is one of the most famous UFO events in England and is sometimes referred to as "Britain's Roswell".

The song "Castle on the Hill" by Ed Sheeran was referred to by him as "a love letter to Suffolk", with lyrical references to his hometown of Framlingham and Framlingham Castle.

Knype Hill is the fictional name for Southwold in George Orwell's 1935 novel A Clergyman's Daughter, while the character of Dorothy Hare is modelled on Brenda Salkeld, the gym mistress at St Felix School in the early 1930s.

Richard Curtis and Danny Boyle's 2019 romantic comedy Yesterday was filmed throughout Suffolk, using Halesworth, Dunwich, Shingle Street and Latitude Festival as locations. The television series of Anthony Horowitz's Magpie murders was filmed extensively in Suffolk during 2021.

The 2021 film The Dig, based on the excavation of Sutton Hoo in the 1930s and starring Ralph Fiennes and Carey Mulligan was mostly shot on location.

The 2022 series The Witchfinder is a BBC Two sitcom based on the journey of Matthew Hopkins, the Witchfinder general, and a suspected witch through East Anglia and many Suffolk towns including Stowmarket and Framlingham during the witch trials of the English Civil War.

== Media ==
The county is covered by the BBC East and ITV Anglia television regions.The BBC local radio station for the county is BBC Radio Suffolk, broadcast from its studios in Ipswich. Local commercial radio stations serving the county include Heart East, Nation Radio Suffolk, Greatest Hits Radio East and Star Radio (only covering Haverhill). Community radio stations include RWSfm 103.3 in Bury St Edmunds; Ipswich Community Radio; Zack FM in Mildenhall; Park Radio in Diss and Eye; and Felixstowe Radio.

Local newspapers include the Suffolk Chronicle, East Anglian Daily Times and Eastern Daily Press.

== Notable people ==
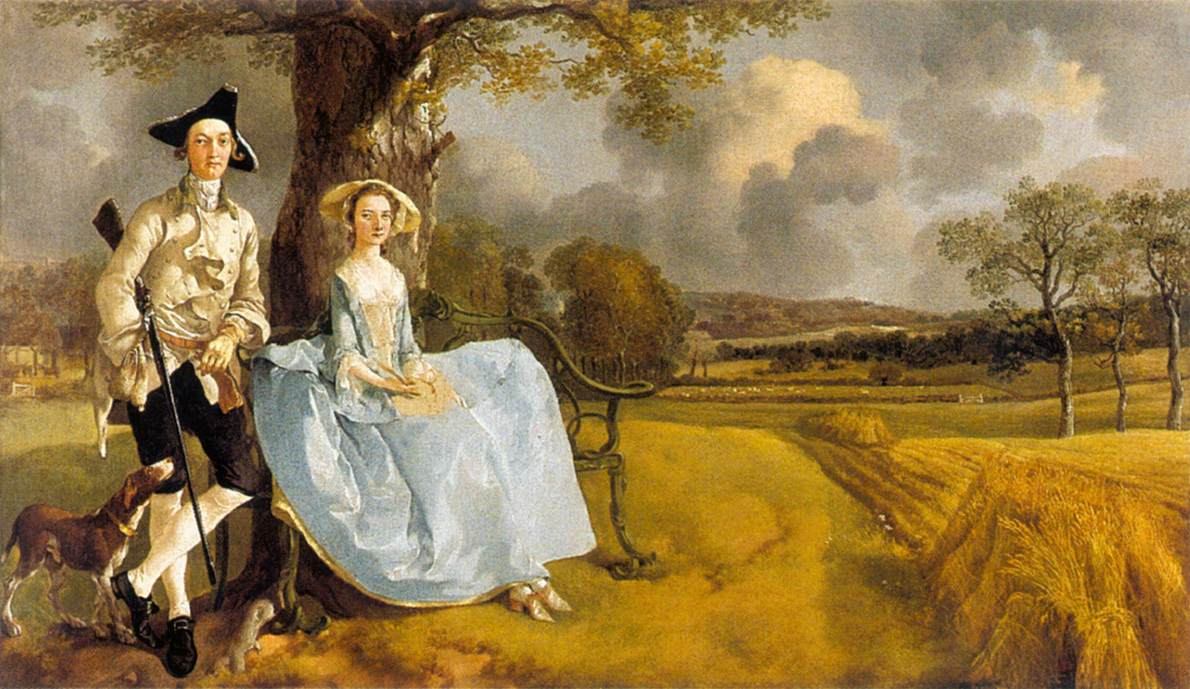
Gainsborough's Mr and Mrs Andrews (1748–49), housed at the National Gallery in London, depicts the Suffolk landscape of his time.

In the arts, Suffolk is noted for having been home to two of England's best regarded painters, Thomas Gainsborough and John Constable – the Stour Valley area is branded as "Constable Country" – and one of its most noted composers, Benjamin Britten. Other artistic figures connected with Suffolk include: Sir Alfred Munnings, John Nash, sculptor Dame Elizabeth Frink, Cedric Morris who ran the East Anglian School, Philip Wilson Steer, and the cartoonist Carl Giles (a bronze statue of his character "Grandma" is located in Ipswich town centre); the poets George Crabbe and Robert Bloomfield were both born in Suffolk; as was folklorist Margaret Helen James; farmer and writer Adrian Bell, writer and literary editor Ronald Blythe, V. S. Pritchett, the authors Ralph Hammond Innes and Ruth Rendell all lived in the county.

The writer M. M. Kaye spent her last years in Suffolk and died in Lavenham. Actors Ralph Fiennes, Bob Hoskins and Sam Claflin, actress and singer Kerry Ellis, American film and television actress Rebecca De Mornay, musician and record producer Brian Eno, multi-award-winning singer-songwriter Ed Sheeran, bassist in the band Keane Jesse Quin and sopranos Laura Wright and Christina Johnston are all connected with the county. Glam rock band and three time Brit Award winners the Darkness hail from Lowestoft.

Hip hop DJ Tim Westwood is originally from Suffolk and the influential DJ and radio presenter John Peel made the county his home. Contemporary painter Maggi Hambling, was born and resides in Suffolk. Norah Lofts, author of best-selling historical novels, lived for decades in Bury St. Edmunds. Sir Peter Hall the founder of the Royal Shakespeare Company was born in Bury St. Edmunds, and Sir Trevor Nunn the theatre director was born in Ipswich. The actor Sir John Mills spent periods of his youth in the county. The designer David Hicks lived for a number of years in Suffolk. Model Claudia Schiffer and her husband, the film director Matthew Vaughn, have owned a house in Suffolk since 2002.

Suffolk's contributions to sport include former Formula One magnate Bernie Ecclestone and former England national team footballers Terry Butcher, Kieron Dyer and Matthew Upson. Due to Newmarket being the centre of British horse racing many jockeys have settled in the county, including Lester Piggott and Frankie Dettori. MMA fighter Arnold Allen was born in Suffolk. British heavyweight boxing champion Fabio Wardley is also from Suffolk.

Significant ecclesiastical figures from Suffolk include Simon Sudbury, a former archbishop of Canterbury; former Lord Chancellor Thomas Wolsey hailed from Ipswich; and author, poet and Benedictine monk John Lydgate. Richard Hakluyt the great recorder of exploration and voyages was a clergyman in Wetheringsett. Edward FitzGerald, the first translator of the Rubaiyat of Omar Khayyam, was born in Bredfield. The abolitionists Thomas Clarkson and Richard Dykes Alexander both lived near Ipswich. The agriculturist Arthur Young had a long-standing association with the county.

Other significant persons from Suffolk include the great landscape designer Humphry Repton, suffragette Dame Millicent Garrett Fawcett; the captain of HMS Beagle, Robert FitzRoy; Witch-finder General Matthew Hopkins; educationist Hugh Catchpole; and Britain's first female physician and mayor, Elizabeth Garrett Anderson. The tuberculosis treatment pioneer Jane Walker ran the East Anglian Sanatorium above the banks of the River Stour, and charity leader Sue Ryder settled in Suffolk and based her charity in Cavendish.

The popular Victorian novelist Henry Seton Merriman lived and died in the village of Melton. Between 1932 and 1939 George Orwell lived at his parents' home in the coastal town of Southwold, where a mural of the author now dominates the entrance to Southwold Pier. He is said to have chosen his pen name from Suffolk's River Orwell. Arthur Ransome lived alongside the river during the 1930s, sailing his boats from Pin Mill and along the Shotley Peninsula. The county was also home to wild swimmer and environmentalist Roger Deakin. The Welshman George Ewart Evans settled in Suffolk and did much to record the traditional rural ways of East Anglian life. Flora Sandes, officially the only British woman to serve in a military capacity during the First World War died in Suffolk in 1956.

== Edmund of East Anglia ==
King of East Anglia and Christian martyr St Edmund, after whom the town of Bury St Edmunds is named, was killed by invading Danes in the year 869. St Edmund was the patron saint of England until he was replaced by St George in the 13th century. The year 2006 saw the failure of a campaign to have St Edmund named the patron saint of England. In 2007 he was named the patron saint of Suffolk, with St Edmund's Day falling on 20 November. His flag is flown in Suffolk on that day.

== See also ==
- List of places of interest in Suffolk
- List of English and Welsh endowed schools (19th century)#Suffolk
- History of Suffolk
- Healthcare in Suffolk
- Suffolk (UK Parliament constituency)
- Suffolk Police and Crime Commissioner
- Suffolk Coast and Heaths
- List of Lords Lieutenant of Suffolk
- List of High Sheriffs of Suffolk
- Suffolk Youth Orchestra
