= Gipping Rural District =

Former local government area in the UK

Coordinates: 52.14°N 0.97°E

Gipping
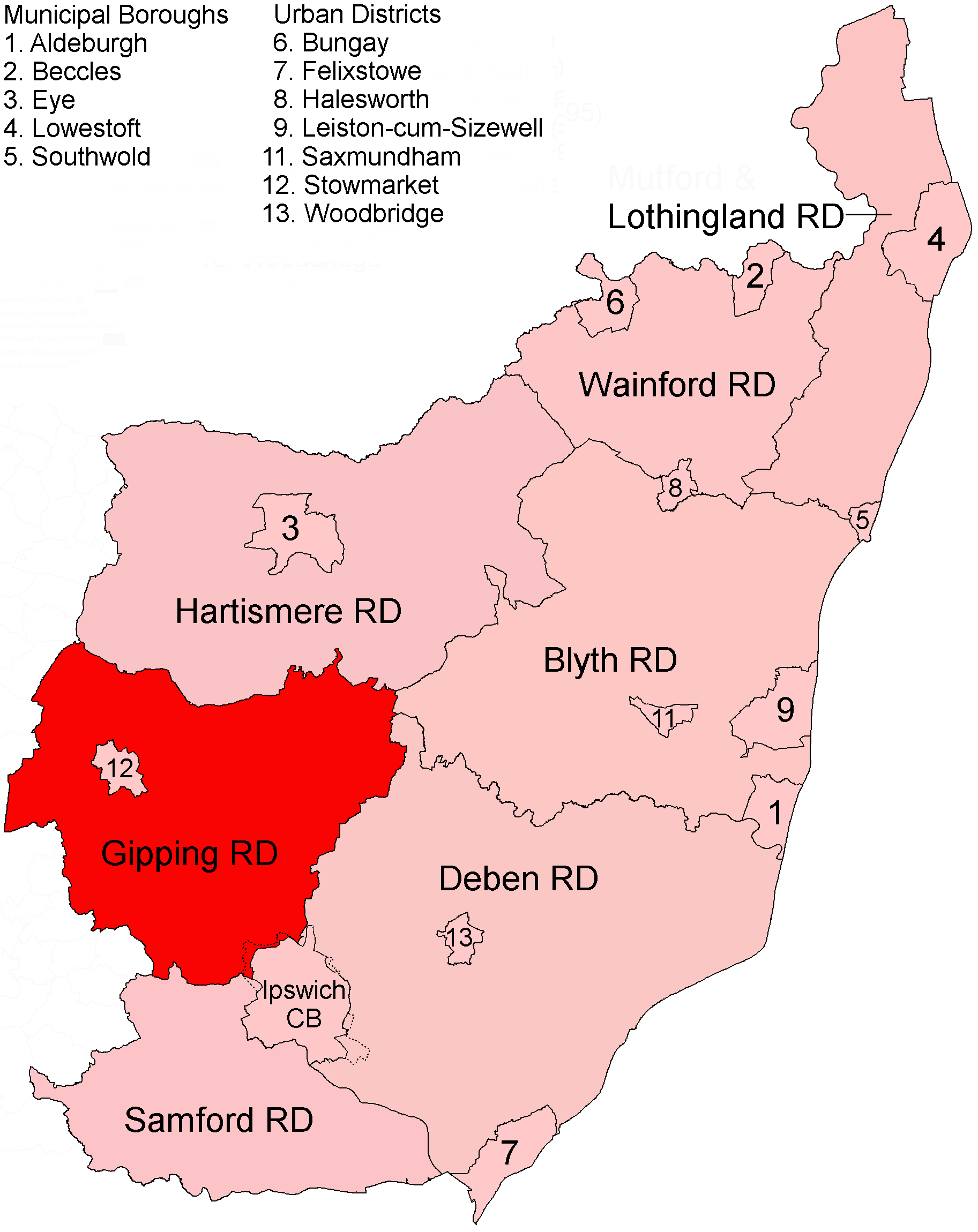
- Location within East Suffolk, 1934
- History
  - Created: 1934
  - Abolished: 1974
  - Succeeded by: Mid Suffolk District
- Status: Rural district
  - HQ: Needham Market

Gipping Rural District was a rural district in the county of East Suffolk, England. It was created in 1934 by the merger of the disbanded Bosmere and Claydon Rural District and the disbanded East Stow Rural District, under a County Review Order. It was named after the River Gipping and administered from Needham Market.

Its area was reduced slightly in 1952 by an expansion of the county borough of Ipswich.

On 1 April 1974 it was abolished under the Local Government Act 1972, and has since formed part of the District of Mid Suffolk.

== Statistics ==
Year	Area		Population	Density (pop/ha)
Year	acres	ha	Population	Density (pop/ha)
1951	78,913	31,935	20,515	0.64
1961	78,464	31,754	19,314	0.61

== Parishes ==
At the time of its dissolution it consisted of the following 49 civil parishes.

- Akenham
- Ashbocking
- Ashfield cum Thorpe
- Badley
- Barnham
- Barking
- Battisford
- Baylham
- Blakenham Magna
- Blakenham Parva
- Bramford
- Bricett Magna
- Buxhall
- Claydon
- Coddenham
- Combs
- Creeting St Mary
- Creeting St Peter
- Crowfield
- Debenham
- Finborough Magna
- Finborough Parva
- Flowton
- Framsden
- Gipping
- Gosbeck
- Harleston
- Haughley
- Helmingham
- Hemingstone
- Henley
- Mickfield
- Needham Market
- Nettlestead
- Offton
- Old Newton
- Onehouse
- Pettaugh
- Ringshall
- Shelland
- Somersham
- Stonham Aspal
- Stonham Earl
- Stonham Parva
- Stowupland
- Wetherden
- Whitton
- Willisham
- Winston

== Premises ==
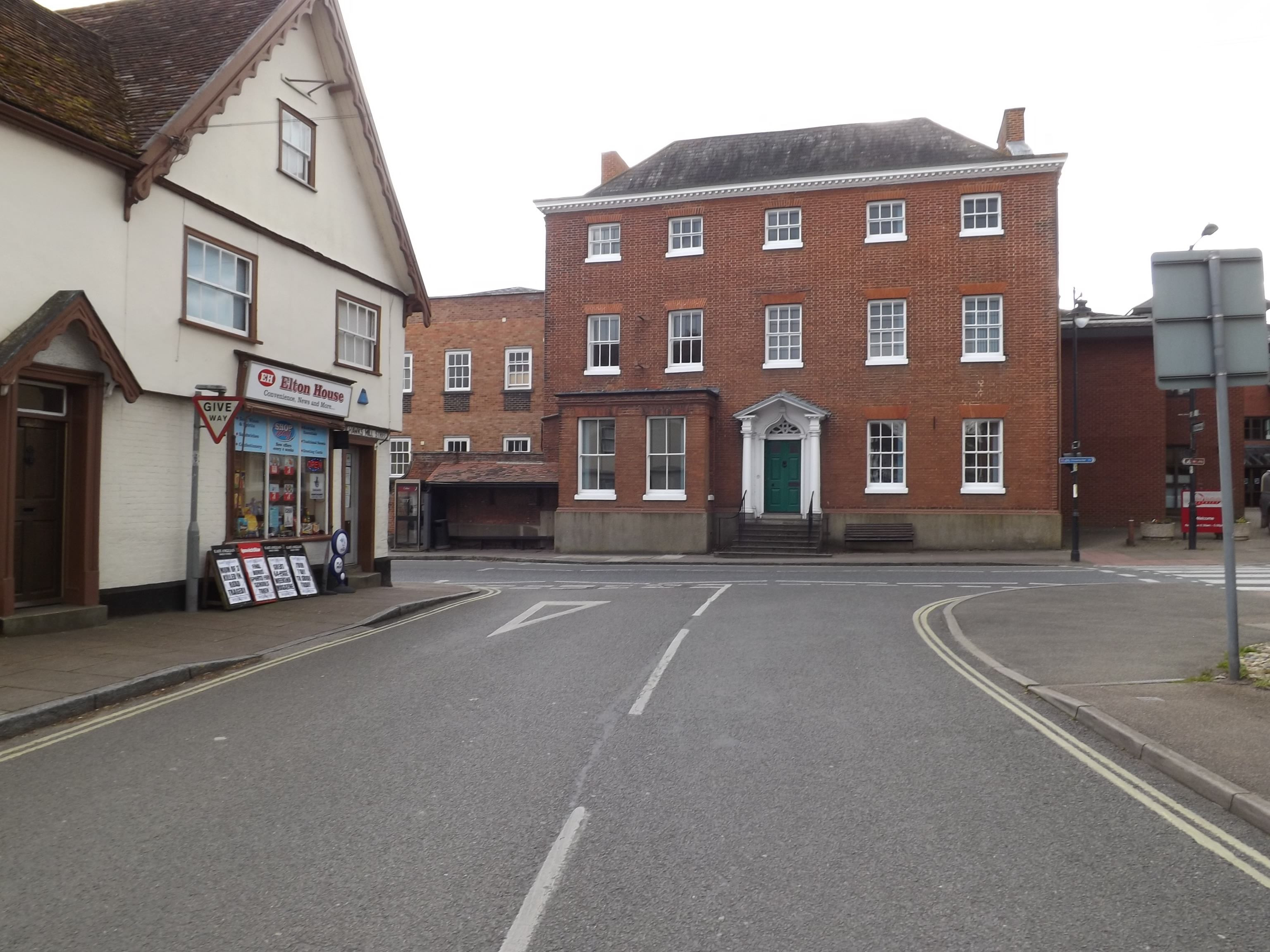
Council Offices, 131 High Street, Needham Market

The council established its headquarters at a large eighteenth century house called "Hurstlea" at 131 High Street in Needham Market. After the council's abolition in 1974 the building passed to the new Mid Suffolk District Council, who built a large extension to the rear which opened in 1982 to serve as its main offices.
