= East Stow Rural District =

Former local government area in the UK

Coordinates: 52.19°N 0.96°E

East Stow
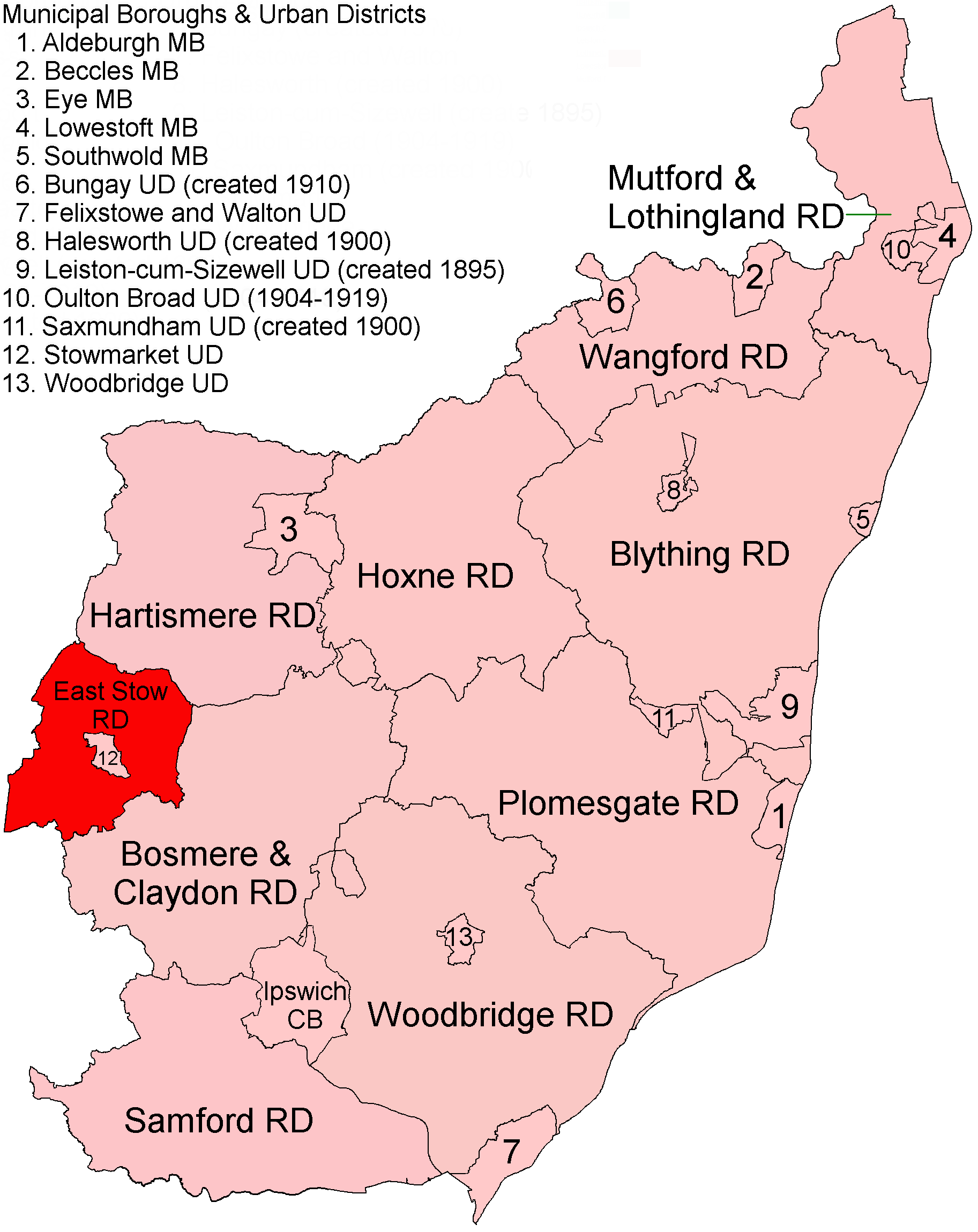
- Location within East Suffolk, 1894
- History
  - Created: 1894
  - Abolished: 1934
  - Succeeded by: Gipping Rural District
- Status: Rural district

East Stow was a rural district in East Suffolk, England from 1894 to 1934.

It was created under the Local Government Act 1894, from the part of the Stow rural sanitary district that was in East Suffolk (the rest forming Thedwastre Rural District in West Suffolk.) Its name derives from the historic hundred of Stow, whose boundaries it closely matched.

It was abolished in 1934 under a County Review Order. Its area went to form part of Gipping Rural District, with a small part being transferred to Stowmarket urban district. In 1974 the area became part of Mid Suffolk district.

== Statistics ==
Year	Area		Population	Density (pop/ha)
Year	acres	ha	Population	Density (pop/ha)
1911	21,647	8,760	6,223	0.71
1921	21,647	8,760	6,330	0.72
1931	21,647	8,760	7,236	0.83

== Parishes ==
East Stow RD contained the parishes of Buxhall, Combs, Creeting St Peter, Gipping, Great Finborough, Harleston, Haughley, Little Finborough, Old Newton, Onehouse, Shelland, Stowupland and Wetherden.
