= Bosmere and Claydon Rural District =

Former local government district in Suffolk, United Kingdom

Coordinates: 52.14°N 1.11°E

Bosmere and Claydon
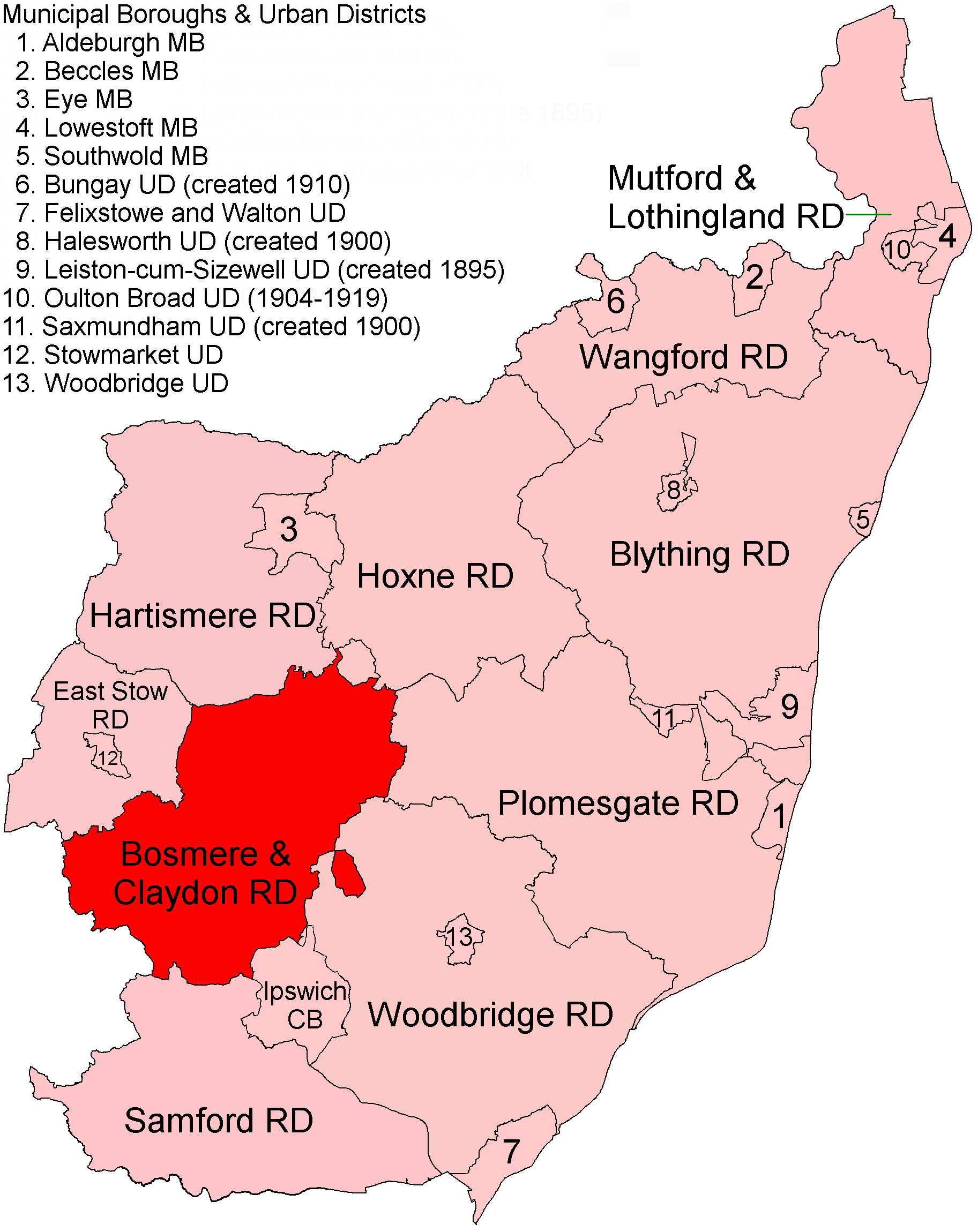
- Location within East Suffolk, 1894
- History
  - Created: 1894
  - Abolished: 1934
  - Succeeded by: Gipping Rural District
- Status: Rural district

Bosmere and Claydon Rural District was a rural district within the administrative county of East Suffolk between 1894 and 1934. It was created out of the earlier Bosmere and Claydon rural sanitary district. It was named after the historic hundred of Bosmere and Claydon, although the rural district covered a significantly larger area than the hundred.

In 1934, under a County Review Order, Bosmere and Claydon Rural District was abolished. Apart from the detached Swilland parish (to Deben Rural District) it became part of the new Gipping Rural District, and in 1974 became part of Mid Suffolk district.

== Statistics ==
Year	Area		Population	Density (pop/ha)
Year	acres	ha	Population	Density (pop/ha)
1911	58,881	23,829	14,070	0.59
1921	58,881	23,829	13,776	0.58
1931	58,881	23,829	14,612	0.61

== Parishes ==
Bosmere and Claydon RD contained the parishes of Akenham, Ashbocking, Ashfield cum Thorpe, Badley, Barham, Barking, Battisford, Baylham, Bramford, Claydon, Coddenham, Creeting St Mary, Crowfield, Debenham, Flowton, Framsden, Gosbeck, Great Blakenham, Great Bricett, Helmingham, Hemingstone, Henley, Little Blakenham, Mickfield, Needham Market (created 1907), Nettlestead, Offton, Pettaugh, Ringshall, Somersham, Stonham Aspal, Stonham Earl, Stonham Parva, Swilland, Whitton, Willisham and Winston.
