= Stow Hundred =

Former administrative division of Suffolk, England

Coordinates: 52.2°N 1.0°E

Stow was a hundred of Suffolk, consisting of 22,710 acres (91.9 km^{2}).

Stow Hundred a fertile and picturesque district in central Suffolk around seven miles (11 km) in length and breadth. It is bounded by Cosford, Bosmere and Claydon, Thedwestry, Blackbourn and Hartismere Hundreds. It is in the Deanery to which it gives name and was in the Archdeaconry of Sudbury until 1837 when it was added to the Archdeaconry of Suffolk, and is thus still in the Diocese of Norwich. It is watered by the River Gipping.

The word "stow" means place, as in "stow away", and the name of the hundred was probably derived from an old name for Stowmarket, the hundred's largest town.

== Parishes ==
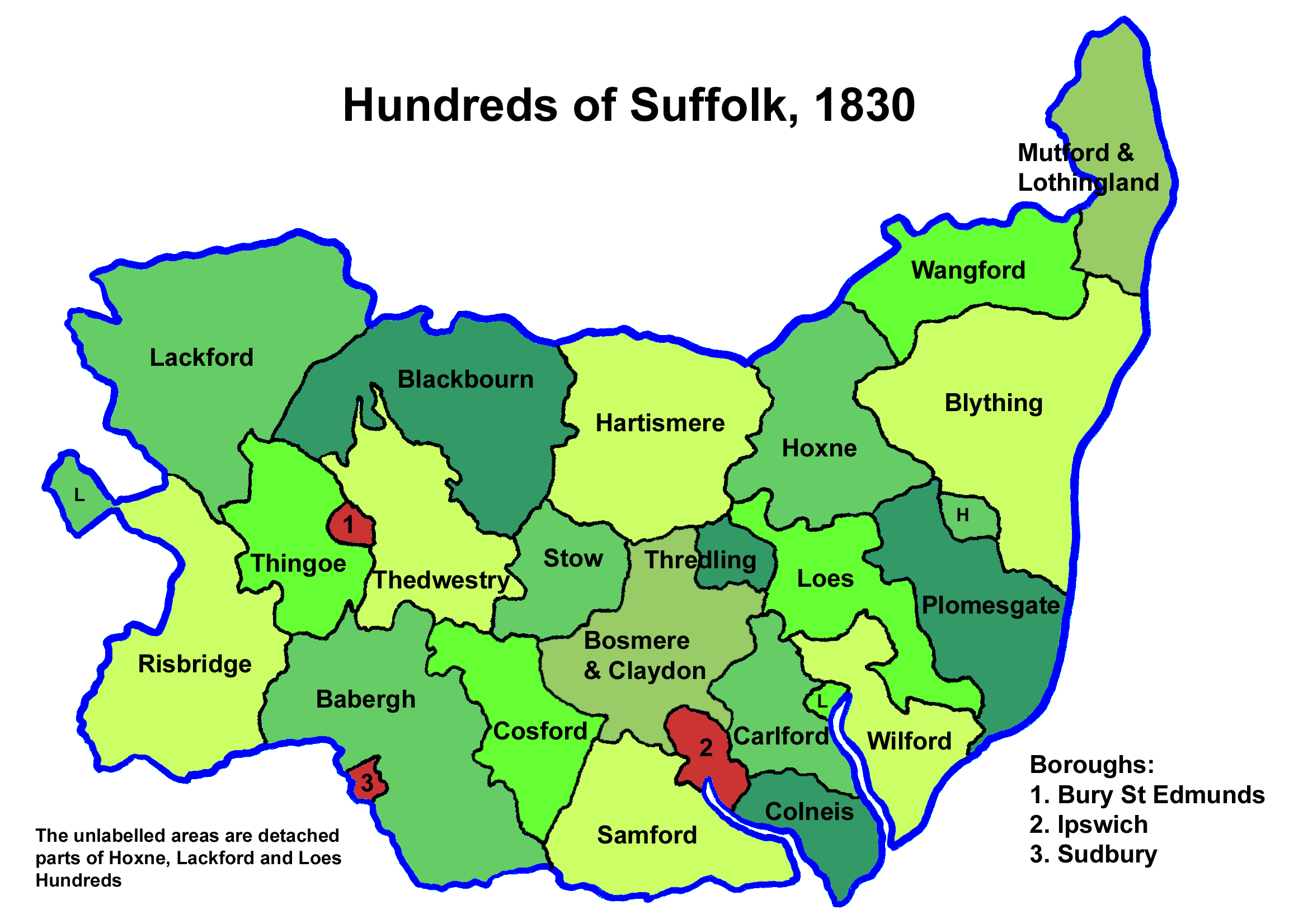
Suffolk hundreds

Stow Hundred consisted of the following 14 parishes:

Parish	Area (acres)
Buxhall	2524
Combs	3000
Creeting St Peter	1336
Gipping	900
Great Finborough	1632
Harleston	620
Haughley	2700
Little Finborough	360
Old Newton	2349
Onehouse	866
Shelland	509
Stowmarket	1240
Stowupland	2890
Wetherden	1784
