= Dagworth =

Dagworth may refer to:

- Dagworth, Suffolk, a hamlet in Old Newton with Dagworth civil parish in Suffolk, England
- Dagworth Station, a cattle station in Queensland, Australia
- Thomas Dagworth (1276—1352), an English knight and soldier
