= Stow Lodge =

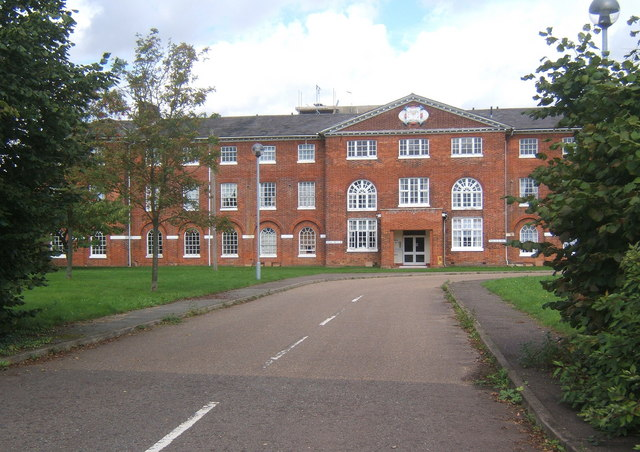
- View of the main entrance from the south.
- Interactive map of the Stow Lodge area

General information
- Type: Workhouse
- Location: Onehouse, Stowmarket, England
- Coordinates: 52.1926°N 0.9735°E

Design and construction
- Architect: Thos. Fulcher

Stow Lodge is a listed building in the parish of Onehouse in Stowmarket, Suffolk. Constructed in 1781 as Union Work House, a House of Industry for the 14 parishes of the Stow Hundred, it was subsequently used as a hospital and is now residential flats.

== History ==
The establishment of Houses of Industry, commonly known as workhouses, was enabled by the Workhouse Test Act 1722 to offer indoor relief to the poor. Stow Incorporation was established by the Stow, Suffolk (Poor Relief) Act 1778 (18 Geo. 3. c. 35) and was formed of the parishes of Buxhall, Combs, Creeting St. Peter, Great Finborough, Little Finborough, Harleston, Haughley, Old Newton, Onehouse, Shelland, Stow Upland, Stowmarket, and Wetherden.

Plans were approved for the construction of Union Workhouse in 1779 and it was completed in 1781 at a cost of £1,200. According to White's Directory for Suffolk of 1844 it was described in 1810 as having "more the appearance of a gentleman's seat than a receptacle for paupers".

Inmates who died whilst in the workhouse were buried in the paupers graveyard nearby, which was purchased by Onehouse Parish Council in 2000 and is maintained by volunteers.

The lodge later became Stow Lodge Hospital until its closure in 1991. The hospital was scheduled as a building of architectural and historical interest in 1956 and listed as Grade II in 1988. It was later converted to residential use.
