= Fenn Street =

Fenn Street may refer to:

Placenames

- Fenn Street, Kent, England
- Fenn Street, Suffolk, England

Fictional

- location of British TV sitcoms, Please Sir! and The Fenn Street Gang
