= Listed buildings in Debenham =

Historic structures in Suffolk, England

Debenham is a village and civil parish in the Mid Suffolk District of Suffolk, England. It contains 95 listed buildings that are recorded in the National Heritage List for England. Of these one is grade I, seven are grade II* and 87 are grade II.

This list is based on the information retrieved online from Historic England.

== Key ==
| Grade | Criteria |
|---|---|
| I | Buildings that are of exceptional interest |
| II* | Particularly important buildings of more than special interest |
| II | Buildings that are of special interest |

== Listing ==
| Name | Grade | Location | Type | Completed (Note: The date given is the date used by Historic England as significant for the initial building or that of an important part in the structure's description.) | Date designated | Grid ref. (Note: The grid reference is based on the British national grid reference system, sometimes known as OSGB36, used by the Ordnance Survey.) Geo-coordinates | Notes | Entry number (Note: The "List Entry Number" is a unique number assigned to each listed building and scheduled monument by Historic England.) | Image | Wikidata |
|---|---|---|---|---|---|---|---|---|---|---|
| Outbuilding 10 Metres North of Ulveston Hall | II | | | | 24 June 1988 | TM1492463243; 52°13′32″N 1°08′43″E | | 1198979 | Upload Photo | Q26494902 |
| Barn 50 Metres South West of Crows Hall | II | | | | 9 December 1955 | TM1917862798; 52°13′11″N 1°12′26″E | | 1283628 | Upload Photo | Q26572467 |
| Bryces Farmhouse | II | | | | 24 June 1988 | TM1538663641; 52°13′44″N 1°09′09″E | | 1198904 | Upload Photo | Q26494866 |
| Crows Hall (including Bridge Over Moat and Walling Lining Inner Side of Moat to West and South) | II* | | architectural structure | | 9 December 1955 | TM1923462827; 52°13′12″N 1°12′29″E | | 1352472 | Crows Hall (including Bridge Over Moat and Walling Lining Inner Side of Moat to West and South) More images | Q17540198 |
| Old Hall | II | | | | 24 June 1988 | TM1552164466; 52°14′10″N 1°09′18″E | | 1032347 | Upload Photo | Q26283746 |
| Roamwood Green Farmhouse | II | | | | 24 June 1988 | TM1584864903; 52°14′24″N 1°09′36″E | | 1283609 | Upload Photo | Q26572448 |
| Ulveston Hall | II | | | | 9 December 1955 | TM1492763223; 52°13′31″N 1°08′44″E | | 1352473 | Upload Photo | Q26635485 |
| Corner House | II | 2, Aspall Road | | | 9 December 1955 | TM1739163392; 52°13′33″N 1°10′54″E | | 1032348 | Upload Photo | Q26283747 |
| 4, Aspall Road | II | 4, Aspall Road, IP14 6QA | | | 9 December 1955 | TM1738463400; 52°13′33″N 1°10′53″E | | 1283588 | Upload Photo | Q26572428 |
| Bridge House | II | 6, Aspall Road | | | 9 December 1955 | TM1737663409; 52°13′33″N 1°10′53″E | | 1032349 | Upload Photo | Q26283748 |
| Bridge Place | II | 8, Aspall Road | | | 9 December 1955 | TM1736763424; 52°13′34″N 1°10′52″E | | 1199019 | Upload Photo | Q26494938 |
| 10, Aspall Road | II | 10, Aspall Road | | | 9 December 1955 | TM1736163432; 52°13′34″N 1°10′52″E | | 1032306 | Upload Photo | Q26283704 |
| The Old Cooperage | II | 12, Aspall Road | | | 9 December 1955 | TM1736063442; 52°13′35″N 1°10′52″E | | 1032307 | Upload Photo | Q26283705 |
| 14, Aspall Road | II | 14, Aspall Road | | | 24 June 1988 | TM1735063478; 52°13′36″N 1°10′52″E | | 1352454 | Upload Photo | Q26635468 |
| 22, Aspall Road | II | 22, Aspall Road | | | 24 June 1988 | TM1733863499; 52°13′36″N 1°10′51″E | | 1032308 | Upload Photo | Q26283706 |
| 50, Aspall Road | II | 50, Aspall Road | | | 24 June 1988 | TM1735663661; 52°13′42″N 1°10′52″E | | 1352455 | Upload Photo | Q26635469 |
| Debenham House | II | 52, Aspall Road | | | 24 June 1988 | TM1736363675; 52°13′42″N 1°10′53″E | | 1032309 | Upload Photo | Q26283707 |
| Barn 30 Metres West of Gull Farmhouse | II | Aspall Road | | | 24 June 1988 | TM1734663917; 52°13′50″N 1°10′52″E | | 1352456 | Upload Photo | Q26635470 |
| Gull Farmhouse | II | Aspall Road | | | 24 June 1988 | TM1737863925; 52°13′50″N 1°10′54″E | | 1032310 | Upload Photo | Q26283708 |
| 6, Chancery Lane | II | 6, Chancery Lane | | | 24 June 1988 | TM1731963462; 52°13′35″N 1°10′50″E | | 1032311 | Upload Photo | Q26283709 |
| 11, Chancery Lane | II | 11, Chancery Lane | | | 24 June 1988 | TM1731563395; 52°13′33″N 1°10′50″E | | 1032312 | Upload Photo | Q26283710 |
| 15 and 17, Chancery Lane | II | 15 and 17, Chancery Lane | | | 24 June 1988 | TM1731663409; 52°13′34″N 1°10′50″E | | 1283496 | Upload Photo | Q26572341 |
| River Cottage | II | 18, Chancery Lane | | | 24 June 1988 | TM1728963571; 52°13′39″N 1°10′49″E | | 1352457 | Upload Photo | Q26635471 |
| 25 and 27, Chancery Lane | II | 25 and 27, Chancery Lane | | | 24 June 1988 | TM1730163448; 52°13′35″N 1°10′49″E | | 1283500 | Upload Photo | Q26572345 |
| Oak House | II | 33, Chancery Lane | | | 24 June 1988 | TM1729163474; 52°13′36″N 1°10′49″E | | 1032313 | Upload Photo | Q26283711 |
| The Old Beer House | II | 37, Chancery Lane, Stowmarket, IP14 6PH | | | 24 June 1988 | TM1728263511; 52°13′37″N 1°10′48″E | | 1283511 | Upload Photo | Q26572355 |
| Ivy House | II | 39 and 41, Chancery Lane | | | 24 June 1988 | TM1726863535; 52°13′38″N 1°10′47″E | | 1032314 | Upload Photo | Q26283712 |
| United Reform Church | II | Chancery Lane | church building | | 24 June 1988 | TM1730863423; 52°13′34″N 1°10′49″E | | 1352458 | United Reform Church More images | Q26635472 |
| Cherry Tree Inn | II | 2, Cherrytree Green | inn | | 9 December 1955 | TM1748662932; 52°13′18″N 1°10′58″E | | 1032315 | Cherry Tree Inn More images | Q26283713 |
| Cherry Tree Farmhouse | II | Cherrytree Green | | | 24 June 1988 | TM1735362868; 52°13′16″N 1°10′50″E | | 1283477 | Upload Photo | Q26572324 |
| 2 and 3, Cross Green | II | 2 and 3, Cross Green | building | | 24 June 1988 | TM1748463144; 52°13′25″N 1°10′58″E | | 1283459 | 2 and 3, Cross Green More images | Q26572307 |
| 4-6, Cross Green | II | 4-6, Cross Green | | | 24 June 1988 | TM1751263167; 52°13′25″N 1°10′59″E | | 1032316 | Upload Photo | Q26283714 |
| 8, Cross Green | II | 8, Cross Green | | | 24 June 1988 | TM1752763181; 52°13′26″N 1°11′00″E | | 1199263 | Upload Photo | Q26495157 |
| Barrett's Green | II | 9, Cross Green | | | 24 June 1988 | TM1754463170; 52°13′25″N 1°11′01″E | | 1032317 | Upload Photo | Q26283715 |
| 10 and 11, Cross Green | II | 10 and 11, Cross Green | | | 24 June 1988 | TM1753163162; 52°13′25″N 1°11′00″E | | 1032318 | Upload Photo | Q26283716 |
| The Market Cross | II* | 2, Gracechurch Street, Stowmarket, IP14 6RA | guild house | | 9 December 1955 | TM1737463265; 52°13′29″N 1°10′52″E | | 1199276 | The Market Cross More images | Q17536290 |
| Ancient House | II* | 3, Gracechurch Street | house | | 9 December 1955 | TM1736563241; 52°13′28″N 1°10′52″E | | 1032319 | Ancient House More images | Q17535325 |
| Rose Cottage | II | 7, Gracechurch Street | | | 24 June 1988 | TM1734663241; 52°13′28″N 1°10′51″E | | 1199317 | Upload Photo | Q26495206 |
| Farthings | II | 13, Gracechurch Street | | | 24 June 1988 | TM1731163241; 52°13′28″N 1°10′49″E | | 1352459 | Upload Photo | Q26635473 |
| 15, Gracechurch Street | II | 15, Gracechurch Street | | | 24 June 1988 | TM1730463241; 52°13′28″N 1°10′49″E | | 1283426 | Upload Photo | Q26572279 |
| Fern Cottage | II | 17, Gracechurch Street, Stowmarket, IP14 6RA | | | 24 June 1988 | TM1729663244; 52°13′28″N 1°10′48″E | | 1032320 | Upload Photo | Q26283718 |
| The Merchant House | II | 24, Gracechurch Street, Stowmarket, IP14 6RE | | | 12 January 1973 | TM1722263268; 52°13′29″N 1°10′44″E | | 1283430 | Upload Photo | Q26572283 |
| 33, Gracechurch Street | II | 33, Gracechurch Street | | | 24 June 1988 | TM1716763259; 52°13′29″N 1°10′42″E | | 1032321 | Upload Photo | Q26283719 |
| Spring Cottage | II | 39, Gracechurch Street | | | 24 June 1988 | TM1711763276; 52°13′30″N 1°10′39″E | | 1283436 | Upload Photo | Q26572288 |
| Eureka Cottage | II | 16, Great Back Lane | | | 24 June 1988 | TM1725763477; 52°13′36″N 1°10′47″E | | 1352460 | Upload Photo | Q26635474 |
| 45 and 47, Great Back Lane | II | 45 and 47, Great Back Lane | | | 24 June 1988 | TM1724863462; 52°13′35″N 1°10′46″E | | 1199375 | Upload Photo | Q26495261 |
| Swiss Farm Butchers the Debenham Gallery | II* | 3, High Street | | | 9 December 1955 | TM1737163361; 52°13′32″N 1°10′53″E | | 1032322 | Upload Photo | Q17535331 |
| 6, High Street | II | 6, High Street | | | 24 June 1988 | TM1734663346; 52°13′31″N 1°10′51″E | | 1032326 | Upload Photo | Q26283723 |
| The Red Lion | II | 8, High Street | pub | | 9 December 1955 | TM1734763335; 52°13′31″N 1°10′51″E | | 1199618 | The Red Lion More images | Q26495484 |
| 10, 12-14 High Street | II | 10, 12-14, High Street, Stowmarket, IP14 6QJ | | | 9 December 1955 | TM1734963316; 52°13′30″N 1°10′51″E | | 1032327 | Upload Photo | Q26283724 |
| Broadway House | II | 19, High Street | | | 9 December 1955 | TM1739063300; 52°13′30″N 1°10′53″E | | 1283377 | Upload Photo | Q26572240 |
| Stone Cottage | II | 20, High Street | | | 9 December 1955 | TM1735663279; 52°13′29″N 1°10′52″E | | 1032285 | Upload Photo | Q26283678 |
| Lanchester Antiques Old House the Gables | II* | 21, High Street | architectural structure | | 9 December 1955 | TM1739863276; 52°13′29″N 1°10′54″E | | 1352462 | Lanchester Antiques Old House the Gables More images | Q17540184 |
| 22 and 24, High Street | II | 22 and 24, High Street | | | 24 June 1988 | TM1735863262; 52°13′29″N 1°10′52″E | | 1352484 | Upload Photo | Q26635495 |
| Bleak House | II | 26, High Street | | | 9 December 1955 | TM1737963241; 52°13′28″N 1°10′53″E | | 1032286 | Upload Photo | Q26283679 |
| Sycamores | II* | 27, High Street | | | 9 December 1955 | TM1740063256; 52°13′28″N 1°10′54″E | | 1199486 | Upload Photo | Q17536297 |
| St Mary | II | 29, High Street | | | 9 December 1955 | TM1740463244; 52°13′28″N 1°10′54″E | | 1032325 | Upload Photo | Q26283722 |
| The Limes | II | 30, High Street | | | 9 December 1955 | TM1738463210; 52°13′27″N 1°10′53″E | | 1032287 | Upload Photo | Q26283680 |
| 31-37, High Street | II* | 31-37, High Street | building | | 9 December 1955 | TM1740963228; 52°13′28″N 1°10′54″E | | 1199502 | 31-37, High Street More images | Q17536304 |
| Debenham Fish Shop | II | 34 and 36, High Street | | | 9 December 1955 | TM1739263198; 52°13′27″N 1°10′53″E | | 1032288 | Upload Photo | Q26283682 |
| 38, High Street | II | 38, High Street | | | 9 December 1955 | TM1739663186; 52°13′26″N 1°10′53″E | | 1352486 | Upload Photo | Q26635497 |
| Sexton Cottage | II | 39, High Street | | | 9 December 1955 | TM1740963220; 52°13′27″N 1°10′54″E | | 1352463 | Upload Photo | Q26635476 |
| 40 and 42, High Street | II | 40 and 42, High Street | | | 9 December 1955 | TM1740263181; 52°13′26″N 1°10′54″E | | 1032289 | Upload Photo | Q26283683 |
| Warwick House | II | 44, High Street | | | 24 June 1988 | TM1740863168; 52°13′26″N 1°10′54″E | | 1352487 | Upload Photo | Q26635498 |
| R and G Webster | II | 50, High Street | | | 24 June 1988 | TM1741863138; 52°13′25″N 1°10′54″E | | 1283231 | Upload Photo | Q26572104 |
| Lovejoy Antiques | II | 52, High Street | | | 24 June 1988 | TM1742163123; 52°13′24″N 1°10′55″E | | 1032290 | Upload Photo | Q26283684 |
| Cloverdene | II | 54, High Street | | | 24 June 1988 | TM1743663119; 52°13′24″N 1°10′55″E | | 1199747 | Upload Photo | Q26495607 |
| 56, High Street | II | 56, High Street | | | 9 December 1955 | TM1744263112; 52°13′24″N 1°10′56″E | | 1032291 | Upload Photo | Q26283685 |
| 64 and 66, High Street | II | 64 and 66, High Street | | | 24 June 1988 | TM1745363091; 52°13′23″N 1°10′56″E | | 1032292 | Upload Photo | Q26283686 |
| 68, High Street | II | 68, High Street | | | 24 June 1988 | TM1747063075; 52°13′23″N 1°10′57″E | | 1283189 | Upload Photo | Q26572068 |
| 72 and 74, High Street | II | 72 and 74, High Street | | | 24 June 1988 | TM1748763051; 52°13′22″N 1°10′58″E | | 1032294 | Upload Photo | Q26283689 |
| Angel Inn | II | High Street | inn | | 9 December 1955 | TM1737463346; 52°13′31″N 1°10′53″E | | 1199398 | Angel Inn More images | Q26495284 |
| Church of St Mary | I | High Street | church building | | 9 December 1955 | TM1744563208; 52°13′27″N 1°10′56″E | | 1283304 | Church of St Mary More images | Q17526352 |
| Debenham War Memorial | II | High Street, IP14 6QN | war memorial | | 12 September 2018 | TM1741963192; 52°13′26″N 1°10′55″E | | 1459053 | Debenham War Memorial More images | Q66479924 |
| Gate House Lloyds Bank | II | 7a, High Street | | | 9 December 1955 | TM1738163333; 52°13′31″N 1°10′53″E | | 1352461 | Upload Photo | Q26635475 |
| L Aldous | II | High Street | | | 9 December 1955 | TM1738363224; 52°13′27″N 1°10′53″E | | 1352485 | Upload Photo | Q26635496 |
| Minsmere House | II | 15a, High Street | | | 9 December 1955 | TM1738363313; 52°13′30″N 1°10′53″E | | 1199436 | Upload Photo | Q26495322 |
| Oak House | II | High Street | | | 9 December 1955 | TM1738663324; 52°13′31″N 1°10′53″E | | 1032323 | Upload Photo | Q26283720 |
| Pump 10 Metres East of Number 56 | II | High Street | | | 24 June 1988 | TM1745563111; 52°13′24″N 1°10′56″E | | 1283186 | Upload Photo | Q26572065 |
| Tawney Owl Restaurant | II | High Street | | | 24 June 1988 | TM1747763066; 52°13′22″N 1°10′57″E | | 1032293 | Upload Photo | Q26283688 |
| Telephone Kiosk | II | High Street | | | 12 August 1987 | TM1736063316; 52°13′30″N 1°10′52″E | | 1032284 | Upload Photo | Q26283677 |
| The Recess | II | High Street | | | 9 December 1955 | TM1739463313; 52°13′30″N 1°10′54″E | | 1032324 | Upload Photo | Q26283721 |
| Smyths House | II | 1 and 2, Kenton Road | | | 24 June 1988 | TM1811063285; 52°13′28″N 1°11′31″E | | 1199815 | Upload Photo | Q26495672 |
| Barn 30 Metres South West of Hill Farmhouse | II | Kenton Road | | | 24 June 1988 | TM1863363854; 52°13′46″N 1°12′00″E | | 1199851 | Upload Photo | Q26495706 |
| Pages Mill | II | Kenton Road | | | 24 June 1988 | TM1818763774; 52°13′44″N 1°11′36″E | | 1032295 | Upload Photo | Q26283690 |
| Red House Farmhouse | II | Kenton Road | | | 24 June 1988 | TM1779064866; 52°14′20″N 1°11′18″E | | 1032296 | Upload Photo | Q26283691 |
| Kiln Cottage Weavers Cottage | II | 8, Low Road | | | 24 June 1988 | TM1748363019; 52°13′21″N 1°10′58″E | | 1283179 | Upload Photo | Q26572059 |
| 20, Low Road | II | 20, Low Road | | | 24 June 1988 | TM1734462937; 52°13′18″N 1°10′50″E | | 1032297 | Upload Photo | Q26283693 |
| Malting Farmhouse | II | Low Road | | | 24 June 1988 | TM1697162518; 52°13′05″N 1°10′30″E | | 1283153 | Upload Photo | Q26572035 |
| Poplar Hall | II | Low Road | | | 24 June 1988 | TM1638661867; 52°12′45″N 1°09′57″E | | 1032298 | Upload Photo | Q26283694 |
| 2 and 3 White Hall Cottages | II | 2 and 3 White Hall Cottages, Stowmarket Road | | | 24 June 1988 | TM1537061890; 52°12′47″N 1°09′04″E | | 1352488 | Upload Photo | Q26635499 |
| Grange Farmhouse | II | Stowmarket Road | | | 24 June 1988 | TM1541861805; 52°12′44″N 1°09′06″E | | 1199928 | Upload Photo | Q26495774 |
| White Hall Cottage | II | Stowmarket Road | | | 24 June 1988 | TM1584062135; 52°12′54″N 1°09′29″E | | 1283125 | Upload Photo | Q26572009 |
| 1 and 3, Water Lane | II | 1 and 3, Water Lane | | | 10 October 1977 | TM1741763401; 52°13′33″N 1°10′55″E | | 1032299 | Upload Photo | Q26283695 |
| The Chestnuts | II | 5, Water Lane | | | 24 June 1988 | TM1743163412; 52°13′33″N 1°10′56″E | | 1352489 | Upload Photo | Q26635500 |

== See also ==
- Grade I listed buildings in Suffolk
- Grade II* listed buildings in Suffolk

== Sources ==
- Bettely, James; Pevsner, Nikolaus (2015) [1961], Suffolk: West, The Buildings of England, New Haven and London: Yale University Press, ISBN 978-0-300-19655-9
