= Webster's Mill, Framsden =

Windmill in Framsden, Suffolk, England

Webster’s Mill, Framsden
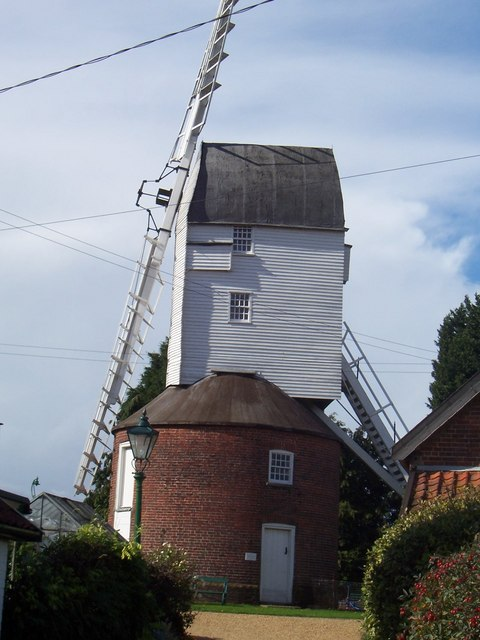
- Framsden Mill in 2006
- Interactive map of Webster’s Mill, Framsden

Origin
- Grid reference: TM 1917 5976
- Coordinates: 52.1924°N 1.2053°E
- Year built: 1760

Information
- Purpose: Corn mill
- Type: Post mill
- Roundhouse storeys: Two storey roundhouse
- No. of sails: Four
- Type of sails: Patent sails
- Winding: Fantail
- No. of pairs of millstones: Two pairs
- Size of millstones: 4 feet 6 inches (1.37 m) and 4 feet (1.22 m)

Framsden Windmill is a Grade II* listed post mill at Framsden, Suffolk, England which is preserved. The mill was known as Webster's Mill when it was a working mill.

== History ==
Framsden Windmill was built in 1760 for John Flick. In 1836, the mill was bought by John Smith, a brickmaker from St Osyth, Essex. Smith had the mill raised by 18 feet (5.49 m) and modernised by John Whitmore and Son, millwrights, of Wickham Market. In 1843, the mill was bought by William Bond, who owned the mill until 1872 (and worked it for at least part of that time), when it was sold to Joseph Rivers. In 1879, the mill was sold to Edmund Webster, who had been listed as a miller at the mill in 1854, and later passed to his son Edmund Samuel Webster, who worked the mill until ca. 1936. In June 1966 a group of volunteers started to restore the mill. Two new Patent sails were fitted in 1969.

== Restoration ==
Restoration of Framsden Windmill commenced in June 1966. A stock had broken and half a sail had fallen shortly before, so the remaining half sail and its partner were removed, along with the stock. The roof was made watertight and the left side bottom side rail was strengthened. This work was carried out by Frank Farrow, Stanley Freese, Christopher Hullcoop, Vincent Pargeter and Peter Stenning. In 1967, the main post was strengthened with iron bars and steel hoops as it was badly split. The mill was at that time head-sick, and leant to the right. This was attended to, and the mill put back on an even keel. The right hand side girt was found to have broken at the joint with the crown tree. It was reinforced with a heavy angle iron bolted on top. In 1968, the two remaining sails were lowered for repair and the stock was reinforced by fitting a pair of clamps. In 1969, the Brake Wheel was repaired, with two new elm segments being made and fitted. The repaired sails were refitted in March and July. The striking gear was repaired, with the cross from Victoria Mill, Eye replacing that broken when the sail fell. On 7 February 1970, the mill turned by wind again. A lightning conductor was fitted and the Brake Wheel was re-cogged with hornbeam. The Brake Wheel originally had 61 cogs, and was refitted with 78 cogs when the mill was modernised. In 1971, work was done to get the left-hand pair of millstones into working order and repair the fantail carriage. In May 1972, the mill ground wheat for the first time in preservation. The rear steps were repaired and the fantail carriage fitted in 1973.

== Description ==
Framsden Windmill was built as an open trestle post mill with Common sails and winded by a tailpole. The two pairs of millstones were arranged Head and Tail, each driven by a compass arm wheel. A roundhouse was added in 1836 and a fantail was added. At this time, the wooden windshaft was replaced by a cast iron one and Patent sails were added. The compass-arm Brake Wheel was converted to clasp-arm construction. The mill drives two pairs of French Burr millstones in the breast of the mill, the left hand pair are 4 feet (1.22 m) diameter and the right hand pair are 4 feet 6 inches (1.37 m) diameter. Unusually, the Upright Shaft is offset. The millstones are geared at 7.8:1. The rear of the mill has been extended to accommodate a flour dresser. The Patent sails have a weather of 25˚ at the heel and 5˚ at the tip. The frame of the mill was built of oak, with pitch pine being introduced for the Sprattle Beam and Tail beam when the mill was modernised. The mill is 48 feet (14.63 m) to the roof, making it the second tallest post mill in Suffolk. The sails were 7 feet 6 inches (2.29 m) wide with a span of 64 feet (19.51 m).

== Millers ==
- John Flick 1760–
- John Smith 1836–43
- William Bond 1843–72
- Joseph Rivers 1872–79
- Edmund Webster 1879–
- Edmund Samuel Webster — 1936

Reference for above.
