= Ashfield cum Thorpe =

Civil parish in Suffolk, England

Coordinates: 52.22°N 1.23°E

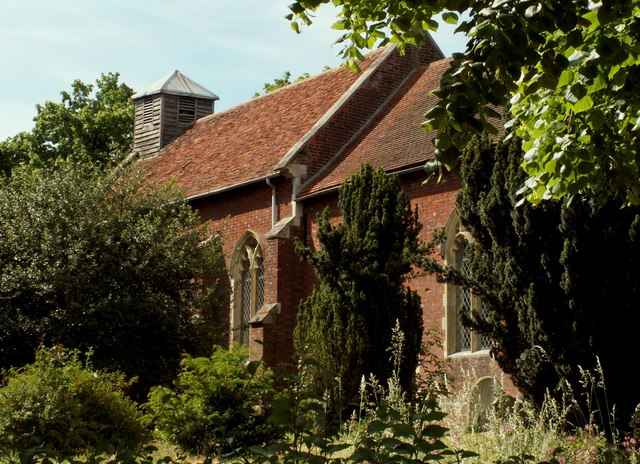
- St. Mary's church, Ashfield-cum-Thorpe

- Location within Suffolk
- Area: 6.39 km^{2} (2.47 sq mi)
- Population: 219 (2011 Census)
  - Density: 34/km^{2} (88/sq mi)
- OS grid reference: TM210627
- District: Mid Suffolk
- Shire county: Suffolk
- Region: East
- Country: England
- Sovereign state: United Kingdom
- Post town: Stowmarket
- Postcode district: IP14
- Dialling code: 01728
- Police: Suffolk
- Fire: Suffolk
- Ambulance: East of England
- UK Parliament: Central Suffolk and North Ipswich

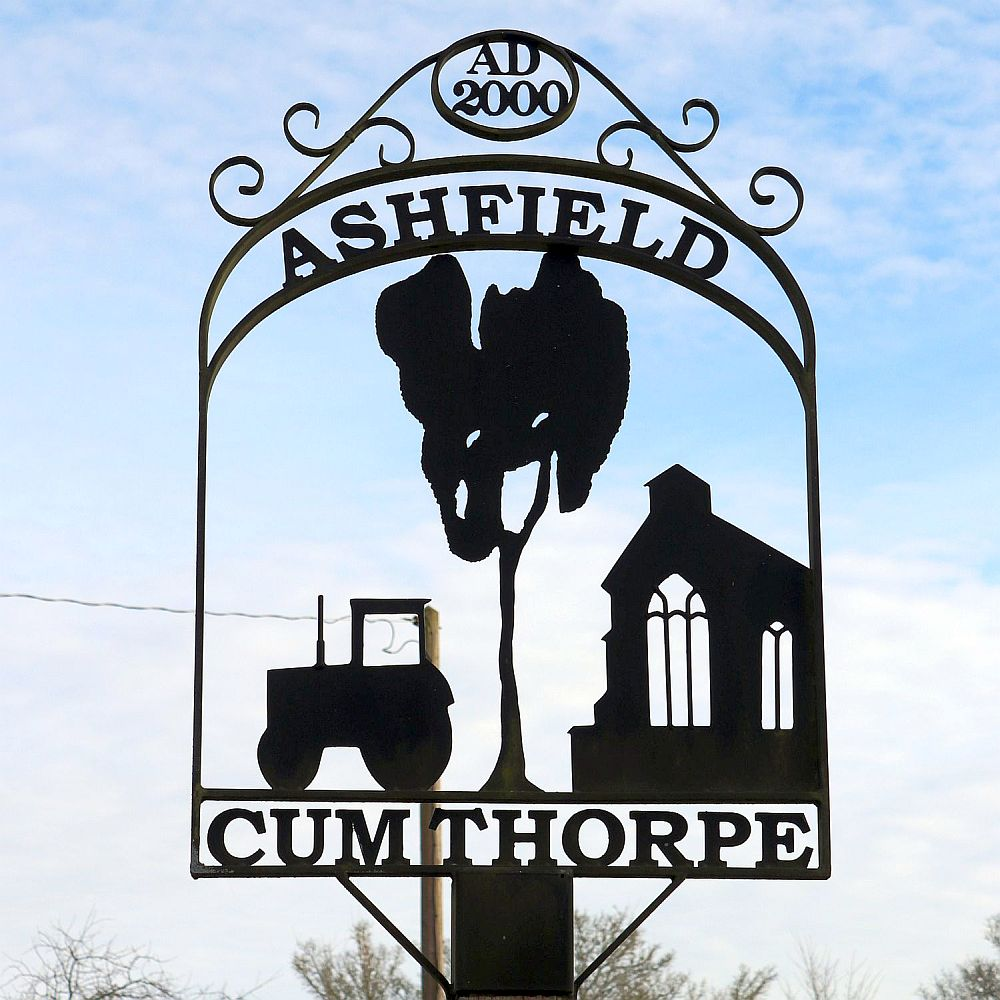
Ashfield Cum Thorpe village sign

Ashfield cum Thorpe is a civil parish in the Mid Suffolk district of Suffolk, England, between the town of Framlingham to the East and the village of Debenham to the West.

It is of Anglo-Saxon origin and is mentioned in the Domesday Book, when it had a population of around 45 adult men (and total population probably similar to the current figure). It has a church and a village hall, and used to have a school, a pub and two shops. Some of the houses in the village date back to the 15th century.

The name "Ashfield cum Thorpe" (Ashfield with Thorpe) refers to the civil parish, which consists of the village of Ashfield and the nearby hamlet of Thorpe. In more recent years (by 2015), the village is now named Ashfield cum Thorpe on Ordnance Survey maps, and Thorpe has only appeared on maps as Thorpe Hall for a long time.

The church of St Mary existed in Ashfield at the time of the Domesday Book, and at some time after, St Peter's church was built at Thorpe. This latter fell into ruins by around 1600, and the church at Ashfield was used by both sets of villagers. The patron of St Mary's was Baron Henniker of Thornham Magna. By the late 18th Century, Ashfield church was in disrepair, and it was the turn of Ashfield villages to use Thorpe church. This went on until 1853, when Lord Henniker paid for a new St Mary church in Ashfield. Thorpe church was rebuilt in 1739 by George Pitt, retaining its late Saxon tower. Thorpe church is now in ruins, only part of the tower remaining.

The village was briefly featured in an episode of the BBC television mockumentary sitcom People Just Do Nothing. Nearby villages include Earl Soham, Monk Soham, Kenton. Debenham and Framsden.

== Notable residents ==
- John Chapman (1865-1933), Roman Catholic priest born in the village who was the 4th Abbot of Downside Abbey and founded Worth School in West Sussex.
