= Fox Fritillary Meadow =

Protected area in Suffolk, England

Coordinates: 52.2°N 1.202°E

- Site of Special Scientific Interest
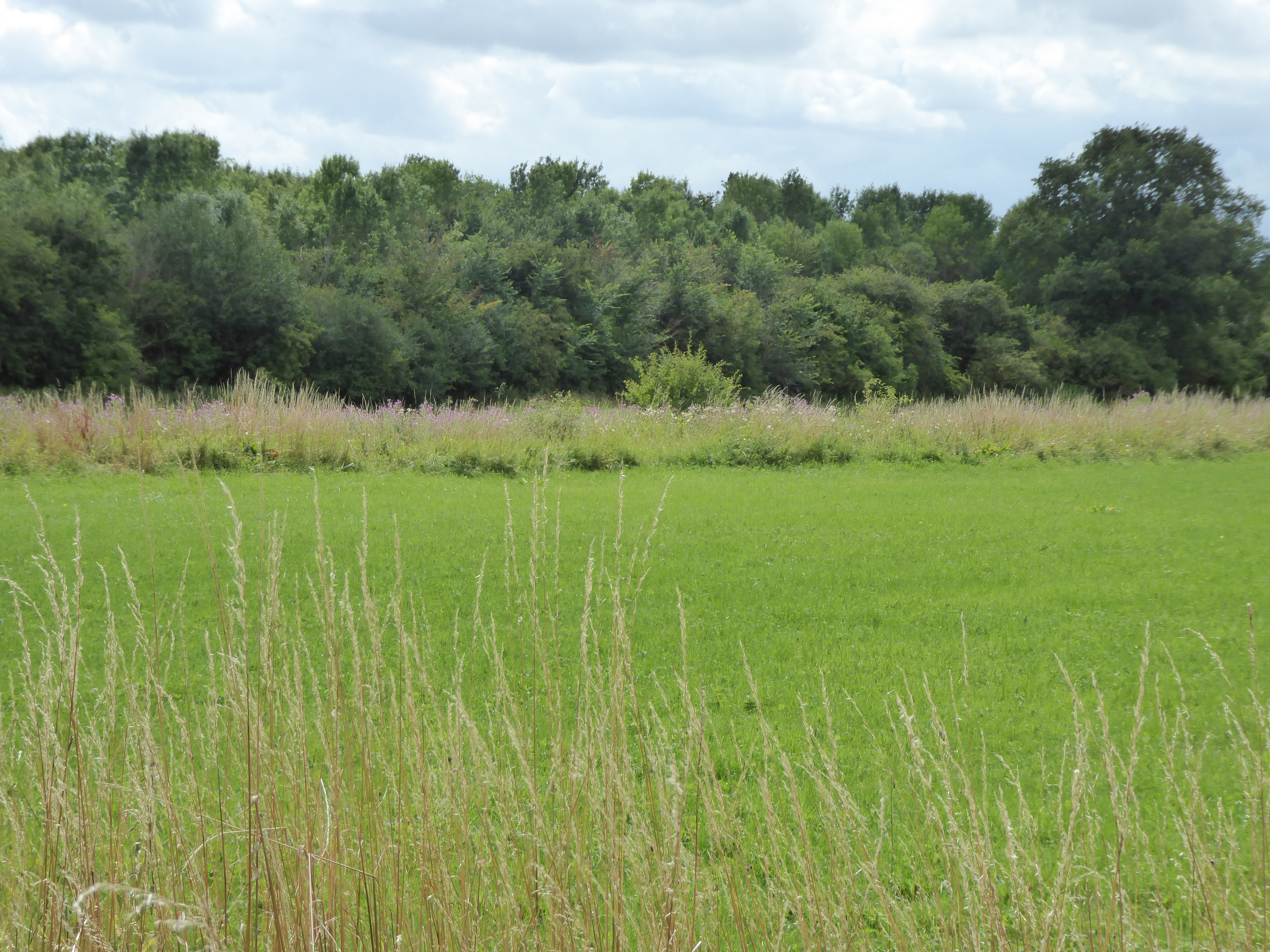
- Location of Fox Fritillary Meadow.
- Area of search: Suffolk
- Grid reference: TM 189 606
- Interest: Biological
- Area: 2.4 hectares
- Notification date: 1983
- Location map: Magic Map

Fox Fritillary Meadow is a 2.4-hectare (5.9-acre) biological Site of Special Scientific Interest north of Framsden in Suffolk. It is owned and managed by the Suffolk Wildlife Trust.

This unimproved meadow is located on heavy alluvial soils at the bottom of a valley. It has a rich variety of flora, including the herbs cowslip, cuckooflower and ragged robin, together with the largest population in East Anglia of the rare snake's head fritillary.

This site is closed to the public apart from an open day in April.
