= Bernard Rooke =

British artist and studio potter (born 1938)

Bernard Rooke (born 1938) is a British artist and studio potter. Rooke has exhibited his "Brutalist" ceramics and painting both in the UK and abroad with work in many collections both public and private including the Victoria and Albert Museum, Cleveland Museum of Art, Nuffield Foundation, Paisley Museum and Art Galleries, Leicester Museum, Buckinghamshire County Museum, Röhsska Museum in Sweden and the Trondheim Kunstmuseum in Norway. His work has become sought after at auction houses in the UK and USA.

== Early years ==
Bernard Rooke attended Ipswich School of Art studying painting and lithography before going on to study at Goldsmiths College of Art. It was while studying here that he decided to take up pottery. Although unfamiliar with this craft and tradition, he found that working with clay provided new opportunities for freedom of interpretation and creativity.

== Forest Hill studio ==
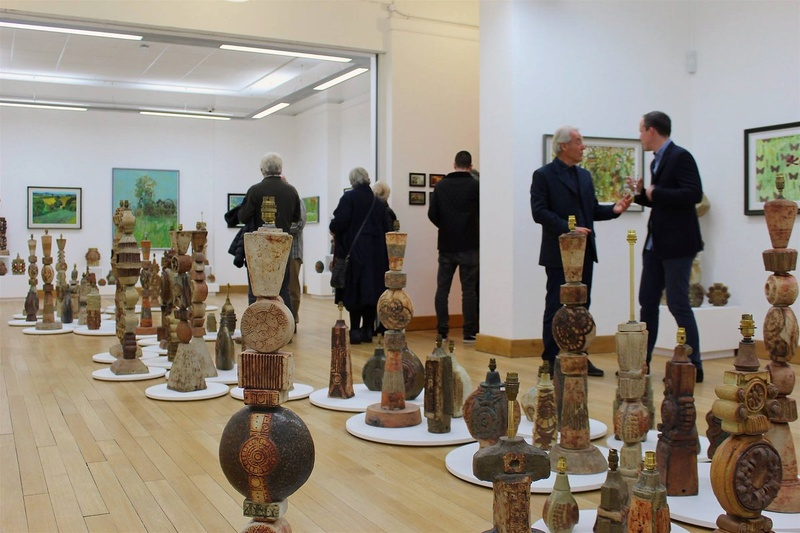
Bernard Rooke at the 2017 “Glass, Light, Paint & Clay” Exhibition, Peterborough Museum and Art Gallery

In 1960, Rooke set up his first pottery in Forest Hill in South London along with Alan Wallwork. It was a very small room with enough space for a small electric kiln. He was initially using mainly hand building, coiling, blocking and slabbing techniques. While researching ideas, he was supporting himself by part-time lecturing at London University, Goldsmiths College and St Mary's College. In addition, Rooke's membership of 'The Craftsman Potters' Association' enabled him to show his work in a shop in Carnaby Street in London.

== The Old Mill, Swilland in Suffolk ==
In 1967, both the need for a larger working space and becoming disillusioned with living in London spurred Rooke into moving out of the city and to an old mill building in Swilland in Suffolk.

By the 1970s, a gallery space was opened in the windmill and run by Susan Rooke, Bernard's wife, selling work to locals and tourists as well as to American airmen based nearby. The vision for Mill Gallery was beginning to develop and alongside this a reputation was building bringing in a good source of income.

== Later years ==
Sons Aaron and Felix were becoming more involved with the running of the pottery, giving Bernard more time to develop new ideas and designs and more time to continue with his painting. In 2004, the Rooke family decided not to sell to the public through the gallery anymore and close the pottery to concentrate more on painting and printmaking.

In 2017 Bernard's lighting was featured in the Exhibition: “Glass, Light, Paint & Clay” at the Peterborough Museum and Art Gallery. The exhibition featured four artists: Bernard Rooke, John Maltby, Duncan Clarke and Sam Herman selected from the Graham Cooley collection. The catalogue (ISBN 978-1-78808-185-6) features an interview with Bernard in which he describes his life and work.
