= Gosbeck Wood =

Woodland in Suffolk, England

Coordinates: 52.159°N 1.134°E

- Site of Special Scientific Interest
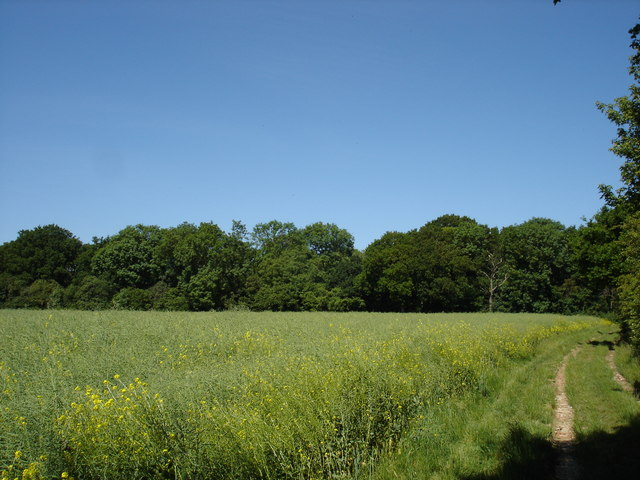
- Location of Gosbeck Wood.
- Area of search: Suffolk
- Grid reference: TM 145 556
- Interest: Biological
- Area: 22.8 hectares
- Notification date: 1984
- Location map: Magic Map

Gosbeck Wood is a 22.8-hectare (56-acre) biological Site of Special Scientific Interest east of Needham Market in Suffolk.

This is an ancient coppice with standards wood mainly on boulder clay, with some areas of sandy soil. Dog's mercury is dominant in the ground flora, and other plants include spurge laurel, wood spurge, herb paris and hairy woodrush.

A footpath goes through the wood.
