= Swilland =

Village in Suffolk, England

Coordinates: 52.131°N 1.197°E

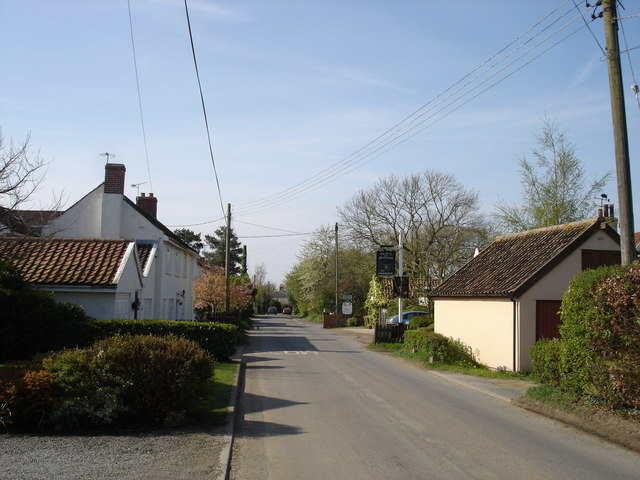
- Swilland village

- Location within Suffolk
- Population: 163 (2011 Census)
- OS grid reference: TM1875052953
  - London: 87.7 mi (141.1 km)
- Civil parish: Swilland
- District: East Suffolk
- Shire county: Suffolk
- Region: East
- Country: England
- Sovereign state: United Kingdom
- Post town: IPSWICH
- Postcode district: IP6
- Dialling code: 01473
- Police: Suffolk
- Fire: Suffolk
- Ambulance: East of England
- UK Parliament: Central Suffolk and North Ipswich

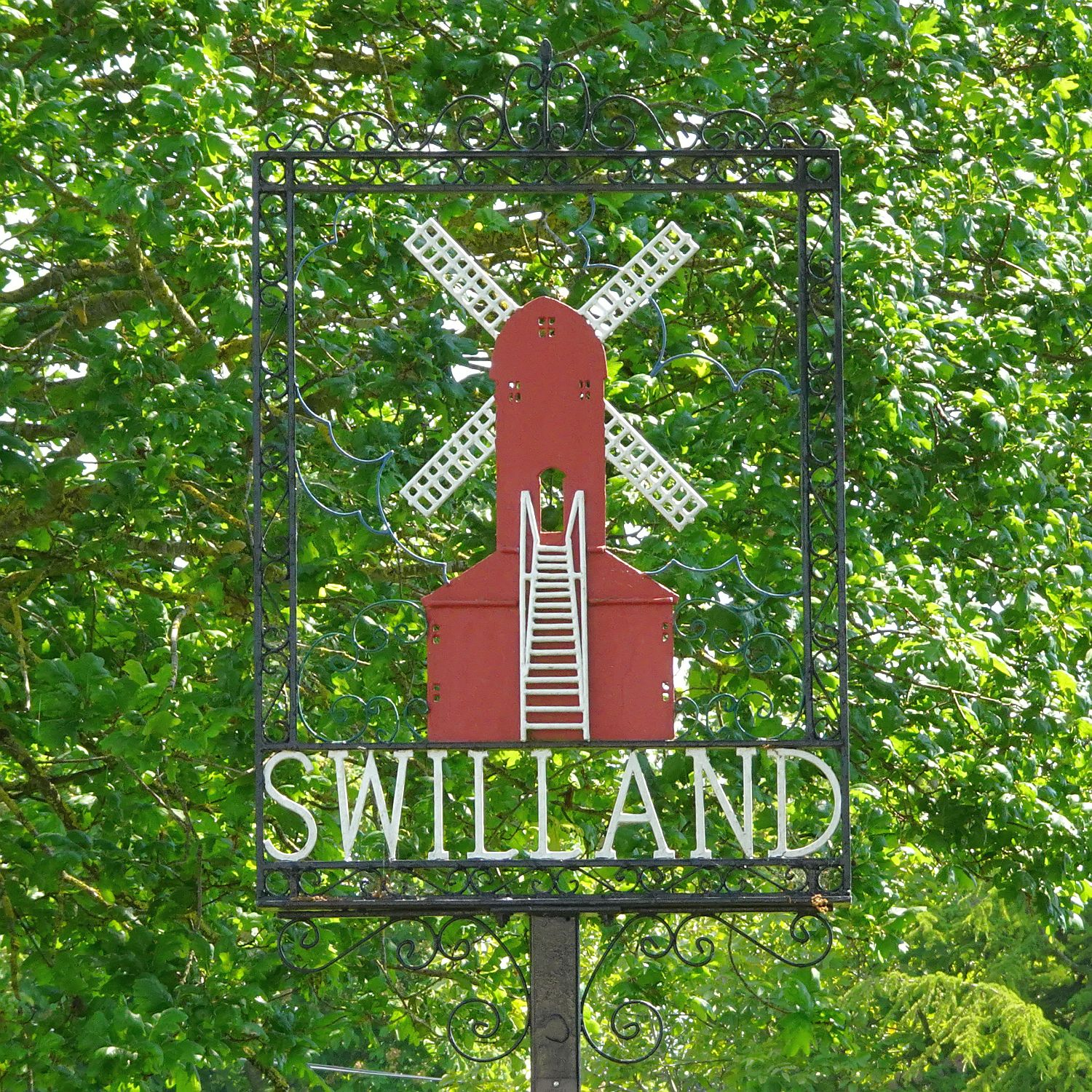
Swilland Village Sign, designed by Giles

Swilland is a village and civil parish, in the East Suffolk district, in the English county of Suffolk. It is north of the large town of Ipswich. Swilland has a church called St Mary's Church and a pub called The Moon & Mushroom Inn which has been awarded Suffolk Pub of The Year on two occasions by the Evening Star. Swilland shares a parish council with Witnesham called "Swilland and Witnesham Grouped Parish Council".

== History ==
Swilland takes its name from Old English with the meaning of "Pig land", this is broken down into two parts with "swīn" meaning a swine and "land" standing for land or and estate.

Swilland is recorded in the Domesday Book as being a medium-sized village located in the Hundred of Claydon, made up of 13 households, consisting of 6 villagers, 6 smallholders and 1 slave. It is recorded that in 1066 the livestock of Swilland consisted of 60 sheep which increased to 1 cob, 8 cattle, 19 pigs and 100 sheep by 1086.

In the 1870s, Swilland was described as:

"SWILLAND, a parish in Bosmere district, Suffolk; 3¾ miles N by E of Westerfield r. station, and 6 N by E of Ipswich. Post town, Ipswich. Acres, 951. Real property, £1,869. Pop., 243. houses, 52. The property is much subdivided."

In 1901 the population was 190, and the parish covered 956 acres.

The parish formed part of the hundred of Bosmere-and-Claydon.

== Demographics ==
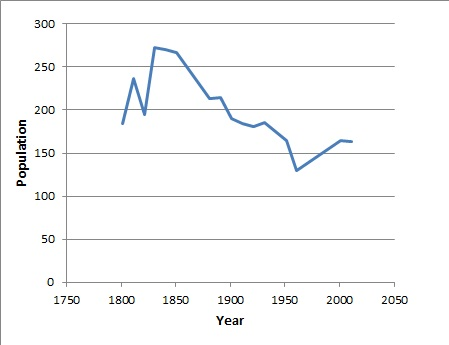
Total Population of Swilland Civil Parish, Suffolk, as reported by the Census of Population from 1881–2011

In 1801 the population of Swilland was 184 which saw a rise to 237 in 1811 but then a slight decline down 195 in 1821. In 1831 the population increased largely up to 272 in 1831, the population then continuously declined to reach its lowest figure in 1961 of 130. The population since 1961 has gradually risen to 163 in 2011 according to the 2011 census. There are records of the boundaries for Swilland dating back all the way to 1831, between 1831 and 1851 Swilland experienced an area change increasing from 520 acres to 951 acres. This is most likely the reason to the population rise in 1831 as the total area of the parish was almost doubled in size.

In 1881 the occupational structure of Swilland was not very diverse with the top occupations being agricultural with 43 people working in this field and 7 people working and dealing in houses, furniture and decorations and only one person being engaged with a professional occupation. Comparing this to the occupational structure of Swilland today is very different. According to the 2011 census there are 93 people employed between the ages of 16 and 74, of these only 10 of which now are involved in agriculture. 23 people now work in skilled trades occupations, which includes agriculture, but there has been as increase in working professionals of which there is now 18. This is a large increase from the 1 working professional in 1881.

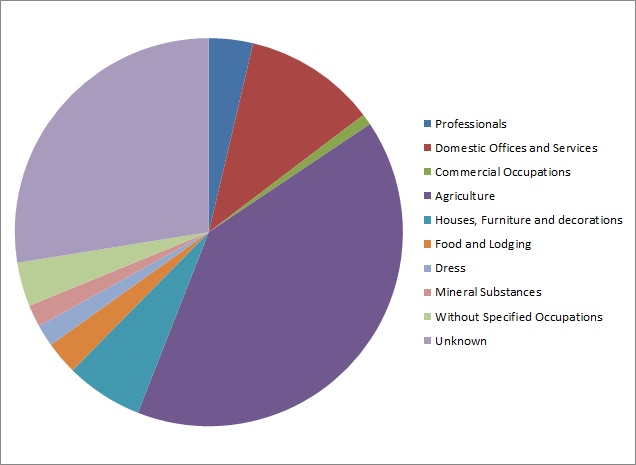
Occupational Structure of Swilland, Suffolk, according to the Census of 1881.

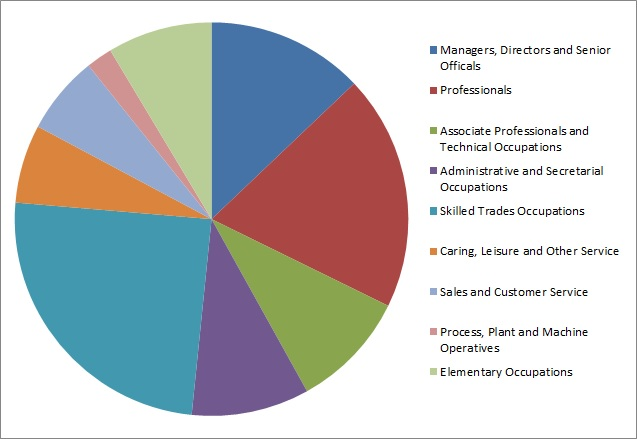
Occupational Structure of Swilland, Suffolk, according to the Census of 2011.

== St Mary Church ==
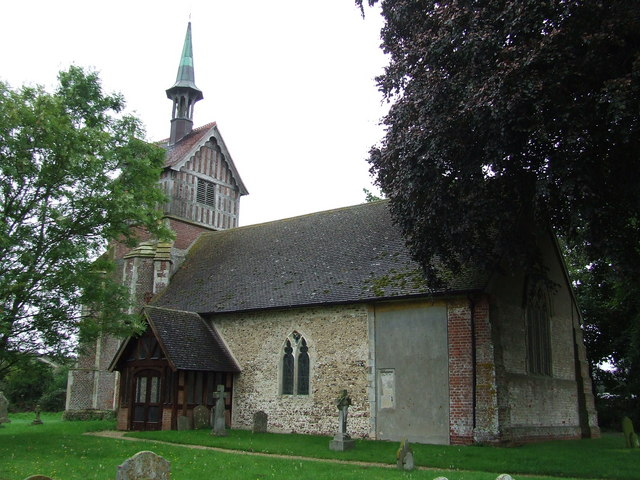
St Mary's Church

St Mary's church in Swilland was founded in the 11th century and is recorded to have graveyard. Records for church burials are recorded back as far as 1679. The Church of St Mary, Swilland is a grade II* listed building, listed on 16 March 1966. The church has a large tower with a lantern spire, this was designed by the Ipswich architect, John Shewell Corder. The church also lays claim to a Norman doorway as you enter the porch into the church.

== Swilland Mill ==
First recorded in Greenwoods country map of 1825, Swilland Mill stood at 51-foot high and was one of the largest post mills in Suffolk. Frederick Buttrum's family owned many large mills in Burgh and Ipswich and is believed to be who Swilland Mill was built for. The Mill often changed hands over the years until it was purchased by Cyril A.Barron in 1920. The use of the windmill was continued until 1936 and was eventually taken down around 1955. It is now holiday accommodation.

== Notable residents ==
- Bernard Rooke (1938- ), artist and studio potter
