= Framsden =

Village in Suffolk, England

Coordinates: 52.183°N 1.217°E

- Location within Suffolk
- Population: 357 (2011)
- District: Mid Suffolk
- Shire county: Suffolk
- Region: East
- Country: England
- Sovereign state: United Kingdom
- Post town: Stowmarket
- Postcode district: IP14

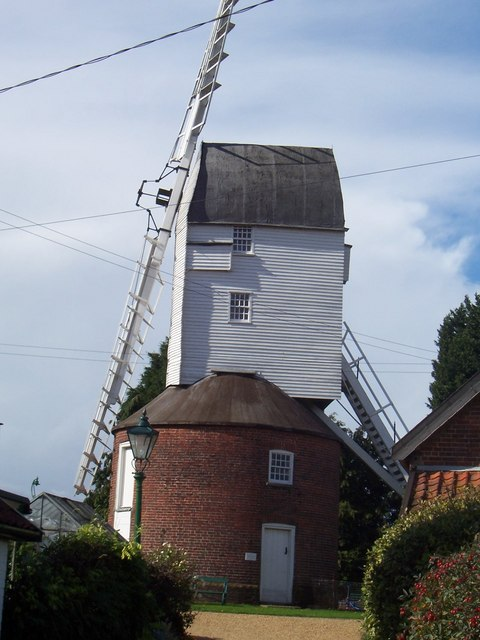
The windmill

Framsden is a village and civil parish located around 10 miles (16 km) north of Ipswich and 3 miles (5 km) south of the small market town of Debenham in the English county of Suffolk. The total population of Framsden in the census of 2001 was 299, with 125 households, 52 people under 16 years, 201 of working age and 46 over 65 years, increasing to a population of 357 in 137 households at the 2011 Census.

== Geography ==
The majority of homes are situated along Framsden Street, with smaller clusters at Peats Corner, along the A1120 and St John's Row, in addition to more scattered houses towards Otley and Cretingham. The B1077 runs through the west of the Parish, and the A1120 cuts across the north of the Parish. Framsden is mostly within the Helmingham Estate, and a lot of property is tenanted. These are traditional estate 2-bedroom cottages or large farmhouses. The estate cottages and school were designed 150 years ago by Lord John Tollemache, to provide dwellings for estate workers. Two cottages shared a bread oven, and each had an acre of land to grow food for the family and to fatten a pig. These cottages, once home to working families, are now described as 'quaint' and are mostly privately rented.

The village has a public house and village hall as well as Helmingham Primary School and Old Schoolhouse Nursery. The parish church is dedicated to St Mary and a Baptist chapel is also located in the parish. In the middle of the 20th century Framsden had 2 blacksmiths, 2 butchers and an abattoir, 2 windmills, a carpenter, wheelwright, pony carts and hurdle maker, brickmaker, cobbler, grocers shop, a horse-drawn cart for transport to Ipswich, a 'carrier'- taking goods to and from Ipswich and a tailor at Hill House. The village shop and post office on the street closed in the early 1990s, and the village now has few basic services. All essential services can be accessed at Debenham, including the High School.

== History ==
Oral History about Framsden has been captured by authors such as George Ewart Evans in Where Beards Wag All, by Robert Simper in Family Fields and more recently by a 'libraries and heritage' project to record interviews of Helmingham estate workers, such as the Clerk of Works and Farm Manager who were employed over 30 years ago. Another Framsden resident has had his reminiscences of early years as a gamekeeper published.

Webster's Mill, Framsden is a landmark in the village.

== Natural environment ==
The village is surrounded by arable farmland, much of which is managed by the Helmingham Estate. This includes preserving veteran trees, ancient hedgerows, old ponds and ancient meadows rich in plant and wildlife diversity. These achievements have been acknowledged by the estate farm winning the FWAG (Farming and Wildlife Advisory Group) Conservation Award for "high level of commitment shown to the principles and delivery of conservation, combined with good farming – an innovative approach to cultivations based on minimum tillage across the whole farm".

Fox Fritillary Meadow nature reserve and Site of Special Scientific Interest is located to the north of the village. The reserve is managed by Suffolk Wildlife Trust and is a major site within East Anglia for snake's-head fritillary (Fritillaria meleagris).
