= Pettaugh =

Village in Suffolk, England

Coordinates: 52.191°N 1.167°E

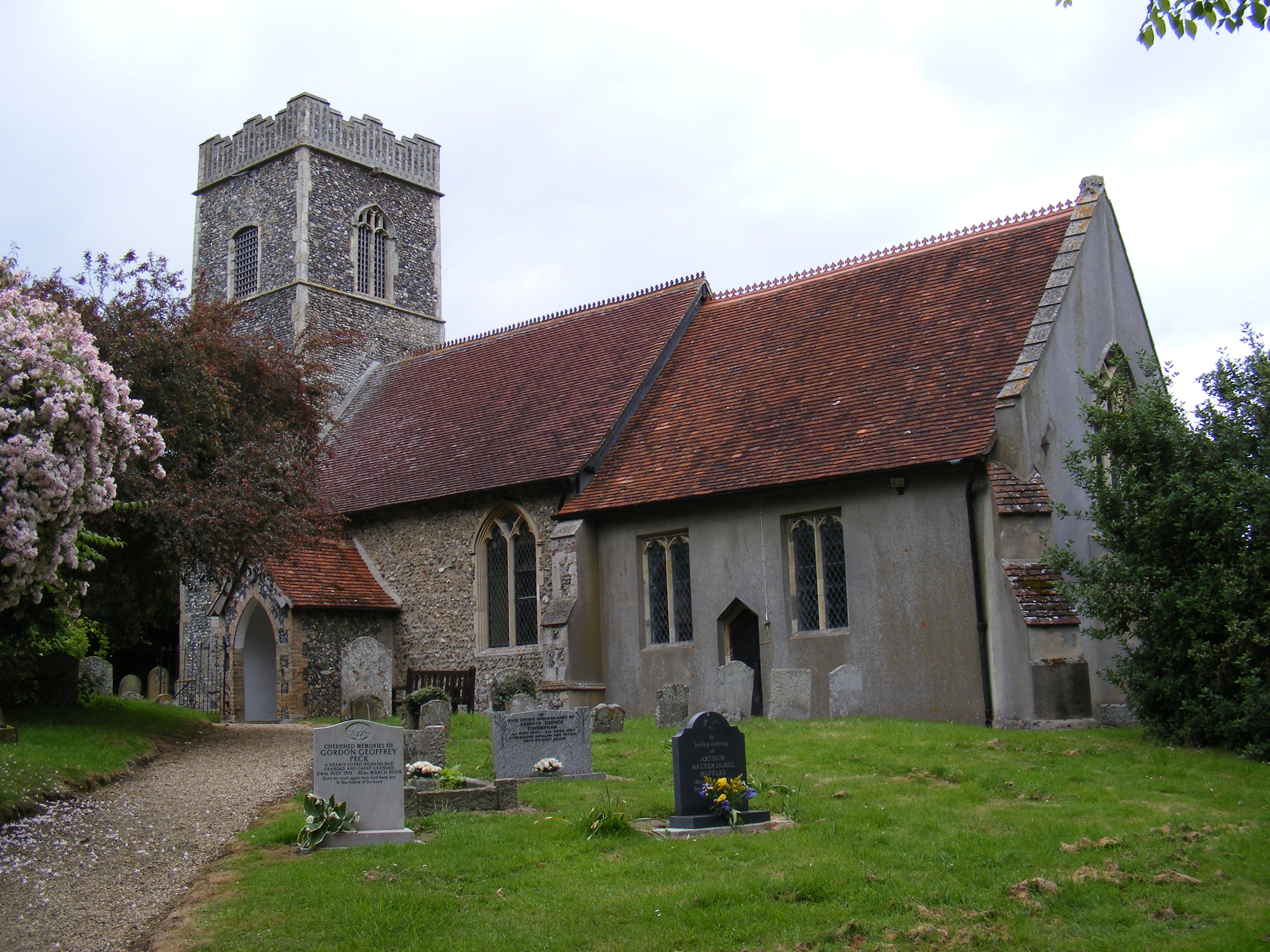
- St Catherine's Church, Pettaugh

- Location within Suffolk
- Population: 207 (2011)
- District: Mid Suffolk
- Shire county: Suffolk
- Region: East
- Country: England
- Sovereign state: United Kingdom
- Post town: Stowmarket
- Postcode district: IP14
- Dialling code: 01473
- UK Parliament: Central Suffolk and North Ipswich

Pettaugh is a village and civil parish located within the district council area of Mid Suffolk, England.

It is a small village of a little over 200 inhabitants in 85 households, 10 miles north of Ipswich and 2 1/2 miles south of Debenham, in the county of Suffolk. It is in a rural location surrounded by farmland, at the junction of the A1120 (Stowmarket to Yoxford) and the Coddenham to Debenham roads.

An aerial view of Pettaugh shows a few houses surrounded on all sides by a patchwork of farm fields. Years ago the fields may have been smaller, with lots more hedges, but farm fields surrounding the village is probably the way it's been for a very long time. The village sign reflects this – it features a farmer with his horse-drawn plough, working the farmland around Pettaugh, an anvil, indicating the existence of a blacksmith in the village, essential to farming in the days of horse-drawn ploughs, and the windmill which stood at the centre of the village. Thus are the main occupations of Pettaugh residents of 'yesteryear' represented – farming, smithing and milling the grain, mostly working very close to home. Today, residents of Pettaugh commute to nearby towns to work – to Debenham, Ipswich, Bury St Edmunds, and even by train to London; very few earn a living in or near to the village. Even the children catch buses or are driven by parents to schools in Stonham Aspal, Debenham, Helmingham, etc. Occupations may have changed but Pettaugh thrives, at the heart of beautiful Suffolk countryside.

History

The place-name 'Pettaugh' is first attested in the Domesday Book of 1086, where it appears as Petehaga and Pettehaga. The name means 'Peota's enclosure'.

The medieval parish church of St Catherine was renovated in 1861 and is a grade II* listed building.
