= Harleston, Suffolk =

Village in Suffolk, England

Coordinates: 52.202°N 0.945°E

Harleston
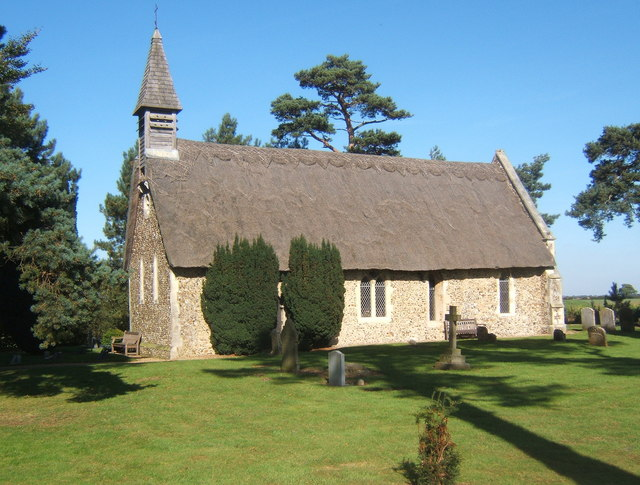
- Church of St Augustine

- Location within Suffolk
- Area: 4.706 km^{2} (1.817 sq mi)
- Population: 227 (2021 census)
  - Density: 48/km^{2} (120/sq mi)
- OS grid reference: TM 012600
- District: Mid Suffolk
- Shire county: Suffolk
- Region: East
- Country: England
- Sovereign state: United Kingdom
- Post town: STOWMARKET
- Postcode district: IP14
- Dialling code: 01449

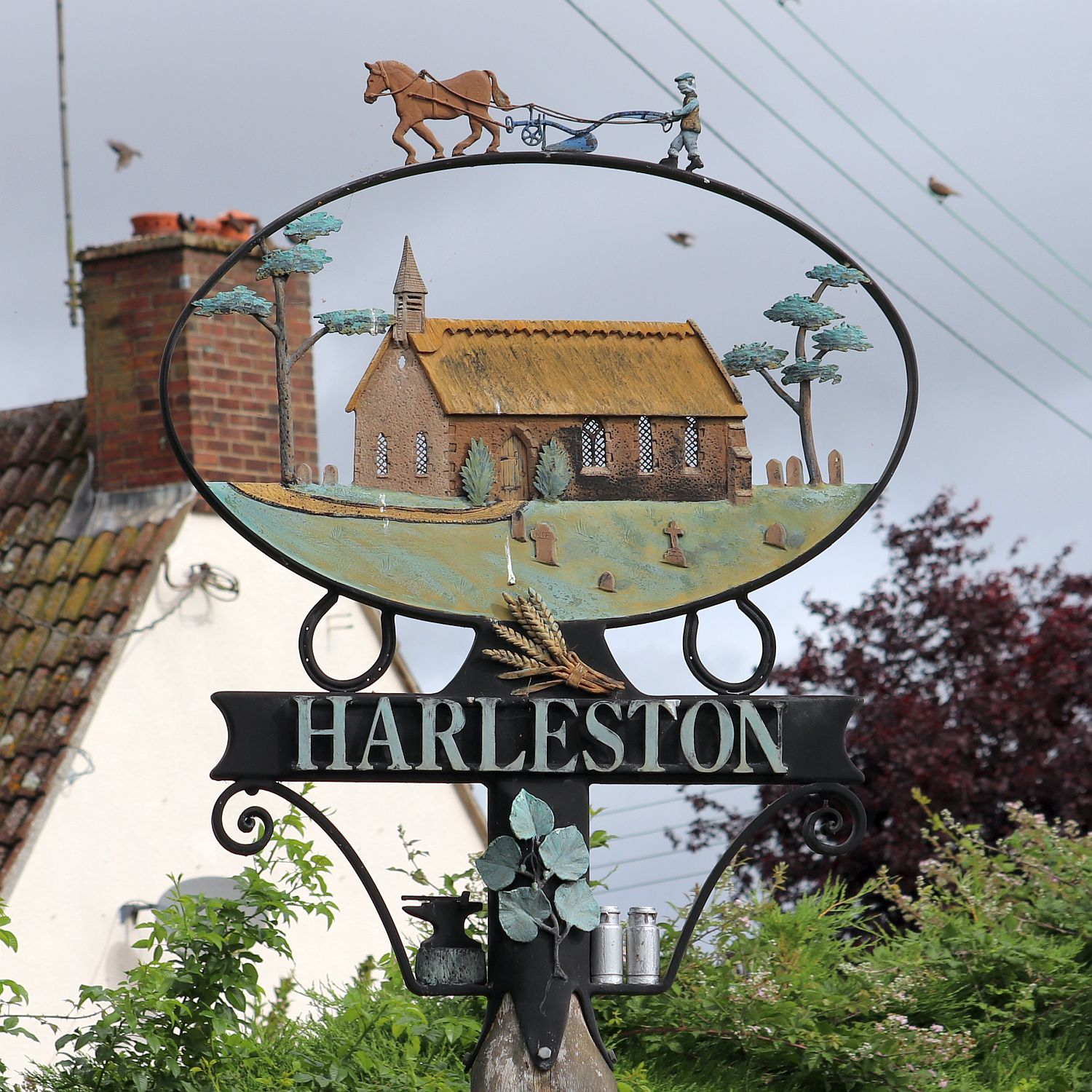
Harleston Village Sign

Harleston is a village and civil parish in the Mid Suffolk district of Suffolk, England, just south of the Haughley Bends on the A14. It is located between the villages of Shelland and Onehouse, about 3 miles (4.8 km) west of Stowmarket. In 2021 the parish had a population of 227.

The parish church of St Augustine is a Grade I listed building. Originally a Norman church, with an extant 11th century doorway, it was largely restored in 1860.

== Notable residents ==
- Samantha Harvey (1993- ), musician born in the village
