= Gosbeck =

Village in Suffolk, England

Coordinates: 52.15770°N 1.14814°E

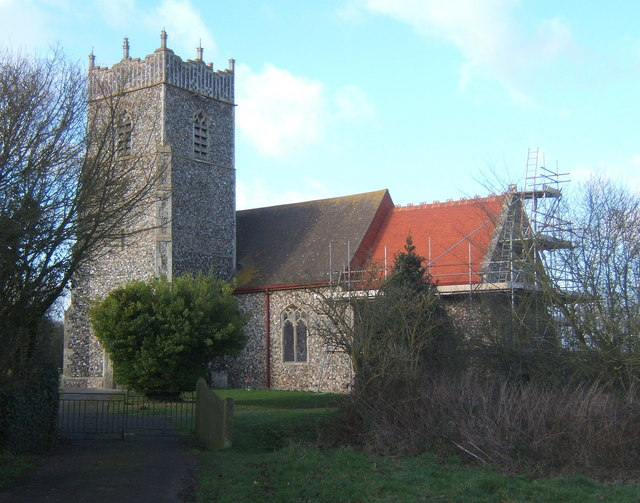
- Church of St Mary, Gosbeck

- Location within Suffolk
- Population: 220 (2005); 236 (2011)
- District: Mid Suffolk
- Shire county: Suffolk
- Region: East
- Country: England
- Sovereign state: United Kingdom
- Post town: Ipswich
- Postcode district: IP6
- Police: Suffolk
- Fire: Suffolk
- Ambulance: East of England

Gosbeck is a village and civil parish in the Mid Suffolk district of Suffolk in eastern England. Located around five miles north of Ipswich, in 2005 its population was 220.

The parish contains Gosbeck Wood, an ancient woodland and SSSI.
