= Debenham High School =

Location
- Gracechurch Street; Debenham, Suffolk, IP14 6BL; England; 52°13′26″N 1°10′16″E

Information
- Type: Private
- Religious affiliation: Church of England
- Established: 1964
- Department for Education URN: 136416 Tables
- Ofsted: Reports
- Headteacher: Simon Martin
- Gender: Coeducational
- Age: 11 to 16
- Enrolment: 650
- Houses: Austen Nelson Da Vinci Owens Curie
- Website: http://www.debenhamhigh.co.uk/

Debenham High Schools is a secondary school located in the village of Debenham in Suffolk, UK. The school accepts students who are between 11 and 16 years old and live in the catchment. Any spare places are then allocated to students outside of the catchment.

== History ==
The school was first opened as a Modern School in 1964, originally designed to cater for 250 students. The school primarily accepted students who were not offered places at the local grammar school. Before the school was built these students would have been taught in the local village schools of "Debenham, Stonham Aspal or at Framlingham".

The introduction of Comprehensive education in Suffolk, resulted in an expansion of the school and Debenham Modern School became Debenham High School in 1979.

== Former headteachers ==
- Arthur Holifield was appointed the first Headmaster of the school and he appointed the first eleven teachers to the school.
- Angela McClelland was Headteacher in 1983.
- Michael Crawshaw was Headteacher in 1989 to 2012. In 2006 he was awarded an OBE for services to education.
- Julia Upton was Headteacher in 2012 to 2020.
- As of 2020 Simon Martin is Headteacher.
