= Old Newton with Dagworth =

Civil parish in Suffolk, England

Coordinates: 52.218°N 0.995°E

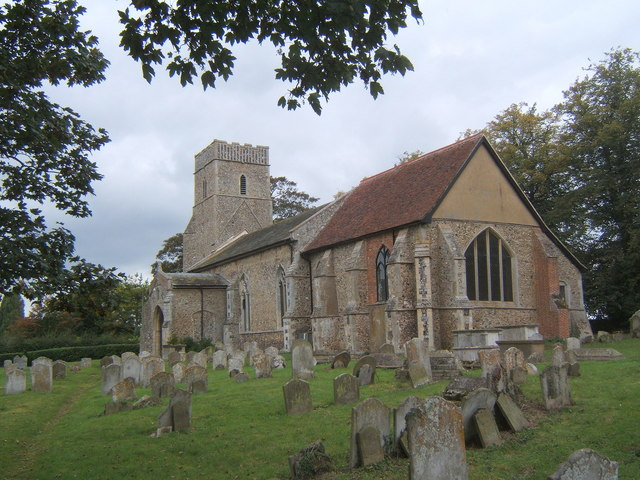
- Old Newton church

- Location within Suffolk
- Population: 1,050 (2005); 1,211 (2011) inc Gipping
- District: Mid Suffolk
- Shire county: Suffolk
- Region: East
- Country: England
- Sovereign state: United Kingdom
- Post town: Stowmarket
- Postcode district: IP14
- Police: Suffolk
- Fire: Suffolk
- Ambulance: East of England

Old Newton with Dagworth is a civil parish in the Mid Suffolk district of Suffolk, England. The parish contains the village of Old Newton, as well as the hamlets of Brown Street, Dagworth and Ward Green. In 2005 its population was 1,050. The parish shares a parish council with neighbouring Gipping.
