= Mickfield =

Village in Suffolk, England

Coordinates: 52.212°N 1.127°E

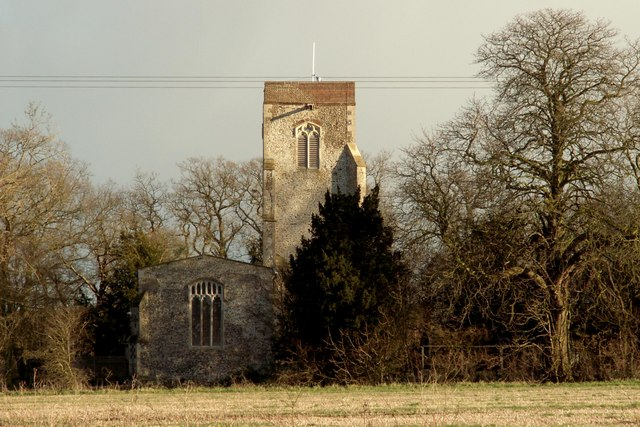
- St. Andrew's church, Mickfield

- Location within Suffolk
- Population: 200 (2005); 231 (2011)
- District: Mid Suffolk
- Shire county: Suffolk
- Region: East
- Country: England
- Sovereign state: United Kingdom
- Post town: Stowmarket
- Postcode district: IP14
- Police: Suffolk
- Fire: Suffolk
- Ambulance: East of England

Mickfield is a village and civil parish in the Mid Suffolk district of Suffolk in eastern England. Located around five miles north-east of Stowmarket, in 2005 its population was 200.

The Church of St Andrew was made redundant in the late 1970s and was allowed to fall into disrepair. The building has now been restored by the ACT (Anglia Church Trust) and is being used by the community. The small brethren gospel hall was demolished in 2009, after 104 years, on completion of the new church building, Mickfield Evangelical Church. No longer known as a brethren church, the group are now affiliated with the FIEC (Fellowship of Independent Evangelical Churches).
