= Old Newton =

Village in Suffolk, England

Coordinates: 52.22294°N 1.00183°E

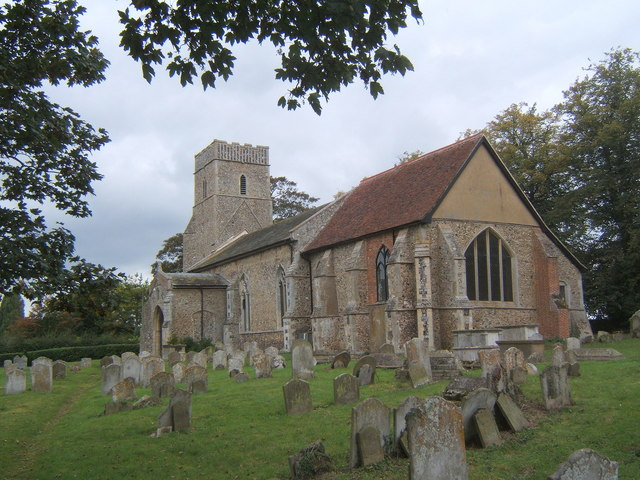
- Old Newton church

- Location within Suffolk
- Population: 809 (2018 estimate of 'built up area only)
- Civil parish: Old Newton with Dagworth
- District: Mid Suffolk
- Shire county: Suffolk
- Region: East
- Country: England
- Sovereign state: United Kingdom
- Police: Suffolk
- Fire: Suffolk
- Ambulance: East of England

Old Newton is a village in the civil parish of Old Newton with Dagworth, in the Mid Suffolk district of Suffolk, England. The village is situated around two miles north of Stowmarket, to the east of the junction of the Great Eastern Main Line and the Ipswich to Ely Line. Until the Beeching Axe it was served by Haughley railway station. In 2018 it had an estimated population of 809.
