= Willisham =

Village in Suffolk, England

Coordinates: 52.1198°N 1.0136°E

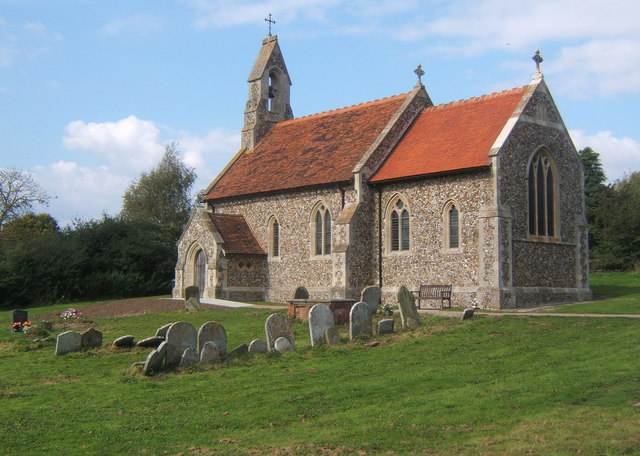
- St Mary's Church, Willisham

- Location within Suffolk
- Population: 362 (2011)
- OS grid reference: TM070506
- District: Mid-Suffolk
- Shire county: Suffolk
- Region: East
- Country: England
- Sovereign state: United Kingdom
- Post town: IPSWICH
- Postcode district: IP8
- Dialling code: 01473
- Police: Suffolk
- Fire: Suffolk
- Ambulance: East of England
- UK Parliament: Central Suffolk and North Ipswich

Willisham is a small village in the suburbs of the county town of Ipswich, Suffolk. The small parish village has been present since the 11th century and was included in the Domesday Book. During the 18th century the village was once home to wheat and barley farmers. During the 20th century the village has gained new homes with the local authority building at Fiske Pightle, and private dwellings in the cul-de-sac of North Acres being built in 1965/1966. In the year 2000 the village had 9 new houses built down Tye Lane. The village post office was renovated into a house 8 years ago. The 2011 census recorded a population of 362 people.

During the 1870s Willisham was described as:

"a parish in Bosmere district, Suffolk; 3 miles W of Claydon r. station, and 7 NW of Ipswich."

== History ==
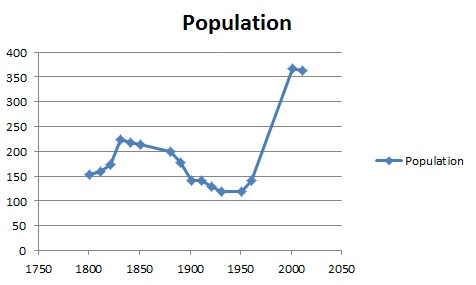
The total population of Willisham recorded by the census from 1801–2011

The earliest records of Willisham date back to 1066 when it was known as Willaluesham. It was recorded in the Domesday Book as part of the hundred of Bosmere and had a value of £4.6 to the lord. At this time the village consisted of 20 households which is counted by the heads of family, meaning that the actual population is likely to be 5 times higher.

The origin of the name Willisham is stated on the parish council website as being: "derived from Wiglaf Meadow or Enclosure. The name Wiglaf occurs in Beowulf." This claim is basedon documentation dating from 1198. Other names it has previously known as include Wylavesham, Willavesham and Wylewesham.

During 1884 the area underwent boundary changes moving certain areas of Offton and Nettlestead. However Willisham did gain some of Offton.

In 1901 the population was 141, and the parish covered 940 acres.

== Geography ==
Willisham is located 11.4 km north west of Ipswich, 8.1 km south of Stowmarket and 104.4 km away from London.

=== Rivers ===
To the east of Willisham lies the River Gipping which enabled travel further up into Suffolk notably by the Danes in the year 860. To the west of Willisham lies the River Brett which later goes on to join the River Stour.

== Demography ==
=== Religion ===
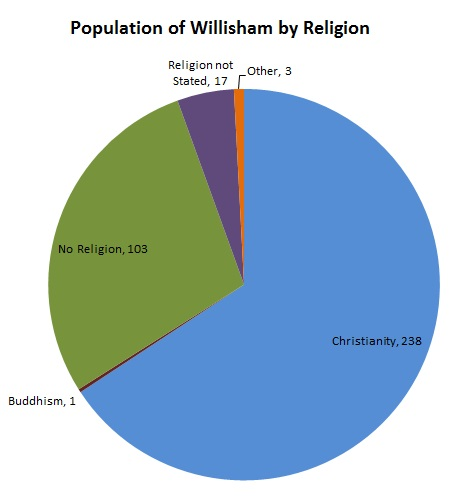
Pie chart depicting data collected from the 2011 census on the religious beliefs of residents in Willisham.

According to the 2011 census, 65.7% of the population is Christian with the second largest group being of no religion at 28.5% of the total population. 4.7% of the population did not declare their religious beliefs, 0.3% of the population is Buddhist and 0.8% are categorised as other.

=== Ethnic groups ===
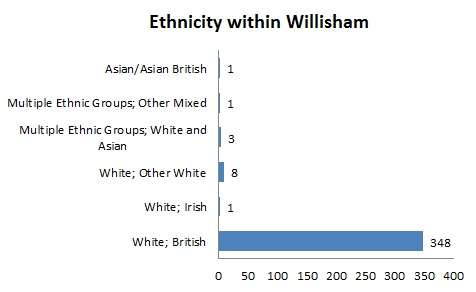
Bar graph showing the ethnic composition of Willisham using data from the 2011 census.

The 2011 census data shows that Willisham is predominantly a White British area of residence with 96.1% of the population describing themselves as this. The rest of the population is made up of much smaller ethnic groups which are; Other White at 2.2%, White and Asian at 0.8%, Asian British at 0.3%, White Irish at 0.3% and Other Mixed at 0.3%.

== Economy ==
The 1881 census recorded 34.7% of the population working within the agricultural sector and 43.2% of the population are recorded as being in an unknown occupation. 6.3% worked and dealt with houses and furniture, 5.3% worked with general or unspecified commodities and 4.2% worked in unspecified occupations.

The 2011 census showed the largest occupational group within Willisham to be managerial roles with 18% of the economically active population belonging to this category. Professional occupations is the second largest group within Willisham constituting 15% of the economically active population. The lowest occupational group within Willisham is the sales and customer service occupation with only 7% being part of this sector.

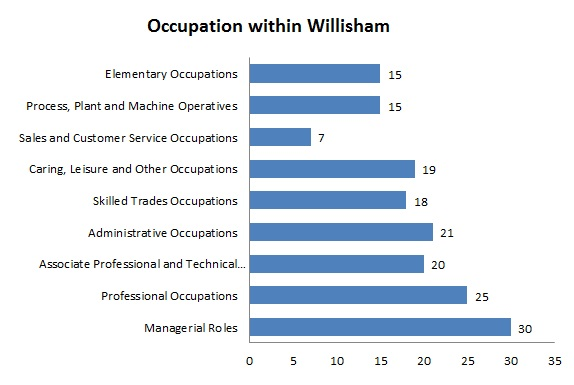
Bar graph depicting occupational roles within Willisham using statistics taken from the 2011 census.

== Landmarks ==
=== Tye Farmhouse ===
Tye Farmhouse is a grade II listed building situated at the bottom of Tye Lane. Dating back to the mid 16th century it contains alterations from the mid 20th century. It has been a listed building since 24 January 1986.

=== Long Meadow ===
Long Meadow is a grade II listed building located on Holly Road. Dating back to the early 16th century it has undergone modifications during the early 17th and mid 20th centuries. It has been a listed building since 24 January 1986.

== Transport ==
=== Major Roads ===
The nearest major road to Willisham is the A14 which starts at the Port of Felixstowe and continues to the Catthorpe Interchange.

=== Airports ===
The closest airport to Willisham is Norwich International Airport which is 44.9 miles away, this airport runs flights to domestic as well as international destinations. The next nearest airport is Cambridge Airport which is 49.7 miles away. Willisham is also very close to Wattisham Airfield which is operated by the British Army after being closed by the RAF as an airforce base in 1993.

=== Ports ===
The Port of Felixstowe is the nearest port to Willisham and is the UK's busiest container port. Willisham is also close to Harwich International Port which mainly provides ferry services.

== Religious Sites ==
=== St.Mary's Church ===
Located on top of Strawberry Hill, the present day building was constructed in 1878 on the site of the previous church, the remnants of which were in part used to construct the outer layer of the current church. The Domesday book records a church being present in Willisham which would suggest that some form of Christian worship has been present in this area since at least the 11th century.

== Sources ==
- Willisham at Picturesofengland.com
