= Shelland =

Village in Suffolk, England

Coordinates: 52.205054°N 0.930576°E

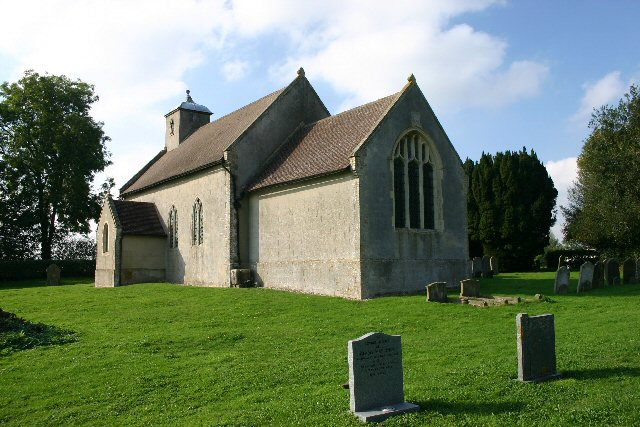
- Church of King Charles the Martyr, Shelland

- Location within Suffolk
- District: Mid-Suffolk
- Shire county: Suffolk
- Region: East
- Country: England
- Sovereign state: United Kingdom
- Post town: Stowmarket
- Postcode district: IP14
- Dialling code: 01449

Shelland is a small village and civil parish located just off the A14, 4 miles west of Stowmarket in Suffolk, England.

Shelland consists of roughly 10 houses, a church and Shelland Green. At the 2001 census, the village had a population of 39. At the 2011 Census the population was still less than 100 and was included in the civil parish of Rattlesden. Shelland's name is unique and derives from "Shelf land" as it is situated on a "shelf" that overlooks the village of Buxhall.

The mediaeval parish church, effectively rebuilt in 1767, is a grade II* listed building. It is unique in that it is the only church in the UK with a regularly used barrel organ. It is also one of only five dedicated to "King Charles the Martyr" (Charles I).
