= Combs, Suffolk =

Village in Suffolk, England

Coordinates: 52.17°N 0.987°E

Combs
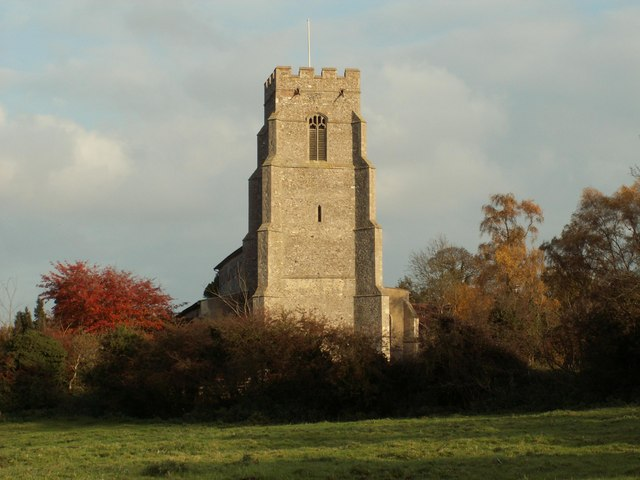
- Church of St Mary

- Location within Suffolk
- Population: 852 (2011)
- District: Mid Suffolk
- Shire county: Suffolk
- Region: East
- Country: England
- Sovereign state: United Kingdom
- Post town: Stowmarket
- Postcode district: IP14

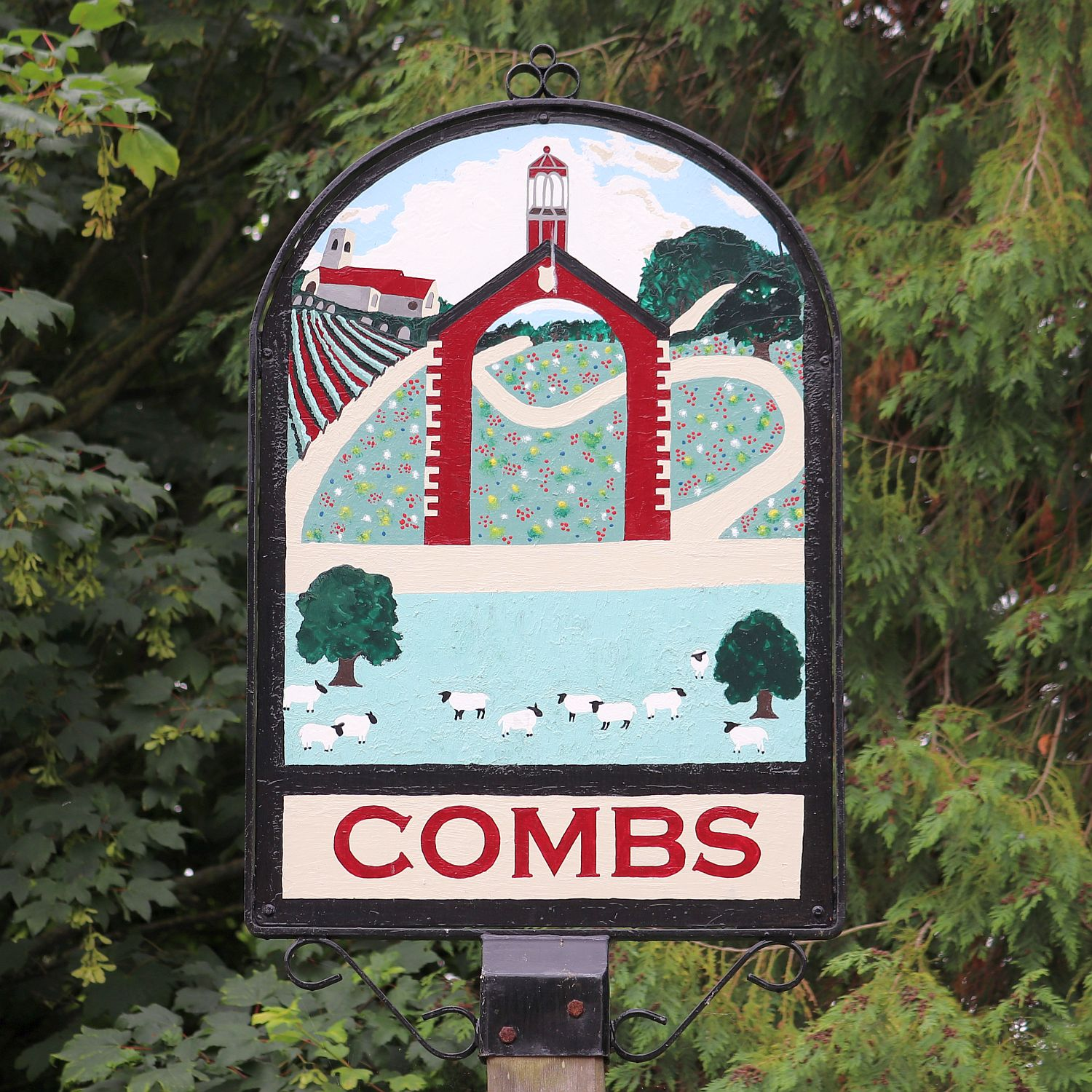
Combs village sign, Suffolk

Combs is a village and civil parish in the English county of Suffolk. It is also located directly to the south of Stowmarket, with a half-mile (800m) of glacial valley known locally as 'Slough'.

== History ==
There are several interesting historic buildings including the old village school, the tannery, and the former model farm that has now been developed as dwellings. Combs Post Office is now a private dwelling, but the original postbox is still there. The building is Grade II listed.

According to White's History, Gazetteer and Directory of Suffolk published in 1885, the village had 1,174 inhabitants at the 1881 census, although this does include Combs Ford, which nowadays is regarded as being a suburb of Stowmarket. White's also notes that at that time the Combs Tannery was owned by Messrs. Webb and Sons, who carried on the tanning of leather, manufacture of glove and gaiter leather, leather machine bands and leather hose. At that time in 1885 the Tannery employed 150 persons. It also states that an artesian well had been sunk on the site at a depth of 895 feet (273 m) and a diameter of ten inches (250 mm) at the surface. Many interesting geological specimens were extracted and deposited in Ipswich Museum.

The village was struck by an F1/T2 tornado on 23 November 1981, as part of the record-breaking nationwide tornado outbreak on that day.

== Churches ==
=== Combs Chapel ===
The following is from the United Reformed Churches website:

Combs was a rural backwater where Dissenters met hiding from the authorities. A house church was established there in 1696. In 1719, the people of Combs helped to form the Independent Chapel, Stowmarket.

Combs Chapel was one of seven causes under the direction of the Independent Chapel, Stowmarket with a common membership, Deacons’ (then Elders’) and Church Meetings. It was an extremely effective way of ministering to people living in five hundred square miles of Suffolk. The chapel was built after folk had been meeting in a local barn since 1862. The big and grand occasions were held in Stowmarket.

The original chapel was replaced with a prefabricated building in 1969, and when that began to deteriorate, with most people journeying the two miles (3.2 km) to Stowmarket United Reformed Church, it was decided to cease having a separate building within the village.

A Service of Thanksgiving for its Life and Witness was held on Sunday, 11 October 1992. Non-conformist church life continues in the village somewhat as it did in 1686 – in people’s homes, with a monthly coffee morning and an occasional service and event. The former congregation, with others from the village, fully participates in the life of the Stowmarket town church.

=== St Mary's Parish Church, Combs ===
The Church of St Mary is an ancient structure, consisting of a nave, chancel, aisles, and a square tower, in which are four bells.

==== 1086 ====
The Domesday Survey mentions the existence of 'one church at Combas'. No evidence of this building remains but it shows that there has been a church here, and almost certainly on this spot, for maybe 1000 years.

==== 1300–1345 ====
From c.1300 to 1345 the core of much of the present church took shape. The west window of the south aisle dates from c.1300. The much restored chancel arch is of a similar date.

The north and south doorways are early 14th century, also the bold arches in the base of the tower suggest that it was begun about this time. Above these arches are carved the engrailed cross of the de Uffords, who were Lords of the Manor here from 1216 – 1381. Around 1330, or just after, the chancel took shape.

==== Fifteenth century ====
The 15th century. There was a great period of church building in Suffolk and here at Combs the nave, aisles and tower assumed their present appearance. The nave was heightened and received a new shallow-pitched roof. Its walls were pierced with elegant clerestory windows. The north and south aisles were altered and possibly extended. They were given their three-light perpendicular windows. The tower was also completed and received its belfry windows and parapet.

==== 1500 ====
The South porch was built of Tudor brick, although it received a new entrance arch in the 18th century.

==== Seventeenth century ====
Before the Reformation, the interior must have been a kaleidoscope of colour and carving, providing a host of visual aids to teach the faith to ordinary people who could not read and were not Latin scholars. In the mid 16th century much of this was removed by the reformers. The Puritans in 1640s destroyed a great deal more in their zeal to rid our churches of 'superstitious images and inscriptions'.

==== Nineteenth century ====
1851 The Census of Places of Worship taken this year records that the population of the parish was 1,148. On the census Sunday the morning congregation was 48+49 scholars whilst the afternoon congregation numbered 187+48 scholars. Holy Communion was celebrated four times a year with an average of 34 communicants.

1871 An explosion at the guncotton works at Stowmarket blew out much of the church's 15th century glass.

1885–1886 The church underwent a very thorough restoration to the designs of Herbert J Green of Norwich. The Society for the Protection of Ancient Monuments was consulted and the work was carried out very sensitively. The church was closed for 12 months, when services were held in the Board School or in a large marquee in the churchyard during summer months. The reopening service took place on 16 June 1886. The preacher in the morning service was Canon Samuel Garrett, vicar of St Margaret's Ipswich and the preacher in the evening service was Rev J C Girling, Rector of Coltishall, Norfolk.

==== Twentieth century ====
Much has been done over the past 100 years to keep this church intact. In 1943 the large candlesticks were given for use in the sanctuary and the two commandment panels were moved from the sanctuary niches to their present position at the west end of the church.

In 1952, the 15th century glass now in the south-east windows of the south aisle finally came back to Combs. A good amount of stained glass at St Mary's survived both the destruction of the Reformers and also the explosion at Stowmarket gun-cotton works in 1871. The hundreds of assorted fragments were stored in two wooden boxes in the church. The Archdeacon of Suffolk had them deposited in the Victoria and Albert Museum, where they were seen in 1939 by Miss Joan Howson, a stained glass expert from Putney, who offered to reassemble the fragments free of charge. This was delayed by the war years, when the glass was hidden away for safety in a mine at Portmadoc, North Wales and also delayed by a commission for Miss Howson to repair damaged windows at Westminster Abbey. The work was completed in 1952 and the glass was replaced in the two south aisle windows.

In 1963 the present organ was installed by William Boggis of Diss.

In 1995, through the generosity of Mr Clifford Cook, the western sections of the aisles were transformed by the building of a kitchen and toilet facilities on the north side and a vestry and meeting room on the south.
