= Little Finborough =

Village in Suffolk, England

Coordinates: 52.154°N 0.951°E

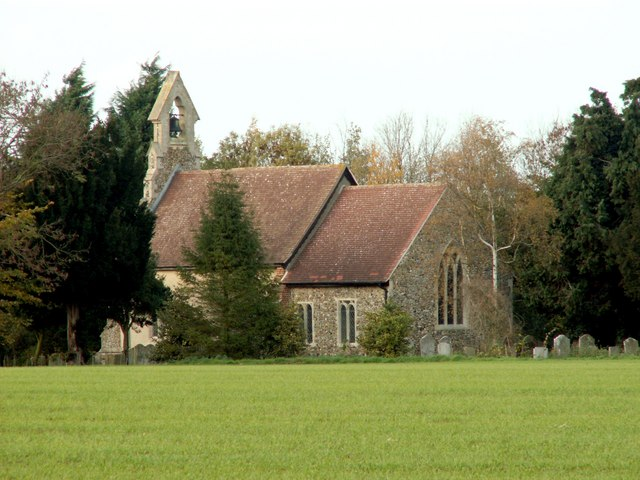
- St Mary's Church, Little Finborough

- Location within Suffolk
- Population: 50
- District: Mid Suffolk
- Shire county: Suffolk
- Region: East
- Country: England
- Sovereign state: United Kingdom
- Post town: Stowmarket
- Postcode district: IP14
- Dialling code: 01449

Little Finborough is a small village in Suffolk, England about 3.5 miles (6 km) south-west of Stowmarket. It neighbours the village Great Finborough. The settlement was formerly known as ‘Finborough Parva’ and is featured in the Domesday Book of 1086. Notable buildings include St Mary's Church and Little Finborough Hall.
