= Onehouse =

Village in Suffolk, England

Coordinates: 52.19°N 00.95°E

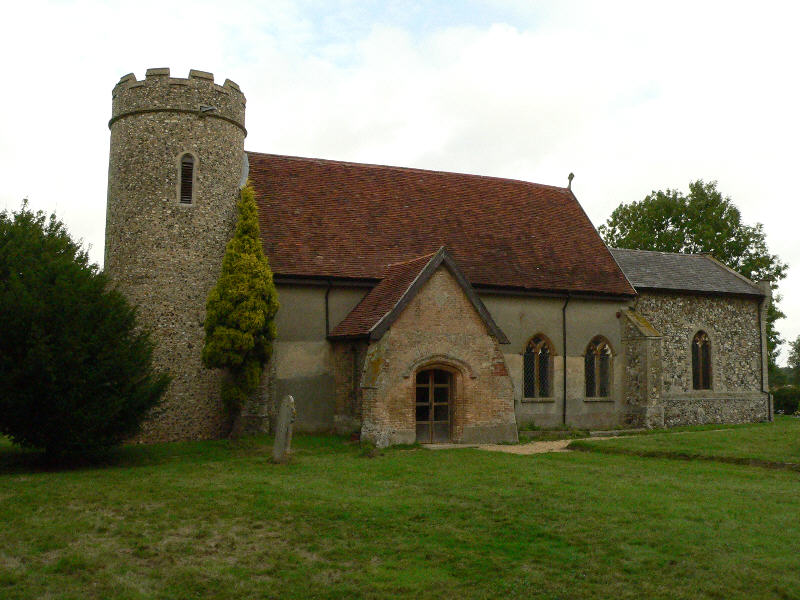
- Onehouse St John the Baptist

- Location within Suffolk
- Population: 810 (2011)
- Civil parish: Onehouse
- District: Mid Suffolk
- Shire county: Suffolk
- Region: East
- Country: England
- Sovereign state: United Kingdom
- Post town: Stowmarket
- Postcode district: IP14
- UK Parliament: Bury St Edmunds and Stowmarket

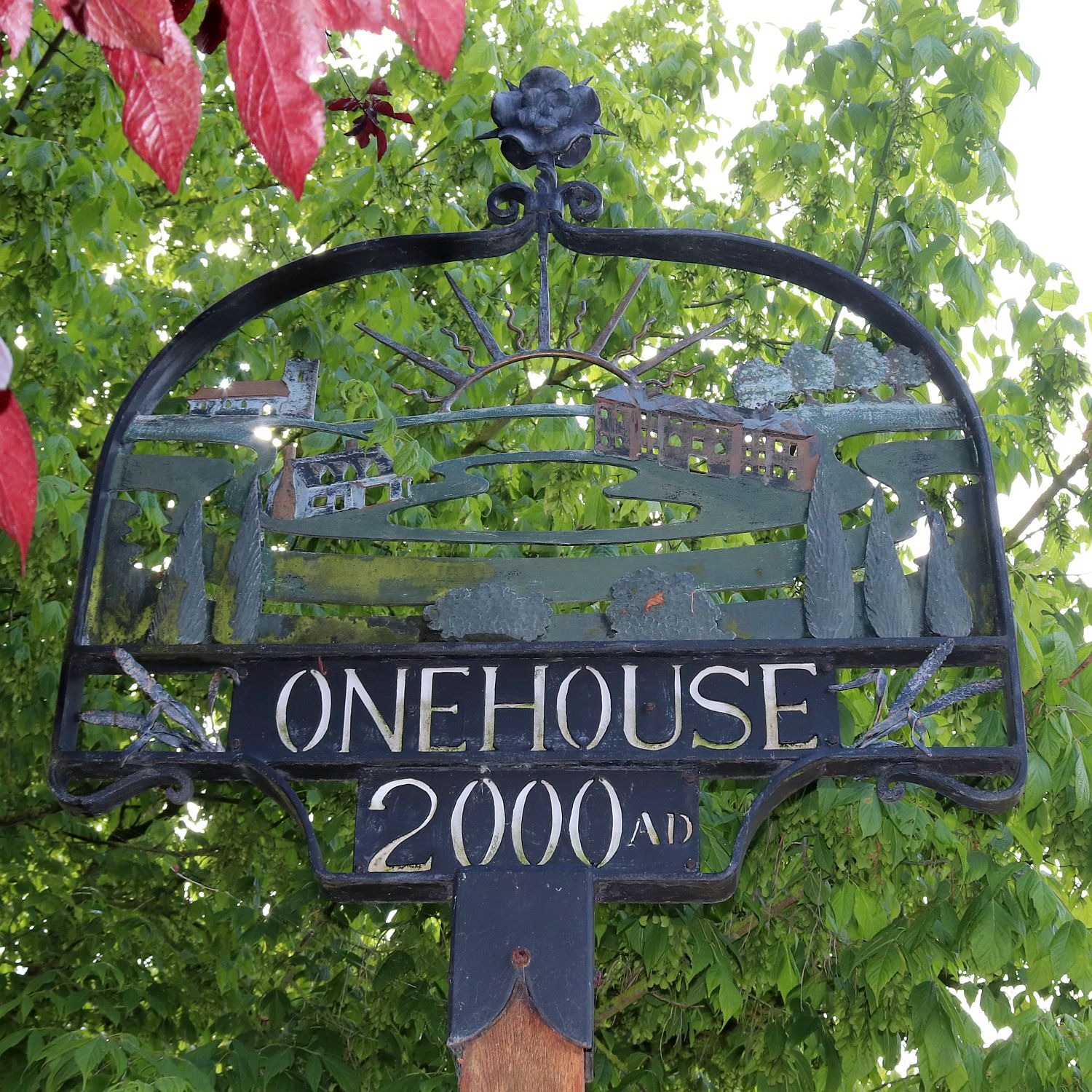
Onehouse Village Sign

Onehouse is a small village in the English county of Suffolk, about 3 miles west from the centre of Stowmarket near to the Golf Club. The population of the parish at the 2011 Census was 810.

Recorded in the Domesday Book of 1086 variously as "Aneus", "Anehus", "Anuhus" and "Anhus" (meaning a lonely cottage or house), today it is mainly modern housing for commuters with a few scattered older buildings.

Robert Drury was granted, in 1510, licence to crenellate his manors of Hansted Hall, Buknahams and Onhowshalle, Suff. There are three fragments of a moat around the site of Onehouse Hall, according to the Victoria County History. Homestead Moat, in good condition, comprises two water-filled arms and one dry arm. The remaining N. arm has been destroyed by farm buildings. The Hall was pulled down before 1847 (Copinger), probably in the mid C17 when the Callums (the Drury heirs) constructed Hardwick House. They seem to have destroyed the other two properties at this time.

The House of Industry was built in 1779 to serve the entire hundred of Stow (hundred). Later it became the Union Workhouse on Union Road (extreme east). Nearby is the Paupers' Graves, now a conservation area owned and maintained by the parish council.

Until the 1950s the village was a scattering of some dozen houses along Lower Road (to the south) and about 15 houses on Upper Road (to the north) with another 5 on Union Road leading to Stowmarket. By the late 1960s housing development had begun. With the major build of 150 houses in the 1970s Upper Road became Forest Road and the Northfield Estate came into being.

The village church, St John the Baptist, is one of 38 existing round-tower churches in Suffolk and was close to the Hall. It is in the fields midway between Lower and Upper Road and is a small flint, stone and brick structure, with a round tower containing two bells, close by the ancient site of Onehouse Hall. There was a church in Saxon times, as recorded in the Domesday Book, but the present church is thought to have been built during the Norman build and rebuild period following the Conquest. Archaeologists now date the earliest part of the building as of the 12th century. The round tower of the parish church has recently been restored.

== Notable people ==
- Charles Davy (1722–1797), Rector of Onehouse, miscellaneous author (Conjectural observations on the origin and progress of alphabetic writing, London 1772)
- Margaret Green, painter
- John Wark, Ipswich Town and Scotland footballer
- Trevor Whymark, Ipswich Town and England footballer
