= Winston, Suffolk =

Village in Suffolk, England

Coordinates: 52.208°N 1.193°E

Winston
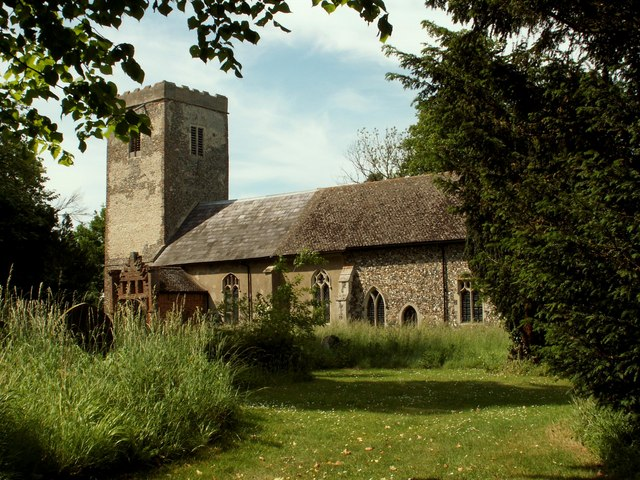
- St. Andrew's church, Winston

- Location within Suffolk
- Population: 159 (2011)
- District: Mid Suffolk
- Shire county: Suffolk
- Region: East
- Country: England
- Sovereign state: United Kingdom
- Post town: Stowmarket
- Postcode district: IP14
- Police: Suffolk
- Fire: Suffolk
- Ambulance: East of England

Winston is a village and civil parish in the Mid Suffolk district of Suffolk in eastern England. Located around 8 miles (13 km) east of Stowmarket, the 2011 Census showed that the population of the parish of Winston is 159. The parish also contains the settlements of Winston Green and Fenn Street. There is a church and an old school room, and every year there is a Winston Village Fete. A lot of the village of Winston is based around 14th Century Church, with multiple 16th Century cottages and farmhouses along church lane, showing the villages agricultural past, the area of Winston is still agricultural based with farms and fields all over the parish. Winston and the surrounding area is approximately 45m-50m above sea level making the area unlikely to flood, unless in exceptional circumstances. In the 1870s Winston was described as:

Winston, a parish, with a village, in Bosmere district, Suffolk; 1 mile SSE of Debenham, and 7 NE of Needham r. station.

== History ==
The parish of Winston first appears in the Domesday Book, written in 1066, stating that the population was "43.5 households (very large)". However the Domesday Book representation of the population is misleading, as the figure is based on heads of families so it may be up to 5 times more than the figure stated. The records show that from the first Census conducted in 1801 the population of Winston was 261. The population declined after the 1851 census, with almost everyone in the village at the time working on the land, it may be possible that due to the Industrial Revolution, Winston saw many of the residents move to local large towns like Ipswich. The population in Ipswich boomed during this period as many workers came from the rural area to the industrial area in search of more money and a better life. The parish of Winston contains 5 listed buildings, all of which are listed as grade II by English Heritage, mainly dating from the 16th and 17th Century.

According to the genealogy of the Suffolk family of Bacon, one Grimald, or Grimaldus, a relative of William de Warenne, who came to England in 1066. The Bacon family resided in the area around Winston, many birth and death records show that in the period of c.1475 to c.1640 the Bacon family lived in or around the area of Winston, which once had an estate which was handed down through the family. There is a War Memorial in Winston dating from 1923, it bears the names of 5 men lost in the First World War and 2 men lost in the Second World War.

== Employment ==
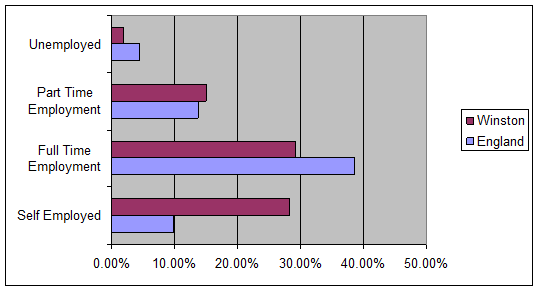
A bar chart comparing the number of people in a type of work in Winston and the whole of England

The 1831 Census showed that around 87% of people living within the parish of Winston worked in agriculture and by 1881 this was down to 53% working in agriculture. This shows a decline in employment in agriculture at the same time as a decline in population in the Parish. Around 13% of women living with Winston were enrolled in Domestic Services and Offices, the rest of female occupation being unknown or they did not have an occupation. The present day employment figures differ a lot from those in the 19th Century, for example only 5.1% of the population of Winston work in agriculture. Winston also has a low number of unemployed, the figure stands at 1.9%, which is well below 4.4% unemployed on average throughout England. Winston also has a very high percentage of residents that are self-employed at 28.3% as of 2011, much higher than the 9.8% average for the whole of England

== Church ==
The local parish church called St Andrews was founded in around the 15th century. With extensions built during the 14th and 16th centuries, while being heavily restored during the 19th century, however it retains a lot of the original architecture, the church is listed as a grade II listed building. Records show that St Andrews church was used for many burials starting at around 1550. The last mention of the use of the school building in Winston is in 1897, where a letter was written concerning Winston school.

== Travel ==
The nearest station to the village of Winston is in Stowmarket, which is 11 miles away or roughly a 25-minute drive from the centre of Winston. The station at Stowmarket is on the main line between Norwich and London. Winston lies just off the A1120 which is a direct road to Stowmarket, the nearest market town. The Village of Debenham nearby provides the local primary and secondary schools, while also providing local police and fire station, the centre of Debenham is approximately 1.5 miles from the centre of Winston, making it an easy place to get to. The nearest major town is Ipswich which is 30-minute drive and just under 13 miles to the centre of Ipswich from the village of Winston. This gives the residents of Winston options for a range of different services with two large towns in close proximity, making it an ideal place to live if you want to be in the countryside yet not in complete isolation. Winston is a 1-hour 30-minute drive from the nearest major airport which is Stansted and a 2 hours 20-minute drive from the airport of Heathrow. The centre of London is a 2:30-hour drive from the centre of the village of Winston, this makes the village of Winston easily within driving range of the biggest metropolitan area in the UK.
