= Gipping =

Village in Suffolk, England

Coordinates: 52.22773°N 1.03206°E

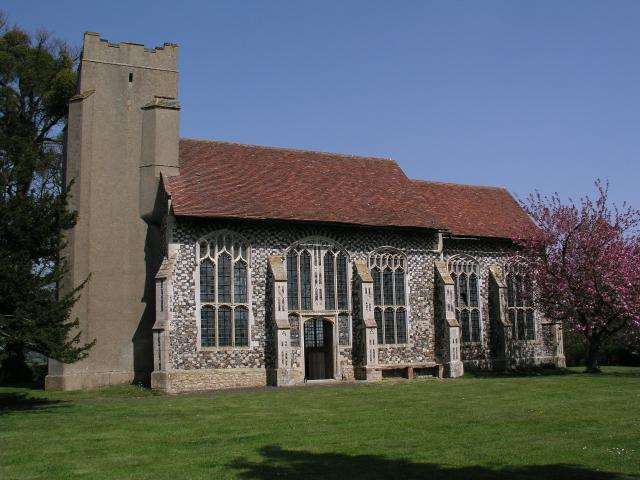
- Chapel of St Nicholas

- Location within Suffolk
- Population: 80 (2005)
- District: Mid Suffolk
- Shire county: Suffolk
- Region: East
- Country: England
- Sovereign state: United Kingdom
- Post town: Stowmarket
- Postcode district: IP14
- Dialling code: 01449
- Police: Suffolk
- Fire: Suffolk
- Ambulance: East of England

Gipping is a village and civil parish in the Mid Suffolk district of Suffolk in eastern England. Located around three miles north north-east of Stowmarket, in 2005 its population was 80. At the 2011 Census the population remained less than 100 and was included in the civil parish of Old Newton with Dagworth.

The parish contains Great Gipping Wood, an ancient woodland and SSSI, whilst the River Gipping runs through it. It shares a parish council with neighbouring Old Newton with Dagworth.

== Gipping Hall ==
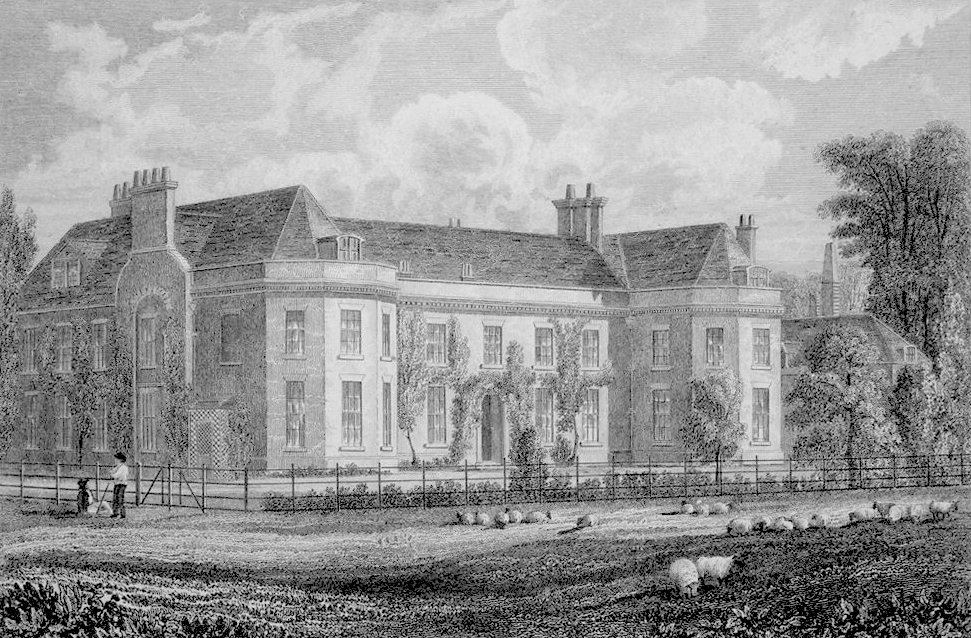
Gipping Hall picture by Henry Davy, 1824. The hall was demolished in the 1850s.

For many years the village was linked with the family descended from Walter Tirel, the cousin of William Rufus. Sir James Tyrrell who allegedly confessed to murdering the Princes in the Tower under Richard III and was executed by order of Henry VII in 1502 for treason. He built a chapel in the village in the 1470s, which is still there.
