= Buxhall =

Village in Suffolk, England

Coordinates: 52.183181°N 0.926567°E

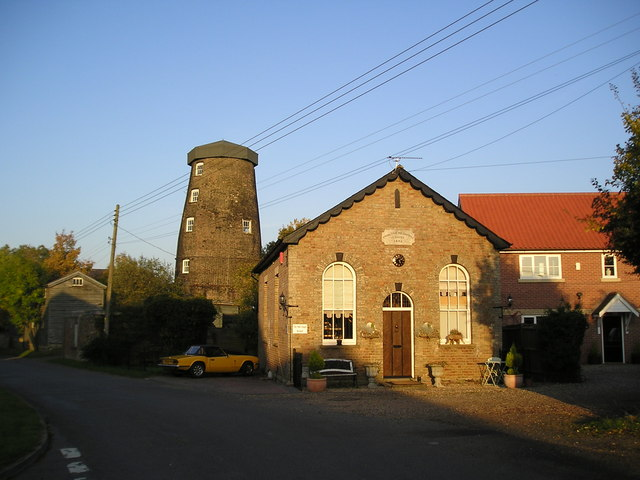
- The Primitive Methodist Chapel and windmill

- Location within Suffolk
- Interactive map of Buxhall
- Population: 475 (2011)
- OS grid reference: TL9957
- District: Mid Suffolk
- Shire county: Suffolk
- Region: East
- Country: England
- Sovereign state: United Kingdom
- Post town: Stowmarket
- Postcode district: IP14
- Police: Suffolk
- Fire: Suffolk
- Ambulance: East of England

Buxhall is a village and a civil parish in the Mid Suffolk district, in the county of Suffolk, England. The nearest town is Stowmarket. It is home to a public house, St Mary's Church, Buxhall Windmill, and a village recreation ground with children's play area.

The antiquarian Walter Arthur Copinger published his History of the parish of Buxhall in the county of Suffolk which featured twenty four illustrations by William Ayliffe.
