= Debenham =

Village in Suffolk, England

Coordinates: 52.224°N 1.180°E

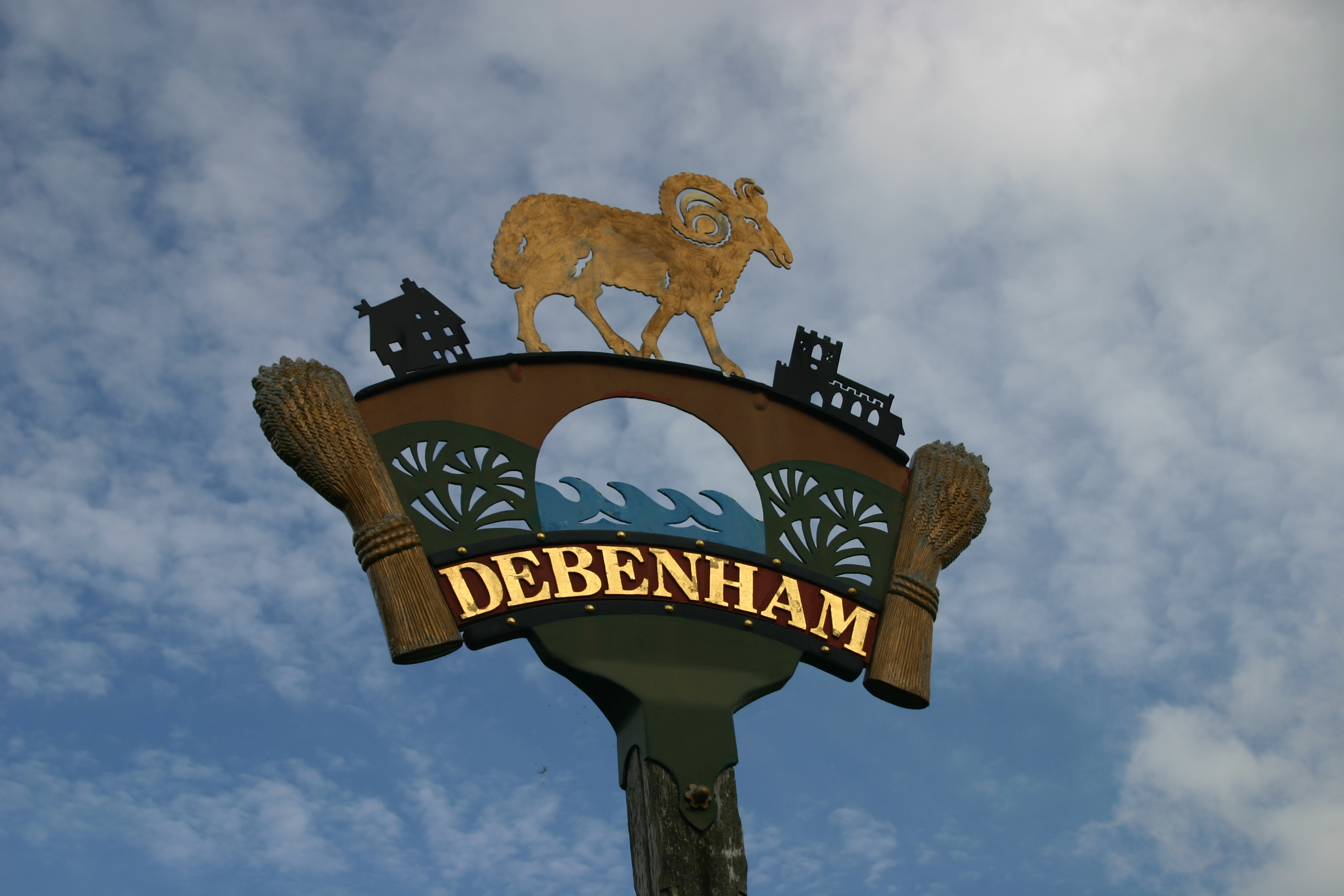
- Debenham village sign

- Location within Suffolk
- Area: 16.89 km^{2} (6.52 sq mi)
- Population: 2,210 (2011) inc Winston & Aspall
  - Density: 131/km^{2} (340/sq mi)
- OS grid reference: TM173632
- District: Mid Suffolk
- Shire county: Suffolk
- Region: East
- Country: England
- Sovereign state: United Kingdom
- Post town: Stowmarket
- Postcode district: IP14
- Dialling code: 01728
- Police: Suffolk
- Fire: Suffolk
- Ambulance: East of England
- UK Parliament: Central Suffolk and North Ipswich

Debenham is a village and civil parish located 11 miles (18 km) north of Ipswich in the Mid Suffolk district of Suffolk, England. The River Deben rises in the parish, and flows along a prolonged ford through the village.

== History ==
In 1086, Debenham was a comparatively large village of 69 households in the hundred of Claydon.

In 1991, Prince Alexandre of Belgium was married in the village, however the marriage was kept a secret until 1998.

At the 2001 census the parish population was recorded as 1,728 increasing to 2,210 at the 2011 census though including the parishes of Aspall and Winston. It is currently estimated to be 2,274.

In November 2020, filming on the thriller movie Confession started at Debenham Church. The film stars Colm Meaney. St Mary's Arts Exhibition started in 1976 and runs each year during the summer.

== Village facilities ==
Village amenities and facilities include a post office, library, pharmacy, doctors' surgery, osteopath, a police station and fire station, cafes, a supermarket, a newsagents, green grocers, butcher, baker, florist and antiques dealer, and hardware and pottery outlets as well as a veterinary practice. There are currently two pubs, the Woolpack and the Debenham Lion.

=== Football ===
The local football club, Debenham LC is based at the village's leisure centre and plays in Division One of the Eastern Counties League.

=== Schools ===
Debenham High School first opened in 1964 on Gracechurch Street and caters for 650 pupils aged 11–16. Debenham also has a primary school, Sir Robert Hitcham CEVAP School, for ages 5–11 on School Corner.
