= List of windmills in Suffolk =

A list of all windmills and windmill sites which lie in the current ceremonial county of Suffolk.

Extant (red) and former (blue) windmills in Suffolk.
1 Aldeburgh, 2 Bardwell, 3 Barnham, 4 Blundeston, 5 Bungay, 6 Burgh, 7 Buxhall, 8 Clare, 9 Cockfield, 10 Corton, 11 Creeting St Mary, 12 Crowfield, 13 Dalham, 14 Drinkstone, 15 Framsden, 16 Friston, 17 Gazeley, 18 Great Thurlow, 19 Great Welnetham, 20 Herringfleet, 21 Holton, 22 Kelsale, 23 Leiston, 24 Lound, 25 Pakenham, 26 Reydon, 27 Saxtead Green, 28 Stansfield, 29 Stanton, 30 Stowmarket, 31 Thelnetham, 32 Thorpeness, 33 Walberswick, 34 Walton, 35 Woodbridge (Buttrum's), 36 Woodbridge (Tricker's).

== Locations ==
=== A ===
| Location | Name of mill and grid reference | Type | Maps | First mention or built | Last mention or demise | Photograph |
|---|---|---|---|---|---|---|
| Aldeburgh | Approximately; TM 465 565 | Post | 1588 | 1588 | 1588 | |
| Aldeburgh | Approximately; TM 464 564 | Post | 1588; 1594 | 1588 | 1594 | |
| Aldeburgh | Approximately; TM 465 572 | Post | 1588 | 1588 | 1588 | |
| Aldeburgh | Station Mill; TM 460 570 | Post | | 1725 | Demolished 1924 | |
| Aldeburgh | Fort Green Mill; TM 464 559 | Tower | | 1824 | Windmill World | |
| Aldeburgh | TM 461 562 | Hollow post | | 1851 | 1882 | |
| Aldeburgh | Black Mill, Aldeburgh, on Thorpe Road, in Black Mill (?); TM 468 582 | Smock | | 1800 | Demolished c. 1900 | |
| Aldeburgh | Thorpe Road; TM 465 582 | | 1903 | 1903 | 1903 | |
| Aldeburgh | Corporation Marshes; TM 451 555 | Smock | 1882 | 1882 | 1897, gone by 1902 | |
| Alderton | TM 345 424 | | 1736 | 1736 | 1736 | |
| Alderton | TM 346 416 | Smock | | 1796 | Demolished 1956 | |
| Aldringham | TM 443 608 | Post | | 1803 | Dismantled 1922, re-erected at Thorpeness in 1923 | |
| All Saints, South Elmham | TM 344 828 | Tower | 1824 | 1824 | 1914, gone by 1918 | |
| Alpheton | TL 878 494 | Post | 1824 | 1824 | Demolished 1879 | |
| Alpheton | | Post | | c. 1875 | | |
| Ashbocking | TM 187 547 | Post | 1826 | 1826 | Demolished c. 1895 | |
| Assington | TL 933 372 | Post | | 1868 | Standing in 1902 | |

=== B ===
| Location | Name of mill and grid reference | Type | Maps | First mention or built | Last mention or demise | Photograph |
|---|---|---|---|---|---|---|
| Bacton | TM 044 664 | Post | | 1799 | Blown down c. 1900 | |
| Badingham | Approximately; TM 308 680 | Post | | | Moved to Colston Hall, Badingham by 1824 | |
| Badingham | Colston Hall Mill approximately TM 320 672 | Post | | | Moved within Badingham c. 1870 | |
| Badingham | New Mill; TM 320 677 | Post | | c. 1870 | Burnt down 1916 or 1922 | |
| Badingham | Low Street Mill; TM 311 688 | Post | 1783 | 1783 | Blown down 1795 | |
| Badingham | Low Street Mill; TM 311 688 | Post | | c. 1795 | Demolished c. 1913 | |
| Badwell Ash | TL 986 687 | Post | 1783 | 1783 | Demolished 1930 | |
| Badley | | Post | | | Burnt down 1833 | |
| Badley | | | | 1844 | 1844 | |
| Ballingdon | | | | 1795 | 1795 | |
| Bardwell | | | | 1283 | 1300 | |
| Bardwell | TL 948 730 | Post | 1783 | 1783 | Moved to Hopton 1834 | |
| Bardwell | Bardwell Mill; TL 941 738 | Tower | | 1823 | Windmill World | |
| Barham | Workhouse Mill approximately TM 941 737 | | | | | |
| Barking | Mill Lane Mill; TM 092 541 | Smock | | c. 1792 | Demolished 1918 | |
| Barking Tye | TM 065 521 | | 1783 | 1783 | | |
| Barking Tye | TM 065 521 | Post | | Early 19th century | Demolished 1910 | |
| Barnby | TM 474 898 | | 1837 | 1837 | Demolished by 1883 | |
| Barnby | Hober Mill; TM 487 918 | | 1826 | 1826 | 1826 | |
| Barnham | Approximately; TL 876 786 | Post | 1736 | | Moved to Stanton | |
| Barnham | Barnham Mill; TL 867 791 | Tower | | 1821 | Windmill World | |
| Barningham | TL 973 769 | Post | 1783 | 1783 | | |
| Barningham | TL 973 768 | Post | 1783 | 1783 | | |
| Barrow | Old Mill; TL 767 641 | Post | | c. 1730 | Demolished c. 1883 | |
| Barrow | Approximately; TL 764 638 | Post | | 1802 | | |
| Barrow | TL 765 637 | Smock | 1824 | 1824 | Demolished 1926 | |
| Barsham | TM 400 910 | Tower | 1838 | 1815 | Gone by 1927 | |
| Barton Mills | TL 729 735 | | 1824 | 1824 | | |
| Beccles | Bullock's Mill; TM 421 896 | Post | 1736 | 1736 | | |
| Beccles | Hadingham's Mill; TM 421 898 | Tower | 1824 | 1824 | Demolished 1923 | |
| Beccles | Sayer's Mill; TM 423 910 | | 1826 | 1826 | | |
| Beccles | Ingate Mill; TM 432 897 | Post | 1783 | 1783 | 1882 | |
| Beccles | Castle Mill; TM 425 896 | Tower | 1838 | 1838 | | |
| Beccles | TM 437 926 | | 1838 | 1838 | Demolished c. 1880 | |
| Bedfield | TM 222 664 | Post | 1824 | 1824 | Moved within Bedfield by 1842. | |
| Bedfield | TM 222 663 | Post | 1842 | 1842 | Demolished 1903 | |
| Bedingfield | TM 176 683 | Post | | 1828 | Demolished 1921 or 1922 | |
| Belstead | TM 133 411 | | 1838 | 1838 | Burnt down 1894 | |
| Benhall | Benhall Green Mill; TM 382 610 | Post | 1736 | 1736 | Demolished c. 1921 | |
| Benhall | Approximately; TM 380 601 | | 1736 | 1736 | 1736 | |
| Bentley | TM 112 368 | | 1826 | 1826 | Gone by 1881 | |
| Beyton | TL 934 629 | Post | 1837 | 1837 | | |
| Bildeston | TL 996 491 | post | | 1798 | Gone by 1887 | |
| Blaxhall | Dyke's Mill; TM 369 572 | Post | 1783 | 1783 | Burnt down 1883 | |
| Blundeston | Blundeston Mill; TM 517 974 | Tower | | c. 1820 | Windmill World | |
| Blundeston | TM 499 952 | Tower | 1826 | 1826 | 1900 | |
| Blythburgh | Prior's Mill; TM 453 782 | Post | 1736 | 1736 | 1782 | |
| Blythburgh | TM 453 749 | Smock | 1824 | 1824 | Demolished 1937 | |
| Botesdale | (two mills) | | | 1289 | 1289 | |
| Botesdale | Approximately; TM 049 761 | | 1764 | 1764 | 1764 | |
| Botesdale | TM 047 756 | Post | 1817 | 1817 | Gone by 1885 | |
| Botesdale | Lodge Mill; TM 054 757 | Post | | 1777 | Demolished c. 1916 | |
| Botesdale | TM 049 755 | Smock | 1885 | 1885 | Demolished c. 1918 | |
| Botesdale | Black Mill; TM 058 750 | Tower | | c. 1854 | Demolished c. 1909 | |
| Botesdale | TM 052 762 | | 1783 | 1783 | 1783 | |
| Boxford | Calais Street Mill; TL 972 402 | Post | 1824 | 1824 | Gone by 1885 | |
| Boxford | Cherry Ground Mill; TL 972 397 | Post | 1783 | 1783 | 1885 | |
| Boxford | Whitestreet Green Mill; TL 974 392 | Post | 1824 | 1824 | Gone by 1885 | |
| Boxford | TL 949 402 | | 1783 | 1783 | 1783 | |
| Boxford | TL 959 402 | Smock | | 1841 | Demolished 1901 | |
| Boxted | Fenstead End Mill; TL 806 509 | Smock | 1783 | 1783 | 1783 | |
| Boyton | TM 378 470 | Post | 1824 | 1824 | Burnt down c. 1910 | |
| Bradfield St George | TL 922 587 | Post | 1826 | 1826 | Demolished c. 1860 | |
| Bradfield St George | TL 923 585 | Smock | 1824 | 1824 | Demolished 1943 | |
| Bramfield | TM 404 739 | Post | 1826 | 1826 | Demolished c. 1904 | |
| Bramfield | TM 398 753 | Post | | 1802 | Demolished 1815 | |
| Bramfield | Waterloo Mill; TM 398 753 | Tower | | 1815 | Demolished 1944 | |
| Brandeston | | Post | | | Burnt down 1893 | |
| Brandon | Mill Hill Mill; TL 788 858 | | 1736 | 1736 | 1736 | |
| Brandon | New Mill Piece Mill; TL 791 862 | | 1838 | 1838 | 1838 | |
| Brantham | TM 129 331 | | 1826 | 1826 | Demolished c. 1880 | |
| Bredfield | TM 270 536 | Post | | c. 1804 | | |
| Bredfield | | Post | | 1800 | | |
| Bredfield | TM 272 529 | Tower | 1838 | 1838 | Demolished c. 1919 | |
| Brent Eleigh | TL 938 476 | Post | 1805 | 1805 | Demolished 1895 | |
| Brent Eleigh | Town Hill Mill; TL 940 475 | | 1826 | 1826 | 1826 | |
| Brettenham | TL 955 537 | Post | 1783 | 1783 | Demolished 1804 | |
| Brettenham | TL 955 537 | Smock | 1824 | 1804 | 1939 | |
| Brockley | Mill Hill Mill; TL 829 562 | | 1783 | 1783 | 1783 | |
| Brockley | Brockley Green Mill; TL 825 547 | Post | 1824 | 1824 | Demolished October 1930 | |
| Brome | TM 135 762 | Post | 1824 | 1824 | Demolished c. 1900; Windmill World | |
| Bruisyard | TM 328 662 | | 1783 | 1783 | 1783 | |
| Bruisyard | TM 329 665 | Post | 1837 | 1837 | 1837 | |
| Brundish | TM 257 702 | Post | 1824 | 1824 | Demolished 1920 | |
| Brundish | Upper Mill; TM 264 698 | post | 1783 | 1783 | Demolished c. 1914 | |
| Bungay | Flixton Road Mill; TM 339 892 | Post | 1826 | 1826 | Demolished 1879 | |
| Bungay | Flixton Road Mill; TM 339 890 | Tower | | 1830 | Truncated 1920s Windmill World | |
| Bungay | Sayer's Mill; TM 336 895 | Tower | 1826 | 1826 | Burnt down 24 November 1867. | |
| Bungay | Approximately; TM 338 894 | Smock | 1783 | 1783 | 1830 | |
| Bungay | Wren's Park Mill; TM 340 895 | Smock | 1783 | 1775 | 1824 | |
| Bungay | Upland Mill; TM 339 887 | Post | 1838 | 1838 | Demolished 1918 | |
| Bungay | TM 338 890 | Tower | 1826 | 1826 | 1918 | |
| Bungay | Approximately; TM 342 896 | | 1764 | 1764 | 1764 | |
| Burgh | TM 230 514 | Tower | 1826 | 1826 | Gone by 1842 | |
| Burgh | Burgh Windmill; TM 230 514 | Tower | | 1842 | Windmill World | |
| Bury St Edmunds | Dean Herbert's Mill, Haberdon | | | 1191 | Demolished 1191 | |
| Bury St Edmunds | | | | 1286 | 1286 | |
| Bury St Edmunds | Sewage works TL 849 642 | Titt iron wind engine | | 1898 | Demolished c. 1940 | |
| Bury St Edmunds | | Titt iron wind engine | | 1900 | | |
| Bury St Edmunds | Mill Road Mill; TL 849 641 | Post | 1783 | 1783 | 1867 | |
| Bury St Edmunds | Tayfen Meadows Mill; TL 848 655 | | 1824 | 1824 | 1824 | |
| Bury St Edmunds | Kings Road Mill; TL 847 641 | Post | 1675 | 1675 | Moved to Wickhambrook c. 1850 | |
| Bury St Edmunds | Kings Road Mill; TL 847 642 | Smock | 1836 | 1836 | Demolished c. 1913 | |
| Bury St Edmunds | Southgate Mill; TL 861 628 | | | | Burnt down 10 August 1761 | |
| Bury St Edmunds | Southgate Mill; TL 861 628 | Post | 1783 | 1783 | 1903 | |
| Bury St Edmunds | Nowton Road Mill; TL 861 627 | Tower | | 1836 | c. 1900 | |
| Bury St Edmunds | TL 860 630 | Post | 1740 | 1740 | 1845 | |
| Bury St Edmunds | West Mill; TL 842 632 | Post | 1783 | 1783 | Demolished 1918 | |
| Bury St Edmunds | Eastgate Mill approximately TL 864 645 | | | 1597 | 1688 | |
| Butley | TM 385 515 | Post | 1783 | 1783 | Burnt down 1842 | |
| Butley | TM 385 515 | Post | | 1842 | c. 1883 | |
| Buxhall | Buxhall Mill; TL 996 577 | Post | 1783 | 1783 | Burnt down 9 July 1814 | |
| Buxhall | Buxhall Mill; TL 996 577 | Smock | | 1815 | Demolished 1860 | |
| Buxhall | Buxhall Mill; TL 996 577 | Tower | | 1860 | Windmill World | |

=== C ===
| Location | Name of mill and grid reference | Type | Maps | First mention or built | Last mention or demise | Photograph |
|---|---|---|---|---|---|---|
| Campsea Ashe | TM 319 550 | | 1783 | 1783 | 1783 | |
| Campsea Ashe | TM 320 560 | Post | 1820 | 1820 | | |
| Capel St Mary | Windmill Hill Mill; TM 083 383 | Post | 1826 | 1826 | Demolished 1909 | |
| Capel St Mary | TM 088 381 | Smock | | 1848 | Demolished 1886 | |
| Carlton Colville | Share Mill; TM 494 928 | | 1837 | 1837 | Gone by 1883 | |
| Charsfield | TM 249 561 | Post | 1783 | 1783 | 1783 | |
| Charsfield | TM 256 569 | | 1824 | 1824 | 1824 | |
| Charsfield | TM 256 570 | Post | 1824 | 1824 | Demolished 1917 | |
| Chattisham | TM 090 425 | Smock | 1838 | 1838 | 1845 | |
| Chattisham | TM 090 425 | Smock | | 1867 | 1947 | |
| Chedburgh | TL 790 576 | | 1824 | 1824 | 1824 | |
| Chediston | TM 346 776 | Tower | 1826 | 1826 | Demolished 1925 | |
| Chelmondiston | Elmer's Mill; TM 200 374 | Post | 1783 | 1783 | Demolished 1913 or 1914 | |
| Chevington | TL 200 374 | Post | 1783 | 1783 | 1900 | |
| Clare | | | | 13th century | 13th century | |
| Clare | Chilton Street Mill; TL 757 472 | | | 1846 | Windmill World | |
| Clare | Mill Hill Mill; TL 775 454 | Post | 1678 | 1678 | 1678 | |
| Clare | TL 762 446 | Post | 1783 | 1783 | Blown down 6 November 1875. | |
| Claydon | TM 132 502 | Post | 1783 | 1783 | Burnt down January 1784 | |
| Claydon | TM 132 502 | Post | | c. 1784 | Burnt down 1923 | |
| Cockfield | TL 901 545 | Post | 1783 | 1783 | 1902 | |
| Cockfield | TL 901 542 | Post | 1783 | 1783 | Blown down 1860 | |
| Cockfield | TL 896 554 | Smock | 1826 | 1826 | 1826, gone by 1837 | |
| Cockfield | Pepper Mill; TL 904 539 | Tower | 1826 | 1826 | Demolished c. 1891 | |
| Cockfield | Cockfield Mill; TL 904 539 | Tower | | 1891 | Windmill World | |
| Coddenham | | | | 1338 | 1338 | |
| Coddenham | TM 135 544 | Post | 1785 | 1785 | Demolished 1810 | |
| Coddenham | TM 135 544 | Post | | 1810 | Demolished 1909 | |
| Combs | Upper Mill; TM 020 538 | Post | 1736 | 1736 | Standing in 1922, demolished late 1920s | |
| Combs | Branstead Mill; TM 035 557 | Post | 1736 | 1736 | Demolished 1937 | |
| Copdock | Approximately; TM 115 411 | Post | | c. 1810 | | |
| Corton | | Post | | 1793 | 1848 | |
| Corton | Corton Windmill; TM 542 974 | Tower | | 1837 | Windmill World | |
| Cotton | TM 068 672 | Post | 1783 | 1783 | Demolished c. 1915 | |
| Cowlinge | TL 714 537 | Smock | 1824 | 1824 | Demolished February 1955 | |
| Cransford | TM 329 651 | Smock | 1837 | 1837 | Moved to Peasenhall c. 1882 | |
| Cratfield | Bell Green Mill; TM 308 755 | Post | | c. 1824 | Blown down 1879 | |
| Cratfield | North Green Mill; TM 304 768 | Post | | | | |
| Creeting St Mary | Creeting St Mary Mill; TM 095 558 | Post | | 1796 | c. 1860 | |
| Creeting St Mary | TM 113 578 | | 1837 | 1837 | 1837 | |
| Creeting St Mary | Creeting Bottoms Mill; TM 117 582 | | 1764 | 1764 | 1764 | |
| Creeting St Peter | | Post | | c. 1800 | | |
| Creeting St Peter | West Creeting Green Mill; TM 078 582 | | 1903 | 1903 | 1903 | |
| Cretingham | TM 233 603 | Post | 1837 | 1837 | 1837 | |
| Cretingham | | Tower | | 1834 | 1860 | |
| Crowfield | Crowfield Mill; TM 151 571 | Smock | 1883 | 1840s | | |
| Culford | Approximately; TL 825 696 | post | 1783 | 1783 | 1783 | |
| Culford | TL 821 700 | Post | 1836 | 1836 | 1836 | |

=== D ===
| Location | Name of mill and grid reference | Type | Maps | First mention or built | Last mention or demise | Photograph |
|---|---|---|---|---|---|---|
| Dalham | Lower Mill; TL 719 617 | Smock | | 1802 | Windmill World | |
| Darsham | TM 420 693 | Post | 1783 | 1783 | Moved within Darsham 1801 | |
| Darsham | TM 415 702 | Post | | 1801 | Demolished 1937; Windmill World | |
| Debach | TM 248 556 | Post | 1824 | 1824 | 1824 | |
| Debenham | TM 171 638 | Post | 1826 | 1826 | Demolished c. 1890 | |
| Debenham | Page's Mill; TM 182 638 | Post | 1736 | 1736 | Demolished c. 1917 | |
| Debenham | TM 165630 | Post | 1736 | 1736 | Demolished 1839 | |
| Debenham | TM 165 630 | Tower | | 1839 | Demolished December 1962; Windmill World | |
| Denham | TM 195 740 | Post | 1783 | 1783 | Demolished 1910 | |
| Dennington | TM 278 669 | Post | | | Moved to Trimley St Martin, 1804 | |
| Dennington | TM 286 670 | Post | | c. 1822 | Demolished 1925 | |
| Depden | TL 776 575 | Post | 1783 | 1783 | Demolished c. 1910 | |
| Drinkstone | Drinkstone Post Mill; TL 964 622 | Post | | 1689 | Windmill World | |
| Drinkstone | Drinkstone Smock Mill; TL 962 622 | Smock | | 1780 | Windmill World | |
| Drinkstone | Mill Farm Mill | Post | | | Gone by 1780 | |
| Dunwich | (two mills) | Post | 1587 | 1587 | 1587 | |
| Dunwich | TM 476 507 | | 1883 | 1883 | 1883 | |
| Dunwich | Corporation Marshes; TM 486 732 | Titt iron wind engine | 1897 | 1895 | 1957 | |

=== E ===
| Location | Name of mill and grid reference | Type | Maps | First mention or built | Last mention or demise | Photograph |
|---|---|---|---|---|---|---|
| Earl Soham | TM 247 644 | Post | | 1849 | | |
| Earl Soham | Ashfield Mill; TM 219 634 | Post | | 1739 | Demolished 1947 | |
| Earl Soham | TM 227 628 | Post | 1783 | 1783 | Demolished 1947; Windmill World | |
| Earl Stonham | Bell's Cross Mill; TM 089 598 | Post | 1824 | 1824 | Blown down 1908 | |
| Earl Stonham | TM 090 597 | Post | 1824 | 1824 | Demolished 1905 | |
| East Bergholt | Black Mill; TM 084 350 | Post | | 1779 | 1779 | |
| East Bergholt | White Mill; TM 084 349 | Post | | 1779 | 1779 | |
| Edwardstone | Mill Green Mill; TL 952 426 | Smock | 1783 | 1783 | 1783 | |
| Elmsett | Mill Farm Mill; TM055461 | Post | 1824 | 1824 | 1824 | |
| Elmsett | TM 055 463 | Post | 1838 | 1838 | Moved to Offton by 1866 | |
| Elmsett | Ladbrook's Mill; TM 048 465 | Post | | c. 1830 | Demolished 1929 or 1930; Windmill World | |
| Eriswell | TL 723 801 | Smock | | Mid-19th century | 1918; Windmill World | |
| Exning | | | | 1293 | 1293 | |
| Exning | TL 625 658 | | 1783 | 1783 | 1783 | |
| Eye | Castle Mill; TM 147 738 | Post | | 1561 | | |
| Eye | Castle Mill; TM 147 738 | Post | 1783 | 1783 | Moved to Cranley Green, Eye 1845 | |
| Eye | Cranley Green Mill; TM 160 726 | Post | | 1845 | Demolished 1917 | |
| Eye | TM 146 740 | Smock | 1837 | 1837 | Moved to Occold | |
| Eye | Hayward's Mill; TM 160 736 | Tower | 1837 | 1837 | 1916 | |
| Eye | Victoria Mill; TM 139 742 | Post | | 1779 | Blown down 1955 | |
| Eyke | TM 318 521 | Post | 1783 | 1783 | Demolished 1910 | |

=== F ===
| Location | Name of mill and grid reference | Type | Maps | First mention or built | Last mention or demise | Photograph |
|---|---|---|---|---|---|---|
| Felixstowe | Ferry Road Mill approximately TM 318 363 | | | | Gone by 1740 | |
| Felsham | TL 994 571 | Post | 1824 | 1824 | Moved to Gedding, 1867 | |
| Finningham | TM 067 686 | Post | 1783 | 1783 | Demolished 1877 | |
| Flowton | TM 083 469 | Smock | 1838 | 1838 | Demolished c. 1910 | |
| Fornham All Saints | TL 834 685 | | 1882 | 1882 | 1882 | |
| Fornham St Genevieve | TL 832 692 | Post | 1783 | 1783 | 1783 | |
| Fornham St Martin | TL 848 672 | Post | 1824 | 1824 | Moved by 1882 | |
| Fornham St Martin | TL 849 671 | Smock | 1836 | 1836 | Blown down 1927 | |
| Fornham St Martin | Approximately; TL 859 663 | | 1783 | 1783 | 1783 | |
| Framlingham | | Post | | 1279 | 1279 | |
| Framlingham | Saxtead | | | 1287 | 1309 | |
| Framlingham | Saxtead Green Mill; TM 253 644 | Post | | 1796 | Windmill World | |
| Framlingham | Saxtead Lodge Farm Mill; TM 265643 | Smock | | c. 1890 | Demolished 1921 | |
| Framlingham | TM 283 632 | Smock | 1736 | 1712 | Demolished 1712; Windmill World | |
| Framlingham | Saxmundham Road Mill; TM 292 635 | Post | 1826 | 1826 | Demolished 1884 | |
| Framlingham | Mount Pleasant Mill; TM 279 638 | Post | 1824 | 1824 | Demolished August 1921 | |
| Framlingham | Mount Pleasant Mill; TM 278 638 | Post | 1736 | 1736 | Moved to Tannington c. 1855 | |
| Framlingham | TM 283 630 | Post | | 1574 | Demolished c. 1712 | |
| Framlingham | TM 283 630 | Post | 1826 | 1712 | Burnt down 1842 | |
| Framlingham | Victoria Mill; TM 283 630 | Tower | | 1843 | Demolished June 1935 | |
| Framsden | Ashfield Place Mill; TM 200 614 | Smock | | c. 1820 | Demolished c. 1882 | |
| Framsden | Ashfield Place Mill; TM 200 641 | Post | | c. 1882 | Demolished 1922 | |
| Framsden | Webster's Mill; TM 192 598 | Post | | 1760 | | |
| Freckenham | TL 662 716 | Smock | | 1781 | Demolished c. 1910 | |
| Freckenham | TL 661 720 | Smock | | 1821 | Demolished 1967 | |
| Freckenham | Lee Brook Mill; TL 665 749 | | 1881 | 1881 | Gone by 1901 | |
| Fressingfield | Algar's Mill; TM 255 774 | Post | 1884 | 1884 | Demolished c. 1895 | |
| Fressingfield | TM 254 772 | Post | 1826 | 1826 | Demolished c. 1929 | |
| Fressingfield | Chippenhall Green Mill; TM 287 759 | Post | 1783 | 1712 | 1783 | |
| Fressingfield | Chippenhall Green Mill; TM 287 759 | Post | | 1792 | Demolished February 1936 | |
| Friston | Friston Mill; TM 411 601 | Post | | 1812 | Windmill World | |

=== G ===
| Location | Name of mill and grid reference | Type | Maps | First mention or built | Last mention or demise | Photograph |
|---|---|---|---|---|---|---|
| Gazeley | TL 718 649 | Post | 1824 | 1824 | 1844, later blown down | |
| Gazeley | Gazeley Mill; TL 717 649 | Tower | | 1844 | | |
| Gedding | TL 956 576 | Post | 1783 | 1783 | Demolished c. 1904 | |
| Gedding | TL 957 576 | Post | | 1867 | Demolished 1944 | |
| Gedgrave | Chillesford Lodge Mill; TM 399 502 | Tower | 1820 | 1820 | 1957 | |
| Gisleham | TM 512 867 | Post | | 1807 | Burnt down 1911 | |
| Gislingham | Allwood Green Mill; TM 048 717 | Post | 1783 | 1615 | Demolished c. 1885 | |
| Gislingham | Mill Street Mill approximately TM 070 720 | | 1826 | 1826 | 1826 | |
| Gislingham | Mill Street Mill; TM 067 720 | Tower | | 1821 | Demolished 1930 | |
| Glemsford | TL 833 480 | | 1799 | 1761 | 1799 | |
| Glemsford | Weston Mill; TL 833 466 | post mill | 1826 | 1820 | 1826 | |
| Gosbeck | | Post | | | Moved to Barking Tye early 19th century | |
| Gosbeck | TM 160 555 | Post | 1826 | 1826 | Demolished c. 1865 | |
| Gosbeck | TM 160 555 | Post | | c. 1865 | Demolished 1924; Windmill World | |
| Great Ashfield | Button Haugh Green Mill; TL 990 665 | Post | 1783 | 1783 | Demolished c. 1917 | |
| Great Barton | TL 881 678 | Post | 1783 | 1783 | Demolished c. 1920 | |
| Great Bealings | TM 236 486 | Post | | c. 1810 | c. 1810 | |
| Great Bradley | TL 665 534 | | 1783 | 1783 | Demolished 1839 | |
| Great Bradley | TL 665 534 | Tower | | 1839 | Demolished 1949 | |
| Great Bricett | TM 038 504 | Post | 1783 | 1783 | Demolished 1851 | |
| Great Bricett | TM 038 504 | Smock | | 1851 | Demolished September 1954 | |
| Great Cornard | | | | | Blown down 1795 | |
| Great Cornard | TL 884 410 | | 1805 | 1805 | 1805 | |
| Great Cornard | Approximately; TL 884 407 | | 1805 | 1805 | 1805 | |
| Great Cornard | TL 884 405 | Post | 1805 | 1805 | 1805 | |
| Great Cornard | TL 882 399 | Hollow post | | | | |
| Great Cornard | TL 893 394 | Smock | 1885 | 1885 | 1920 | |
| Great Cornard | TM 884 407 | | 1902 | 1902 | 1902 | |
| Great Finborough | TM 010 563 | Post | | 1814 | 1884 | |
| Great Thurlow | TL 671 500 | Post | | | Demolished 1807 | |
| Great Thurlow | Collis Mill; TL 671 500 | Smock | | 1807 | Windmill World | |
| Great Waldingfield | TL 906 438 | Smock | 1824 | 1824 | Demolished 1912 | |
| Great Welnetham | Chapelhill Mill; TL 889 586 | Post | | c. 1801 | Demolished c. 1914 | |
| Great Welnetham | TL 880 578 | Post | 1783 | 1783 | Demolished c. 1949 | |
| Great Welnetham | Tutelina Mill; Clarke's Mill; TL 878 598 | Tower | | 1865 | Windmill World | |
| Great Wratting | TL 699 488 | | | 1780 | 1780, gone by 1840 | |
| Grundisburgh | (two mills) | | | 1341 | 1341 | |
| Grundisburgh | TM 224 505 | Post | | 1807 | Demolished c. 1934; Windmill World | |
| Grundisburgh | Approximately; TM 221 507 | Smock | | c. 1885 | Standing 1929, demolished late 1930s | |

=== H ===
| Location | Name of mill and grid reference | Type | Maps | First mention or built | Last mention or demise | Photograph |
|---|---|---|---|---|---|---|
| Hacheston | TM 307 594 | Post | 1826 | 1826 | 1826 | |
| Hacheston | Bridge Farm Mill | Smock | | | Moved within Hacheston | |
| Hacheston | TM 312 567 | Smock | | | Moved to Framlingham c. 1890 | |
| Hadleigh | Approximately; TM 025 433 | | 1824 | 1824 | 1824 | |
| Hadleigh | Mill Hill Mill; TM 016 447 | Post | 1783 | 1783 | Moved to Elmsett c. 1830 | |
| Hadleigh | TM 035 428 | Smock | 1783 | 1783 | Demolished c. 1835 | |
| Hadleigh | TM 035 428 | Tower | | 1835 | Demolished early 1920s | |
| Halesworth | Gothic mill TM 387 773 | Post | 1837 | 1837 | 1837 | |
| Halesworth | Broadway Mill; TM 394 790 | Post | | 1844 | 1878 | |
| Halesworth | Pound Hill Mill; TM 383 769 | Post | 1783 | 1783 | Gone by 1900 | |
| Halesworth | Pound Hill Mill; TM 384 769 | Composite | 1783 | 1783 | Converted to Composite mill | |
| Halesworth | Pound Hill Mill; TM 384 769 | Composite | | | Demolished c. 1905 | |
| Halesworth | Calver's Mill; TM 385 777 | Post | | 1788 | Demolished 1942 | |
| Halesworth | Mill Hill Mill approximately TM 385 777 | Smock | | c. 1810 | | |
| Hargrave | TL 770 604 | Smock | 1783 | 1783 | Gone by 1914 | |
| Hartest | | | | 1256 | 1256 | |
| Hartest | TL 838 520 | | 1836 | 1762 | 1836 | |
| Hartest | TL 826 520 | Post | 1783 | 1783 | Collapsed 1810 | |
| Hartest | TL 826 520 | Post | | c. 1810 | Demolished c. 1844 | |
| Hartest | TL 826 520 | Post | | 1844 | Burnt down c. 1958 | |
| Hasketon | TM 242 503 | | 1824 | 1824 | 1824 | |
| Hasketon | Goddard's Mill; TM 241 501 | Tower | 1824 | 1824 | Demolished 1925 | |
| Haughley | Mere Mill; TM 029 625 | Post | 1824 | 1824 | Burnt down c. 1900 | |
| Haughley | TM 031 622 | Post | | 1811 | Burnt down August 1943 | |
| Haughley Green | TM 030 644 | Post | 1783 | 1783 | Demolished c. 1896 | |
| Haverhill | | | | 13th century | 13th century | |
| Haverhill | Mill Hill Mill; TL 669 451 | | 1824 | 1824 | 1824 | |
| Haverhill | Castle Mill; TL 663 457 | Post | 1824 | 1824 | Demolished 1901 | |
| Haverhill | Mill Road Mill; TL 671 452 | Tower | 1824 | 1824 | Demolished 1901 | |
| Haverhill | TL 674 460 | Post | 1793 | 1768 | Converted to Composite mill | |
| Haverhill | TL 674 460 | Composite | | | Demolished c. 1855 | |
| Haverhill | TL 674 460 | Tower | | c. 1855 | Demolished 1942 | |
| Hawstead | | | | 1367 | 1367 | |
| Henley | TM 155 515 | Post | | 1810 | Burnt down 27 November 1884 | |
| Hepworth | TL 995 743 | Post | 1783 | 1783 | 1783 | |
| Herringfleet | Walker's Mill; TM 466 976 | Smock | 1826 | c. 1820 | Windmill World | |
| Higham (near Hadleigh) | TM 032 361 | | 1805 | 1805 | 1805 | |
| Higham (near Newmarket) | Approximately; TL 745 655 | Tower | 1824 | 1824 | Demolished c. 1885 | |
| Hinderclay | TM 021 766 | Post | 1824 | 1824 | 1824 | |
| Hinderclay | TM 021 766 | Tower | | | Demolished c. 1935 | |
| Hintlesham | TM 095 436 | Post | | c. 1807 | 1880 | |
| Hitcham | Millhill Farm Mill; TL 998 545 | Post | | c. 1902 | c. 1904 | |
| Hitcham | TL 986 514 | Post | 1783 | 1783 | 1783 | |
| Hitcham | Cross Green Mill; TL 991 531 | Tower | 1824 | 1824 | Demolished c. 1925 | |
| Hollesley | TM 342 435 | Post | 1783 | 1783 | Blown down 18 January 1881 | |
| Hollesley | TM 352 447 | | 1826 | 1826 | Gone by 1880 | |
| Holton St Peter | Holton Mill; TM 402 774 | Post | | 1749 | Windmill World | |
| Honington | TL 912 738 | Post | 1837 | 1837 | Demolished c. 1895; Windmill World | |
| Honington | TL 911 739 | Post | 1837 | 1837 | 1837 | |
| Hopton | Approximately; TL 998 801 | Post | 1826 | 1806 | 1826 | |
| Hopton | TL 998 801 | Post | 1783 | 1783 | 1824 | |
| Hopton | TL 998 801 | Post | | 1834 | Demolished c. 1912 | |
| Horham | TM 208 724 | Post | | 1750 | Demolished 1934 | |
| Hoxne | TM 192 776 | Post | 1736 | 1736 | 1736 | |
| Hoxne | Chase's Mill; TM 192 777 | Post | 1826 | 1826 | Demolished 1923 | |
| Hoxne | Cross Street Mill; TM 186 762 | Post | 1783; 1824 | 1783 | Body moved to Worlingworth | |
| Hundon | Mansfield's Mill; TL 735 492 | Post | 1783 | 1783 | Demolished c. 1928 | |
| Hundon | Brockley Mill; Ruse's Mill; TL 721 470 | Post | 1824 | 1824 | 1905 | |
| Hundon | Savage's Mill; TL 718 471 | Post | 1884 | 1884 | 1905 | |
| Hundon | TL 739 494 | Titt iron wind engine | | | Standing c. 1940 | |
| Hundon | Clare Waterworks; TL 741 497 | | 1902 | 1902 | 1902 | |
| Hunston | Mill Hill Mill approximately TL 980 676 | | | | Moved to Badwell Ash by 1783 | |
| Huntingfield | Barrell's Mill; TM 335 749 | Post | 1824 | 1824 | 1824 | |
| Huntingfield | Whitehouse Farm Mill approximately TM 327 743 | Post | | c. 1840 | Blown down 1879, rebuilt at new site | |
| Huntingfield | Aldridge's Mill; TM 321 745 | Post | | 1879 | Demolished 1928 | |

=== I ===
| Location | Name of mill and grid reference | Type | Maps | First mention or built | Last mention or demise | Photograph |
|---|---|---|---|---|---|---|
| Icklingham | TL 778 726 | | 1826 | 1826 | 1826 | |
| Ilketshall St Andrew | Mill Common Mill; TM 376 877 | Post | | | | |
| Ilketshall St Andrew | Mill Common Mill; TM 375 877 | Post | 1783 | 1783 | 1783 | |
| Ilketshall St Lawrence | TM 378 840 | Tower | | 1812 | 1978 | |
| Ipswich | | | | 1332 | 1332 | |
| Ipswich | Approximately; TM 173 443 | Post | 1674 | 1674 | 1674 | |
| Ipswich | Town Marshes approximately TM 160 442 | | | 1733 | Gone by 1812 | |
| Ipswich | Town Marshes approximately TM 160 442 | | | c. 1733 | Gone by 1812 | |
| Ipswich | Bishop's Hill Mill; TM 176 438 | Post | 1736 | 1736 | Blown down 1795 | |
| Ipswich | Bishop's Hill Mill; TM 176 438 | Post | | c. 1795 | Moved to Offton 1866 | |
| Ipswich | Foxhall Road Mill; TM 191 440 | Post | 1812 | 1812 | Gone by 1885 | |
| Ipswich | Sidegate Lane Mill; TM 179 454 | | 1838 | 1838 | Demolished c. 1870 | |
| Ipswich | Stoke Hill Mill; TM 159 437 | Post | 1736 | 1736 | Moved to Earl Soham 1849 | |
| Ipswich | Stoke Hill Mill; TM 160 437 | Post | 1764 | 1764 | Demolished 1887 | |
| Ipswich | Stoke Green Mill; TM 165 435 | Post | 1812 | 1812 | Demolished c. 1849 | |
| Ipswich | Belstead Road Mill; TM 154 431 | Post | 1812 | 1812 | 1866 | |
| Ipswich | Halifax Mill; TM 163 425 | Post | 1812; 1838 | 1812 | 1838 | |
| Ipswich | Halifax Mill; TM 163 425 | Post | 1838 | 1838 | 1838 | |
| Ipswich | Bolton Mill; TM 162 457 | Post | 1812 | 1812 | 1848 | |
| Ipswich | Folly Mill; TM 172 456 | Smock | 1812 | 1812 | Moved to Kettleburgh c. 1855 | |
| Ipswich | Anglesea Road Mill; TM 159 453 | Smock | 1826 | 1826 | 1848 | |
| Ipswich | Anglesea Road Mill; TM 157 452 | Post | | 1806 | Burnt down 28 January 1859 | |
| Ipswich | Albion Mill; TM 175 453 | Post | | 1882 | | |
| Ipswich | Albion Mill; TM 175 452 | | 1805 | 1805 | Gone by 1882 | |
| Ipswich | North Hill Road Mill; TM 173 449 | tower | 1783 | 1783 | Demolished c. 1886 | |
| Ipswich | Bank Road Mill; TM 174 451 | | 1848 | 1848 | 1848, gone by 1855 | |
| Ipswich | Bellvue Road Mill; TM 176 449 | Post | 1764 | 1764 | 1873 | |
| Ipswich | Woodbridge Road Mill approximately TM 177 450 | | 1826 | 1826 | 1826 | |
| Ipswich | Woodbridge Road Mill; TM 177 451 | | 1826 | 1826 | 1836 | |
| Ipswich | Bramford Road Mill; TM 149 452 | Tower | | 1844 | Demolished 1953 | |
| Ipswich | Lattice Lane Mill; TM 189 448 | Smock | | 1881 | Demolished c. 1930 | |
| Ipswich | Lower Orwell Street Mill | Post | | 1753 | 1753 | |
| Ipswich | Tuddenham Road Mill | Smock | | | Moved to Kettleburgh c. 1855 | |
| Ixworth | | | | 1393 | 1394 | |
| Ixworth | Approximately; TL 941 703 | | 1783 | 1783 | 1783 | |
| Ixworth | TL 924 711 | | 1824 | 1824 | Gone by 1882 | |
| Ixworth | TL 936 708 | | 1826 | 1826 | 1826 | |
| Ixworth | TL 941 692 | | 1826 | 1826 | 1826 | |

=== K ===
| Location | Name of mill and grid reference | Type | Maps | First mention or built | Last mention or demise | Photograph |
|---|---|---|---|---|---|---|
| Kedington | TL 701 464 | Post | 1838 | 1838 | 1902 | |
| Kedington | TL 702 464 | Tower | 1783 | 1783 | Demolished October 1945 | |
| Kedington | Approximately; TL 703 456 | Post | 1724; 1777 | 1722 | 1777 | |
| Kelsale | | | | c. 1267 | c. 1267 | |
| Kelsale | Dorley's Corner Mill; Harvey's Mill; TM 385 660 | Post | 1764 | 1764 | Demolished 1924; Windmill World | |
| Kelsale | Carlton Mill approximately TM 386 642 | | 1783 | 1783 | 1783 | |
| Kelsale | Carlton Mill; TM 381 647 | Post | | c. 1815 | Demolished c. 1895 | |
| Kelsale | Skoulding's Mill; TM 382 647 | Tower | | 1856 | Windmill World | |
| Kersey | Williams Green Mill; TL 990 425 | Tower | 1824 | 1824 | Demolished 1907 | |
| Kessingland | Approximately; TM 517 865 | | 1783 | 1783 | 1783 | |
| Kettleburgh | TM 267 598 | Smock | | c. 1855 | 1872 | |
| Knodishall | Approximately; TM 416 604 | | 1783 | 1783 | 1783 | |
| Knodishall | Coldfair Green Mill; TM 434 610 | Post | 1836 | 1836 | Demolished 1908 | |

=== L ===
| Location | Name of mill and grid reference | Type | Maps | First mention or built | Last mention or demise | Photograph |
|---|---|---|---|---|---|---|
| Lakenheath | TL 719 829 | | 1783 | 1783 | 1783 | |
| Lakenheath | Claypits Mill; TL 710 817 | Tower | 1824 | 1824 | 1945 | |
| Lakenheath | TL 719 822 | | 1880 | 1880 | 1880 | |
| Lakenheath | TL 721 820 | | 1880 | 1880 | 1880 | |
| Lakenheath | Turf Fen Mill; TL 692 838 | Smock | 1824 | 1824 | 1881 | |
| Lakenheath | TL 673 851 | Smock | 1854 | 1854 | Gone by 1881 | |
| Lakenheath | Crosswater's Mill; TL 677 855 | | 1783 | 1783 | Gone by 1854 | |
| Lakenheath | Approximately; TL 673 857 | | 1824 | 1824 | 1824 | |
| Lakenheath | Great Fen Mill; TL 678 855 | Smock | 1881 | Mid-19th century | Demolished c. 1949 | |
| Lavenham | TL 915 499 | Post | 1783 | 1761 | Demolished 1830 | |
| Lavenham | TL 915 499 | Tower | | 1831 | 1920; Windmill World | |
| Lavenham | | | | | Blown down 1795 | |
| Lavenham | TL 917 483 | Post | 1783 | 1783 | Gone by 1883 | |
| Lavenham | TL 916 499 | Tower | 1824 | 1824 | Gone by 1883 | |
| Lawshall | Golden Lane Mill; TL 847 551 | Post | 1824 | 1824 | 1824 | |
| Laxfield | Mill Field Mill approximately TM 295 741 | Post | | | | |
| Laxfield | Winks Lane Mill; TM 300 723 | Post | 1783 | 1769 | 1783 | |
| Laxfield | Banyard's Green Mill; TM 304 730 | Post | 1826 | 1826 | 1826 | |
| Laxfield | TM 293 722 | Post | 1736 | 1736 | Demolished c. 1941 | |
| Laxfield | | Post | | | Blown down 1823 | |
| Lavenham | Gorham's Mill; TM 295 728 | Smock | | 1842 | 1939 | |
| Layham | TM 025 393 | Post | 1826 | 1826 | Gone by 1884 | |
| Layham | TM 038 402 | Tower | 1824 | 1824 | Demolished c. 1900 | |
| Leavenheath | TL 955 372 | Post | 1805 | 1805 | Demolished March 1925 | |
| Leiston | Monastic Mill approximately TM 447 625 | Post | | 1608 | Demolished c. 1870 | |
| Leiston | Valley Road Mill; TM 446628 | Smock | 1837 | 1837 | Demolished 1917 | |
| Leiston | TM 444 628 | Tower | 1881 | 1881 | Gone by 1903 | |
| Leiston | Minsmere Levels; TM 475 659 | Smock | 1897 | Mid-19th century | Collapsed c. 1924 | |
| Leiston | Minsmere Levels; TM 475 659 | Titt iron wind engine | | c. 1924 | | |
| Leiston | Sea Wall Mill, Minsmere Levels; TM 477 662 | Smock | 1826 | 1826 | Collapsed 1976 | |
| Leiston | Eastbridge Windpump, Minsmere Levels; TM 468 662 | Smock | 1903 | c. 1870s | Collapsed 1977 | |
| Leiston | Sizewell House; TM 474 645 | Titt iron wind engine | 1897 | 1891 | 1938 | |
| Leiston | Sizewell; TM 475 621 | Titt iron wind engine | 1897 | 1892 | 1897 | |
| Leiston | Sizewell; TM 474 641 | | 1884 | 1884 | Gone by 1903 | |
| Letheringham | TM 280 580 | Post | 1826 | 1826 | Moved to Charsfield | |
| Levington | Levington Heath; TM 245 403 | Post | 1783 | 1783 | 1783 | |
| Lidgate | TL 718 576 | | 1824 | 1824 | Gone by 1884 | |
| Little Glemham | TM 357 584 | Post | 1824 | 1824 | Body moved to Theberton | |
| Little Stonham | TM 114 600 | Tower | 1884 | 1884 | Demolished c. 1928; Windmill World | |
| Little Thurlow | TL 675 516 | Post | 1736 | 1736 | 1736 | |
| Little Thurlow | TL 677 507 | Smock | | 1865 | c. 1909 | |
| Little Waldingfield | TL 918 447 | Post | 1693; 1824 | 1693 | 1824 | |
| Little Wratting | TL 699 471 | | | c. 1869 | c. 1869 | |
| Long Melford | TL 857 465 | Post | | 1758 | Demolished c. 1887 | |
| Lound | TG 498 005 | Post | 1736 | 1736 | Demolished 1837 | |
| Lound | Lound Mill; TG 498 005 | Tower | | 1837 | Windmill World | |
| Lowestoft | Gunton Mill approximately TM 584 944 | Post | 1650 | 1650 | 1751 | |
| Lowestoft | Lighthouse Hill (two mills); TM 551 942 | | | | Both burnt down 30 July 1780 | |
| Lowestoft | Church Road Mill; TM 544 942 | Tower | 1751 | 1751 | Demolished c. 1899 | |
| Lowestoft | Cleveland's Mill - Mill Road; TM 543 924 | Tower | 1803 | 1803 | 1803 | |
| Lowestoft | Foxe's Mill - Clifton Road; TM 543 922 | Tower | 1826 | 1826 | 1826 | |
| Lowestoft | Approximately; TM 551 946 | | 1736 | 1736 | 1736 | |
| Lowestoft | Brickworks - Fir Lane; TM 532 939 | | 1882 | 1882 | 1882 | |
| Lowestoft | Brickworks - Hervey Street; TM 543 930 | | 1837; 1863 | 1837 | 1863, gone by 1882 | |

=== M ===
For Minsmere see Leiston

| Location | Name of mill and grid reference | Type | Maps | First mention or built | Last mention or demise | Photograph |
|---|---|---|---|---|---|---|
| Market Weston | TL 980 775 | Post | | 1807 | Demolished c. 1911 | |
| Marlesford | TM 330 581 | Post | 1824 | 1824 | c. 1896 | |
| Martlesham | TM 249 464 | Tower | | 1820 | Demolished c. 1890 | |
| Mellis | Mellis Green Mill; TM 086 738 | Post | 1783 | 1783 | Demolished c. 1898 | |
| Melton | TM 275 506 | Post | | c. 1800 | 1831 | |
| Melton | Approximately; TM 286 512 | | | 1801 | | |
| Mendham | | Post | | 1802 | 1805 | |
| Mendlesham | Mill Terrace; TM 096 634 | Post | 1824 | 1824 | Gone by 1884 | |
| Mendlesham | approximately TM 102 660 | Smock | | 1781 | 1781 | |
| Mendlesham | Ling's Mill; TM 090 634 | Post | 1783 | 1783 | Demolished c. 1918 | |
| Mendlesham | Kersey's Mill; TM 092 638 | Post | | | Demolished 1927 | |
| Mendlesham | Kent's Mill; TM 102 656 | Post | 1824 | 1824 | Demolished 1910 or 1913 | |
| Mendlesham | Mendlesham Green Mill approximately TM 098 630 | Post | 1824 | 1824 | 1824 | |
| Metfield | TM 295 806 | Post | 1824 | 1824 | 1824 | |
| Metfield | Ball's Mill; TM 300 798 | Post | 1783 | 1783 | Demolished c. 1914; Windmill World | |
| Metfield | Ball's Mill; Office Farm Mill; TM 302 793 | Tower | | 1839 | Demolished 1916; Windmill World | |
| Mettingham | TM 363 905 | Post | | 1826 | 1826, gone by 1836 | |
| Middleton | TM 427 676 | Post | 1783 | 1783 | Demolished 1913 | |
| Mildenhall | White Top Mill; TL 619 811 | Smock | 1783 | 1783 | 1927 | |
| Mildenhall | White Top Mill; TL 620 812 | | 1820 | 1820 | 1885 | |
| Mildenhall | Cross Bank Mill; TL 623 806 | Smock | 1824 | 1824 | 1905 | |
| Mildenhall | TL 623 801 | | 1783 | 1783 | Gone by 1885 | |
| Mildenhall | Approximately; TL 624 799 | | 1783 | 1783 | 1783 | |
| Mildenhall | Approximately; TL 629 790 | | 1783 | 1783 | Gone by 1885 | |
| Mildenhall | Approximately; TL 631 790 | | 1783 | 1783 | 1783 | |
| Mildenhall | Middle Mill; TL 631 786 | Smock | 1820 | 1820 | 1905; Windmill World | |
| Mildenhall | Mill Drain Mill; TL 637 774 | | 1820 | 1820 | Gone by 1885 | |
| Mildenhall | West Row Mill; TL 662 753 | | 1836 | 1836 | Gone by 1885 | |
| Monewden | TM 241 585 | Post | 1837 | 1837 | Demolished c. 1928 | |
| Monks Eleigh | TL 974 474 | Post | 1783 | 1783 | 1783 | |
| Monks Eleigh | TL 963 481 | Post | 1837 | 1837 | 1837 | |
| Monls Eleigh | TL 965 480 | Post | 1799 | 1799 | 1799 | |
| Monk Soham | Broadway Mill; TM 207 658 | Composite | 1837 | 1837 | Moved within Monk Soham by 1883 | |
| Monk Soham | Oak Mill; TM 207 663 | Composite | | 1883 | Demolished November 1937 | |
| Monk Soham | Approximately; TM 199 670 | | 1824 | 1824 | 1824 | |
| Mutford | TM 486 881 | Post | 1826 | 1826 | Demolished 1922 or 1923 | |

=== N ===
| Location | Name of mill and grid reference | Type | Maps | First mention or built | Last mention or demise | Photograph |
|---|---|---|---|---|---|---|
| Nacton | TM 221 406 | Post | 1826 | 1826 | Burnt down 14 August 1873. | |
| Nedging | TL 993 477 | | 1805 | 1805 | Gone by 1884 | |
| Nedging | Naughton Mill; TM 017 496 | Post | 1824 | 1824 | Burnt down 1909 | |
| Needham Market | TM 085 556 | Smock | 1764 | 1764 | Demolished c. 1880 | |
| Newmarket | Approximately; TL 640 630 | Post | | 1669 | 1669 | |
| Newmarket | Langley's Mill; TL 637 638 | Smock | | 1780 | Demolished 1934 | |
| Newton | Newton Green Mill; TL 919 402 | Smock | 1826 | 1826 | 1885 | |
| North Cove | TM 465 911 | Tower | 1883 | 1883 | 1934 | |
| North Cove | Black Mill; TM 470 912 | | 1883 | 1883 | 1883 | |
| North Cove | TM 476 919 | | 1783 | 1783 | 1783 | |
| North Cove | Castle Mill; TM 479 922 | | 1837 | 1837 | Gone by 1883 | |
| Norton | TL 956 656 | Post | | 1806 | 1806 | |
| Norton | The Street; TL 957 671 | Post | 1837 | 1837 | Demolished c. 1906 | |
| Nowton | | | | 1286 | 1286 | |

=== O ===
| Location | Name of mill and grid reference | Type | Maps | First mention or built | Last mention or demise | Photograph |
|---|---|---|---|---|---|---|
| Oakley | TM 170 769 | Post | 1736 | 1736 | Moved to Bedingfield 1828 | |
| Occold | TM 156 705 | | 1826 | 1826 | 1826 | |
| Occold | TM 156 705 | Smock | | | Demolished 1921; Windmill World | |
| Offton | TM073495 | Post | | 1866 | | |
| Offton | Approximately; TM 073 494 | Post | | 1866 | | |
| Old Newton | TM 055 623 | Post | 1783 | 1783 | 1783 | |
| Old Newton | Ward Green Mill; TM 048 643 | Smock | 1837 | 1837 | Demolished c. 1896 | |
| Onehouse | Union Mill; TM 032 591 | Post | | 1802 | 1882 | |
| Orford | | | | 1165 | 1165 | |
| Orford | (three mills) | Post | 1588 | 1588 | 1588 | |
| Orford | TM 418 506 | Post | 1736 | 1736 | Demolished 1913 | |
| Orford | Black Mill; TM 422 503 | Post | 1820 | 1820 | Burnt down c. 1886 | |
| Orford | | Post | | | Body moved to Saxtead Green | |
| Otley | TM 195 552 | Post | 1837 | 1837 | Moved to Mendlesham | |
| Otley | Chestnuts' Mill; TM 213 562 | Smock | 1824 | 1824 | Demolished c. 1908 | |
| Otley | Davey's Mill; TM 203 551 | Post | 1837 | 1837 | Demolished c. 1912 | |
| Oulton | Skepper's Mill; TM 502 937 | Trestle | 1836 | 1835 | 1882, gone by 1903 | |
| Oulton | Arnold's Mill; TM 501 945 | Tower | 1783 | 1783 | 1903 | |
| Oulton Broad | Lady Mill; TM 522 930 | Tower | 1736 | 1736 | Demolished October 1932 | |
| Oulton Broad | Knight's Mill; TM 521 930 | Tower | 1841 | 1841 | gone by 1903 | |
| Oulton Broad | TM 516 928 | Tower | | | | |
| Ousden | TL 724 598 | Smock | 1826 | 1826 | Collapsed c. 1880 | |
| Ousden | TL 725 599 | Post | 1826 | 1826 | Blown down, gone by 1914 | |

=== P ===
| Location | Name of mill and grid reference | Type | Maps | First mention or built | Last mention or demise | Photograph |
|---|---|---|---|---|---|---|
| Pakefield | TM 536 904 | Post | 1783 | 1783 | Demolished 1888 | |
| Pakenham | Approximately; TL 936 696 | | 1783 | 1783 | 1783 | |
| Pakenham | Approximately; TL 917 676 | | 1824 | 1824 | 1824 | |
| Pakenham | Pakenham Mill; TL 931 694 | Tower | | 1831 | Windmill World | |
| Palgrave | Mill Lane Mill; TM 116 781 | Smock | 1837 | 1837 | Moved to Botesdale by 1885 | |
| Palgrave | TM 122 776 | Smock | | 1803 | Demolished late 1930s or c. 1957 | |
| Parham | Mill Green Mill; TM 313 612 | Post | | 1821 | Demolished 1944 | |
| Peasenhall | TM 351 695 | Post | | 1803 | Demolished c. 1957 | |
| Pettaugh | TM 167 595 | Post | 1783 | 1783 | Demolished 1865 | |
| Pettaugh | TM 167 595 | Post | | 1865 | Demolished December 1957 | |
| Pettistree | TM 305 552 | Tower | 1820 | 1820 | Demolished c. 1898 | |
| Polstead | Bower House Tye Mill; TL 990 411 | Post | 1883 | 1883 | 1883 | |
| Polstead | TL 988 375 | Post | 1805 | 1805 | 1805 | |
| Preston St Mary | Approximately; TL 943 509 | Smock | 1826 | 1826 | 1826 | |
| Preston St Mary | TL 940 507 | Post | 1824 | 1824 | Gone by 1902 | |
| Preston St Mary | TL 941 507 | Post | 1824 | 1824 | Gone by 1883 | |
| Preston St Mary | TL 942 508 | Tower | | 1846 | Demolished 1928 | |

=== R ===
| Location | Name of mill and grid reference | Type | Maps | First mention or built | Last mention or demise | Photograph |
|---|---|---|---|---|---|---|
| Rattlesden | Mill Hill Mill; TL 976 590 | Post | | 1805 | 1805 | |
| Rattlesden | TL 976 590 | Tower | | | Demolished c. 1918 | |
| Rattlesden | TL 968 583 | Smock | 1783 | 1783 | demolished c. 1900 | |
| Rattlesden | Rattlesden Mill; TL 968 582 | Tower | | c. 1850 | 1935, later truncated Windmill World | |
| Raydon | | | | 1793 | 1793 | |
| Redgrave | Approximately; TM 038 788 | | 1826 | 1826 | 1826 | |
| Redgrave | TM 039786 | Post | 1783 | 1783 | Demolished c. 1903 | |
| Redgrave | TM 039 782 | Tower | 1824 | 1824 | Burnt down 1923 | |
| Redlingfield | Mill Farm Mill; TM 182 713 | Post | 1824 | 1824 | Blown down 18 January 1881 | |
| Reydon | | Post | | c. 1800 | Burnt down by 1803 | |
| Reydon | Blackshore Mill; TM 491 759 | Tower | | c. 1890 | | |
| Rickinghall Inferior | North Mill; TM 039 759 | Post | 1783 | 1783 | Burnt down c. 1885 | |
| Rishangles | Wright's Mill; TM 164 674 | Post | 1783 | 1783 | Wrecked in gale 13 June 1826, rebuilt as composite mill | |
| Rishangles | Wright's Mill; TM 164 674 | Composite | | 1826 | Burnt down 21 February 1903 | |
| Rougham | Mill Heath Mill; TL 916 644 | Post | 1698 | 1698 | Demolished c. 1770 | |
| Rougham | Mill Heath Mill; TL 916 644 | Post | | 1770 | Demolished 1940s or 1950s Windmill World | |
| Rumburgh | TM 348 812 | Post | | 1814 | Blown down 1 December 1867. | |
| Rushmere St Andrew | TM 201 457 | Smock | | 1814 | Burnt down 1939 | |

=== S ===
For Saxtead Green see Framlingham
For Sizewell see Leiston

| Location | Name of mill and grid reference | Type | Maps | First mention or built | Last mention or demise | Photograph |
|---|---|---|---|---|---|---|
| Sapiston | Approximately; TL 924 744 | Post | 1736 | 1736 | Moved 1853 | |
| Saxmundham | | | | 1767 | 1767 | |
| Saxmundham | TM 383 631 | Post | 1824 | 1824 | Demolished March 1907; Windmill World | |
| Shadingfield | TM 484 848 | Post | 1764 | 1764 | Demolished c. 1905 | |
| Shadingfield | TM 411 844 | Smock | | c. 1840 | Demolished c. 1938 | |
| Shimpling | Approximately; TL 863 524 | Post | 1783 | 1783 | 1783 | |
| Shimpling | Mill Hill Mill; TL 859 519 | Post | 1783 | 1783 | Moved to Alpheton c. 1875 | |
| Shimpling | The Street; TL 872 530 | Smock | | 1792 | Demolished 1935; Windmill World | |
| Shotley | | Post | | 1730 | 1730 | |
| Shotley | TM 224 361 | Tower | 1826 | 1826 | Demolished early 1930s | |
| Shottisham | TM 320 445 | Post | 1838 | 1838 | 1838 | |
| Sibton | TM 366 693 | Post | 1736 | 1736 | Demolished c. 1922 - Roundhouse remains Windmill World | |
| Snape | Turning Mill; TM 403 584 | | | c. 1828 | | |
| Snape | Markin's Mill; TM 400 582 | Post | 1824 | 1824 | Demolished 1922 | |
| Snape | TM 394 583 | Post | | 1668 | Demolished c. 1797 | |
| Snape | Hudson's Mill; TM 394 583 | | 1797 | Demolished July 1933; Windmill World | | |
| Somerleyton | TM 418 969 | Post | 1783 | 1783 | Demolished c. 1880 | |
| Somerleyton | TM 480 959 | Tower | 1837 | 1837 | Demolished early 20th century | |
| Somersham | TM 085 485 | Post | | 1811 | 1881 | |
| Sotterley | Hulver Street Mill; TM 466 868 | Post | 1736 | 1736 | Gone by 1914 | |
| Sotterley | Sotterley Brickworks; TM 450 842 | | 1883 | 1883 | Gone by 1903 | |
| Southwold | White Mill; Town Mill; Corporation Mill; TM 504 760 | Post | | 1723 | 1723 | |
| Southwold | Black Mill; TM 504 762 | Post | | 1798 | Wrecked in gale November 1863 | |
| Southwold | Black Mill; Great Mill; TM 504 762 | Post | | '1864 | Demolished 1894 | |
| Southwold | Baggott's Mill; TM 509 762 | Post | | 1841 | Burnt down 1876 | |
| Southwold | Salt works TM 507 757 | Hollow Post | | | 1938 | |
| Southwold | Southwold Common; TM 502 763 | Titt iron wind engine | | c. 1886 | 1938 | |
| Stansfield | TL 785 528 | | 1783 | 1783 | Demolished 1840 | |
| Stansfield | Stansfield Mill; TL 785 528 | Tower | | 1840 | Windmill World | |
| Stanstead | TL 844 490 | Post | 1799 | 1799 | Blown down c. 1915 | |
| Stanton | | | | 1393 | 1394 | |
| Stanton | Bury Lane Mill; TL 973 731 | Post | 1824 | 1824 | 1882 | |
| Stanton | Upthorpe Mill; TL 971 733 | Post | | 1751 | Windmill World | |
| Stanton | TL 962 736 | Smock | 1764 | 1764 | Demolished 1940s | |
| Stanton | Stanton Chair Mill; George Hill Mill; TL 963 742 | Post | | 1824 | 1915; Windmill World | |
| Stanton | Lower Mill | | | | Moved 1818 | |
| St Cross, South Elmham | Sancroft Mill; TM 297 836 | | 1826 | 1826 | Gone by 1883 | |
| St James, South Elmham | TM 320 814 | Post | | 1864 | Demolished June 1923; Windmill World | |
| St Michael, South Elmham | TM 338 841 | Post | | 1799 | Demolished 1955 or 1956 | |
| (one of the South Elmhams) | | Post | | | Moved to Fressingfield 1792 | |
| Stoke Ash | TM 114 694 | Post | 1764 | 1764 | Burnt down 1883 | |
| Stoke by Clare | Approximately; TL 737 438 | | 1783 | 1783 | 1783 | |
| Stoke by Clare | TL 724 435 | Tower | 1824 | 1824 | Demolished c. 1890 | |
| Stoke by Clare | TL 744 438 | Post | 1824 | 1824 | Demolished 1892 | |
| Stoke by Nayland | TM 012 357 | | | | 1884 | |
| Stoke by Nayland | Approximately; TM 007 362 | | 1783 | 1783 | 1783 | |
| Stoke by Nayland | Withermarsh Green Mill; TM 006 369 | Post | 1824 | 1824 | Moved to Polstead c. 1875 | |
| Stonham Aspal | Mill Green Mill; TM 137 603 | Post | 1826 | 1826 | Demolished 1909 | |
| Stowmarket | (two mills south of the town) | | 1675 | 1675 | 1675 | |
| Stowmarket | TM 046 593 | Post | 1824 | 1824 | Gone by 1884 | |
| Stowmarket | TM 044 593 | Post | 1824 | 1824 | 1903 | |
| Stowmarket | TM 044 594 | Post | 1824 | 1824 | 1903 | |
| Stowmarket | Fison's Mill; TM 042 585 | Smock | 1824 | 1824 | Burnt down 1884 | |
| Stowmarket | Eastbridge Windpump; TM 045 580 | Smock | | 1979 | | |
| Stowupland | Approximately; TM 074 600 | Post | | | | |
| Stowupland | Mill Street Mill approximately TM 066 591 | | | | | |
| Stowupland | TM 063 598 | Post | | 1802 | Demolished 1866 | |
| Stowupland | Stowupland Green Mill; TM 067 598 | Tower | 1824 | 1824 | Demolished 1919 | |
| Stradbroke | Battlesea Green Mill; TM 223 754 | Post | 1813 | 1813 | Burnt down 1898 | |
| Stradbroke | Barley Green Mill; TM 240 740 | Post | | c. 1704 | Demolished 1941; Windmill World | |
| Stradbroke | Skinner's Mill; TM 228 743 | Post | | 1688 | Demolished 1941 or 1942 | |
| Stratford St Andrew | TM 356 602 | Post | 1824 | 1824 | Demolished 1905 or 1906; Windmill World | |
| Sudbury | Approximately; TL 882 419 | Post | | 1614 | 1714 | |
| Sudbury | TL 880 414 | Post | 1805 | 1805 | Moved to Assington 1868 | |
| Sudbury | TL 873 417 | Tower | 1824 | 1824 | 1824 | |
| Sudbury | TL 871 417 | Tower | 1824 | 1824 | 1824 | |
| Sudbury | Highfield Mill; TL 866 429 | Smock | | 1855 | Demolished 1919 | |
| Sutton | TM 317 458 | Post | 1838 | 1838 | Blown down c. 1916 | |
| Swefling | Girling's Mill; TM 348 639 | Post | | 1775 | Demolished September 1935; Windmill World | |
| Swefling | Middle Mill; TM 350 640 | Post | 1783 | 1783 | 1900, demolished 1900s | |
| Swefling | High Mill; Rachael; TM 351 640 | Post | 1783 | 1783 | Demolished 1911 or 1912; Windmill World | |
| Swilland | TM 190 538 | Post | 1824 | 1824 | Demolished c. 1953; Windmill World | |
| Syleham | Syleham Mill; TM 214 777 | Post | | 1823 | Blown down 16 October 1987; Windmill World | |

=== T, U ===
| Location | Name of mill and grid reference | Type | Maps | First mention or built | Last mention or demise | Photograph |
|---|---|---|---|---|---|---|
| Tannington | TM 252 681 | Post | | c. 1855 | Blown down 10 August 1879 | |
| Theberton | TM 440 657 | Post | | | | |
| Theberton | TM 440 657 | Tower | | 1756 | Demolished c. 1923; Windmill World | |
| Thelnetham | Approximately; TM 011 790 | Post | 1783 | 1783 | Moved to Diss, Norfolk 1818 | |
| Thelnetham | Button's Mill; TM 011 790 | Tower | | 1819 | Windmill World | |
| Thorndon | TM 139 698 | Post | | 1797 | Demolished 1924; Windmill World | |
| Thornham Magna | TM 110 711 | Post | 1675 | 1675 | Burnt down 17 May 1959 | |
| Thorpeness | Thorpeness Mill; TM 468 598 | Hollow post | | 1923 | Windmill World | |
| Thorpeness | Kursaal; TM 473 598 | Hollow post | | c. 1911 | | |
| Thurston | TL 916 661 | Post | | 1750 | Demolished c. 1953 | |
| Trimley St Martin | Mill Lane Mill; TM 272 379 | Post | 1783 | 1783 | Blown down 1799 | |
| Trimley St Martin | Mill Lane Mill; TM 272 379 | Post | | c. 1799 | Standing 1918. Demolished early 1920s | |
| Trimley St Martin | Mill Lane Mill; TM 273 380 | Tower | 1881 | 1881 | 1902 | |
| Trimley St Martin | Kirton Road Mill; TM 276 389 | Post | 1807 | 1807 | Demolished 1917 or 1918 | |
| Troston | TL 896 733 | Smock | 1824 | 1824 | Demolished c. 1885 | |
| Tuddenham St Martin | TM 190 484 | Post | | 1782 | Demolished c. 1901 | |
| Tuddenham St Mary | TL 729 720 | Smock | 1783 | 1783 | 1901 | |
| Tunstall | TM 372 548 | Post | | c. 1808 | Demolished 1929 | |
| Ubbeston | TM 319 718 | Post | 1837 | 1837 | Demolished 1924 | |
| Ufford | TM 303 525 | Post | | c. 1840 | Moved to Worlingworth 1848 | |
| Ufford | TM 294 530 | Smock | | c. 1888 | Moved to Hacheston | |
| Ufford | TM 298 532 | Tower | 1820 | 1820 | 1820 | |
| Uggeshall | TM 447 800 | Post | 1736 | 1736 | Demolished 1923 | |

=== W, Y ===
| Location | Name of mill and grid reference | Type | Maps | First mention or built | Last mention or demise | Photograph |
|---|---|---|---|---|---|---|
| Walberswick | TM 496 746 | Post | 1838 | 1838 | Blown down 1924 | |
| Walberswick | Westwood Marshes; TM 487 737 | Tower | 1897 | 1897 | Windmill World | |
| Walberswick | TM 478 762 | | 1903 | 1903 | 1903 | |
| Walberswick | Tinker's Marshes; TM 490 756 | | 1882 | 1882 | Gone by 1925 | |
| Waldringfield | TM 280 444 | Post | | c. 1806 | Demolished c. 1916 | |
| Walpole | TM 366 478 | Post | 1736 | 1736 | Blown down 1919 | |
| Walsham le Willows | Crowland Mill; TM 005 703 | Post | 1783 | 1783 | 1884 | |
| Walsham le Willows | TM 005 718 | Post | 1824 | 1824 | Demolished 1917; Windmill World | |
| Walton | Upper Mill; TM 290 359 | Smock | 1806 | 1804 | | |
| Walton | Ferry Lane Mill; TM 287 344 | Post | 1806 | 1806 | Demolished c. 1858 | |
| Walton | Wadgate Mill; TM 290 345 | Post | 1804 | 1804 | Demolished c. 1890 | |
| Wangford | TM 470 796 | Post | 1736 | 1736 | Demolished c. 1917 | |
| Wangford | TM 468 790 | Smock | 1883 | 1883 | Burnt down 7 August 1928 | |
| Wattisfield | TM 013 745 | Post | 1783 | 1783 | Demolished 1914 | |
| Wenhaston | TM 415 769 | | | 1793 | 1793 | |
| Wenhaston | Blackheath Mill; TM 425 747 | Post | 1783 | 1783 | Demolished c. 1896 | |
| Wenhaston | Kitty Mill; TM 420 758 | Post | 1837 | 1837 | Demolished 1964 or 1967; Windmill World | |
| Westerfield | TM 170 475 | Smock | | 1795 | Moved within Westerfield c. 1819 | |
| Westerfield | TM 170 474 | Smock | | c. 1819 | Gone by 1880 | |
| Westhall | Mill Common Mill; TM 409 816 | Post | 1824 | 1781 | Demolished May 1957 | |
| Westleton | Rouse's Mill; TM 445 683 | Post | 1736 | 1736 | Burnt down c. 1880 | |
| Westleton | TM 444 692 | Post | 1842 | 1842 | Demolished July 1963 | |
| Westleton | Ralph's Mill; TM 444 685 | Smock | 1783 | 1783 | Demolished 1969 | |
| Weston | TM 410 862 | Post | 1837 | 1836 | Burnt down 1896 | |
| West Stow | Sewage works TL 803 712 | Titt iron wind engine | | c. 1898 | | |
| Wetherden | TM 007 630 | Post | 1824 | 1824 | 1914 | |
| Wetherden | Warren Mill; TL 997 629 | Post | 1764 | 1764 | Demolished c. 1907 | |
| Wetheringsett | Old Mill Green Mill; TM 131 630 | Post | 1783 | 1783 | Demolished 1919 | |
| Wetheringsett | Broad Green Mill; TM 145 649 | Post | 1826 | 1826 | Blown down 18 January 1881; Windmill World | |
| Wetheringsett | Broad Green Mill; TM 145 649 | Post | | 1882 | Demolished 1957 | |
| Wetheringsett | Brockford Green Mill approximately TM 124 653 | Post | 1824 | 1824 | 1824 | |
| Weybread | Shotford Heath approximately TM 246 815 | Post | 1736 | 1736 | 1794 | |
| Weybread | Shotford Heath; TM 224 795 | Post | 1826 | 1826 | 1826 | |
| Weybread | TM 232 808 | Post | 1826 | 1826 | Moved to Framsden c. 1882 | |
| Weybread | TM 256 799 | Post | 1826 | 1826 | Moved within Weybread | |
| Weybread | Dranes' Farm Mill; TM 257 801 | Post | 1884 | 1884 | Demolished c. 1926 | |
| Whatfield | TM 026 465 | Post | | post 1844 | 1884 | |
| Whepstead | Mickley Green Mill; TL 841 579 | Post | 1783 | 1783 | Burnt down 1894 | |
| Whitton | TM 143 475 | Tower | 1838 | 1838 | 1892 | |
| Wickhambrook | Bullock's Mill; TL 743 552 | Post | 1836 | 1836 | Demolished 1909 | |
| Wickhambrook | Great Mill; TL 751 540 | Post | | 1740 | Demolished 1966 | |
| Wickhambrook | Fuller's Mill; TL 756 555 | Post | | c. 1850 | Demolished c. 1920 | |
| Wickhambrook | Baxter's Green Mill approximately TL 762 583 | Post | 1824 | 1824 | Moved to Beyton c. 1830 | |
| Wickham Market | Charsfield Road; TM 298 562 | | 1824 | 1824 | Gone by 1881 | |
| Wickham Market | Charsfield Road; TM 299 562 | | 1824 | 1824 | Gone by 1881 | |
| Wickham Market | Mill Lane; TM 305 556 | Smock | | 1774 | Demolished c. 1885; Windmill World | |
| Wickham Market | Mill Lane; TM 305 566 | Tower | 1783 | 1783 | Demolished 1868 | |
| Wickham Skeith | Wickham Street; TM 093 697 | Post | 1826 | 1826 | Moved to Wickham Green | |
| Wickham Skeith | Wickham Green approximately TM 092 693 | Post | | | Demolished 1881 | |
| Wickham Skeith | TM 094 692 | Tower | | c. 1870 | Demolished March 1925 | |
| Wingfield | Earsham Street; TM 234 782 | Post | 1837 | 1837 | Demolished c. 1910 | |
| Wingfield | Earsham Street; TM 234 782 | Post | | | Moved to Syleham 1823 | |
| Wissett | TM 375 786 | Post | 1837 | 1837 | Demolished c. 1920 | |
| Withersfield | TL 658 742 | Post | 1783 | 1783 | Demolished c. 1910 | |
| Witnesham | Wood Farm Mill; TM 183 519 | Post | 1826 | 1826 | Demolished c. 1888 | |
| Witnesham | TM 183 504 | Post | | c. 1815 | Burnt down c. 1908 | |
| Woodbridge | Mill Hills; TM 270 494 | Post | 1783 | 1783 | Moved to Ramsey, Essex 1842 | |
| Woodbridge | Mill Hills; TM 271 494 | Post | 1783 | 1783 | Moved to Butley 1841 or Southwold 1842 | |
| Woodbridge | Mill Hills; TM 270 495 | Post | 1783 | 1783 | Moved to Butley 1841 or Southwold 1842 | |
| Woodbridge | Mill Hills; TM 270 496 | Post | | 1819 | 1866 | |
| Woodbridge | Victoria Road Mill; TM 274 494 | Tower | | c. 1825 | 1841 | |
| Woodbridge | Drybridge Hill Mill; TM 263 491 | Post | 1820 | 1820 | 1820 | |
| Woodbridge | Theatre Street Mill; TM 268 491 | Post | | | | |
| Woodbridge | Buttrum's Mill; TM 264 493 | Tower | | 1816 | Windmill World | |
| Woodbridge | Tricker's Mill; TM 268 491 | Tower | | 1815 | Windmill World | |
| Woolpit | Approximately; TL 995 622 | Post | | c. 1568 | c. 1568 | |
| Woolpit | Pyke's Mill; TL 976 622 | Post | | 1644 | Demolished 1924 | |
| Woolpit | Elmer's Mill; TL 968 627 | Post | 1675 | 1675 | Collapsed September 1963 | |
| Worlingham | TM 453 914 | Tower | 1836 | 1836 | 1849, gone by 1883 | |
| Worlingworth | Old Mill; TM 213 688 | Post | 1783 | 1783 | Demolished c. 1914 | |
| Worlingworth | New Mill; TM 212 688 | Post | | 1848 | Demolished 1952; Windmill World | |
| Wortham | Magpie Green Mill; TM 070 784 | Post | 1881 | 1881 | Moved to Walsham le Willows c. 1890 | |
| Wortham | Wortham Ling; TM 091 796 | Post | 1783 | 1783 | Demolished 1917 | |
| Wortham | TM 081 768 | Smock | 1826 | c. 1700 | Wrecked in gale 18 January 1881 | |
| Wortham | TM 081 768 | Smock | | c. 1881 | Demolished 1948 | |
| Wrentham | Mill Lane Mill approximately TM 503 826 | Post | 1736 | 1736 | Moved within Wrentham by 1783 | |
| Wrentham | Fletcher's Mill; TM 496 822 | Post | 1783 | 1783 | Blown down 1931 | |
| Wrentham | Carter's Mill; TM 499 819 | Post | 1824 | 1824 | Demolished 1955 | |
| Wrentham | TM 499 823 | Tower | 1837 | 1837 | Demolished 1964 | |
| Wyverstone | TM 035 673 | Post | 1837 | 1837 | 1837 | |
| Wyverstone | Black mill TM 031 677 | Post | 1884 | 1884 | 1884 | |
| Yaxley | TM 121 737 | Tower | 1824 | 1824 | Burnt down c. 1885 | |
| Yoxford | TM 395 681 | Post | 1764 | 1764 | 1764 | |
| Yoxford | TM 396 682 | Post | | c. 1813 | 1910 | |
| Yoxford | Approximately; TM 395 687 | | 1783 | 1783 | 1783 | |

== Mill bodies ==
A number of post mill bucks, and one smock mill body were moved and re-erected after they had ceased to be used as windmills.

| Location | Type | Notes |
|---|---|---|
| Creeting St Mary; TM 091 553 | Post | The body of Creeting St Mary Windmill was moved to Alder Carr Farm c. 1860. It is the only surviving post mill body. |
| Framlingham (Saxtead) | Post | The body of a hollow post drainage mill was moved from Aldeburgh or Orford and set up in the mill yard of Saxted Green Mill, it was later moved across the road to the yard of a millwright and was still standing in 1938. |
| Hundon | Post | The body of Mansfield's Mill was retained after the mill was demolished. |
| Peasenhall; TM 351 695 | Smock | Moved to Peasenhall c. 1882. Smock tower and cap incorporated into a steam mill. Standing as of 2011. Windmill World |
| Theberton | Post | The body of Little Glemham mill was moved to Theberton and set up as a steam mill driving one pair of millstones. |
| Walsham le Willows | Post | The body of Magpie Green Mill, Wortham was moved to Walsham le Willows and set up alongside the windmill as a steam mill. |
| Westhall | Post | The top part of the body of Aldridge's Mill, Huntingfield was moved to Westhall Common in 1928. |
| Worlingworth | Post | The body of Cross Street Mill, Hoxne was moved to Worlingworth and set up as a steam mill. Demolished c. 1910. |

== Locations formerly within Suffolk ==
- For mills in Belton, Bradwell, Burgh Castle, Cobholm and Southtown see List of windmills in Norfolk.
- For drainage mills in Belton and Fritton see List of drainage windmills in Norfolk.

== Maps ==
- 1588 Anonymous
- 1675 Ogilby
- 1724 John Warburton, Joseph Bland & Payler Smith
- 1736 John Kirby
- 1777John Chapman & Peter André
- 1783 Joseph Hodgkinson
- 1825 C & J Greenwood
- 1826 Andrew Bryant
- 1837 Ordnance Survey
- 1838 Ordnance Survey
- 1883 Ordnance Survey

== Notes ==
Mills in bold are still standing, known building dates are indicated in bold. Text in italics denotes indicates that the information is not confirmed, but is likely to be the case stated.

== Sources ==
Unless otherwise indicated, the source for all entries is Flint, Brian (1979). Suffolk Windmills. Woodbridge: Boydell. ISBN 0-85115-112-4.

- **^1**Dolman, Peter (1978). Windmills in Suffolk. Ipswich: Suffolk Mills Group. ISBN 0-9506447-0-6.
