= Walton Windmill =

Walton Windmill may refer to a number of windmills in the United Kingdom.

- Savage's Mill, Walton on the Naze, Essex
- Archer's Mill, Walton on the Naze, Essex
- Stanley Park Mill, Walton, Liverpool, Lancashire
- Upper Mill, Walton, Suffolk
- Wadgate Mill, Walton, Suffolk
- Walton on Thames windmill, Surrey
