= Upper Mill =

Uppermill or Upper Mill may refer to:

== United Kingdom ==
=== Places ===
Uppermill, a village near Saddleworth, Greater Manchester.

=== Windmills ===
- Upper Mill, Brundish, a windmill in Suffolk
- Upper Mill, Combs, a windmill in Suffolk
- Upper Mill, Eastry. a windmill in Kent
- Upper Mill, Great Baddow, a windmill in Essex
- Upper Mill, Hailsham, a windmill in East Sussex
- Upper Mill, Hindringham, a windmill in Norfolk
- Upper Mill, Hockwold, a drainage mill in Norfolk
- Upper Mill, Walton, a windmill in Suffolk
- Upper Mill, Woodchurch, a windmill in Kent

=== Watermills ===
- Upper Mill, East Malling, a watermill on the East Malling Stream, Kent
- Upper Mill, Loose, a watermill on the Loose Stream, Kent
- Upper Mill, Oxted, a watermill on the River Eden, Surrey
- Upper Mill, Shoreham, a watermill on the River Darent, Kent
- Upper Mill, Ulcombe, a watermill on a tributary of the River Beult, Kent
- Upper Mill, Wateringbury, a watermill on the Wateringbury Stream, Kent
- Upper Paper Mill, St Mary's Cray, a watermill on the River Cray, Kent

== United States ==
- Russell Company Upper Mill, Middletown, CT, listed on the NRHP in Connecticut
- Owings Upper Mill, Owings Mills, MD, listed on the NRHP in Maryland
- Buck's Upper Mill Farm, Bucksville, SC, listed on the NRHP in South Carolina
