= Bacton Green =

Bacton Green may refer to two places in the United Kingdom:

- Bacton Green, Norfolk, England
- Bacton Green, Suffolk, England
