= Barnham Windmill =

Barnham Windmill may refer to:

- Barnham Windmill, West Sussex
- Barnham Windmill, Suffolk
