= Bungay (disambiguation) =

Bungay is a town in Suffolk, East Anglia, England.

Bungay may also refer to:

== People called Bungay ==
- Frank Bungay (1909–1990), English footballer
- Jasmin Bungay (born 1997), Filipino model
- Reg Bungay (1911–1986), English footballer
- Stephen Bungay (1954–2026), British management consultant, military historian and author
- Thomas Bungay (c. 1214 – c. 1294), English Franciscan friar and scholar in England

== Places and things called Bungay ==
- Bungay railway station in Norfolk, England
- Bungay Castle in Suffolk, England
- RAF Bungay in Suffolk, England
- Bungay Windmill in Suffolk, England
- Bungay language, an Algonquian language in Canada
- Bungay River in Massachusetts, USA
- Tono-Bungay a novel by H G Wells
