= Holton Windmill =

Landmark post mill in Suffolk, England

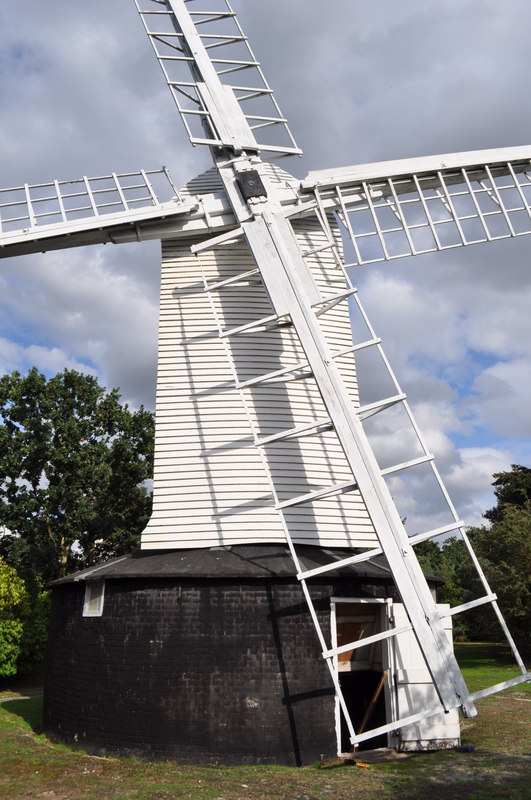
- The mill in 2011

Origin
- Mill name: Holton Mill
- Mill location: TM 402 774
- Coordinates: 52°20′33″N 1°31′31″E
- Operator(s): Suffolk County Council
- Year built: 1749

Information
- Purpose: Corn mill
- Type: Post mill
- Roundhouse storeys: Two storeys
- No. of sails: Four sails
- Type of sails: Two Spring sails, two Common sails
- Windshaft: Cast iron
- Winding: Fantail

Holton Windmill is a Grade II listed post mill at Holton, Suffolk, England which has been preserved as a landmark.

== History ==
Holton Mill was built in 1749 by John Swann. It was owned by William Fiske until he died in 1761, and was then purchased by Brame Oxford. When he was declared bankrupt in 1781 the mill was acquired by James Tillot. It then passed to John Tillot, who died in 1835. The mill was then put up for auction, and was for the first time described as having a roundhouse. It was bought by Samuel Wilkinson, a miller from Blythburgh. Wilkinson sold the mill to John Youngs of Wenhaston in 1851. Youngs died in 1861 and the mill was sold to Andrew Johnstone of Holton Hall. He in turn sold it to Thomas Buxton in 1863. The mill was again for sale in 1886. An engine shed indicated that an auxiliary engine was employed at that time. The mill was last worked in 1910. The mill was then largely stripped of machinery and used as a summer house. A fantail was added about this time.

The mill became derelict over the years, until it was purchased by Colonel T S Irwin in 1947. In 1949 the Holton Mill Preservation Fund Committee was formed, and some repairs were carried out. East Suffolk County Council was leased the mill in the mid 1960s and restoration commenced in 1963.

The restoration was carried out by Mr and Mrs H Fisk, Marcus Cook and Chris Hullcoop. The mill was repainted, with paint donated by ICI. The Society for the Protection of Ancient Buildings entered into talks with East Suffolk County Council and a small grant was given to the volunteers. In 1964, Stanley Freese joined the team. The fantail was repaired and the Spring sails were dismantled as they were unsafe. Neville Martin, the Beccles millwright, inspected the mill for the Ministry of Works. As the mill was not structurally sound enough to be a working mill, it was decided to restore it as a landmark. Four Common sails were fitted; these are lighter than Spring sails. The body of the mill was reinforced by a cantilever beam to support the prick post added when the head of the mill was extended.

By late 1965, the wind could turn the remaining pair of sails. In 1966 there were further repairs, including a complete new roof, reboarding the mill and repairs to the floors. Four new Common sails were fitted. East Suffolk County Council took a new 50-year lease on the mill in March 1966. In 1992, new replica Spring sails were fitted to the mill.

== Description ==
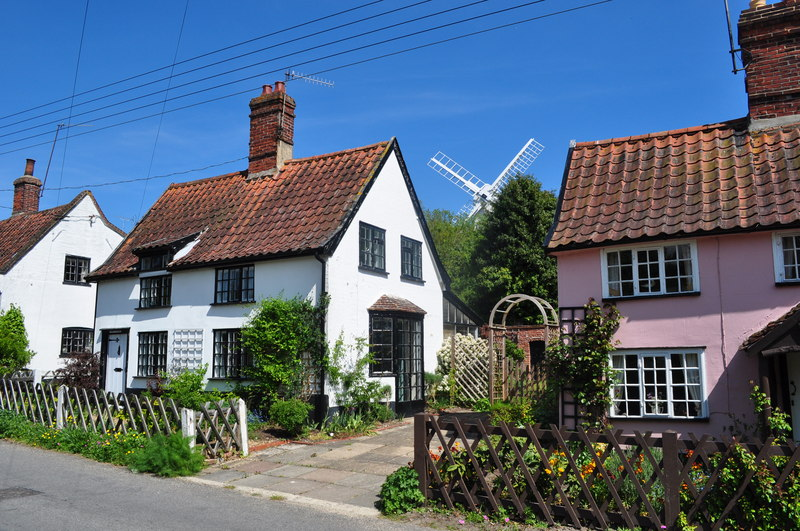
The Mill in 2010

Holton Windmill was built as an open trestle post mill. A roundhouse was added by 1835. The mill was originally winded by a tailpole. A Fantail was added and the mill was also worked by a steam engine. The mill has been extended at the head and the tail. The mill has one pair of Common sails and one pair of Spring sails. Only the cast iron windshaft and Brake Wheel remain of the internal machinery. The roundhouse appears from the outside to have only one storey, but it has been excavated internally to provide two storeys, cellar and ground floor.

== Millers ==
- Samuel Banell 1810s
- William Taylor 1835–1845
- William Wilkinson 1845–1851
- Edward Gotta Young 1851–1870
- William Gibson 1870–1910

Reference for above:-

== Public access ==
The exterior of Holton Mill is open to the public (courtesy of the landowner) and occasionally the interior.
