= Fort Green Mill, Aldeburgh =

Windmill in Aldeburgh, Suffolk, United Kingdom

Aldeburgh Windmill
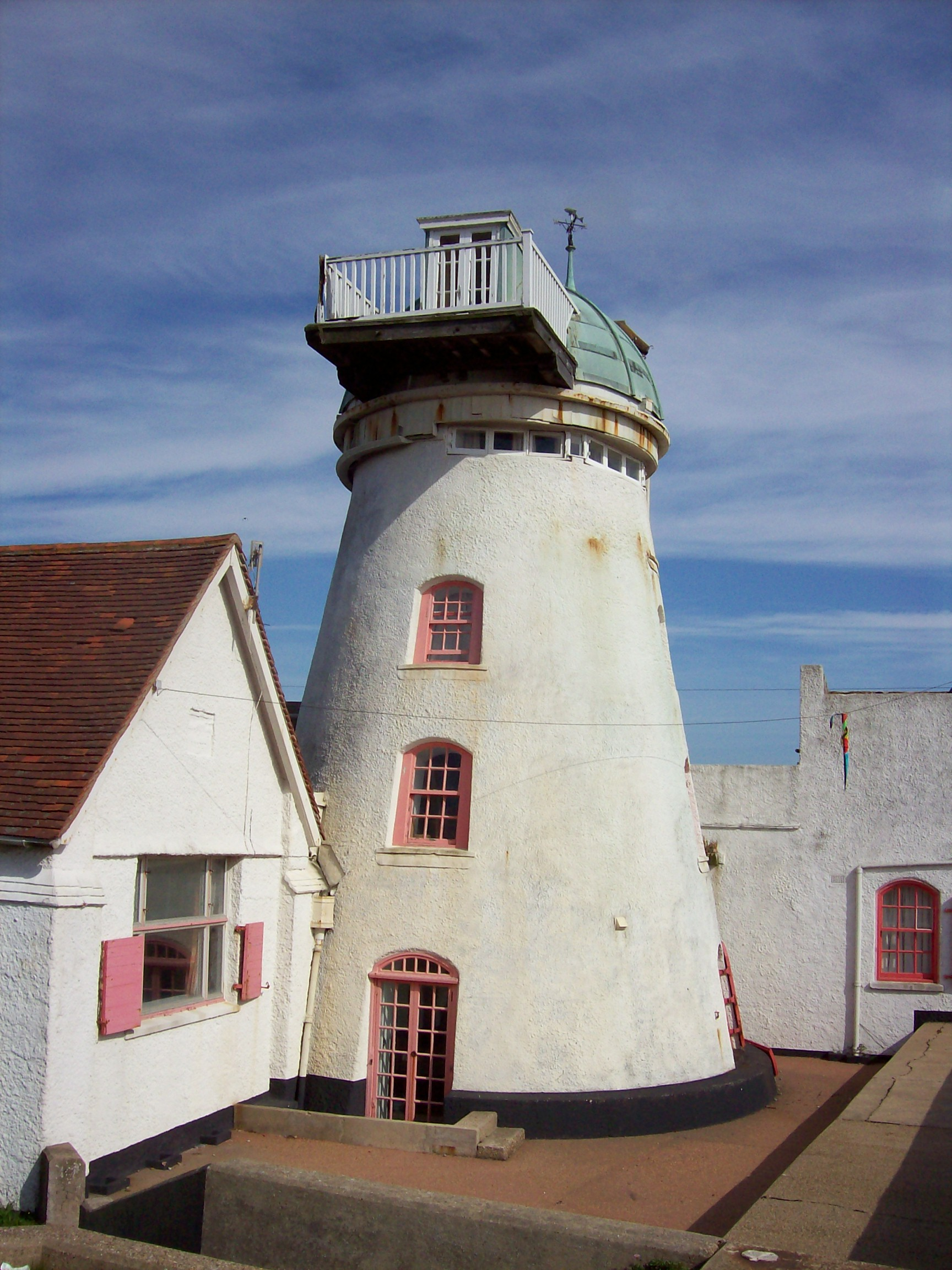
- The mill in 2007
- Interactive map of Aldeburgh Windmill

Origin
- Mill name: Fort Green Mill
- Mill location: TM 464 559
- Coordinates: 52°08′46″N 1°36′09″E
- Operator: Private
- Year built: 1824

Information
- Purpose: Corn mill
- Type: Tower mill
- Storeys: Four storeys
- No. of sails: Four sails
- Type of sails: Patent sails
- Windshaft: Cast iron
- Winding: Fantail
- Fantail blades: Six blades
- No. of pairs of millstones: Two pairs

Fort Green Mill is a tower mill at Aldeburgh, Suffolk, England which has been converted to residential accommodation.

== History ==
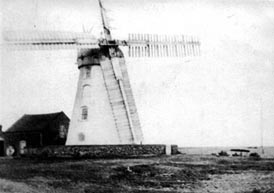
The mill c. 1900

Fort Green Mill was built in 1824. It was converted into a house in 1902. During the Second World War it was used as a gun emplacement.

It was put up for sale in 2016.

== Description ==
Fort Green Mill is a four-storey tower mill. It had four patent sails and the domed cap was winded by a fantail. It had two pairs of millstones. A photograph of the working mill (above) shows that the sails were double patents carried on a cast-iron windshaft and the fantail had six blades.

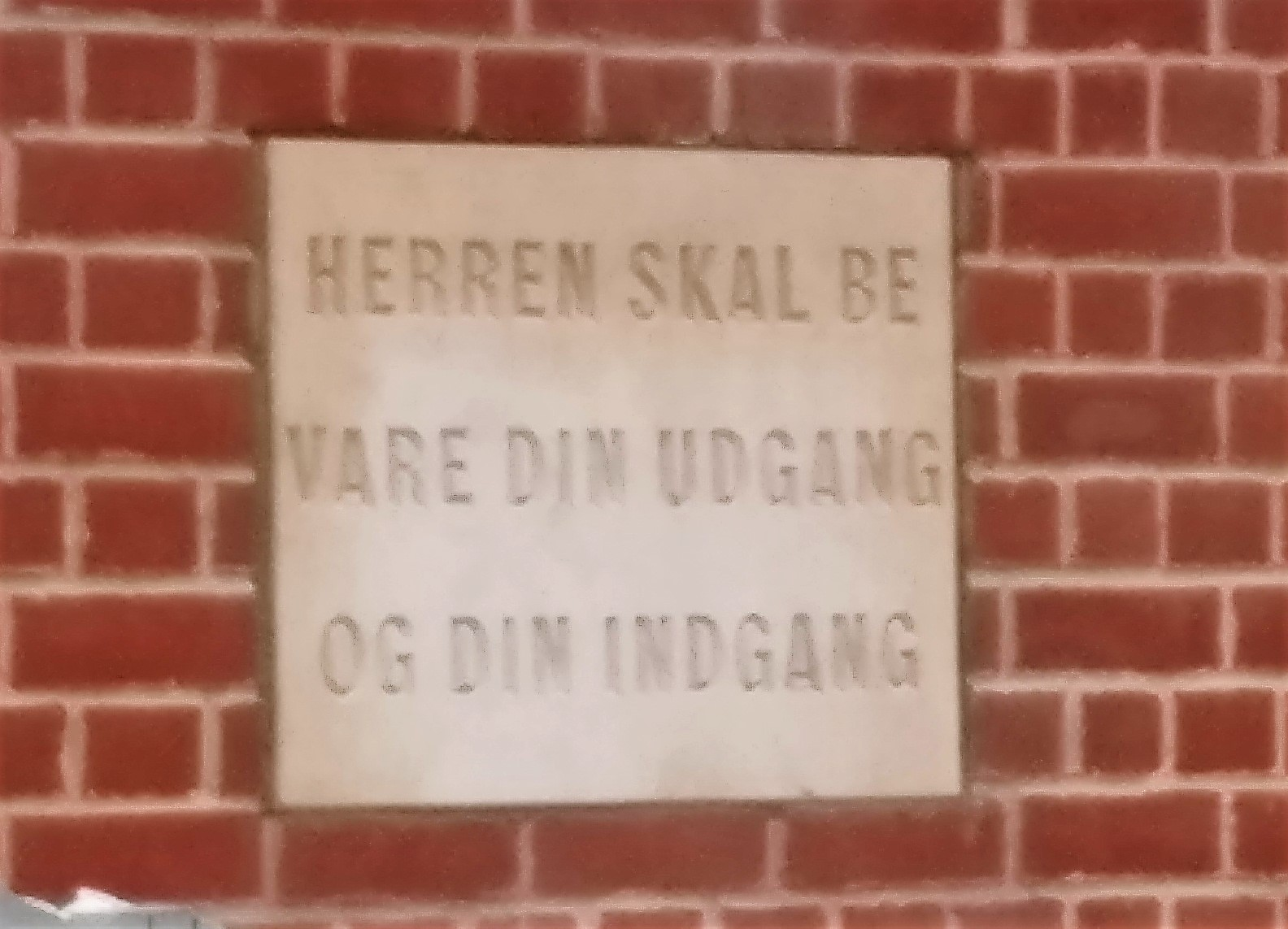
Danish inscription on Fort Green Mill

There is an inscription in Danish, formerly above one of the doors, now on a wall, "Herren skal bevare din udgang og din indgang". It means "The Lord shall preserve thy going out and thy coming in," from Psalm 121 verse 8.
