= Creeting St Mary Windmill =

Windmill in Creeting St Mary, Suffolk, England

Origin
- Mill name: Creeting St Mary Mill
- Grid reference: TM 091 553
- Coordinates: 52.15611°N 1.05778°E
- Operator(s): Private
- Year built: 1796

Information
- Purpose: Corn mill
- Type: Post mill
- No. of sails: Four Sails
- Type of sails: Patent Sails
- Year lost: c1860

Creeting St Mary Windmill is a Grade II listed dovecote at Creeting St Mary, Suffolk, England which has been restored. It was originally the body of a post mill which stood elsewhere in the village.

== History ==
Creeting St Mary windmill was built in 1796 at grid reference TM 095 558. The mill was dismantled c1860, and the body was moved to the grounds of the medieval hall known as Houghton Park Farm, now The Old Hall. The Mill was part of the complex of outbuildings, which later became Alder Carr Farm. The mill had Patent sails, which were transferred to a tower mill at Kersey when the mill was dismantled. It served for many years as a dovecote. It is the only such example of a reused windmill buck remaining in the country. The building was derelict by the late 1970s but was restored in 1995, and moved to a new position on the farm, converted to a craft workshop. The buck retains all its original framing.

== Description ==
Creeting St Mary Windmill was a post mill with four Patent sails.

== Public access ==
Alder Carr Farm is open every day 9:00 to 17:00 except Christmas Day, Boxing Day and New Year's Day. The mill building is currently home to Halfpenny Home Haberdashery and all areas are open to the public Tuesday to Saturday from 10:00 to 16:00 and after Easter also on Sundays from 10:00 to 16:00.
