= Buxhall Windmill =

Former tower mill at Buxhall, Suffolk, England

Buxhall Smock Mill
- Interactive map of Buxhall Smock Mill

Origin
- Mill name: Buxhall mill
- Grid reference: TL 996 577
- Coordinates: 52.1819°N 0.9189°E
- Operator: Clover family
- Year built: 1815

Information
- Purpose: Corn mill
- Type: Smock mill
- Base storeys: Three-storey base
- Smock sides: Eight-sided smock
- No. of sails: Four sails
- Year lost: Demolished 1860

Buxhall Tower Mill
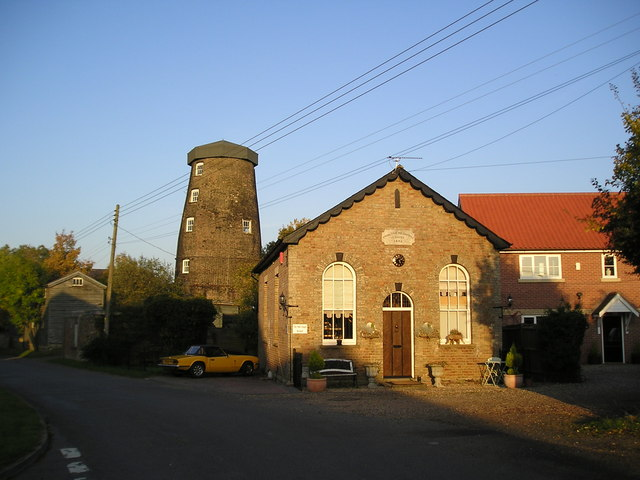
- The converted mill
- Interactive map of Buxhall Tower Mill

Origin
- Mill name: Buxhall Mill
- Grid reference: TL 996 577
- Operator: Private
- Year built: 1860

Information
- Purpose: Corn mill
- Type: Tower mill
- Storeys: Three storeys
- Base storeys: Three-storey base
- No. of sails: Four Sails
- Type of sails: Patent sails
- Windshaft: Cast iron
- Winding: Fantail
- Auxiliary power: Oil engine
- No. of pairs of millstones: Five pairs
- Other information: Built on base of previous smock mill

Buxhall Mill is a tower mill at Buxhall, Suffolk, England which has been converted to residential accommodation.

== History ==
There have been three windmills on this site. The first mill was a post mill. It was marked on Joseph Hodgkinson's map of 1783 and described as "newly erected" in a newspaper report of it burning down as the result of suspected arson on 9 July 1814.

The second mill was a smock mill. It was built by Samuel Wright, millwright of Needham Market. The account for building the mill reads as follows:

Item	£	s.	d.
To building a smock wind Mill as per agreement	520.	15.	11¾.
To extra Studd^{g} & partitions in wheat bin 88 feet 9 in. (Note: This means 88 feet 9 inches (27.05 m) linear measurement of timber.)	3.	8.	9.
To large meal hopper cont^{g} 48 feet (Note: This means a bin with a capacity of 48 cubic feet (1.4 m^{3}).)	2.	8.	0.
To a pair of pullie Blocks Iron^{d} up with Screw Eyes to do.	1.	11.	6.
Total	528.	3.	5¾. (Note: Actual total should be £539. 4. 2¾.)

Notes

In the 1850s, a steam mill was erected close to the smock mill. It was powered by a beam engine and drove two pairs of millstones. a third pair was added at a later date, along with other machines for cleaning grain and dressing flour. This proved to be too much for the beam engine with the result that the beam broke and the engine was wrecked. The mill was worked by the Clover family until 1860 when it was dismantled. The machinery, cap and sails from the smock mill were incorporated into the new tower mill. Work started on 8 May 1860 and was completed in February 1861.

Buxhall Mill was built by William Bear, the Sudbury millwright at a cost of £506 6s 9d. The lower three storeys formed the base of a smock mill which stood on the site previously. The mill was worked by wind until November 1929 when the sails were damaged in a storm. The swing-pot neck bearing was removed and sold to John Bryant of Pakenham mill. It was eventually installed in that mill in 1950 by Amos Clarke, the Ipswich millwright. In the 1940s Buxhall mill was stripped of its millstones and refitted as an engine driven mill, in which form it worked until 1971. The mill had lost its cap by 1971, with the cap frame remaining on the top of the tower.

== Description ==
=== Tower ===
The tower of Buxhall Mill is three storeys, built on a three-storey base of a smock mill. It is 17 feet 8 inches (5.38 m) diameter at curb level. There was a stage at second-floor level.

=== Cap, sails and fantail ===
Buxhall Mill had a domed cap with a gallery. It was 17 feet 6 inches (5.33 m) diameter and 14 feet (4.27 m) high internally. The four patent sails had eleven bays of three shutters, and spanned 80 feet (24.38 m). They were carried on stocks of 55 feet (16.76 m) long, 13 inches (330 mm) square at the poll end. The sails were 33 feet 6 inches (10.21 m) long and 8 feet 6 inches (2.59 m) long. They were fitted with Catchpole's Air Brakes. These provided extra power in light winds, but acted as an effective air brake in strong winds. The windshaft weighed 38 cwt (1,930 kg) and cost £38. 0. 0. new in 1860. The cap was winded by an eight bladed fantail. An unusual feature of this mill was the cast iron gutter around the curb, which collected rainwater from the cap and delivered it to the ground via a downpipe on the outside of the mill.

=== Machinery ===
The mill drove four pairs of millstones, a fifth pair being described as "of small size". The upright shaft was in two sections. It carried a 6 feet 2 inches (1.88 m) cast iron great spur wheel with 96 cogs. The spur wheel weighed 2 tons 13 cwt (2,693 kg) and cost £32. 0 .0 new in 1860.

== Millers ==
- Isaac Clover 1815–1844 (smock mill)
- Clover 1860– (tower mill)
- Clover
- J A Clover –1971

References for above:-
