= Blackshore Mill, Reydon =

Windmill in Suffolk, England

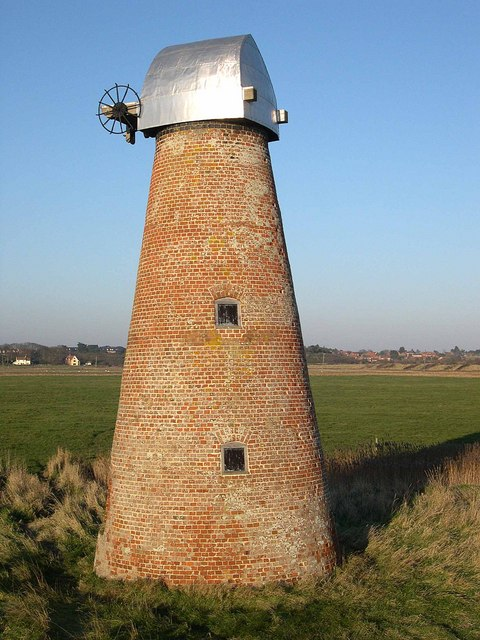
- The mill in 2006

Origin
- Mill location: TM 491 759
- Coordinates: 52°19′28″N 1°39′24″E
- Operator(s): Private
- Year built: c1890

Information
- Purpose: Windpump
- Type: Tower mill
- Storeys: Three storeys
- No. of sails: Four Sails
- Type of sails: Patent sails
- Windshaft: Cast iron
- Winding: Fantail
- Type of pump: Three throw plunger pump

Blackshore Mill or Blackshore Windpump is a Grade II listed water-pumping tower mill at Reydon, Suffolk, England which has been conserved.

== History ==
Blackshore Mill, constructed around 1890 by Robert Martin, the Beccles millwright, was built after he secured the contract for its construction by outbidding Simon Nunn of Wenhaston. The mill operated for approximately four years before it was damaged when the windshaft broke at the poll end, causing the sails to be blown off. It remained in disrepair for many years until restoration efforts began in 2002 to preserve the historic structure.

== Description ==
Blackshore Mill is a three-storey tower mill. It had a boat-shaped cap winded by a fantail. The four Patent sails were carried on a cast-iron windshaft. The tower is about 26 feet 3 inches (8.00 m) high and all machinery is of cast iron.
