= Stansfield Windmill =

Grade II listed windmill in the United kingdom

Stansfield Mill
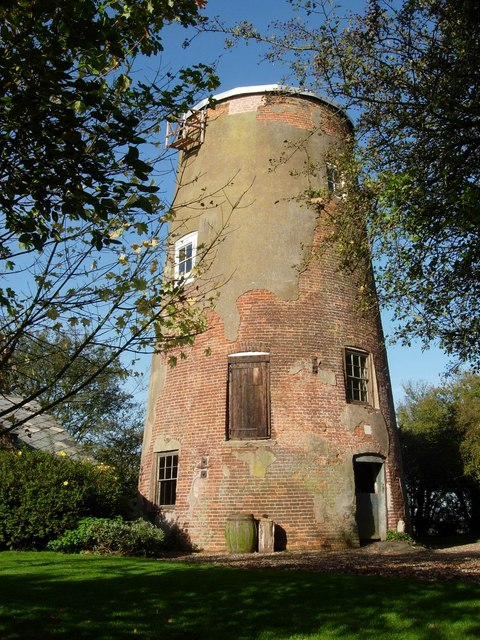
- The mill in 2006
- Interactive map of Stansfield Mill

Origin
- Mill location: TL 785 528
- Coordinates: 52°08′40″N 0°36′35″E
- Operator: Private
- Year built: 1840

Information
- Purpose: Corn mill
- Type: Tower mill
- Storeys: Five storeys
- No. of sails: Four Sails
- Type of sails: Patent sails
- Winding: Fantail
- No. of pairs of millstones: Two pairs

Stansfield Mill is a Grade II listed tower mill at Stansfield, Suffolk, England which is derelict.

== History ==
Stansfield Mill was built in 1840, replacing an earlier post mill. The millwright who built the mill is probably William Bear of Sudbury. It is not recorded when the mill ceased work, but the cap was removed in 1922 and the mill subsequently became derelict.

== Description ==
Stansfield Mill is a five-storey tower mill. It had a dome shaped cap winded by a fantail. There were four Patent sails. The machinery is of wood, including the clasp arm great spur wheel. The mill drove two pairs of millstones.
