= Blundeston Windmill =

Residential conversion of Blundeston Mill in Suffolk

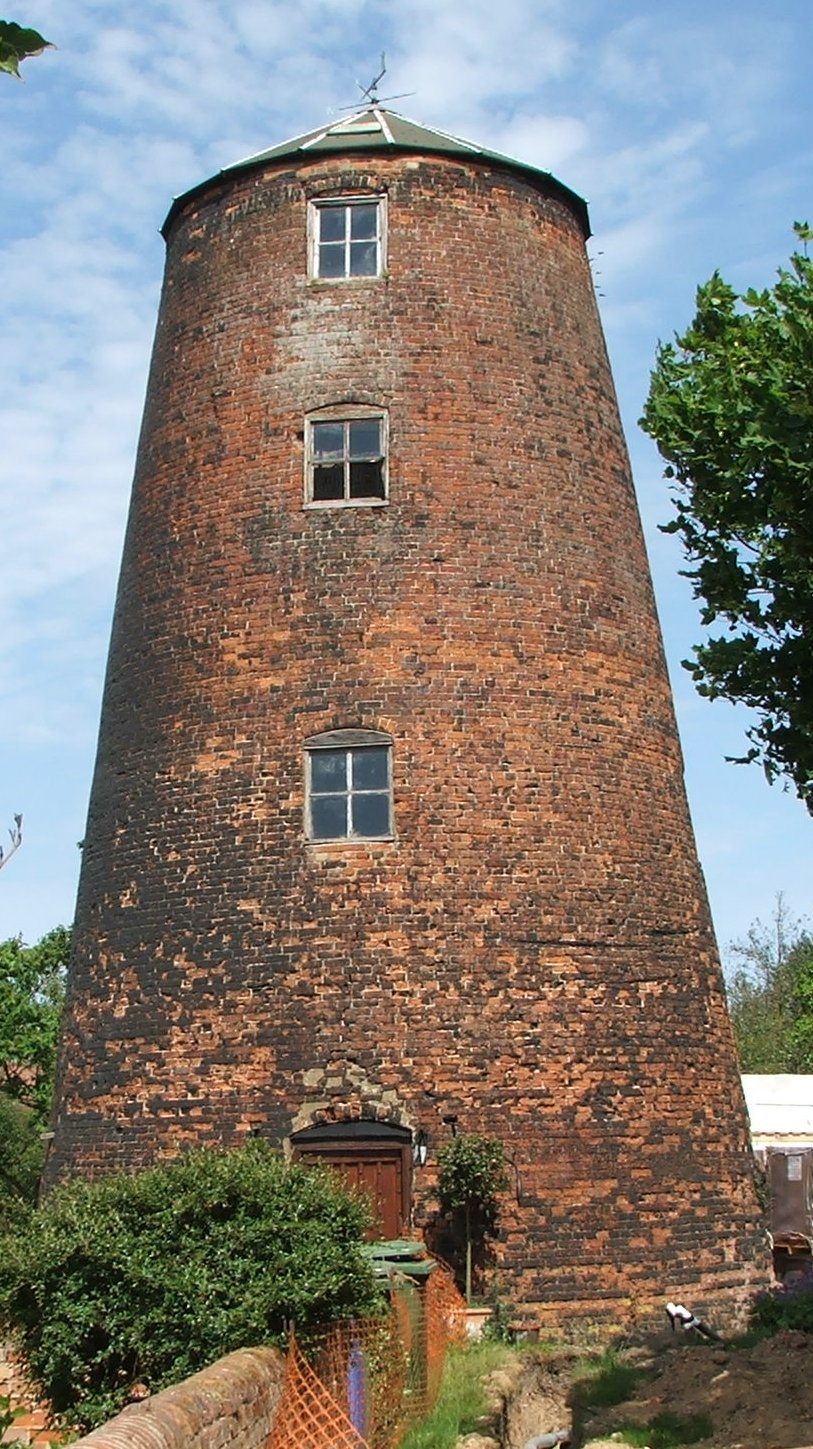
- The mill in June 2011

Origin
- Mill name: Blundeston Mill
- Grid reference: TM 5165 9747
- Coordinates: 52.51676°N 1.70734°E
- Operator(s): Private
- Year built: c1820

Information
- Purpose: Corn mill
- Type: Tower mill
- Storeys: Four storeys
- No. of sails: Four Sails
- Type of sails: Patent sails
- Winding: Fantail
- No. of pairs of millstones: Two pairs

Blundeston Mill is a tower mill at Blundeston, Suffolk, England which has been converted to residential accommodation.

== History ==
Blundeston Mill was built c1820 by Robert Martin, the Beccles millwright. The mill was worked until 1923 and dismantled in 1933 when it was converted to a house.

== Description ==
Blundeston Mill is a four-storey tower mill which had four Patent sails. The boat shaped cap was winded by a fantail. The mill drove two pairs of millstones
