= Lound Windmill =

Windmill in Suffolk, England

Lound Mill
- Lound Mill

Origin
- Mill location: TG 498 005
- Coordinates: 52°32′41″N 1°41′07″E
- Operator(s): Private
- Year built: 1837

Information
- Purpose: Corn mill
- Type: Tower mill
- Storeys: Four storeys
- No. of sails: Four Sails
- Type of sails: Patent sails
- Winding: Fantail
- No. of pairs of millstones: Three pairs

Lound Mill is a tower mill at Lound in the English county of Suffolk which has been converted to residential accommodation.

== History ==
Lound Mill was built in 1837 by Robert Martin, the Beccles millwright replacing an earlier post mill. The mill worked by wind until 1939. The machinery was removed c1961 when the mill was converted to residential accommodation.

== Description ==
Lound Mill is a four storey tower mill. It had a boat shaped cap with a gallery and was winded by a fantail. The four Patent sails drove three pairs of millstones.
