= Burgh Windmill =

Windmill in Burgh, Suffolk, England

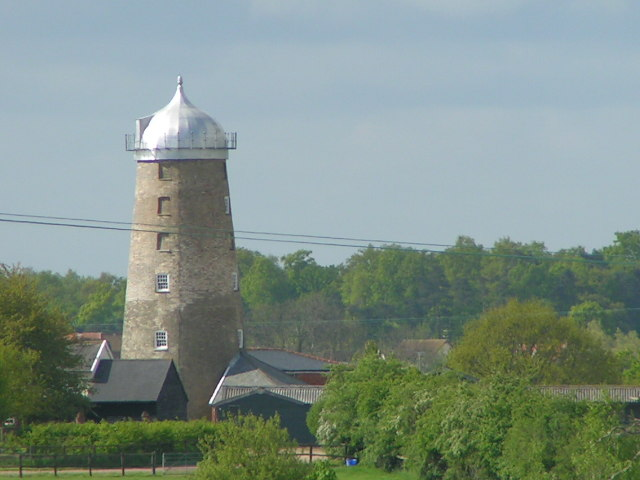
- The converted mill, May 2005

Origin
- Mill name: Burgh Mill
- Mill location: TM 230 514
- Coordinates: 52°06′57″N 1°15′29″E
- Operator(s): Private
- Year built: 1842

Information
- Purpose: Corn mill
- Type: Tower mill
- Storeys: Seven storeys
- No. of sails: Four Sails
- Type of sails: Patent sails
- Winding: Fantail
- Auxiliary power: Engine
- No. of pairs of millstones: Four pairs

Burgh Mill is a Grade II listed tower mill at Burgh, Suffolk, England. The mill was converted to a residential accommodation in 2005.

== History ==
Burgh Mill was built in 1842 by John Whitmore the Wickham Market millwright for Francis Buttrum. It replaced an earlier tower mill nearby. The mill was the tallest one built by Whitmore. In 1919, an 8 horsepower (6.0 kW) engine was installed. The mill worked by wind until 1922 and the machinery was dismantled in 1925 by millwright Amos Clarke. From July 1940 the mill became home to L.1 post of the Observer Corps after moving from their previous location. The high vantage point afforded by the mill enabled the Observers to plot and report the movement of aircraft in the area as part of a nationwide network of observation posts. Post L.1 operated as part of a "cluster" of three such posts L.2 being located at Woolverstone and L.3 at Felixstowe all reporting to 18 Group ROC in Colchester. The building was to remain occupied by the Royal Observer Corps until a new underground post was constructed immediately south west in 1960. The mill was derelict in 1997, but by 2005 it had gained a new galleried cap.

== Description ==
Burgh Mill is a seven-storey tower mill with an ogee cap which has a gallery. It had four Patent sails and was winded by a fantail. The tower is 23 feet (7.01 m) diameter internally at ground floor level and 13 feet (3.96 m) diameter internally at curb level. The height of the tower is 57 feet (17.37 m) to the curb. the four pairs of millstones were on the third floor. Recently renovated in 2004, it was reroofed and the brickwork replaced using the original Suffolk white bricks.

== Millers ==
- Francis Buttrum 1842-

References for above:-
