= Gazeley Windmill =

Windmill in Gazeley, Suffolk, England

Gazeley Mill
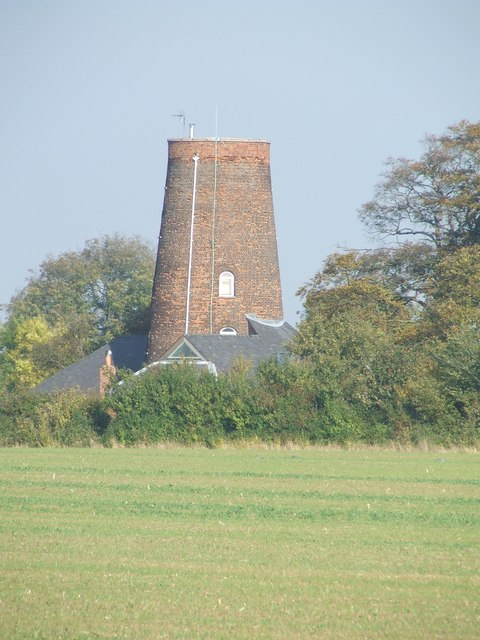
- The converted mill
- Interactive map of Gazeley Mill

Origin
- Mill name: Gazeley Mill
- Mill location: TL 717 649
- Coordinates: 52°15′19″N 0°30′59″E
- Operator: Private
- Year built: 1844

Information
- Purpose: Corn mill
- Type: Tower mill
- Storeys: Six storeys
- No. of sails: Four Sails
- Type of sails: Patent sails
- Winding: Fantail
- Fantail blades: Six blades
- Auxiliary power: Gippeswyck oil engine
- No. of pairs of millstones: five pairs

Gazeley Mill is a tower mill at Gazeley, Suffolk, England which has been converted to residential accommodation.

== History ==
Gazeley Mill was built in 1837 by William Death, replacing a nearby post mill. The mill drove five pairs of millstones. A Gippeswyck oil engine was installed by Turners, the Soham millwrights in 1880. In 1893, a one-and-a-half-sack roller mill made by Messrs E R & F Turner of Ipswich was installed. This was driven by the oil engine, which could also drive three of the five pairs of millstones. The mill ceased work c.1920 and was stripped of machinery and house converted in 1947.

== Description ==
Gazeley Mill is a six-storey tower mill. It had a boat shaped cap with a gallery, winded by a fantail. The four patent sails drove five pairs of millstones.

== Millers ==
- William De’ath 1844–1893
- R J Harvey 1893–1910
