= Crowfield Windmill =

Windmill in Crowfield, Suffolk, England

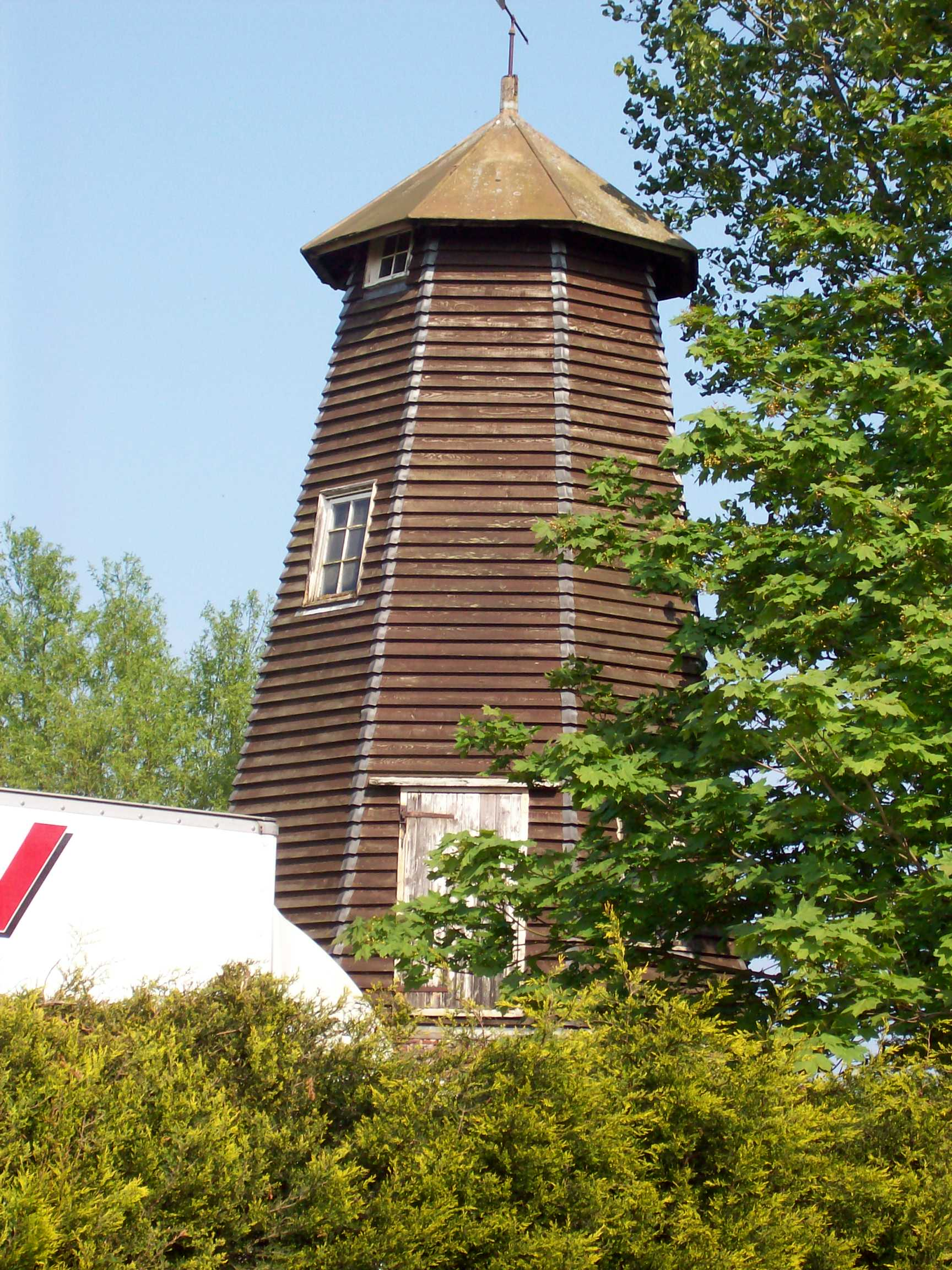
- Crowfield Mill, April 2007

Origin
- Mill name: Crowfield Mill
- Mill location: TM 151 571
- Coordinates: 52°10′12″N 1°08′47″E
- Operator(s): Private
- Year built: c1840

Information
- Purpose: Corn mill
- Type: Smock mill
- Storeys: Three-storey smock
- Base storeys: One storey
- Smock sides: Eight sides
- No. of sails: Four Sails
- Type of sails: Patent sails
- Winding: Fantail
- No. of pairs of millstones: Two pairs

Crowfield Windmill is a smock mill at Crowfield, Suffolk, England which has been conserved.

== History ==
Crowfield Windmill was originally built as a drainage mill near Great Yarmouth. It was moved to Crowfield c1840 and converted to a corn mill. The mill worked by wind until 1916 when the cap was blown off. An auxiliary engine was used to power the millstones until the mid-1930s.

== Description ==
Crowfield Windmill is a three-storey smock mill on a single-storey brick base. It had four patent sails and the boat-shaped cap was winded by a fantail. It has two pairs of underdrift millstones which are mounted on a hurst frame.

== Millers ==
- Gibbons - 1930s

Reference for above:-
