= Cockfield Windmill =

Tower mill in Suffolk, England

Cockfield Mill

Origin
- Mill name: Cockfield Mill
- Mill location: TL 904 539
- Coordinates: 52°09′01″N 0°47′02″E
- Operator(s): Private
- Year built: 1891

Information
- Purpose: Corn mill
- Type: Tower mill
- Storeys: Four storeys
- No. of sails: Four Sails
- Type of sails: Patent sails
- Winding: Fantail
- No. of pairs of millstones: Two pairs

Cockfield Mill is a tower mill at Cockfield, Suffolk, England, which has been converted to residential accommodation.

== History ==
Cockfield Mill was erected in 1891 by Brewer & Sillitoe, the Long Melford millwrights. It replaced Pepper Mill, an earlier tower mill on the site. It ceased work in 1900. The cap was removed c. 1918 and the mill was used for many years as a store. The empty tower has been converted to residential accommodation.

== Description ==
Cockfield Mill is a four storey tower mill. It had a domed cap winded by a fantail. The four Patent sails drove two pairs of millstones.
