= Westwood Marshes Mill, Walberswick =

Windmill in Walberswick, Suffolk, England

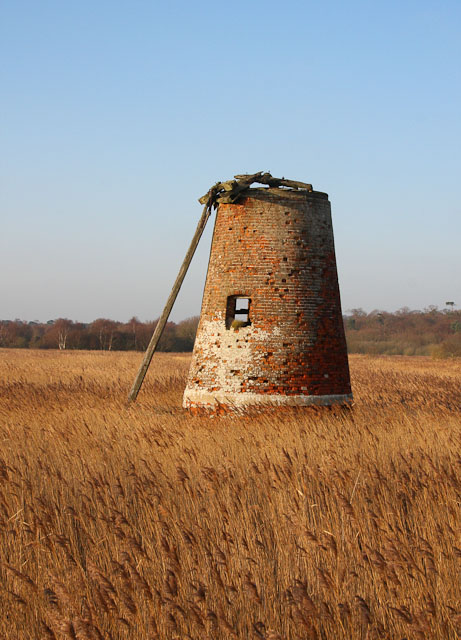
- The mill in 2008

Origin
- Mill location: TM 486 737
- Coordinates: 52°18′18″N 1°38′57″E
- Operator(s): Private
- Year built: Late 18th century

Information
- Purpose: Drainage mill, Corn mill
- Type: Tower mill
- Storeys: Three storeys
- No. of sails: Four Sails
- Type of sails: Common sails
- Windshaft: Cast Iron
- Winding: Tailpole
- No. of pairs of millstones: One pair
- Type of pump: Scoop wheel

Westwood Marshes Mill is a Grade II listed tower mill at Walberswick, Suffolk, England which is derelict.

== History ==
Westwood Marshes Mill was built in the late 18th century, possibly in 1798. It was worked by wind until 1940 and then damaged when used for target practice during World War II. The mill was repaired in the 1950s but in October 1960 it was burnt out in an arson attack. It remains standing in a derelict state.

== Description ==
Westwood Marshes Mill is a three-storey tower mill. It had a boat-shaped cap which was winded by a tailpole and winch, in a similar manner to the smock mill at Herringfleet. There were four common sails carried on a cast-iron windshaft. The wooden brake wheel drove a wooden wallower which was carried on the wooden upright shaft. This carries a cast-iron spur wheel which drives a cast-iron pit wheel with wooden cogs, carried on a wooden axle, as is the cast-iron scoop wheel with wooden paddles. Only the lower part of the upright shaft and the pit wheel and scoopwheel survived the fire. As well as the scoopwheel, the mill drove a pair of millstones which was used to grind feed for horses on the estate where the mill stood.

== Marshmen ==
- Jack Stannard - c. 1914
- Bob Westcott c. 1914 - 1940
