= Skoulding's Mill =

Windmill in Kelsale, Suffolk, England

Kelsale Mill
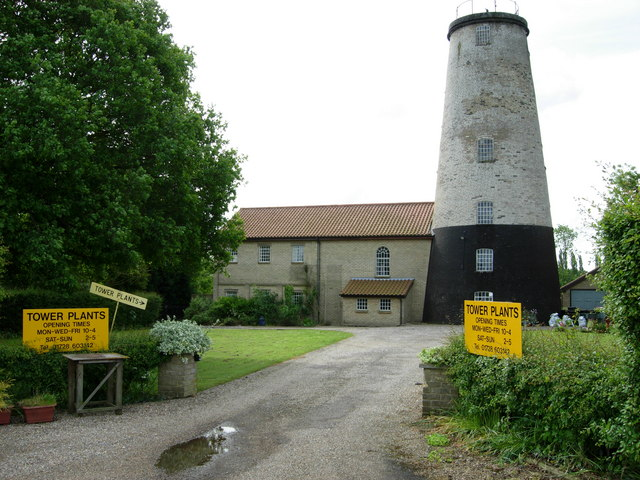
- The converted mill

Origin
- Mill name: Skoulding's Mill
- Mill location: TM 38133 64770
- Coordinates: 52°13′46.567″N 1°29′8.344″E
- Operator(s): Private
- Year built: 1856

Information
- Purpose: Corn mill
- Type: Tower mill
- Storeys: Seven storeys
- No. of sails: Four Sails
- Type of sails: Patent sails
- Winding: Fantail
- No. of pairs of millstones: Three pairs

Skoulding's Mill is a Grade II listed tower mill at Kelsale, Suffolk, England which has been converted to residential accommodation.

== History ==
Skoulding's Mill was built in 1856 by John Whitmore, the Wickham Market millwright. It was intended to replace a post mill in the same yard. It worked in conjunction with the post mill and a steam mill erected close by. The mill worked by wind until c1905 when it was refitted with roller milling equipment driven by a steam engine. The cap was removed in the early 1950s and the mill stripped of machinery at a later date. The empty mill tower was converted to residential accommodation.

== Description ==
Skoulding's Mill is a tall seven storey tower mill. The tower is 55 feet 2 inches (16.81 m) to the curb. It is 23 feet 2 inches (7.06 m) diameter at the base and 13 feet 11 inches (4.24 m) diameter at curb leve. The walls are 30 inches (760 mm) thick at ground level. The mill had an ogee cap with a gallery, winded by a fantail. The four double Patent sails drove three pairs of millstones. The lower two storeys of the mill were tarred, with the upper five painted white. The converted mill has a flat roof with a guard rail and a flagpole.

== Millers ==
- T & J Skoulding 1865 -

Reference for above:-
