= Drinkstone windmills =

Pair of windmills in Drinkstone, Suffolk, England

Drinkstone Post Mill
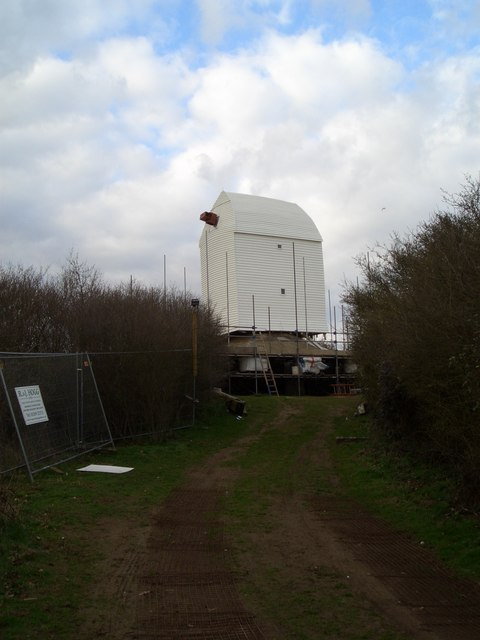
- Drinkstone post mill
- Interactive map of Drinkstone Post Mill

Origin
- Mill name: Clover's Mill
- Grid reference: TL 964 622
- Coordinates: 52.2234°N 0.8747°E
- Operator: Private
- Year built: 1689

Information
- Purpose: Corn mill
- Type: Post mill
- Roundhouse storeys: Single storey roundhouse
- No. of sails: Four sails
- Type of sails: Two Spring sails, two Common sails
- Windshaft: Wood, with cast iron poll end
- Winding: Fantail
- No. of pairs of millstones: Two pairs

Drinkstone Smock Mill
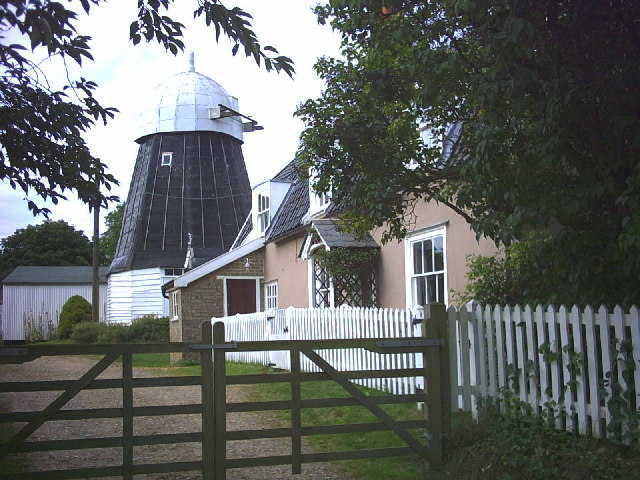
- Drinkstone smock mill
- Interactive map of Drinkstone Smock Mill

Origin
- Mill name: Clover's Mill
- Grid reference: TL 962 622
- Operator: Private
- Year built: 1780

Information
- Purpose: Corn mill
- Type: Smock mill
- Storeys: Two-storey smock
- Base storeys: single-storey base
- Smock sides: Eight sides
- No. of sails: Four sails
- Type of sails: Two Spring sails and two Common sails
- Windshaft: Wood
- Winding: Fantail
- Other information: Base formerly a horse mill

Drinkstone Windmills are a pair of windmills at Drinkstone, Suffolk, England. They consist a post mill and a smock mill. The post mill is Grade I listed and the smock mill is Grade II* listed. The mills were known as Clover's Mills as they were always worked by the Clover family.

== Post mill ==
Drinkstone Post Mill was built as an open trestle post mill. A brick and flint roundhouse was added in 1830. The mill was originally powered by Common sails. Spring sails were fitted during the nineteenth century and the mill was finally worked with one pair of spring and one pair of common sails. The mill has a wooden windshaft with a cast iron poll end, which was fitted by the millwright C Sillitoe of Long Melford. In the 1920s, an air brake was fitted to the sails, but the scheme was not successful and was abandoned Winding was by tailpole until the 1940s, when the fantail carriage from Barley Green Mill, Stradbroke was fitted. This was worked by a winch to start with and the fantail from Thurston Mill was fitted during World War Two. The fantail from Woolpit Mill was fitted in 1963.

The frame of the mill shows its age, there being no side girts. The body has been extended in the breast and tail, and the mill may have been reconstructed so that the original breast of the mill is now the tail. The mill has two pairs of millstones. The structure is currently on the Heritage at Risk Register.

=== Post mill history ===
Drinkstone Post Mill was built in 1689, making it the oldest windmill in Suffolk. Samuel Clover was given the post mill, horse mill and mill house by his father (Samuel Sr) in 1775. The mill passed to his son (Samuel Jr, b1752) and thence through a succession of Clovers to Wilfred, who took the mill on the death of his father Daniel in 1947. On 28 February 1949 the mill was tailwinded, damaging the sails and fantail. The mill became derelict until Mr Clover restored it in 1962 and put her back to work

== Smock mill ==
Drinkstone Smock Mill was built in 1780 on a horse mill which had been in existence in 1689. The mill is a two-storey smock mill on a single-storey base, which originally housed a horse mill. The mill has a pepperpot cap which was originally winded by a chain and wheel, a fantail being added towards the end of her working life. The mill was last worked with a pair of Common sails and a pair of Spring sails. The windshaft was a wooden one. The millstones were supported on a hurst frame, an arrangement usually found in a watermill.

== Millers ==
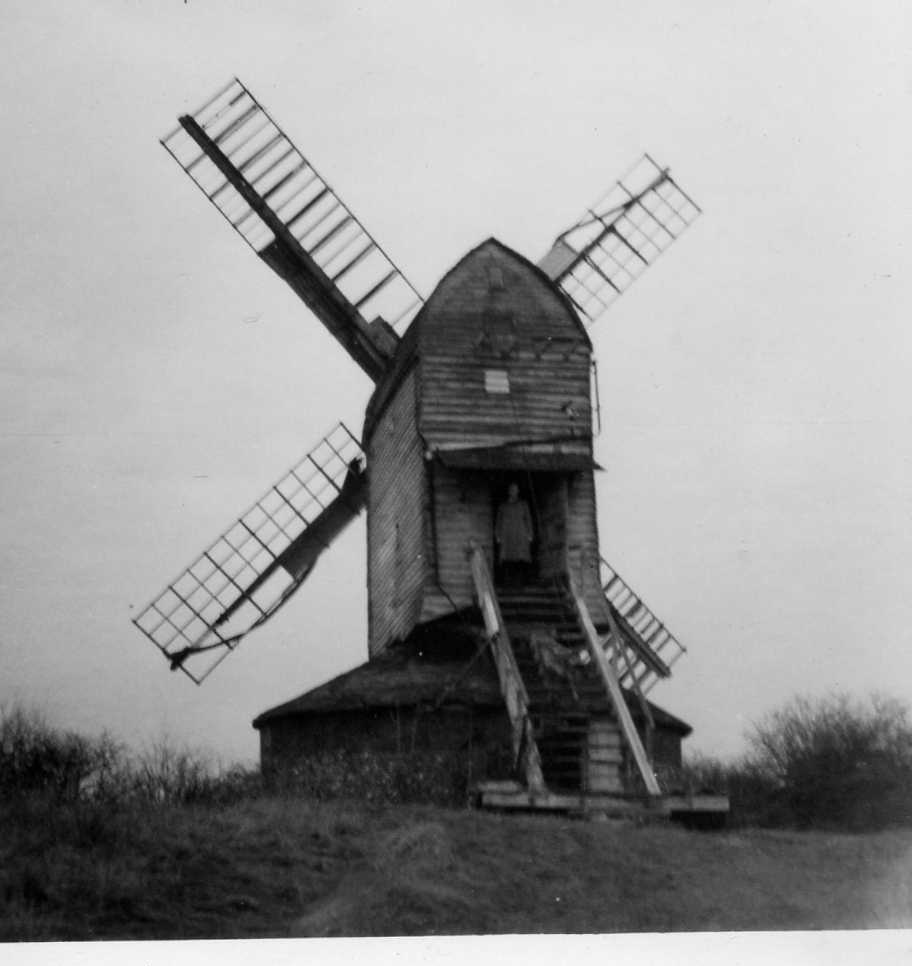
The post mill before the fantail was fitted

- Samuel Clover Sr – 1775
- Samuel Clover 1775 –
- Samuel Clover Jr
- John Clover
- Daniel Clover
- Mrs Clover – 1900
- Daniel Clover 1900 – 1947
- Wilfred Clover 1947 – 1949, 1962 –

Reference for above:-

== Culture and media ==
Drinkstone post mill was featured in the Dad's Army episode "Don't Forget the Diver" in which Lance Corporal Jones went round on the sails of the mill and was thrown off into a pond.
