= Chilton Street Mill, Clare =

Windmill in Clare, Suffolk, England

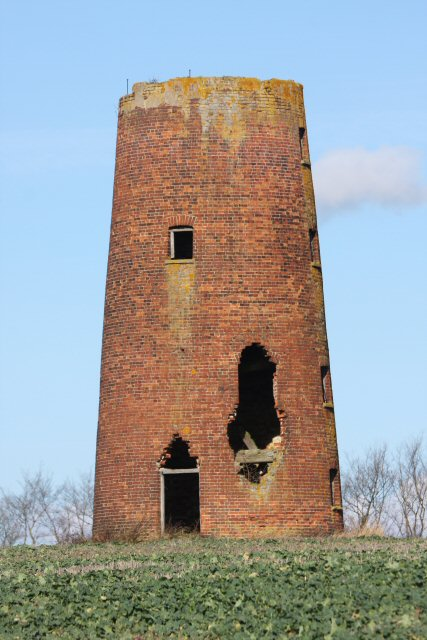
- Chilton Street Mill, February 2011

Origin
- Mill name: Chilton Street Mill
- Grid reference: TL 757 472
- Coordinates: 52.095°N 0.5658°E
- Operator(s): Private
- Year built: 1846

Information
- Purpose: Corn mill
- Type: Tower mill
- Storeys: Five storeys
- No. of sails: Four Sails
- Type of sails: Patent sails
- Winding: Fantail
- No. of pairs of millstones: Two pairs

Chilton Street Mill is a tower mill at Clare, Suffolk, England which is derelict.

== History ==
Chilton Street Mill was erected in 1846. It ceased work when the sails were blown off sometime before the First World War. The mill was stripped of machinery in the late 1920s or early 1930s and stands today as a shell.

== Description ==
Chilton Street Mill is a five-storey tower mill. It had a domed cap winded by a fantail. The four Patent sails drove two pairs of millstones.
