= Tutelina Mill, Great Welnetham =

Windmill in Great Whelnetham, Suffolk, England

Great Welnetham Mill
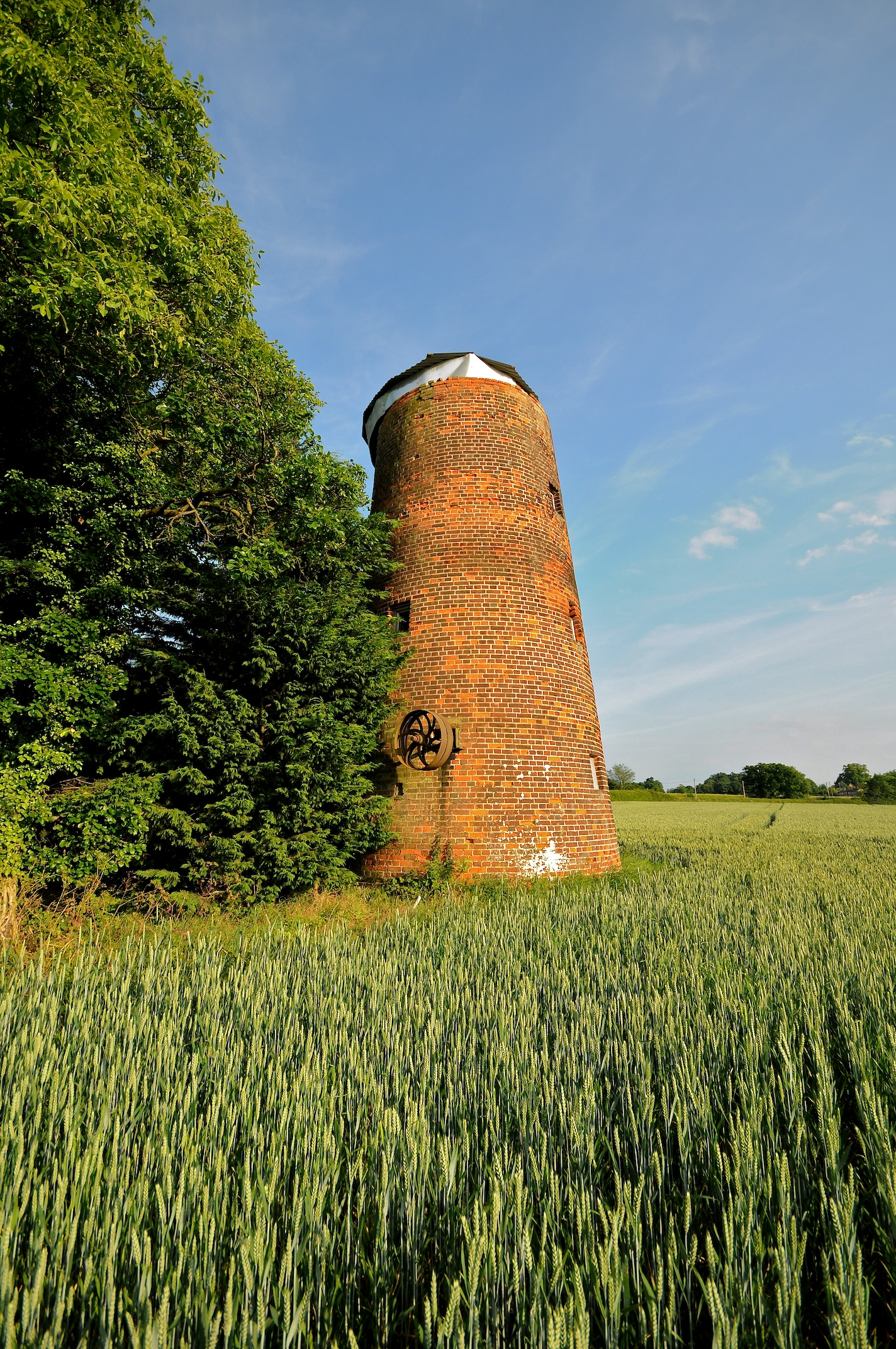
- Tutelina Mill

Origin
- Mill name: Tutelina Mill
- Mill location: TL 878 598
- Coordinates: 52°12′15″N 0°44′57″E
- Operator(s): Private
- Year built: 1865

Information
- Purpose: Corn mill
- Type: Tower mill
- Storeys: Four storeys
- No. of sails: Four Sails
- Type of sails: Patent sails
- Winding: Fantail
- Auxiliary power: Crossley oil engine
- No. of pairs of millstones: Two pairs

Tutelina Mill, also known as Clarke's Mill, is a Grade II listed tower mill at Great Welnetham, Suffolk, England which has been conserved.

== History ==
Tutelina Mill was built in 1865 and shares its name with a Roman harvest goddess (now usually known as Tutilina). A steam mill was erected nearby. The windmill worked by wind until 1910. The sails were removed in 1916, and the mill was worked by a Crossley engine until the mid-1960s.

== Description ==
Tutelina Mill is a small four storey tower mill. The tower is 28 feet 6 inches (8.69 m) to the curb. It had a domed cap, winded by a fantail. The four Patent sails drove two pairs of millstones. The wallower is cast iron with wooden teeth, carried on a cast iron upright shaft. The great spur wheel is also cast iron with wooden teeth.
