= Flixton Road Mill, Bungay =

Windmill in Bungay, Suffolk, England

The Tower Mill, Bungay
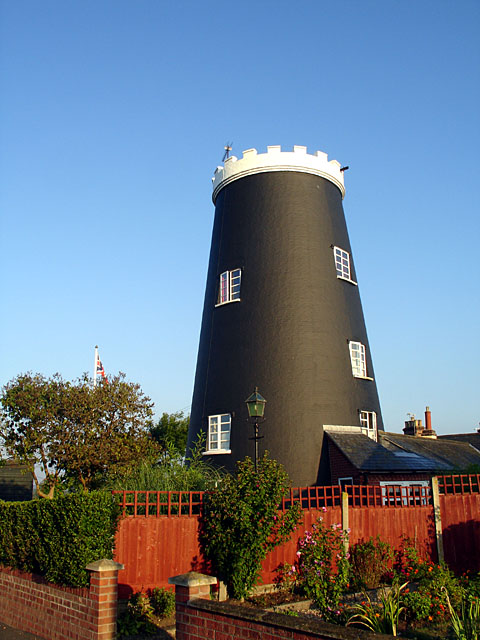
- The converted mill, August 2006

Origin
- Mill name: Flixton Road Mill
- Mill location: TM 339 890
- Coordinates: 52°26′55″N 1°26′35″E
- Operator(s): Private
- Year built: 1830

Information
- Purpose: Corn mill
- Type: Tower mill
- Storeys: Six storeys
- No. of sails: Four Sails
- Type of sails: Patent sails
- Winding: Fantail
- Auxiliary power: Engine
- No. of pairs of millstones: Three pairs
- Year lost: 1920s

Flixton Road Mill is a tower mill at Bungay, Suffolk, England which has been truncated and converted to residential accommodation. The structure is a Grade II listed building.

== History ==
Flixton Road Mill was built in 1830. It worked by wind until 1918 when it was struck by lightning. Later, it was truncated by one storey and converted to residential accommodation.

== Description ==
Flixton Road Mill was a six-storey tower mill with a boat shaped cap. It had four Patent sails of ten bays and was winded by a fantail. There was a stage at second floor level and the mill drove three pairs of millstones. Auxiliary power was by an engine, with the external drive belt enclosed in a wooden casing.

== Millers ==
- Frederick Robert Burtsal 1868–74

Reference for above:-
