= Barnham Windmill, Suffolk =

Windmill in Barnham, Suffolk, England

Barnham Windmill

Origin
- Mill name: Barnham Mill
- Mill location: TL 867 791
- Coordinates: 52°22′39.6″N 0°44′31.5″E
- Operator(s): Private
- Year built: 1821

Information
- Purpose: Corn mill
- Type: Tower mill
- Storeys: Three storeys
- No. of sails: Four Sails
- Type of sails: Patent sails
- Windshaft: Cast iron
- Winding: Fantail
- No. of pairs of millstones: Three pairs

Barnham Mill is a tower mill at Barnham, Suffolk, England, which has been converted to residential accommodation.

== History ==
Barnham Mill was built for the Duke of Grafton in 1821. It is likely that the builder was George Bloomfield of Thelnetham. The mill was worked until 1923. By the Second World War it was derelict, with the cap reduced to the frame and the fantail missing. The mill was stripped of machinery in 1967. It was subsequently incorporated into a house built alongside.

== Description ==
Barnham Mill is a three-storey tower mill which had four patent sails carried on a two-piece cast-iron windshaft. It had a domed cap which was winded by a fantail. It had three pairs of millstones.
