= Bacton Green, Suffolk =

Hamlet in Suffolk, England

Coordinates: 52.251°N 0.984°E

Bacton Green
- Location within Suffolk
- OS grid reference: TM0365
- Shire county: Suffolk
- Region: East
- Country: England
- Sovereign state: United Kingdom
- Police: Suffolk
- Fire: Suffolk
- Ambulance: East of England

Bacton Green is a hamlet in Suffolk, England.
