= Upper Mill, Walton =

Windmill in Walton, Suffolk, England

Walton Windmill

Origin
- Mill name: Upper Mill; Walton Mill
- Mill location: TM 290 359
- Coordinates: 51°58′27″N 1°20′07″E
- Operator(s): Private
- Year built: 1804

Information
- Purpose: Corn mill
- Type: Smock mill
- Storeys: Two-storey smock
- Base storeys: Two storeys
- Smock sides: Eight sides
- No. of sails: Four Sails
- Type of sails: Patent sails
- Winding: Fantail
- No. of pairs of millstones: Two pairs

Upper Mill or Walton Mill is a Grade II listed smock mill at Walton, Suffolk, England, which has been conserved.

== History ==
Upper Mill was built in 1804. The mill was dismantled in the early 20th century leaving the empty smock tower standing. The mill was on the Buildings at Risk Register in 1995 but repairs have since been carried out to the weatherboarding to ensure the mill's survival.

== Description ==
Upper Mill is a two-storey smock mill on a two-storey brick base. It had four Patent sails and the boat-shaped cap was winded by a fantail. It had two pairs of millstones.
