= Woodbridge Windmill =

Woodbridge Windmill may refer to a number of windmills.

There were eight windmills in Woodbridge, Suffolk. Three of which survive, although not all are on their original sites.

- Buttrum's Mill, Burkitt Road.
- Tricker's Mill, Theatre Street.
- A post mill on Mill Hill was moved to Ramsey, Essex in 1842 and still stands there.
