= Watermill =

Structure that uses a water wheel or turbine

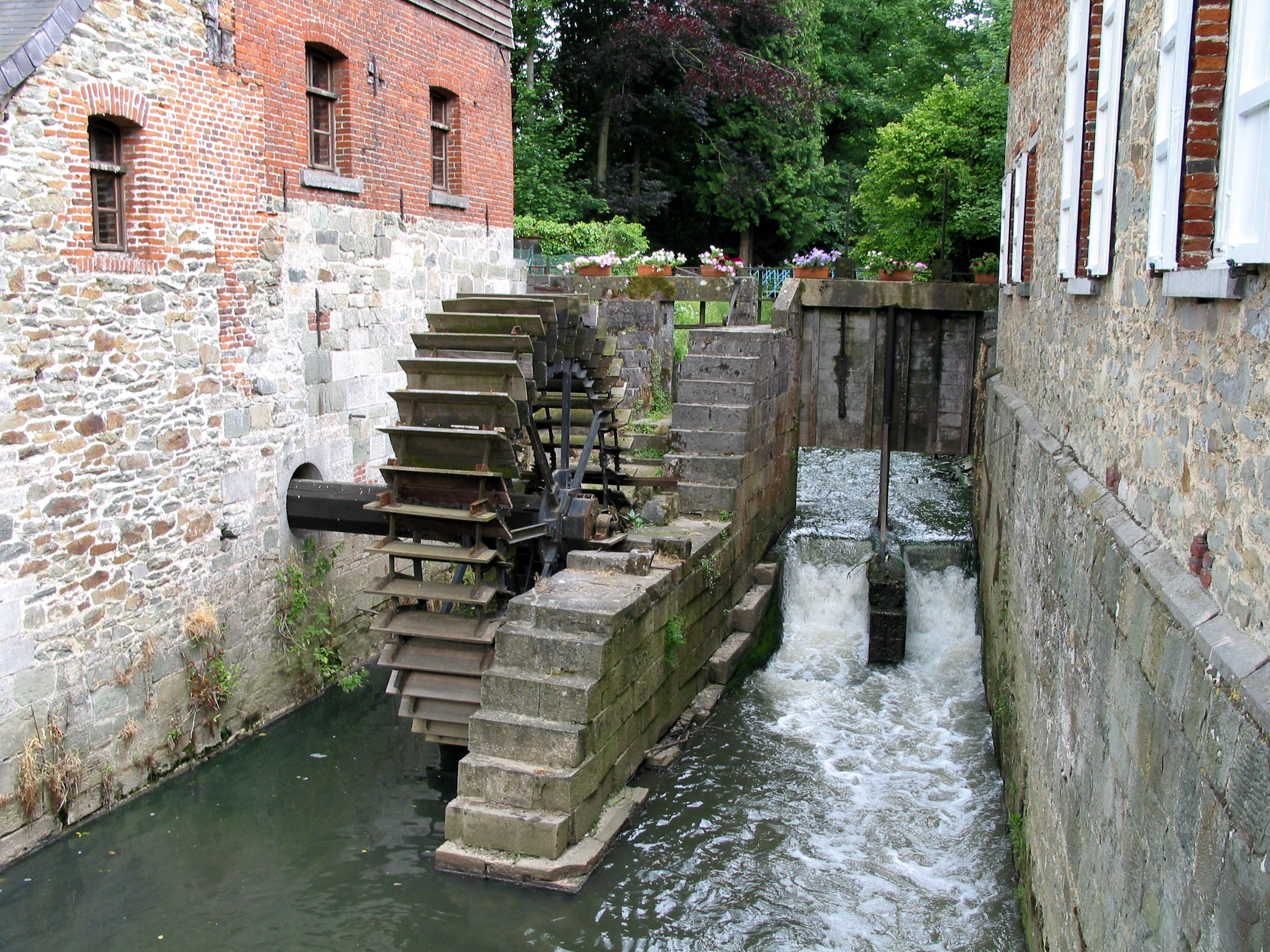
Watermill of Braine-le-Château, Belgium (12th century)

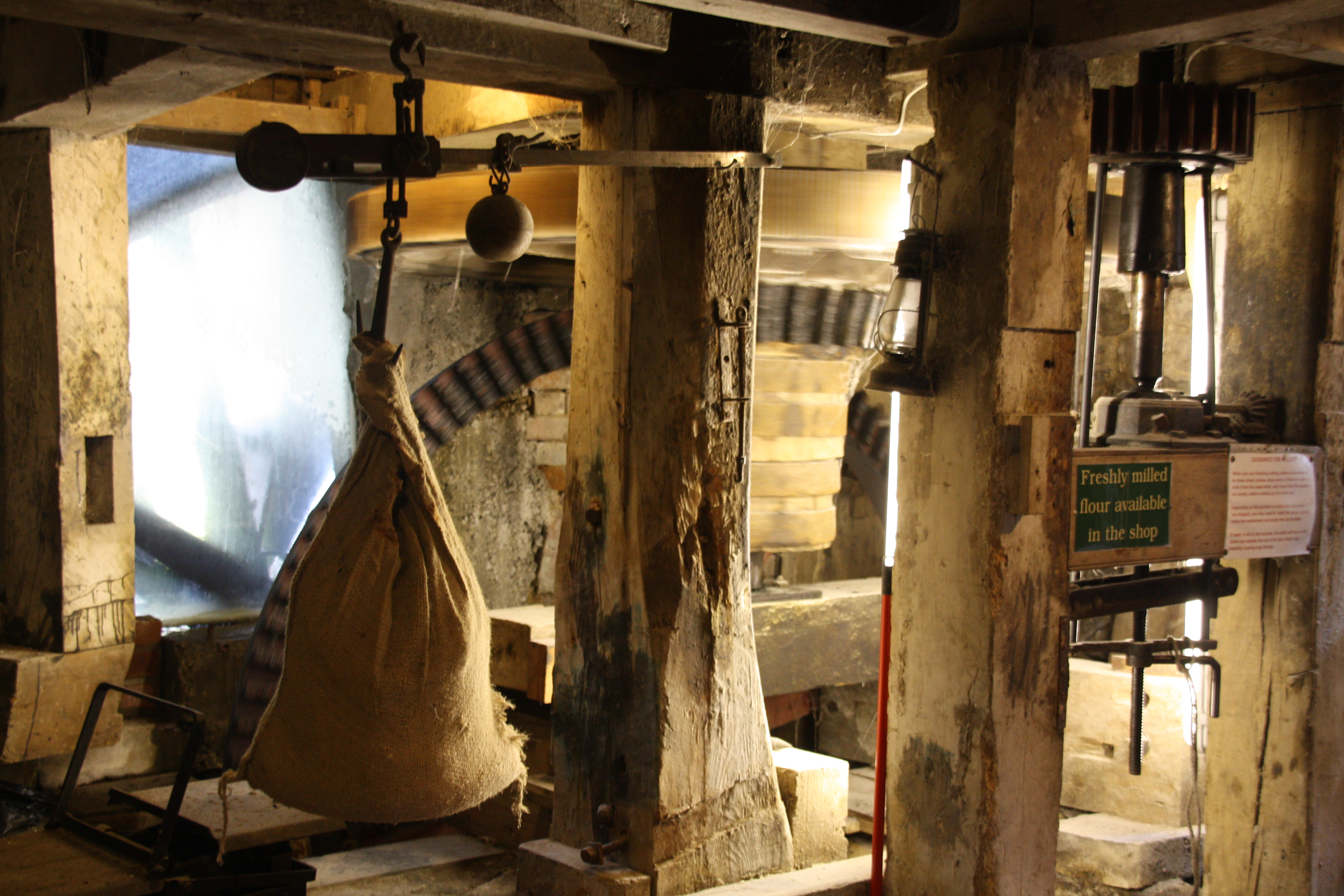
Interior of the Lyme Regis watermill, UK (14th century)

A watermill or water mill is a mill that uses hydropower. It is a structure that uses a water wheel or water turbine to drive a mechanical process such as milling (grinding), rolling, or hammering. Such processes are needed in the production of many material goods, including flour, lumber, paper, textiles, and many metal products. These watermills may comprise gristmills, sawmills, paper mills, textile mills, hammermills, trip hammering mills, rolling mills, and wire drawing mills.

One major way to classify watermills is by wheel orientation (vertical or horizontal), one powered by a vertical waterwheel through a gear mechanism, and the other equipped with a horizontal waterwheel without such a mechanism. The former type can be further subdivided, depending on where the water hits the wheel paddles, into undershot, overshot, breastshot and pitchback (backshot or reverse shot) waterwheel mills. Another way to classify water mills is by an essential trait about their location: tide mills use the movement of the tide; ship mills are water mills onboard (and constituting) a ship.

Watermills impact the river dynamics of the watercourses where they are installed. During the time watermills operate channels tend to sedimentate, particularly backwater. Also in the backwater area, inundation events and sedimentation of adjacent floodplains increase. Over time however these effects are cancelled by river banks becoming higher. Where mills have been removed, river incision increases and channels deepen.

== History ==
There are two basic types of watermills, one powered by a vertical-waterwheel via a gear mechanism, and the other equipped with a horizontal-waterwheel without such a mechanism. The former type can be further divided, depending on where the water hits the wheel paddles, into undershot, overshot, breastshot and reverse shot waterwheel mills.

=== Western world ===
==== Classical antiquity ====
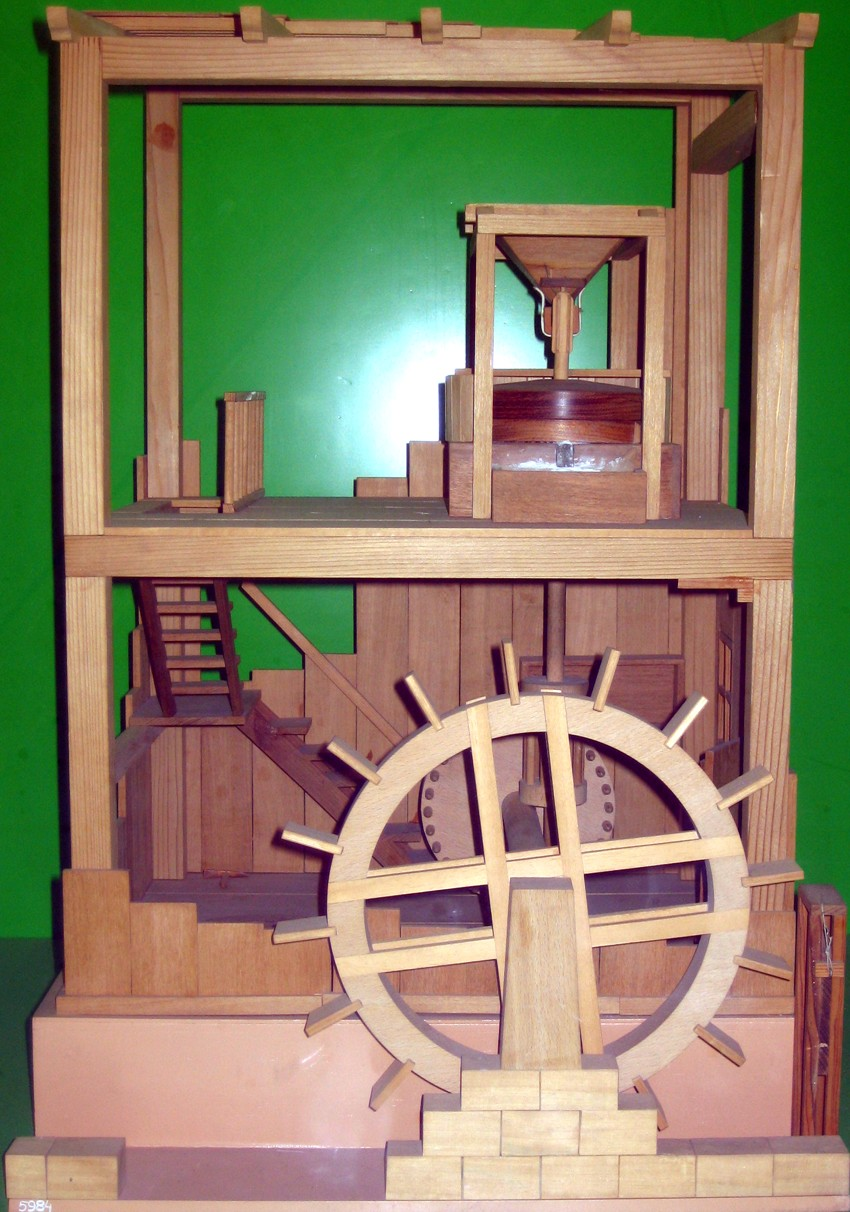
Model of a Roman water-powered grain mill described by Vitruvius. The millstone (upper floor) is powered by an undershot waterwheel by the way of a gear mechanism (lower floor)

The Greeks invented the two main components of watermills, the waterwheel and toothed gearing, and used, along with the Romans, undershot, overshot and breastshot waterwheel mills.

The earliest evidence of a water-driven wheel appears in the technical treatises Pneumatica and Parasceuastica of the Greek engineer Philo of Byzantium (ca. 280−220 BC). The British historian of technology M.J.T. Lewis has shown that those portions of Philo of Byzantium's mechanical treatise which describe water wheels and which have been previously regarded as later Arabic interpolations, actually date back to the Greek 3rd century BC original. The sakia gear is, already fully developed, for the first time attested in a 2nd-century BC Hellenistic wall painting in Ptolemaic Egypt.

Lewis assigns the date of the invention of the horizontal-wheeled mill to the Greek colony of Byzantium in the first half of the 3rd century BC, and that of the vertical-wheeled mill to Ptolemaic Alexandria around 240 BC.

The Greek geographer Strabo reports in his Geography a water-powered grain-mill to have existed near the palace of King Mithradates VI Eupator at Cabira, Asia Minor, before 71 BC.

The Roman engineer Vitruvius has the first technical description of a watermill, dated to 40/10 BC; the device is fitted with an undershot wheel and power is transmitted via a gearing mechanism. He also seems to indicate the existence of water-powered kneading machines.

The Greek epigrammatist Antipater of Thessalonica tells of an advanced overshot wheel mill around 20 BC/10 AD. He praised for its use in grinding grain and the reduction of human labour:

Hold back your hand from the mill, you grinding girls; even if the cockcrow heralds the dawn, sleep on. For Demeter has imposed the labours of your hands on the nymphs, who leaping down upon the topmost part of the wheel, rotate its axle; with encircling cogs, it turns the hollow weight of the Nisyrian millstones. If we learn to feast toil-free on the fruits of the earth, we taste again the golden age.

The Roman encyclopedist Pliny mentions in his Naturalis Historia of around 70 AD water-powered trip hammers operating in the greater part of Italy. There is evidence of a fulling mill in 73/74 AD in Antioch, Roman Syria.

The 2nd century AD multiple mill complex of Barbegal in southern France has been described as "the greatest known concentration of mechanical power in the ancient world". It featured 16 overshot waterwheels to power an equal number of flour mills. The capacity of the mills has been estimated at 4.5 tons of flour per day, sufficient to supply enough bread for the 12,500 inhabitants occupying the town of Arelate at that time. A similar mill complex existed on the Janiculum hill, whose supply of flour for Rome's population was judged by emperor Aurelian important enough to be included in the Aurelian Walls in the late 3rd century.

A breastshot wheel mill dating to the late 2nd century AD was excavated at Les Martres-de-Veyre, France.

Scheme of the Roman Hierapolis sawmill, the earliest known machine to incorporate the mechanism of a crank and connecting rod

The 3rd century AD Hierapolis water-powered stone sawmill is the earliest known machine to incorporate the mechanism of a crank and connecting rod. Further sawmills, also powered by crank and connecting rod mechanisms, are archaeologically attested for the 6th century AD water-powered stone sawmills at Gerasa and Ephesus. Literary references to water-powered marble saws in what is now Germany can be found in Ausonius 4th century AD poem Mosella. They also seem to be indicated about the same time by the Christian saint Gregory of Nyssa from Anatolia, demonstrating a diversified use of water-power in many parts of the Roman Empire.

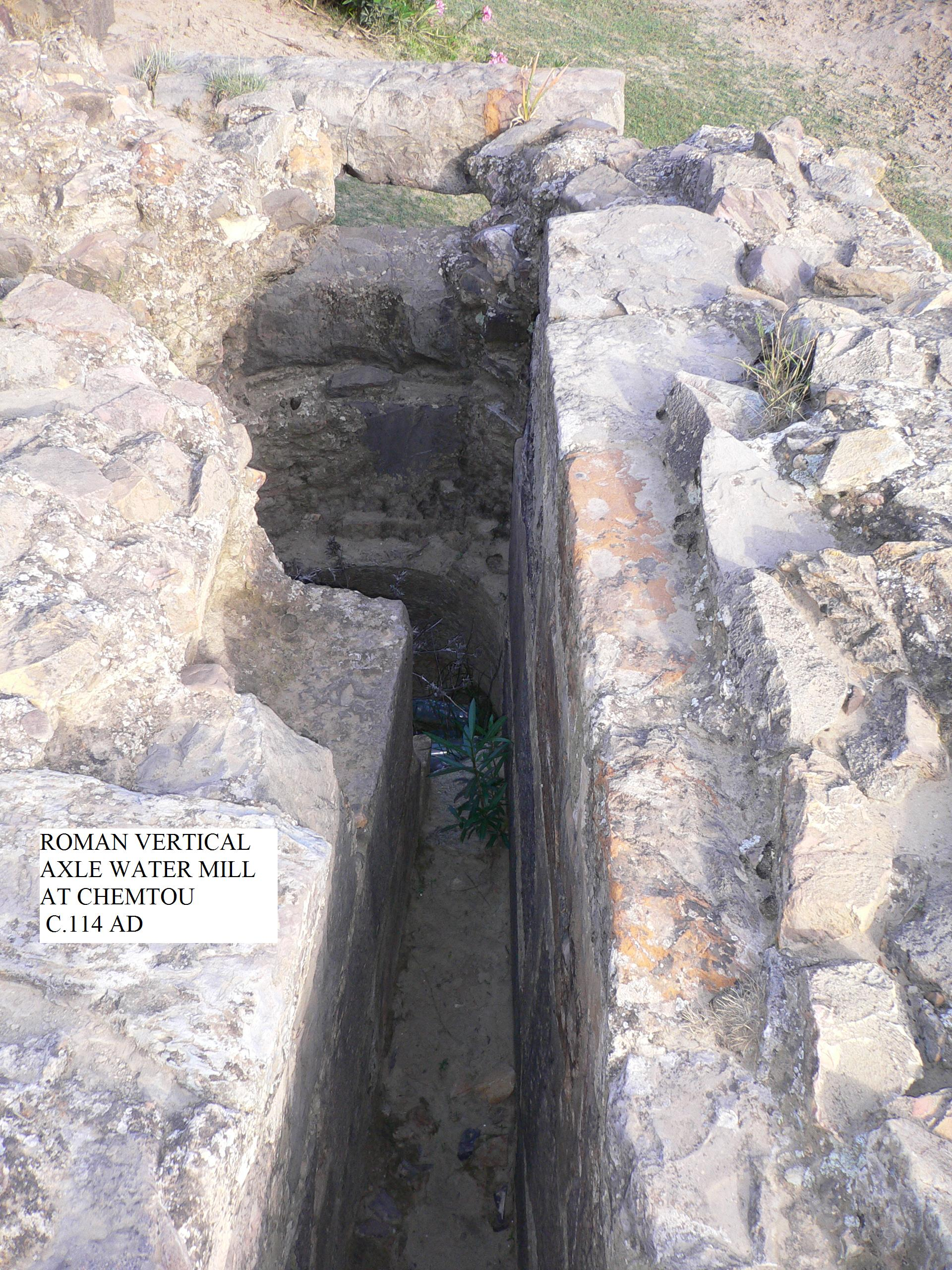
Roman turbine mill at Chemtou, Tunisia. The tangential water inflow of the millrace made the horizontal wheel in the shaft turn like a true turbine, the earliest known.

The earliest turbine mill was found in Chemtou and Testour, Roman North Africa, dating to the late 3rd or early 4th century AD. A possible water-powered furnace has been identified at Marseille, France.

Mills were commonly used for grinding grain into flour (attested by Pliny the Elder), but industrial uses as fulling and sawing marble were also applied.

The Romans used both fixed and floating water wheels and introduced water power to other provinces of the Roman Empire. So-called 'Greek Mills' used water wheels with a horizontal wheel (and vertical shaft). A "Roman Mill" features a vertical wheel (on a horizontal shaft). Greek style mills are the older and simpler of the two designs, but only operate well with high water velocities and with small diameter millstones. Roman style mills are more complicated as they require gears to transmit the power from a shaft with a horizontal axis to one with a vertical axis.

Although to date only a few dozen Roman mills are archaeologically traced, the widespread use of aqueducts in the period suggests that many remain to be discovered. Recent excavations in Roman London, for example, have uncovered what appears to be a tide mill together with a possible sequence of mills worked by an aqueduct running along the side of the River Fleet.

In 537 AD, ship mills were ingeniously used by the East Roman general Belisarius, when the besieging Goths cut off the water supply for those mills. These floating mills had a wheel that was attached to a boat moored in a fast flowing river.

Undershot water wheel, applied for watermilling since the 1st century BC

Overshot water wheel, applied for watermilling since the 1st century BC

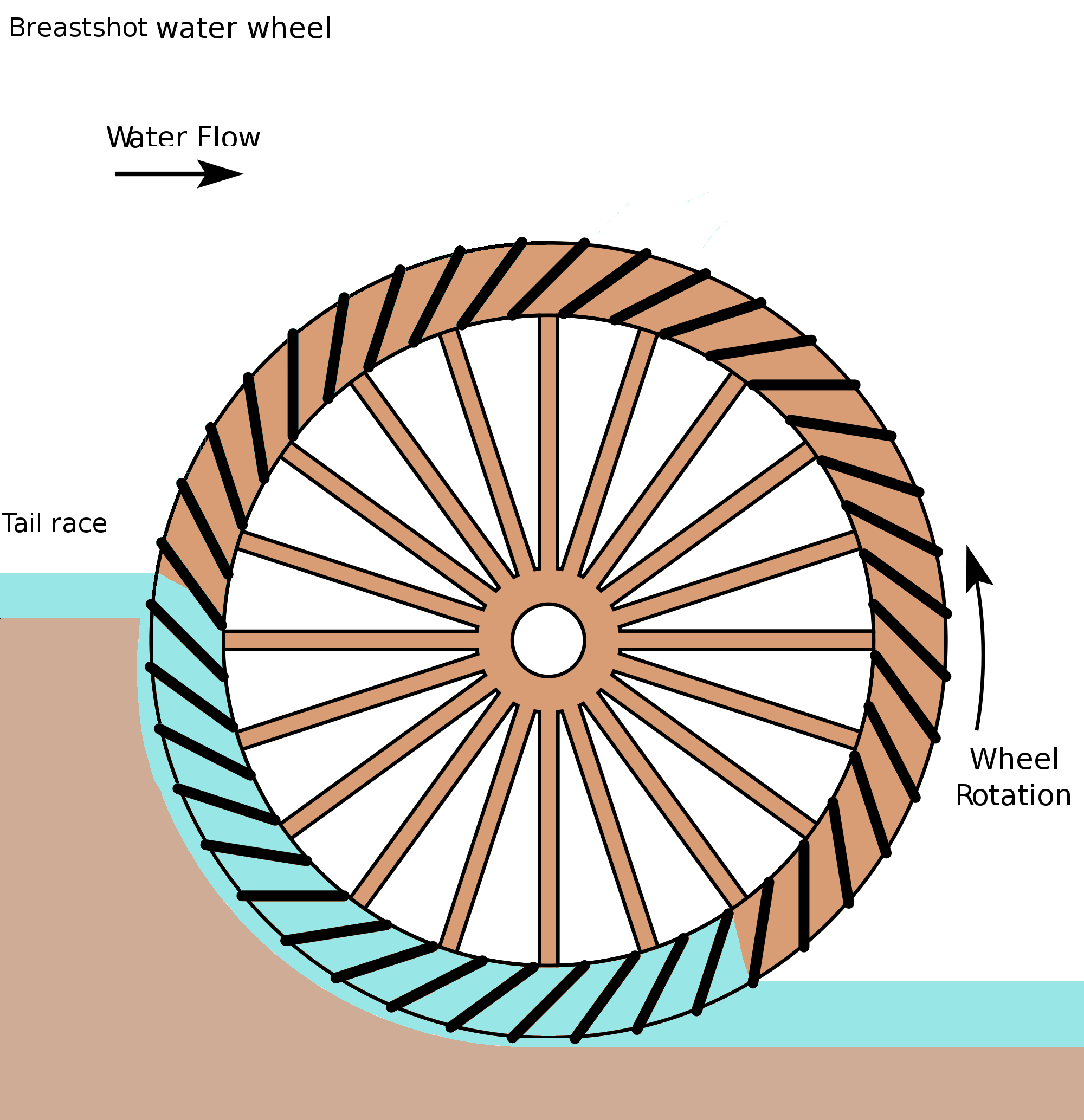
Breastshot water wheel, applied for watermilling since the 3rd century AD

==== Middle Ages ====
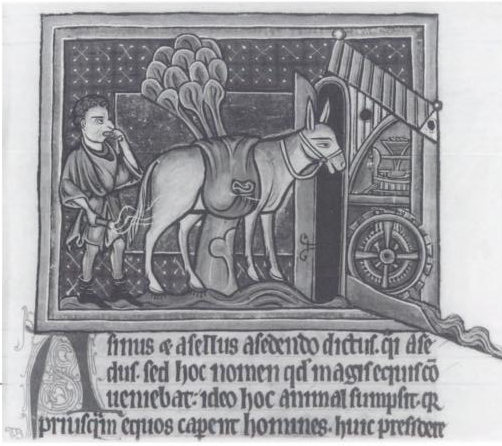
Medieval watermill

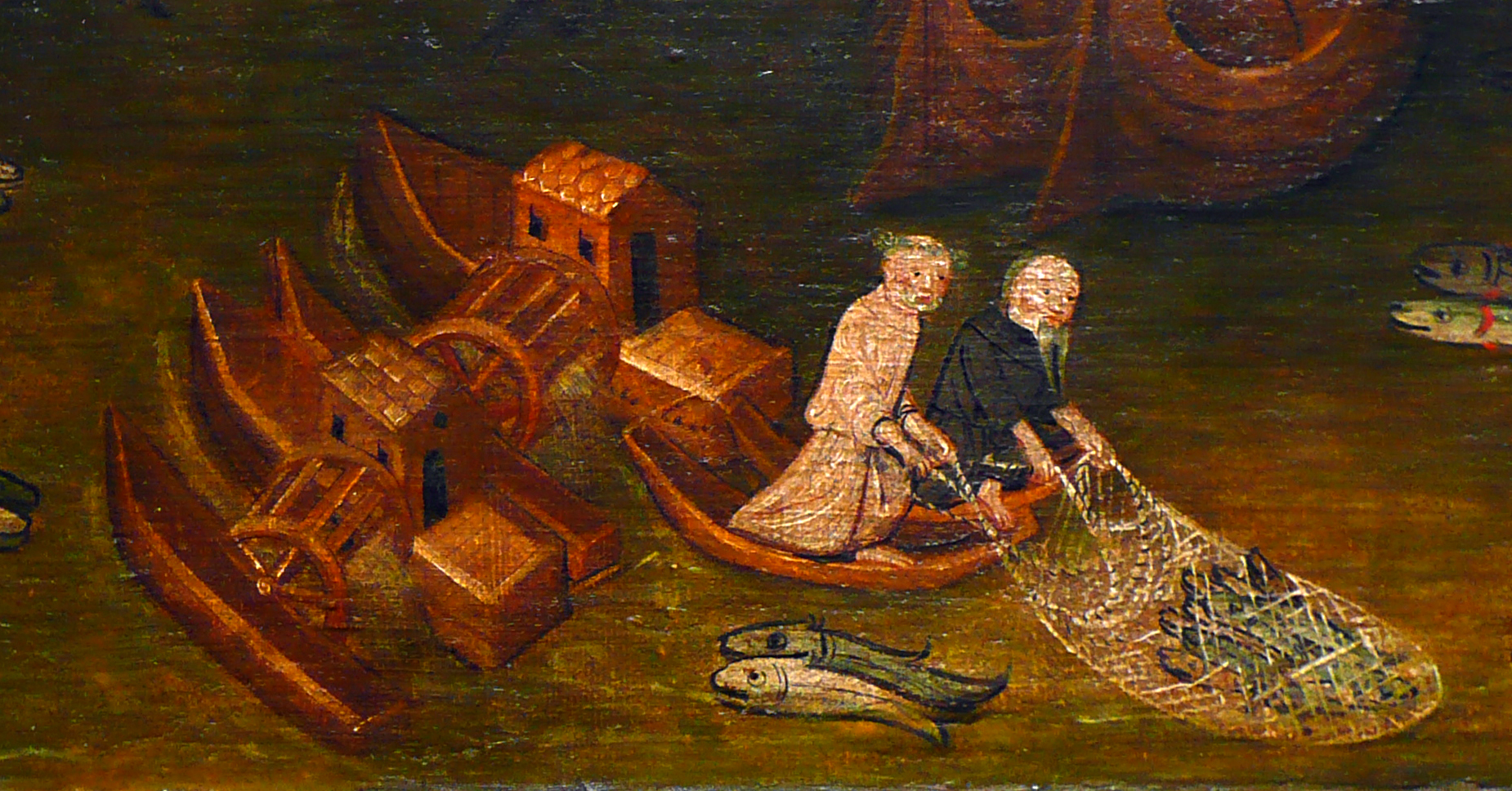
German ship mills on the Rhine, around 1411

The surviving evidence for watermills sharply increases with the emergence of documentary genres such as monastic charters, Christian hagiography and Germanic legal codes. These were more inclined to address watermilling, a mostly rural work process, than the ancient urban-centered literary class had been. By Carolingian times, references to watermills had become "innumerable" in Frankish records. The Domesday Book, compiled in 1086, records 5,624 watermills in England alone. Later research estimates a less conservative number of 6,082 that should be considered a minimum as the northern reaches of England were never properly recorded. In 1300, this number had risen to between 10,000 and 15,000. By the early 7th century, watermills were also well established in Ireland. A century later they began to spread across the former Roman Rhine and Danube frontier into the other parts of Germany. Ship mills and tide mills, both of which yet unattested for the ancient period, were introduced in the 6th century.

Tide mills

In recent years, a number of new archaeological finds has consecutively pushed back the date of the earliest tide mills, all of which were discovered on the Irish coast: A 6th century vertical-wheeled tide mill was located at Killoteran near Waterford. A twin flume horizontal-wheeled tide mill dating to c. 630 was excavated on Little Island. Alongside it, another tide mill was found which was powered by a vertical undershot wheel. The Nendrum Monastery mill from 787 was situated on an island in Strangford Lough in Northern Ireland. Its millstones are 830 mm in diameter and the horizontal wheel is estimated to have developed 7/8 horsepower (650 W) at its peak. Remains of an earlier mill dated at 619 were also found at the site.

Survey of industrial mills

In a 2005 survey the scholar Adam Lucas identified the following first appearances of various industrial mill types in Western Europe. Noticeable is the preeminent role of France in the introduction of new innovative uses of waterpower. However, he has drawn attention to the dearth of studies of the subject in several other countries.

First appearance of various industrial mills in medieval Europe (770–1443)
| Type of mill | Date | Country |
|---|---|---|
| Malt mill | 770 | France |
| Fulling mill | 1080 | France |
| Tanning mill | c. 1134 | France |
| Forge mill | ca. 1200 | England, France |
| Tool-sharpening mill | 1203 | France |
| Hemp mill | 1209 | France |
| Bellows | 1269, 1283 | Slovakia, France |
| Paper mill | 1282 | Spain |
| Sawmill | c. 1300 | France |
| Ore-crushing mill | 1317 | Germany |
| Blast furnace | 1384 | France |
| Cutting and slitting mill | 1443 | France |

=== Ancient East Asia ===
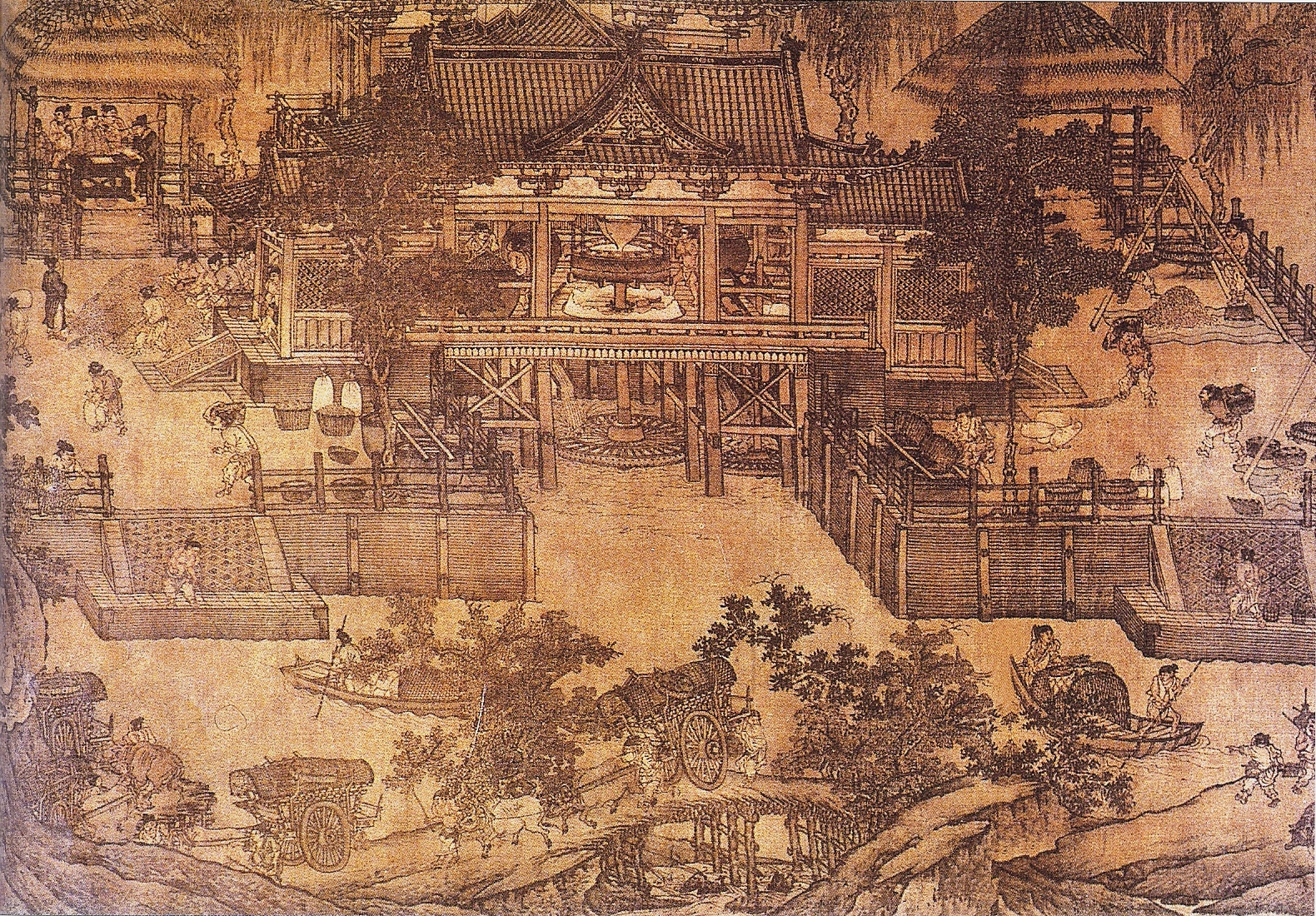
A Northern Song era (960–1127) water-powered mill for dehusking grain with a horizontal wheel

The waterwheel was found in China from 30 AD onwards, when it was used to power trip hammers, the bellows in smelting iron, and in one case, to mechanically rotate an armillary sphere for astronomical observation (see Zhang Heng). Although the British chemist and sinologist Joseph Needham speculates that the water-powered millstone could have existed in Han China by the 1st century AD, there is no sufficient literary evidence for it until the 5th century AD. In 488 AD, the mathematician and engineer Zu Chongzhi had a watermill erected which was inspected by Emperor Wu of Southern Qi (r. 482–493 AD). The engineer Yang Su of the Sui dynasty (581–618 AD) was said to operate hundreds of them by the beginning of the 6th century. A source written in 612 AD mentions Buddhist monks arguing over the revenues gained from watermills. The Tang dynasty (618–907 AD) 'Ordinances of the Department of Waterways' written in 737 AD stated that watermills should not interrupt riverine transport and in some cases were restricted to use in certain seasons of the year. From other Tang-era sources of the 8th century, it is known that these ordinances were taken very seriously, as the government demolished many watermills owned by great families, merchants, and Buddhist abbeys that failed to acknowledge ordinances or meet government regulations. A eunuch serving Emperor Xuanzong of Tang (r. 712–756 AD) owned a watermill by 748 AD which employed five waterwheels that ground 300 bushels of wheat a day. By 610 or 670 AD, the watermill was introduced to Japan via Korean Peninsula. It also became known in Tibet by at least 641 AD.

=== Ancient India ===
According to Greek historical tradition, India received water-mills from the Roman Empire in the early 4th century AD when a certain Metrodoros introduced "water-mills and baths, unknown among them [the Brahmans] till then".

=== West Asia and North Africa ===
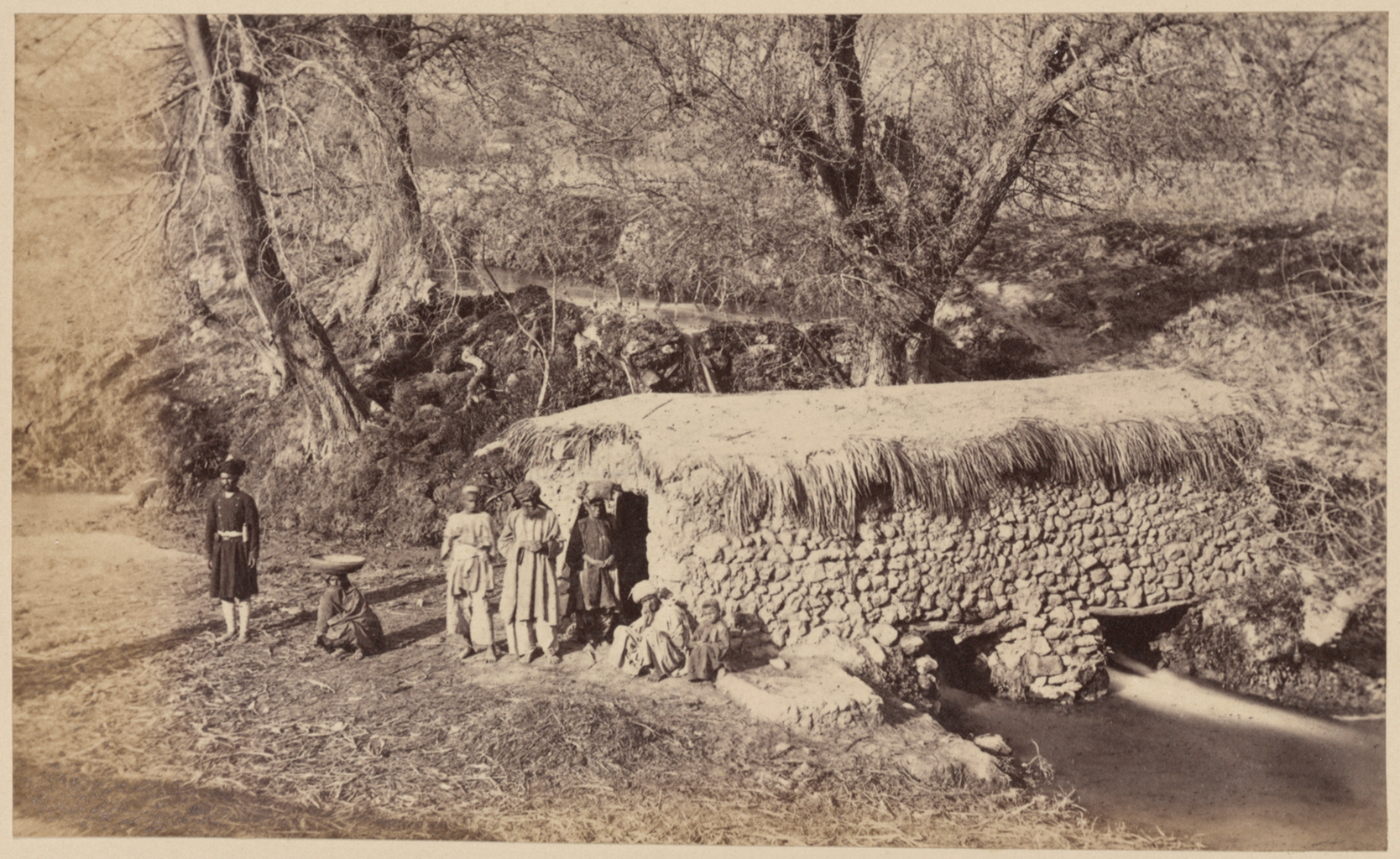
An Afghan water mill photographed during the Second Anglo-Afghan War (1878–1880). The rectangular water mill has a thatched roof and traditional design with a small horizontal mill-house built of stone or perhaps mud bricks.

Engineers under the Caliphates adopted watermill technology from former provinces of the Byzantine Empire, having been applied for centuries in those provinces prior to the Muslim conquests, including modern-day Syria, Jordan, Israel, Algeria, Tunisia, Morocco, and Spain (see List of ancient watermills).

The industrial uses of watermills in the Islamic world date back to the 7th century, while horizontal-wheeled and vertical-wheeled watermills were both in widespread use by the 9th century. A variety of industrial watermills were used in the Islamic world, including gristmills, hullers, sawmills, ship mills, stamp mills, steel mills, sugar mills, and tide mills. By the 11th century, every province throughout the Islamic world had these industrial watermills in operation, from al-Andalus and North Africa to West Asia and Central Asia. Both Muslim and Christian engineers also used crankshafts and water turbines, gears in watermills and water-raising machines, and dams as a source of water, used to provide additional power to watermills and water-raising machines. Fulling mills, and steel mills may have spread from Al-Andalus to Christian Spain in the 12th century. Industrial watermills were also employed in large factory complexes built in al-Andalus between the 11th and 13th centuries.

The engineers of the Islamic world used several solutions to achieve the maximum output from a watermill. One solution was to mount them to piers of bridges to take advantage of the increased flow. Another solution was the ship mill, a type of watermill powered by water wheels mounted on the sides of ships moored in midstream. This technique was employed along the Tigris and Euphrates rivers in 10th-century Iraq, where large ship mills made of teak and iron could produce 10 tons of flour from corn every day for the granary in Baghdad.

=== Iran ===
More than 300 watermills were at work in Iran till 1960. Now only a few are still working. One of the famous ones is the water mill of Askzar and the water mill of Yazd, still producing flour.

== Operation ==
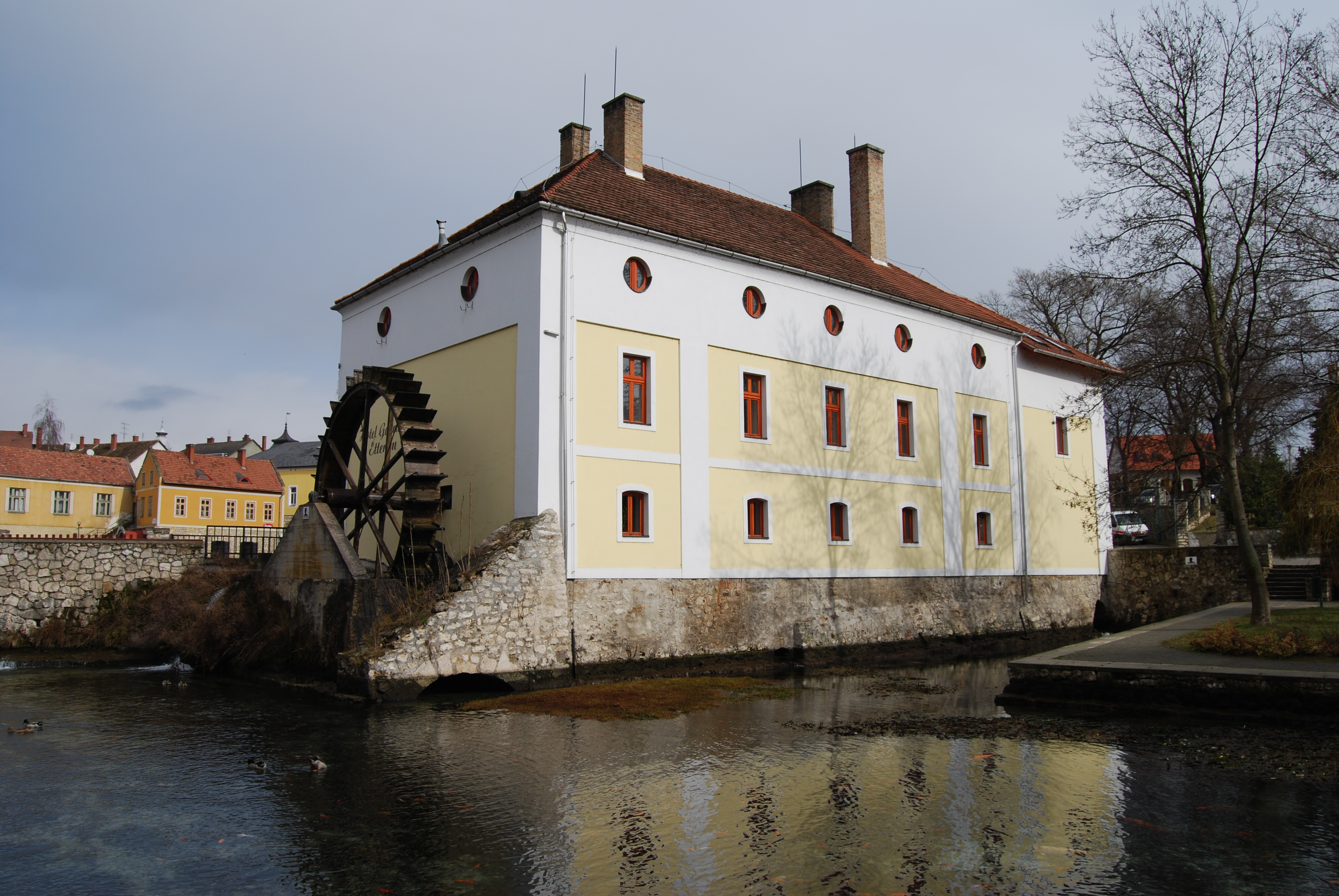
A watermill in Tapolca, Veszprem County, Hungary

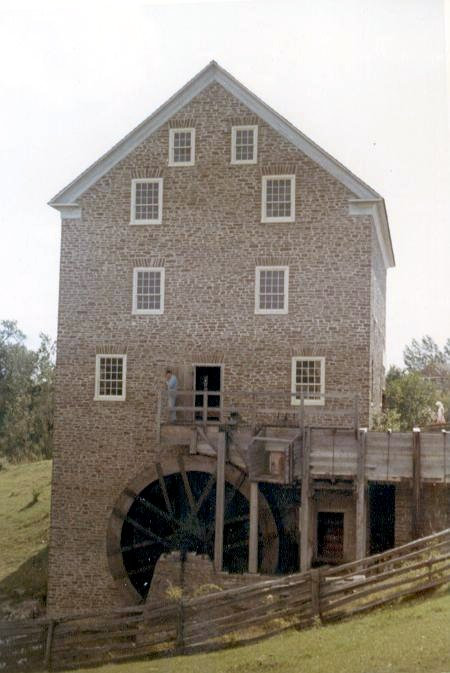
Roblin's Mill, a watermill, at Black Creek Pioneer Village in Toronto, Ontario, Canada

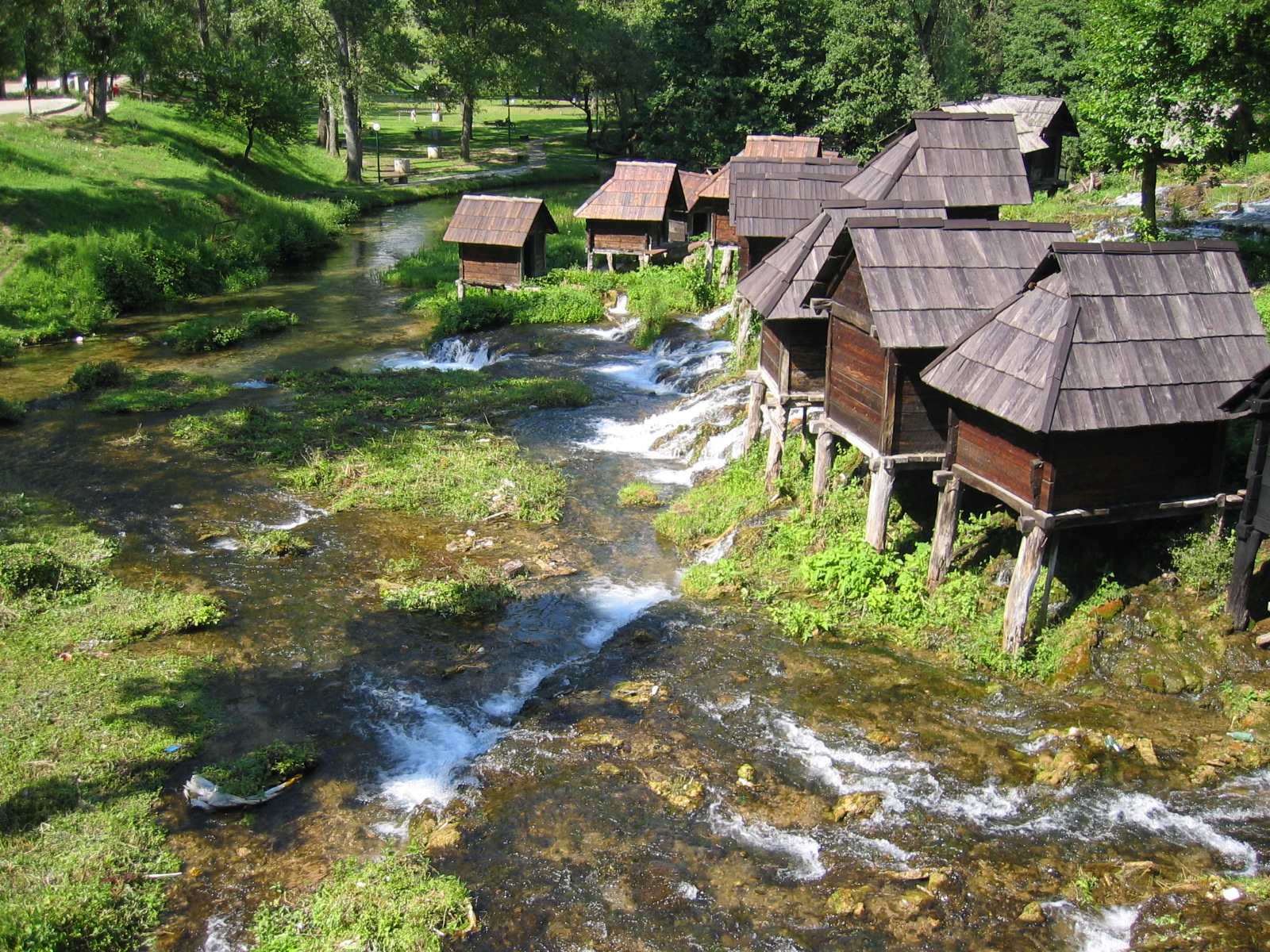
Watermills on the Pliva in Jajce, Bosnia and Herzegovina

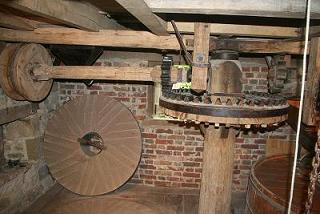
The interior of a functional watermill at Weald and Downland Open Air Museum

Typically, water is diverted from a river or impoundment or mill pond to a turbine or water wheel, along a channel or pipe (variously known as a flume, head race, mill race, leat, leet, lade (Scots) or penstock). The force of the water's movement drives the blades of a wheel or turbine, which in turn rotates an axle that drives the mill's other machinery. Water leaving the wheel or turbine is drained through a tail race, but this channel may also be the head race of yet another wheel, turbine or mill. The passage of water is controlled by sluice gates that allow maintenance and some measure of flood control; large mill complexes may have dozens of sluices controlling complicated interconnected races that feed multiple buildings and industrial processes.

Watermills can be divided into two kinds, one with a horizontal water wheel on a vertical axle, and the other with a vertical wheel on a horizontal axle. The oldest of these were horizontal mills in which the force of the water, striking a simple paddle wheel set horizontally in line with the flow turned a runner stone balanced on the rynd which is atop a shaft leading directly up from the wheel. The bedstone does not turn. The problem with this type of mill arose from the lack of gearing; the speed of the water directly set the maximum speed of the runner stone which, in turn, set the rate of milling.

Most watermills in Britain and the United States of America had a vertical waterwheel, one of four kinds: undershot, breast-shot, overshot and pitchback wheels. This vertical produced rotary motion around a horizontal axis, which could be used (with cams) to lift hammers in a forge, fulling stocks in a fulling mill and so on.

Undershot water wheel, applied for watermilling since the 1st century BC

Overshot water wheel, applied for watermilling since the 1st century BC

Pitchback water wheel, often used to increase the power generated by a breastshot wheel

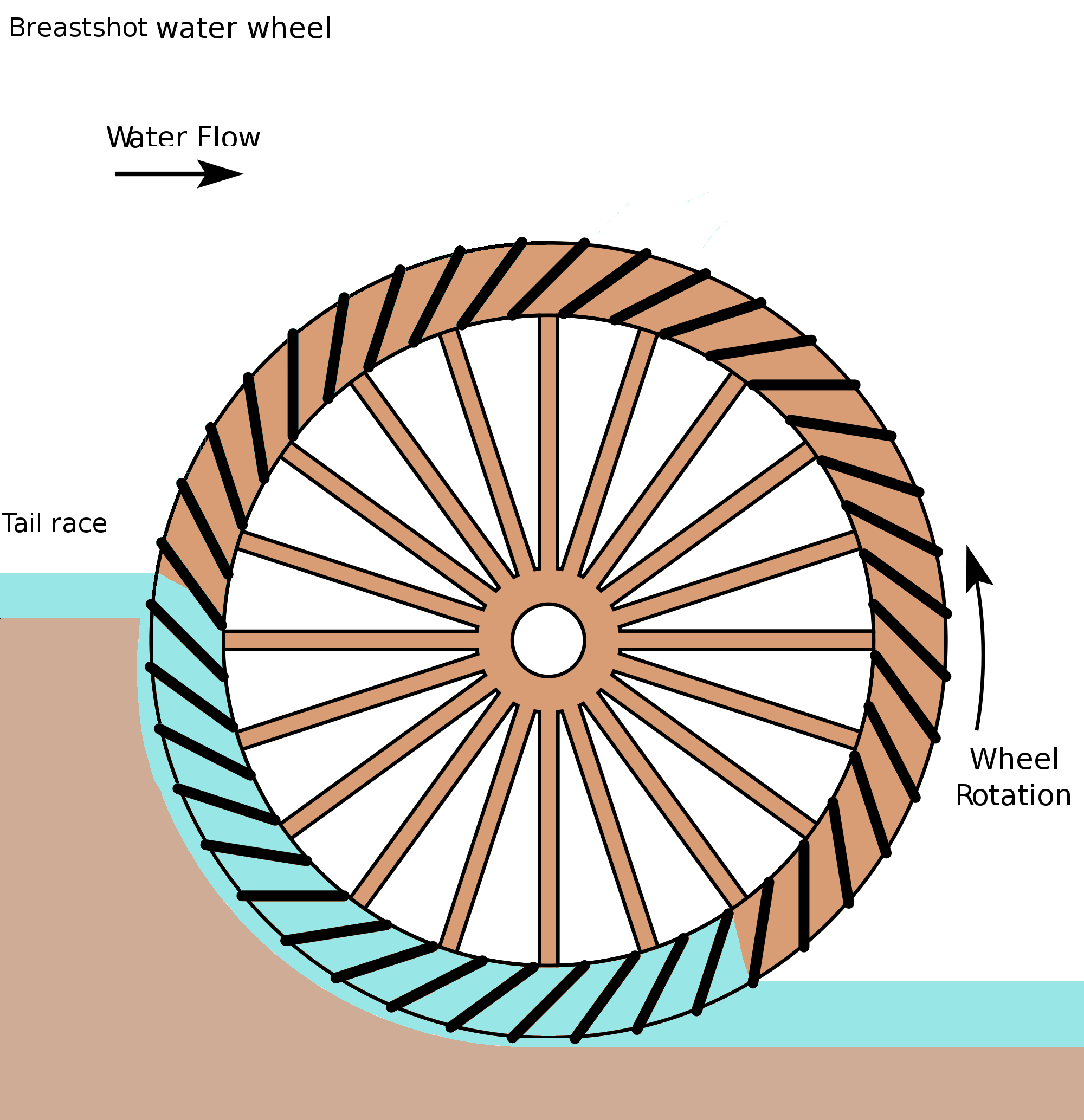
Breastshot water wheel, applied for watermilling since the 3rd century AD

=== Milling corn ===
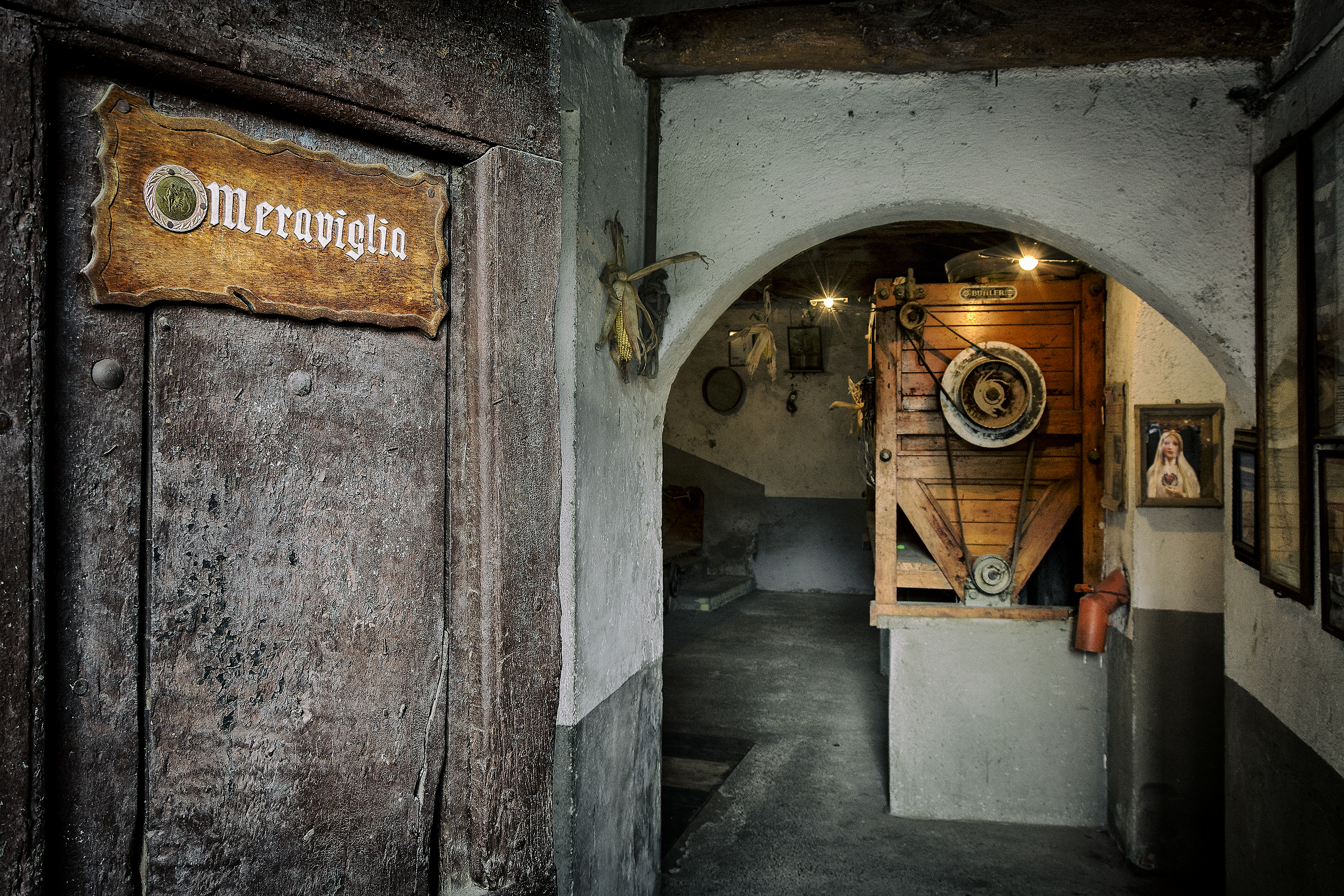
Mulino Meraviglia in San Vittore Olona, Italy, along Olona river

However, in corn mills rotation about a vertical axis was required to drive its stones. The horizontal rotation was converted into the vertical rotation by means of gearing, which also enabled the runner stones to turn faster than the waterwheel. The usual arrangement in British and American corn mills has been for the waterwheel to turn a horizontal shaft on which is also mounted a large pit wheel. This meshes with the wallower, mounted on a vertical shaft, which turns the (larger) great spur wheel (mounted on the same shaft). This large face wheel, set with pegs, in turn, turned a smaller wheel (such as a lantern gear) known as a stone nut, which was attached to the shaft that drove the runner stone. The number of runner stones that could be turned depended directly upon the supply of water available. As waterwheel technology improved mills became more efficient, and by the 19th century, it was common for the great spur wheel to drive several stone nuts, so that a single water wheel could drive as many as four stones. Each step in the process increased the gear ratio which increased the maximum speed of the runner stone. Adjusting the sluice gate and thus the flow of the water past the main wheel allowed the miller to compensate for seasonal variations in the water supply. Finer speed adjustment was made during the milling process by tentering, that is, adjusting the gap between the stones according to the water flow, the type of grain being milled, and the grade of flour required.

In many mills (including the earliest) the great spur wheel turned only one stone, but there might be several mills under one roof. The earliest illustration of a single waterwheel driving more than one set of stones was drawn by Henry Beighton in 1723 and published in 1744 by J. T. Desaguliers.

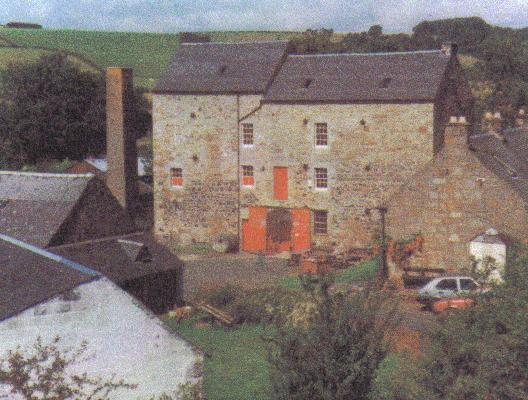
Dalgarven Mill, Ayrshire, United Kingdom

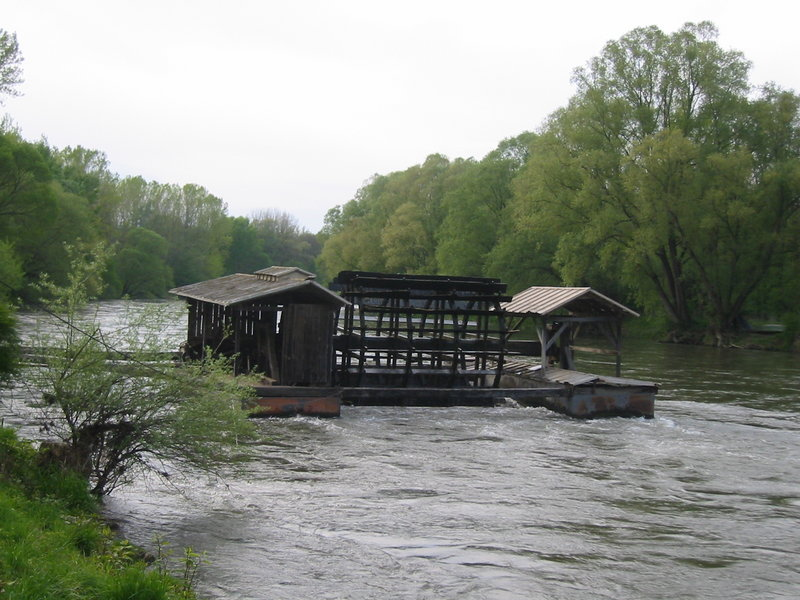
Shipmill on the Mura, Slovenia

=== Overshot and pitchback mills ===
The overshot wheel was a later innovation in waterwheels and was around two and a half times more efficient than the undershot. The undershot wheel, in which the main water wheel is simply set into the flow of the mill race, suffers from an inherent inefficiency stemming from the fact that the wheel itself, entering the water behind the main thrust of the flow driving the wheel, followed by the lift of the wheel out of the water ahead of the main thrust, actually impedes its own operation. The overshot wheel solves this problem by bringing the water flow to the top of the wheel. The water fills buckets built into the wheel, rather than the simple paddle wheel design of undershot wheels. As the buckets fill, the weight of the water starts to turn the wheel. The water spills out of the bucket on the down side into a spillway leading back to river. Since the wheel itself is set above the spillway, the water never impedes the speed of the wheel. The impulse of the water on the wheel is also harnessed in addition to the weight of the water once in the buckets. Overshot wheels require the construction of a dam on the river above the mill and a more elaborate millpond, sluice gate, mill race and spillway or tailrace.

An inherent problem in the overshot mill is that it reverses the rotation of the wheel. If a miller wishes to convert a breastshot mill to an overshot wheel all the machinery in the mill has to be rebuilt to take account of the change in rotation. An alternative solution was the pitchback or backshot wheel. A launder was placed at the end of the flume on the headrace, this turned the direction of the water without much loss of energy, and the direction of rotation was maintained. Daniels Mill near Bewdley, Worcestershire is an example of a flour mill that originally used a breastshot wheel, but was converted to use a pitchback wheel. Today it operates as a breastshot mill.

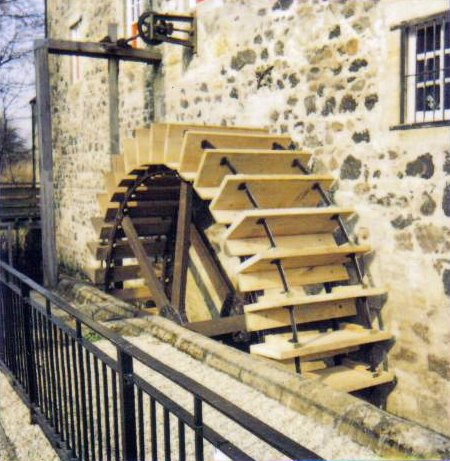
A breastshot waterwheel at Dalgarven Mill, United Kingdom

Larger water wheels (usually overshot steel wheels) transmit the power from a toothed annular ring that is mounted near the outer edge of the wheel. This drives the machinery using a spur gear mounted on a shaft rather than taking power from the central axle. However, the basic mode of operation remains the same; gravity drives machinery through the motion of flowing water.

Toward the end of the 19th century, the invention of the Pelton wheel encouraged some mill owners to replace over- and undershot wheels with Pelton wheel turbines driven through penstocks.

=== Tide mills ===
A different type of watermill is the tide mill. This mill might be of any kind, undershot, overshot or horizontal but it does not employ a river for its power source. Instead a mole or causeway is built across the mouth of a small bay. At low tide, gates in the mole are opened allowing the bay to fill with the incoming tide. At high tide the gates are closed, trapping the water inside. At a certain point a sluice gate in the mole can be opened allowing the draining water to drive a mill wheel or wheels. This is particularly effective in places where the tidal differential is very great, such as the Bay of Fundy in Canada where the tides can rise fifty feet, or the now derelict village of Tide Mills, East Sussex. The last two examples in the United Kingdom which are restored to working conditions can be visited at Eling, Hampshire and at Woodbridge, Suffolk.

Run of the river schemes do not divert water at all and usually involve undershot wheels the mills are mostly on the banks of sizeable rivers or fast flowing streams. Other watermills were set beneath large bridges where the flow of water between the stanchions was faster. At one point London bridge had so many water wheels beneath it that bargemen complained that passage through the bridge was impaired.

== Current status ==
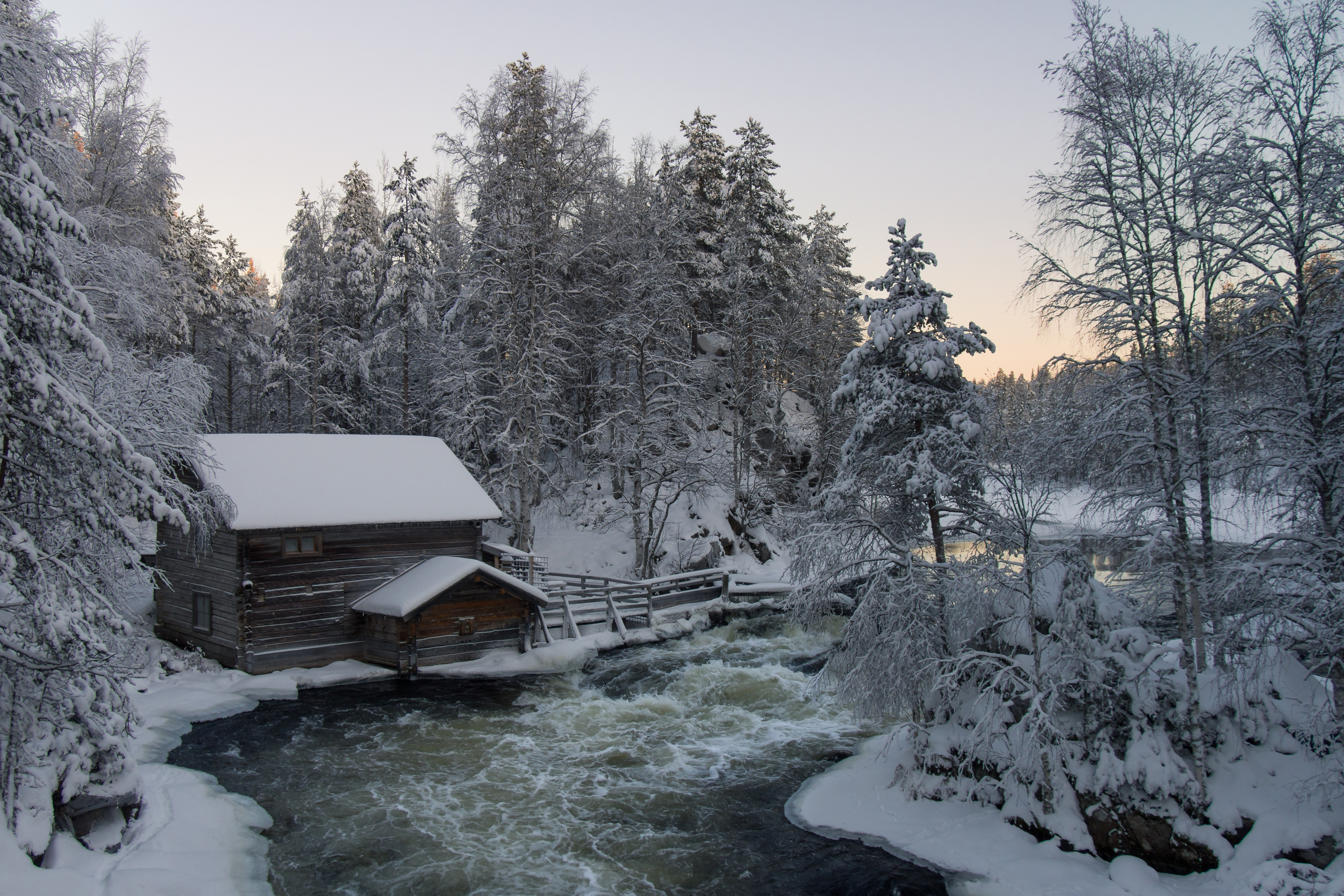
Watermill in Kuusamo (Finland)

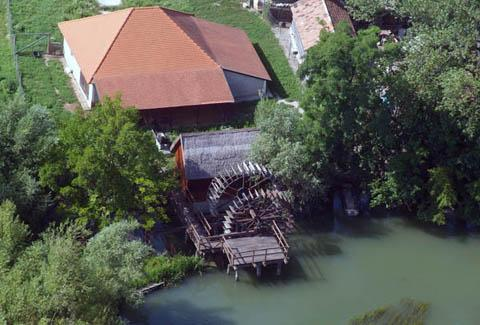
Watermill in Jahodná (Slovakia)

In 1870 watermills still produced 2/3 of the power available for British grain milling. By the early 20th century, availability of cheap electrical energy made the watermill obsolete in developed countries although some smaller rural mills continued to operate commercially later throughout the century.

A few historic mills such as the Water Mill, Newlin Mill and Yates Mill in the US and The Darley Mill Centre in the UK still operate for demonstration purposes. Small-scale commercial production is carried out in the UK at Daniels Mill, Little Salkeld Mill and Redbournbury Mill. This was boosted to overcome flour shortages during the Covid pandemic.

Some old mills are being upgraded with modern hydropower technology, such as those worked on by the South Somerset Hydropower Group in the UK.

In some developing countries, watermills are still widely used for processing grain. For example, there are thought to be 25,000 operating in Nepal, and 200,000 in India. Many of these are still of the traditional style, but some have been upgraded by replacing wooden parts with better-designed metal ones to improve the efficiency. For example, the Centre for Rural Technology in Nepal upgraded 2,400 mills between 2003 and 2007.

== Applications ==
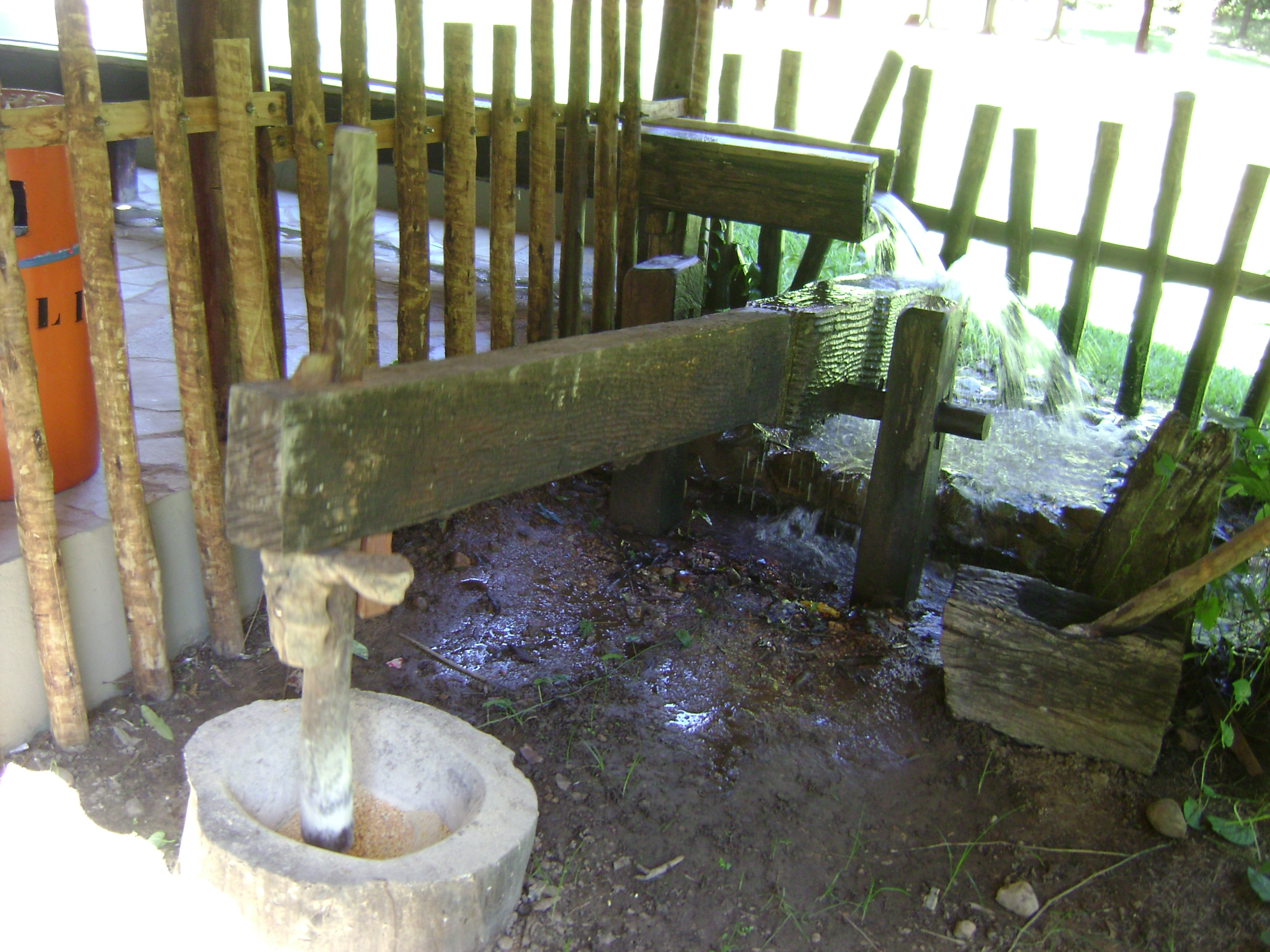
Watermill in Caldas Novas, Brazil

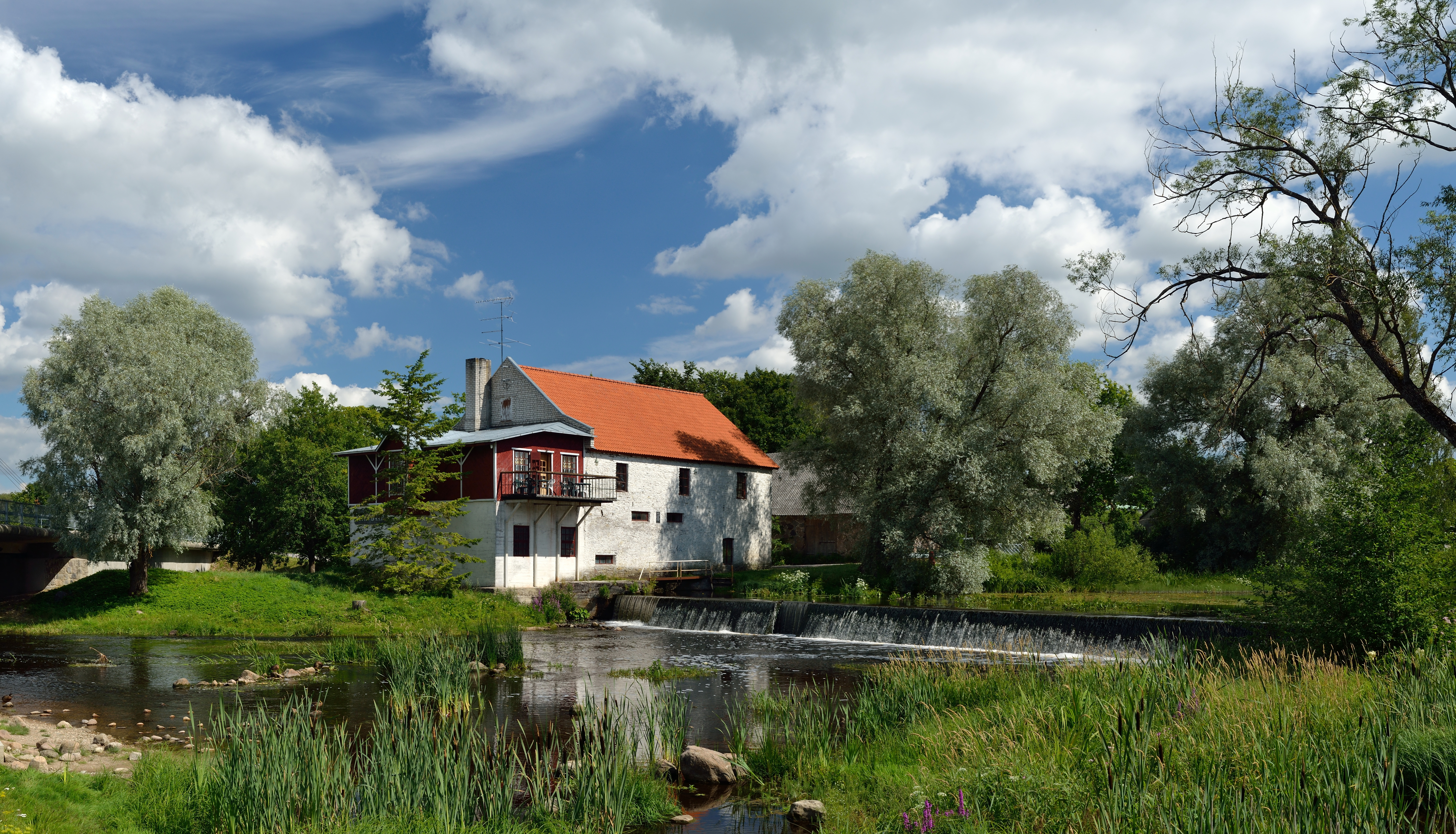
Former watermill in Kohila, Estonia

- Bark mills ground bark, from oak or chestnut trees to produce a coarse powder for use in tanneries.
- Blade mills were used for sharpening newly made blades.
- Blast furnaces, finery forges, and tinplate works were, until the introduction of the steam engine, almost invariably water powered. Furnaces and Forges were sometimes called iron mills.
- Bobbin mills made wooden bobbins for the cotton and other textile industries.
- Carpet mills for making carpets and rugs were sometimes water-powered.
- Cotton mills were driven by water. The power was used to card the raw cotton, and then to drive the spinning mules and ring frames. Steam engines were initially used to increase the water flow to the wheel, then as the Industrial Revolution progressed, to directly drive the shafts.
- Fulling or walk mills were used for a finishing process on woollen cloth.
- Gristmills, or corn mills, grind grains into flour.
- Lead was usually smelted in smeltmills prior to the introduction of the cupola (a reverberatory furnace).
- Needle mills for scouring needles during manufacture were mostly water-powered (such as Forge Mill Needle Museum)
- Oil mills for crushing oil seeds might be wind or water-powered
- Paper mills used water not only for motive power, but also required it in large quantities in the manufacturing process.
- Powder mills for making gunpowder - black powder or smokeless powder were usually water-powered.
- Rolling mills shaped metal by passing it between rollers.
- Sawmills cut timber into lumber.
- Slitting mills were used for slitting bars of iron into rods, which were then made into nails.
- Spoke mills turned lumber into spokes for carriage wheels.
- Stamp mills for crushing ore, usually from non-ferrous mines
- Textile mills for spinning yarn or weaving cloth were sometimes water-powered.

== See also ==
- Horse mill
- List of watermills
- Mill (heraldry)
- Molinology
- Scoop wheel
- Sutter's Mill
- Windmill
- List of tide mills on Long Island
