= Daniels Mill =

Daniels Mill may refer to:

- Daniels Mill, Shropshire, a watermill near Bridgnorth in the English county of Shropshire
- Daniels Mill (Daniels, Maryland), a place on the List of Registered Historic Places in the US state of Maryland
