= Buttrum's Mill, Woodbridge =

Windmill in Woodbridge, Suffolk, England

Trott's Mill Buttrum's Mill
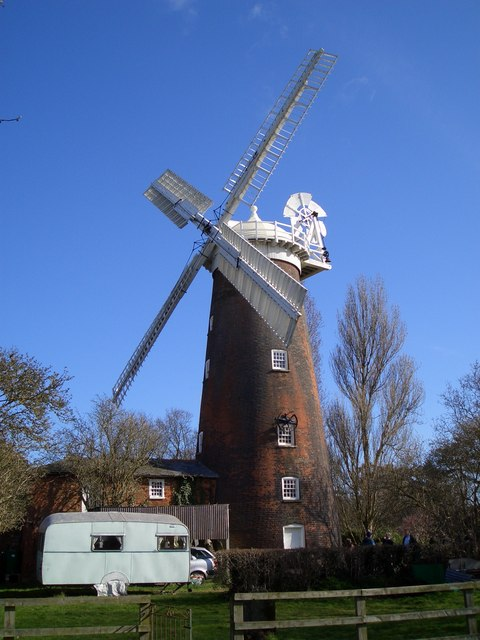
- The mill in 2006
- Interactive map of Trott's Mill; Buttrum's Mill

Origin
- Mill location: TM 264 493
- Coordinates: 52.0956°N 1.3045°E
- Operator: Suffolk County Council
- Year built: 1836

Information
- Purpose: Corn mill
- Type: Tower mill
- Storeys: Six storeys
- No. of sails: Four Sails
- Type of sails: Patent sails
- Windshaft: Cast Iron
- Winding: Fantail
- Fantail blades: Six Blades
- Auxiliary power: Portable steam engine
- No. of pairs of millstones: Four pairs
- Size of millstones: All 4 feet (1.22 m) diameter
- Other information: Tallest surviving windmill in Suffolk

Buttrum's Mill or Trott's Mill is a Grade II* listed tower mill at Woodbridge, Suffolk, England, which has been restored to working order.

== History ==
Buttrum's Mill was built in 1836 by John Whitmore, the Wickham Market millwright, replacing an earlier post mill. The mill was run for many years by the Trott family, for whom it was built, and later by the Buttrum family.

It worked by wind until 11 October 1928. The shutters were removed from the sails in 1934 and stored in the mill. The mill was bought at auction in 1937 by Mr Kenney, a mill enthusiast. The fantail was blown off in the 1940s, damaging the cap. A lease on the mill was granted to East Suffolk County Council in 1950. The council aimed to preserve an example of each main type of windmill. The derelict mill was restored from 1952 by Thomas Smithdale and Sons, the Acle, Norfolk millwrights for East Suffolk County Council. The work, costing £4,000 was completed in 1954. It was part funded by the Pilgrim Trust. The wrought iron gallery round the cap was replaced with a wooden one. A new cap and fantail was built. The fantail was damaged in a gale in December 1966 and in 1973 a new stock and sail were fitted. In the late 1970s, further restoration work was carried out by Millwrights International Ltd. A new cap was craned onto the mill in 1982 and new sails were fitted in 1984.

== Description ==
Buttrum's Mill is a six-storey tower mill with an ogee cap with a gallery. The tower is 20 feet 6 inches (6.25 m) diameter internally at the base and 11 feet (3.35 m) diameter at curb level. It is 48 feet (14.63 m) high to the curb. The brickwork is 23 inches (580 mm) thick at the base. The mill stands 61 feet (18.59 m) to the finial, the tallest surviving mill in Suffolk. The cap is winded by a six-bladed fantail. The four Patent sails of 70 feet (21.34 m) span are carried on a cast-iron windshaft, as is the cast-iron brake wheel with wooden cogs. This drives a cast-iron wallower carried on the cast-iron upright shaft. The wallower can be disengaged from the brake wheel to allow the mill to be driven by auxiliary power. Lower down the upright shaft a cast-iron crown wheel drives auxiliary machinery via layshafts. The cast-iron great spur wheel drives four pairs of 4-foot-diameter (1.22 m) overdrift millstones. Two of the four pairs of millstones are controlled by a single governor. The mill is unusual in having a speaking tube connecting the floors. One of the pairs of sales is shorter than the other pair.

== Millers ==
- George Trott 1836–46
- Pierce Trott 1846–61
- William Benns 1861–68
- John Buttrum 1869–84
- Mary Ann Buttrum, 1885–1908
- George Buttrum 1908–28

== Public access ==
2015 expected guided opening 1st and 3rd Sundays May to September, 1 to 5 pm. Extra openings for Maritime Woodbridge and National Heritage Open Days, from a volunteer. During 2011 Buttrum's Mill was open between 14:00 and 17:30 over Easter, and Saturdays, Sundays and Bank Holiday from May to September. It is open from 11:00 to 17:00 on National Mills Weekend.

== See also ==
Other mills in, or strongly connected with, Woodbridge:

- Tricker's Mill, Woodbridge
- Woodbridge Tide Mill
- Ramsey Windmill, Essex
