= Tricker's Mill, Woodbridge =

Windmill in Woodbridge, Suffolk, England

Tricker's Mill
- The mill in the housing complex

Origin
- Mill location: TM 268 491
- Coordinates: 52°05′37″N 1°18′43″E
- Year built: 1818; 207 years ago

Information
- Purpose: Corn mill
- Type: Tower mill
- Storeys: Five storeys
- No. of sails: Four Sails
- Type of sails: Patent sails
- Windshaft: Cast Iron
- Winding: Fantail
- No. of pairs of millstones: Three pairs

Tricker's Mill is a Grade II listed tower mill at Woodbridge, Suffolk, England which has been converted into holiday accommodation.

== History ==
Tricker's Mill was built in 1818. It originally had a domed cap which was blown off in 1881. A boat shaped cap was built to replace it. The mill worked by wind until c1920, with the cap and remaining pair of sails being removed in 1957, leaving the roofed over cap frame on the tower. In 1973, the mill was threatened with demolition but due to pressure from enthusiasts it was incorporated into Mussidan Place, a sheltered housing scheme for the elderly. In 2011 Flagship Housing who run the sheltered housing decide to sell the Mill. W & T Catchpole, having bought the Mill, commission architect Tim Buxbaum and J P Chick & Sons Structural Engineers to liaise with Mark Barnard from Suffolk Coastal on emergency restoration work. Paul Rust commences work to repair and stabilise the mill in January 2012. By March 2016 the work has been completed and the mill is available to rent as holiday accommodation.

== Description ==
Tricker's Mill is a five storey tower mill which formerly had a boat shaped cap with a gallery which was winded by a fantail. It had four Patent sails and drove three pairs of millstones, of which two pairs remain. The cast iron windshaft had previously been used in a post mill. The majority of the machinery survives in the mill.

== See also ==
Other mills in, or strongly connected with Woodbridge:-

- Buttrum's Mill, Woodbridge
- Woodbridge Tide Mill
- Ramsey Windmill, Essex
