= Tide mill =

Type of watermill

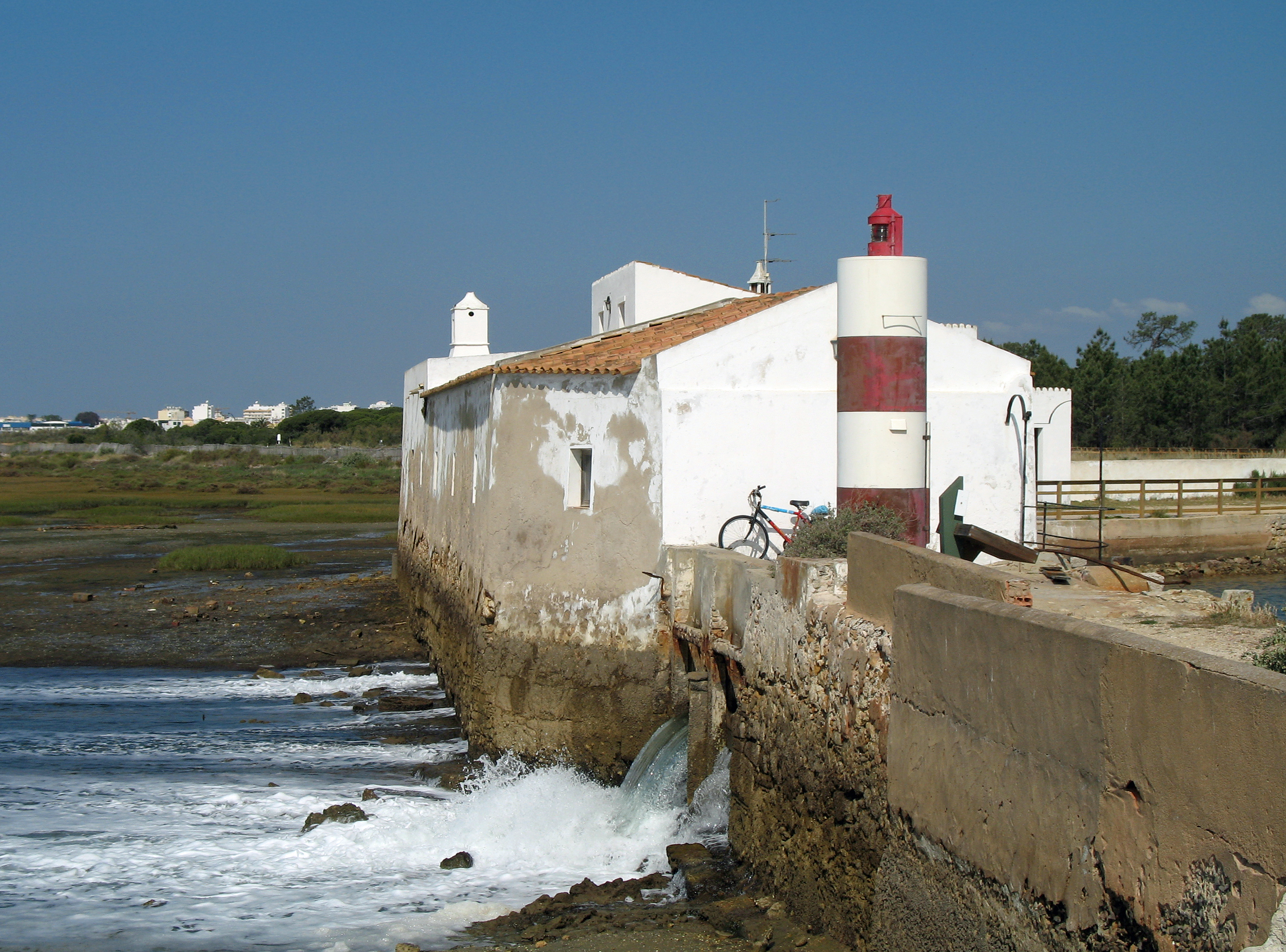
Tidal mill at Olhão, Portugal

A tide mill is a water mill driven by tidal rise and fall. A dam with a sluice is created across a suitable tidal inlet, or a section of river estuary is made into a reservoir. As the tide comes in, it enters the mill pond through a one-way gate, and this gate closes automatically when the tide begins to fall. When the tide is low enough, the stored water can be released to turn a water wheel.

Tide mills are usually situated in river estuaries, away from the effects of waves but close enough to the sea to have a reasonable tidal range. Cultures that built such mills have existed since the Middle Ages, and some may date back to the Roman period.

A modern version of a tide mill is the electricity-generating tidal barrage.

== Early history ==
Possibly the earliest tide mill in the Roman world was located in London on the River Fleet, dating to Roman times.

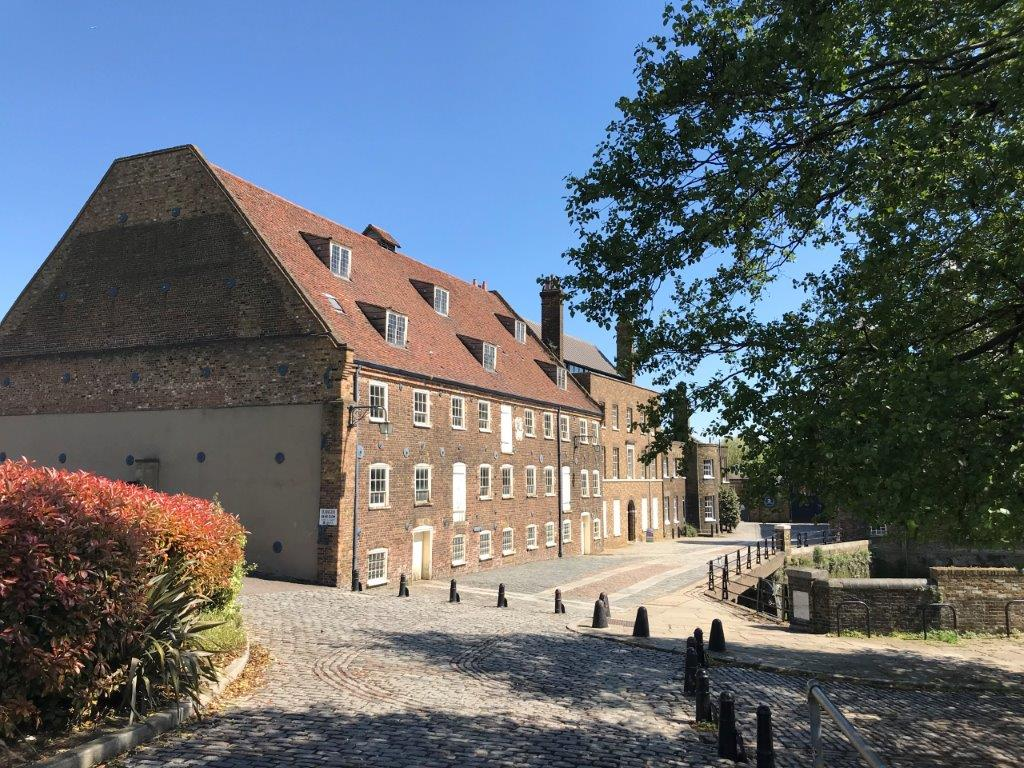
Three Mills, Stratford, one of the world's earliest recorded tide mills.

Since the late 20th century, a number of new archaeological finds have consecutively pushed back the date of the earliest tide mills, all of which were discovered on the Irish coast: A 6th-century vertical-wheeled tide mill was located at Killoteran near Waterford. A twin-flume, horizontal-wheeled tide mill, dating to c. 630, was excavated on Little Island in Cork. Alongside it, another tide mill was found that was powered by a vertical undershot wheel. The Nendrum Monastery mill from 787 was situated on an island in Strangford Lough in Northern Ireland. Its millstones are 830mm in diameter and the horizontal wheel is estimated to have developed 7–8 horsepower (5.2–6.0 kW) at its peak. Remains of an earlier mill dated at 619 were also found at the site.

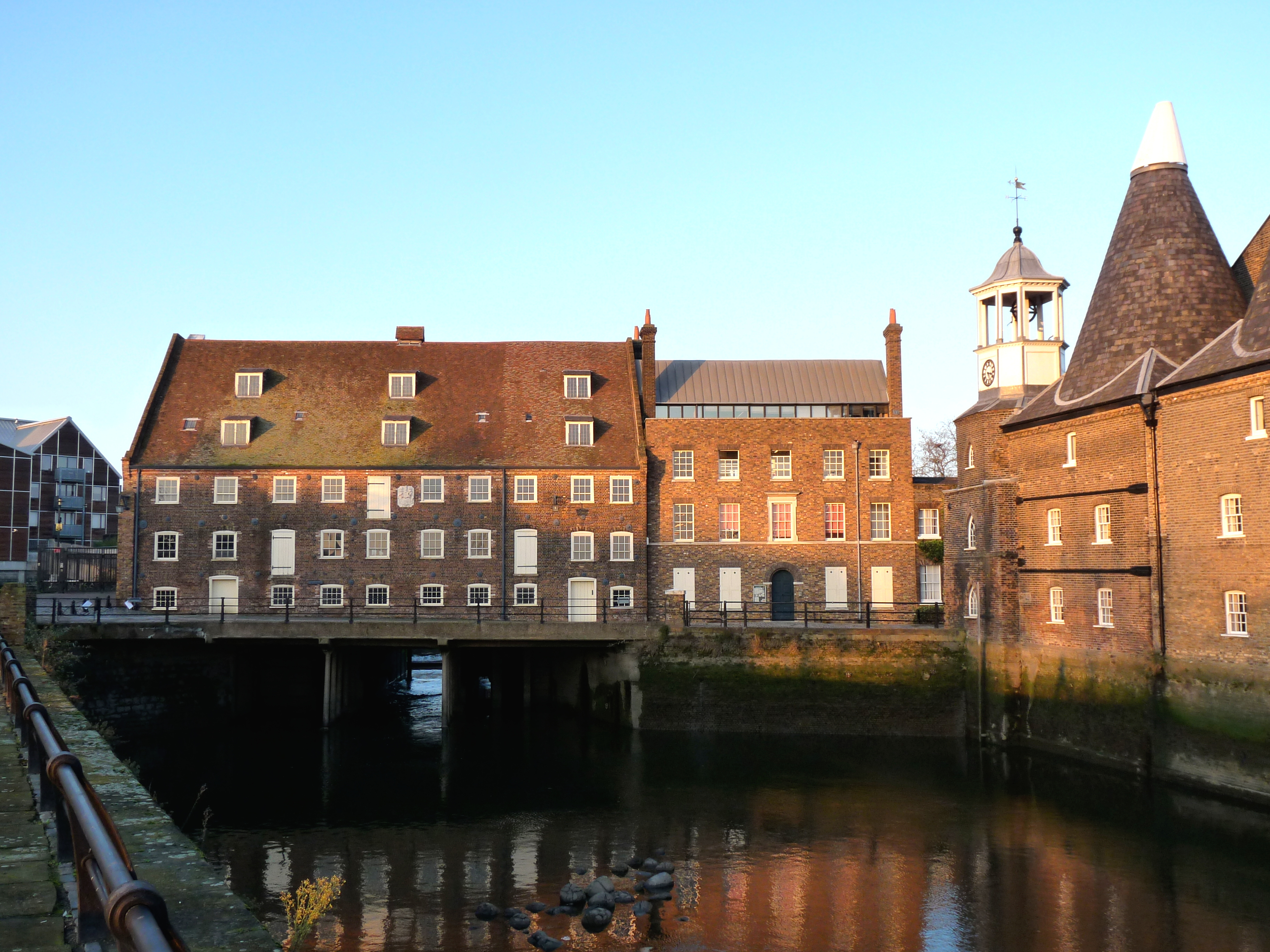
Three Mills, House Mill and Miller's House at low tide

In England, an exceptionally well preserved tidal mill, dated by dendrochronology to the late 7th century (691-692 AD) was excavated in the Ebbsfleet Valley (a minor tributary of the River Thames) in Kent during construction of the Ebbsfleet International Station, on the High Speed 1 railway line The earliest recorded tide mills in England are listed in the Domesday Book (1086). Eight mills are recorded on the River Lea (the site at Three Mills remains, with Grade I listed buildings and a small museum), as well as a mill in Dover harbour. By the 18th century, there were about 76 tide mills in London, including two on London Bridge.

Tide mills in southern Iraq, positioned at the mouth of the Tigris-Euphrates river delta in Basra, were described in 960.

Woodbridge Tide Mill, an excellent example, survives at Woodbridge, Suffolk, England. This mill, dating from 1170 and reconstructed in 1792, has been preserved and is open to the public. It was further restored in 2010 and re-opened in 2011 in full working order. It is the second working tide mill in the United Kingdom that is regularly producing flour. Carew Castle in Wales also has an intact tide mill, but it is not operating. The first tide mill to be restored to working order is Eling Tide Mill in Eling, Hampshire. Another example, now extant only in historic documents, is the mill in the hamlet of Tide Mills, East Sussex. Traces of a tide mill may be seen at Fife Ness, revealed through an archaeological survey

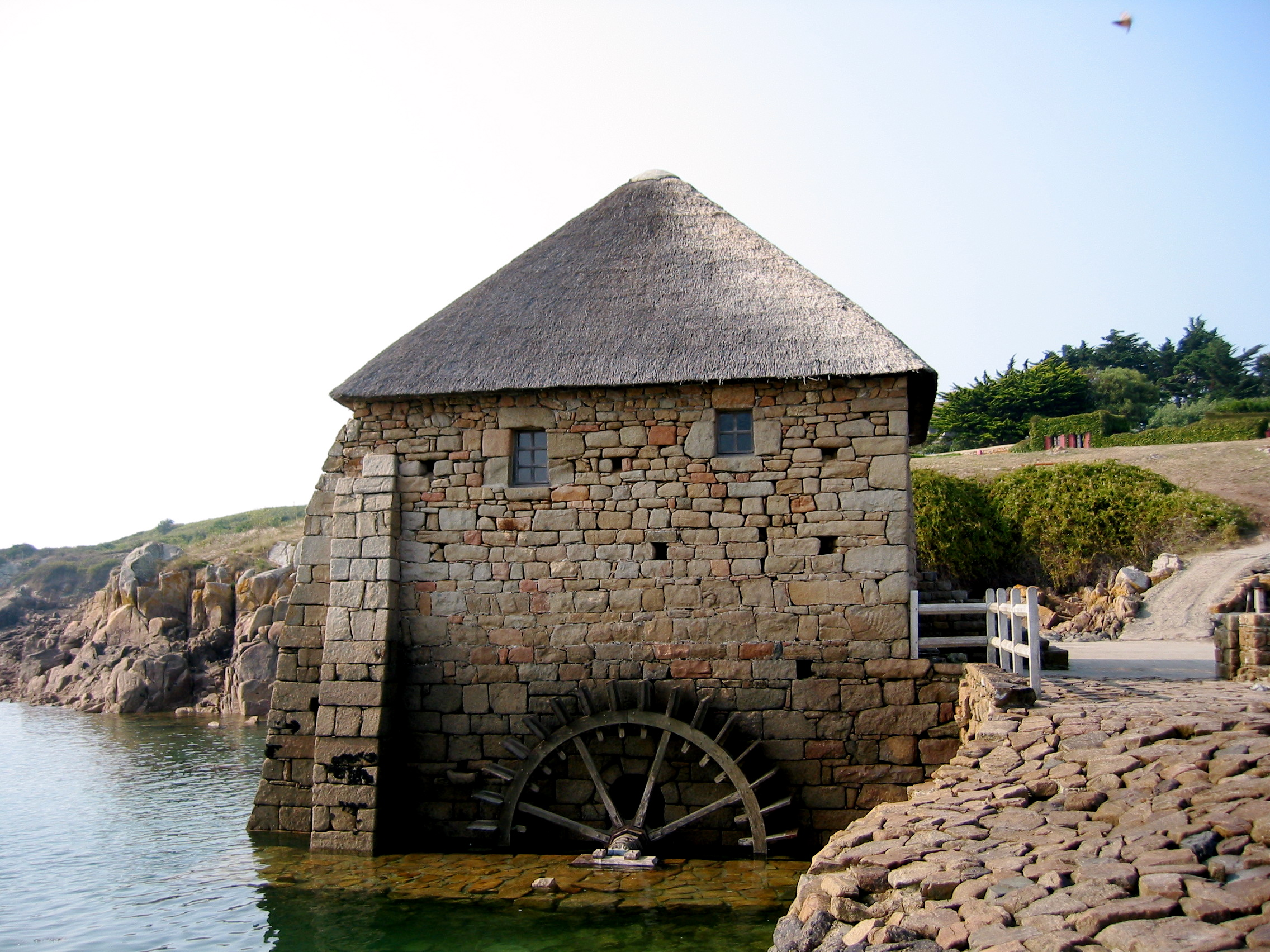
Tidal mill at l'île de Bréhat

and the Fish Pond at Culross has been identified as probably having been built originally as a tide mil by Sir George Bruce.

A medieval tide mill still operates at Rupelmonde near Antwerp, and there are several that have survived in the Netherlands.

At one time there were 750 tide mills operating along the shores of the Atlantic Ocean:

- around 300 in North America, including many in colonial Boston over a 150-year span.
- 200 have been documented in the British Isles, and 100 in France. The Rance estuary in France was also home to some of these mills.

Although tide mills were few in number in Australia, the technology was used by colonial settlers during the 19th century. Singleton's mill was a tide mill located on Laybury's Creek, a right bank tributary of the tidal portion of the Hawkesbury River, in an area known now as Singletons Mill.

By the mid-20th century, the use of water mills had declined dramatically. In 1938, an investigation by Rex Wailes discovered that of the 23 extant tidal mills in England, only 10 were still working by their own motive power. Of one at Beaulieu, H. J. Massingham wrote in the 1940s,

Part of the mill is built on piles into the river and is weatherboarded, while the rest of the building is a warm red brick roofed with lozenge-shaped and rounded tiles which I believe are called fish-tiles. All the interior is of wood – ladders, bins for the meal, floor-boarding, square pillars, beams, narrow passages, fittings, shaft rising to the first floor and all. So ramshackle is the arrangement of the props and supports that it is a wonder that the whole edifice does not tumble about the miller's ears like a pack of cards. The point is that it has stood in this way for something like six centuries, and that gives the explorer into its dusky depths a more penetrating notion of how the old builders could build, more than does a Gothic church or even a cathedral. The pulse and swing of the great wheel sets the whole building in an ague, but it will still be standing when all the flimsy excrescences of development between Beaulieu and Poole have fallen down.

== Modern examples ==
Newer tidal power projects apply the same principles of tide mills on a larger scale.

One major example is the Rance tidal power plant in Brittany, France, which opened in 1966 with 24 turbines and a peak capacity of 240 MW. It remains one of the most successful tidal barrage installations.

Another example is SeaGen, a tidal stream turbine installed in 2008 in Strangford Lough, Northern Ireland. With a capacity of 1.2 MW, it operated successfully until its decommissioning in 2019.

These projects illustrate how the same tidal principles that powered historic tide mills are now adapted for modern renewable energy generation.

== Surviving tide mills in Britain ==
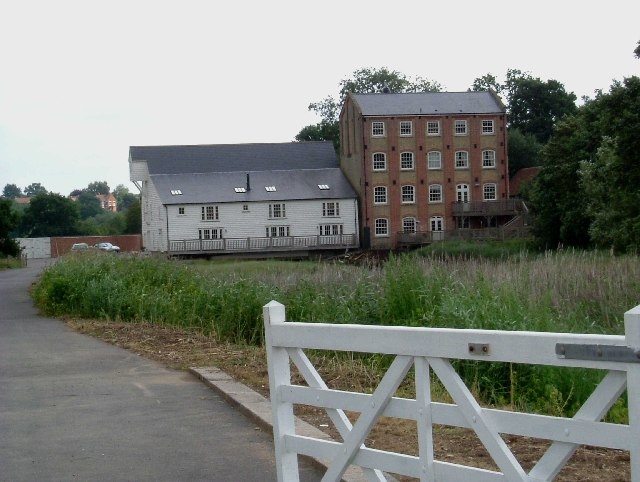
Fingringoe Tide Mill

- Ashlett Tide Mill, Ashlett, Hampshire (converted as clubhouse)
- Battlesbridge Tide Mill, Battlesbridge, Essex (converted for business)
- Carew Castle tide mill, Pembrokeshire
- Eling Tide Mill, Eling, Hampshire (operation temporarily suspended due to a maintenance issue)
- Fingringhoe Tide Mill, Fingringhoe, Essex (house converted)
- Newhaven Tide Mills, otherwise simply Tide Mills, East Sussex (sluice only)
- Pembroke tide mill, Pembrokeshire (mill ponds only)
- Place Mill, Christchurch, Dorset (working order, restored)
- Quay Mill, Emsworth, Hampshire (converted as clubhouse)
- Three Mills tide mill, Bromley-by-Bow, London
- Thorrington Tide Mill, Thorrington, Essex
- Woodbridge Tide Mill, Woodbridge, Suffolk (working order)

== See also ==
- Watermills in the United Kingdom
- Windmill
- Horse mill

== Sources ==
- McErlean, Thomas; Crothers, Norman (2007), Harnessing the Tides: The Early Medieval Tide Mills at Nendrum Monastery, Strangford Lough, Belfast: Stationery Office Books, ISBN 978-0-337-08877-3
- Murphy, Donald (2005), Excavations of a Mill at Killoteran, Co. Waterford as Part of the N-25 Waterford By-Pass Project (PDF), Estuarine/ Alluvial Archaeology in Ireland. Towards Best Practice, University College Dublin and National Roads Authority, archived from the original (PDF) on 2007-11-18
- Rynne, Colin (2000), "Waterpower in Medieval Ireland", in Squatriti, Paolo (ed.), Working with Water in Medieval Europe, Technology and Change in History, vol. 3, Leiden: Brill, pp. 1–50, ISBN 90-04-10680-4
- Spain, Rob: "A possible Roman Tide Mill", Paper submitted to the Kent Archaeological Society
- Wikander, Örjan (1985), "Archaeological Evidence for Early Water-Mills. An Interim Report", History of Technology, vol. 10, pp. 151–179
