= Listed buildings in Eardington =

Eardington is a civil parish in Shropshire, England. It contains 14 listed buildings that are recorded in the National Heritage List for England. Of these, two are at Grade II*, the middle of the three grades, and the others are at Grade II, the lowest grade. The parish contains the village of Eardington and the surrounding countryside. The listed buildings consist of houses, farmhouses, a public house, a bridge, and a mill and mill house.

== Key ==
Grade	Criteria
II*	Particularly important buildings of more than special interest
II	Buildings of national importance and special interest

== Buildings ==
Name and location	Photograph	Date	Notes	Grade
Smithy Cottage; 52.51087°N 2.40979°W	—	Late 16th century (probable)	A timber framed cottage with brick infill, it has one storey and an attic, and a coped gable on the left. There are two casement windows, a gabled dormer, and a modern porch.	II
Halfway House Inn; 52.51450°N 2.43083°W		1620	The public house has been considerably altered. It is roughcast with a tile roof. There are two storeys, two unequal gabled bays, the left being the larger, and a single-storey extension to the left. The doorway in the left bay has a wooden moulded surround, and the windows are casements with small panes.	II
Hay Farm House; 52.49900°N 2.39752°W	—	17th century	The original part of the house is in stone with mullioned and transomed windows. It was extended later in red brick in Georgian style; this part has casement windows with segmental lintels, and hipped dormers. The roof is tiled and the doorway has a pedimented hood.	II
Moor Ridding Farm House; 52.51505°N 2.42269°W	—	17th century	The farmhouse is partly timber framed, partly in brick and partly in stone, and has a tile roof. It has an L-shaped plan, two storeys, and contains two modern casement windows.	II
Post Office; 52.51120°N 2.40893°W		17th century (probable)	The post office is timber framed with brick infill and a tile roof. There are two storeys and it contains modern casement windows.	II
Grange Farm House; 52.51029°N 2.40890°W	—	18th century	The farmhouse is in red brick with rusticated stone quoins, a moulded eaves cornice, and a hipped tile roof. There are two storeys and an attic, and a symmetrical front of five bays, the middle three bays projecting and pedimented, with a round window in the pediment. The central doorway has a pediment, the windows are sashes with keyblocks, and there are two box dormers.	II*
Walls, railings and gates, Grange Farm House; 52.51017°N 2.40930°W	—	18th century	The walls are in brick. At the sides of the front garden are high walls, and along the front of the garden are low walls with piers and wrought iron railings. The double gates are also in wrought iron and have openwork posts.	II
Manor Farm House; 52.51191°N 2.41169°W	—	18th century	The farm house was extended in about 1825. It is in brick with a hipped slate roof. There two storeys, a front of three bays, the left bay gabled and projecting, and a rear wing. The windows are sashes, and the rear wing has dentilled eaves.	II
Eardington House and Outbuildings; 52.51256°N 2.41119°W	—	Late 18th century	The house is rendered with moulded eaves, and a tile roof. There are three storeys, a front of three bays, and full height pilasters with moulded capitals near the corners. At the centre is a porch with Tuscan columns, and the windows are sashes in architraves. Adjoining the house are coach buildings.	II*
Eardington Villa; 52.51420°N 2.41271°W	—	Late 18th century	A brick house, partly roughcast, with a tile roof. There are two storeys and an attic, and three bays. Above the central bay is a pediment containing a lunette. In the ground floor are two canted bay windows with Gothic glazing. In the centre of the upper floor is a Venetian window, the outer windows are casements with segmental heads, and there are two gabled dormers.	II
Marlbrook Bridge; 52.51147°N 2.43273°W		Late 18th century	The bridge carries the B4363 road over the Mor Brook. It is in stone, and consists of two round-headed arches with a cutwater.	II
Red House Farm House; 52.51230°N 2.41056°W	—	Late 18th or early 19th century	The farmhouse is in red brick with a dentil eaves cornice, and a tile roof with coped gables. There are two storeys and an attic, a front of three bays, two rear gabled wings, and a rear outshut. The central doorway has a hood on brackets, the windows are casements with segmental heads, and there are two gabled dormers.	II
The Knowle; 52.52163°N 2.41447°W	—	Early 19th century	A brick house with a double-span slate roof. It has three storeys and three bays. The central doorway has moulded jambs, a fanlight, and a pediment. It is flanked by bay windows, and the other windows are sashes with rusticated lintels and keyblocks.	II
Daniels Mill and Millhouse; 52.52286°N 2.41739°W		1854–55	The mill and mill house are stuccoed. The house has one storey over a basement and a projecting gabled wing. The attached mill has four storeys, and contains windows including one with a pointed arch and Gothic glazing. The breastshot mill wheel is in cast and wrought iron and is 38 feet (12 m) in diameter.	II
