= Woodbridge Tide Mill =

Tide mill in Woodbridge, United Kingdom

Coordinates: 52.0901°N 1.3209°E

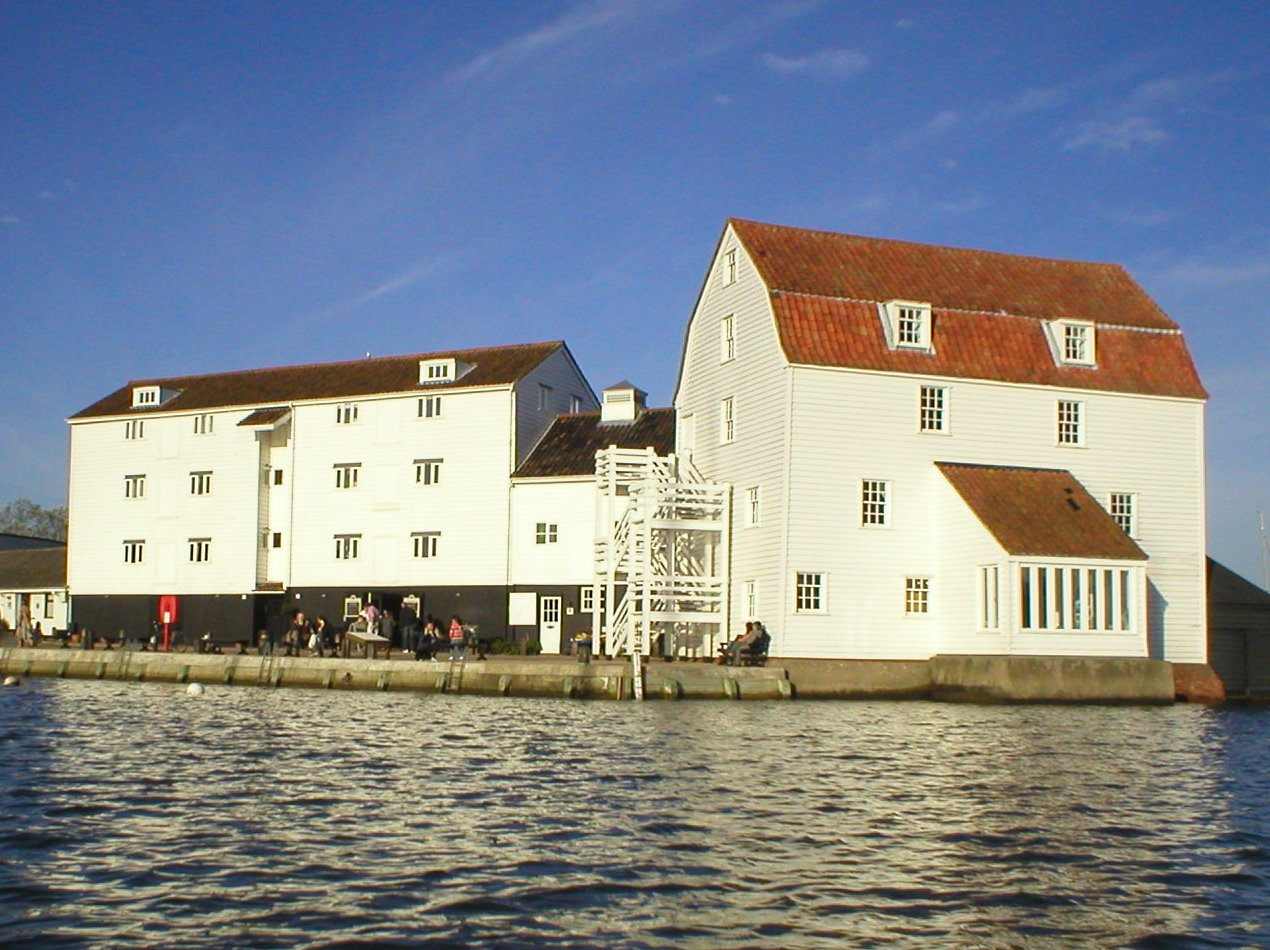
Woodbridge Tide Mill

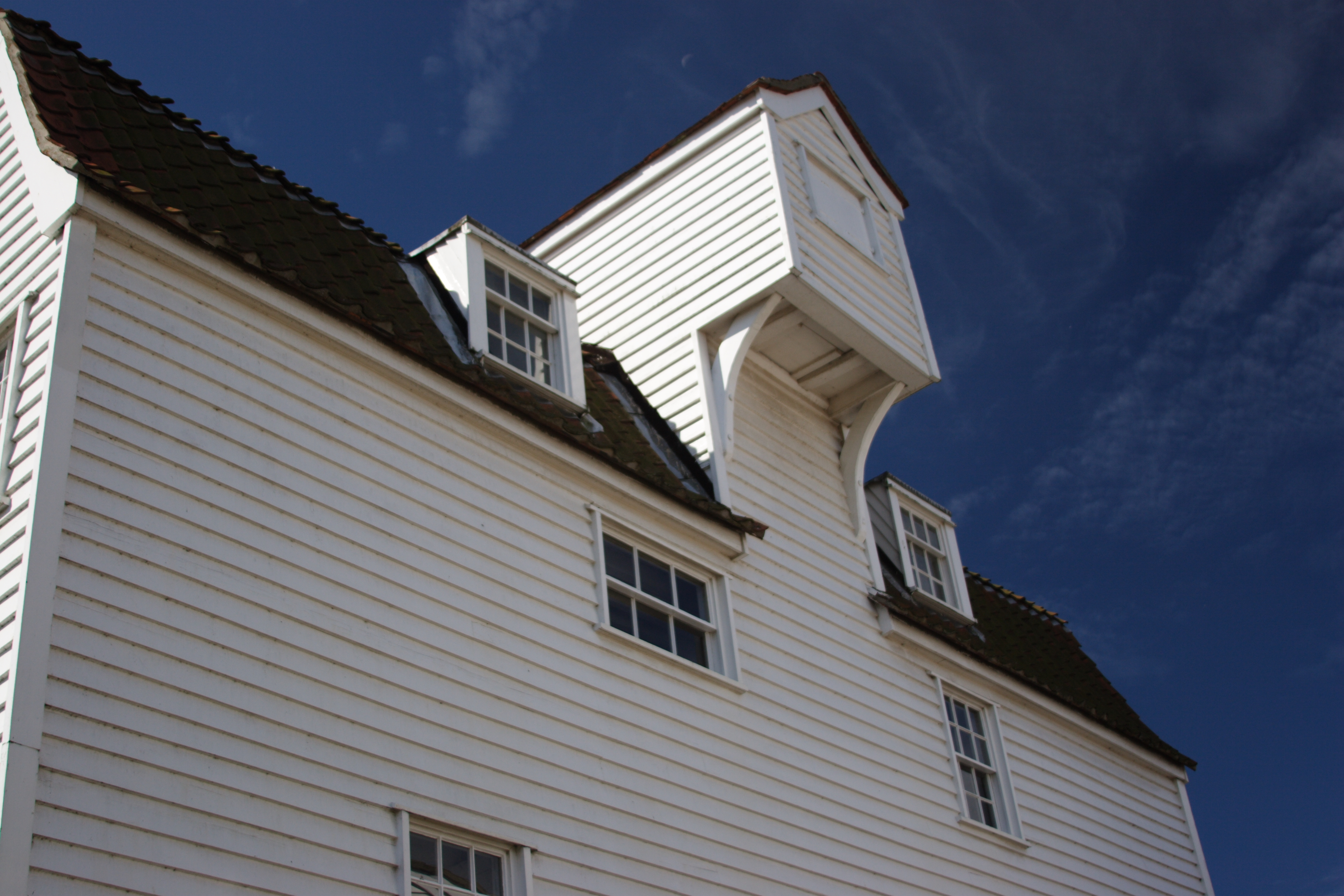
detail of The Tide Mill

Woodbridge Tide Mill in Woodbridge, Suffolk, England is a rare example of a tide mill whose water wheel still turns and is capable of grinding a wholemeal flour.

The mill is a Grade I listed building. It is a three-storey building constructed from wood; externally it is clad in white Suffolk boarding and has a Gambrel roof. Its machinery reflects the skills and achievements of the early Industrial Revolution. It has been preserved and is open to the public. The reservoir constructed for demonstration purposes is roughly half an acre in extent, the original 7-acre (28,000 m^{2}) one is now a marina.

== History ==
Interior of the Tide Mill

The first recording of a tide mill on this site was a medieval mill in 1170; it is unknown how many mills have stood here, but probably three. The mill, which was operated by the local Augustinian priory in the Middle Ages, was acquired by Henry VIII during the Dissolution of the Monasteries in 1536. It is possible that the Augustinians rebuilt the mill shortly before the dissolution. This mill and the former Woodbridge Priory was granted to Thomas Seckford by Elizabeth I. That mill passed through the hands of various private owners until it was rebuilt in the seventeenth century. This is the mill preserved today.

By the outbreak of World War II the mill was one of only a handful still operating. In 1957 it closed as the last commercially operating tide mill in Britain. In 1968 the derelict mill was purchased by Mrs Jean Gardner and a restoration programme was launched. It was opened to the public five years later in 1973. It is now managed by a charitable trust (Woodbridge Tide Mill Trust) staffed by volunteers, and in 2011 the trust undertook a further and more complete restoration and modernisation project, including a new water wheel and fully restored machinery, which allowed milling to begin again. It re-opened in 2012 and is now the only tide mill in the UK that can regularly grind wheat grain producing wholemeal flour for resale, since the Eling Tide Mill in Hampshire is currently suffering a maintenance issue.

== See also ==
- Watermills in the United Kingdom
- Eling Tide Mill

Other mills in, or strongly connected with Woodbridge:-

- Buttrum's Mill, Woodbridge
- Tricker's Mill, Woodbridge
- Ramsey Windmill, Essex
