= Daniels Mill, Shropshire =

Coordinates: 52.5206°N 2.4160°W

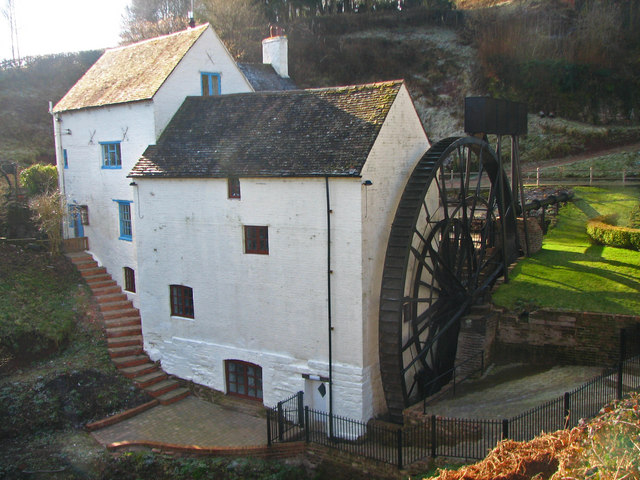

Daniels Mill is a working water mill used for milling flour, located near Bridgnorth in the English county of Shropshire. The mill has the largest cast iron waterwheel in England, spanning a 38 feet (12 m) diameter.

The present mill worked until 1957 grinding a variety of grain for animal feed, but ceased operation upon the death of the miller, who was the present owner's father. After a great deal of restoration work, the mill was re-opened in 2008.

== History ==
The mill stands below the Oldbury Viaduct of the Severn Valley Railway which runs close by.

The earliest reference to the mill and its surrounding land appears around the late 15th century, when it was known as "Donynges" or "Dunnings" Mill. The property was originally part of the Pitchford estate of the Ottley family, who owned much of the land in Bridgnorth and surrounding parishes. The mill remained in the hands of the Pitchford estate until the 18th century. In the early centuries the mill was probably worked by an itinerant journeyman miller – someone who would visit the mill only when there was work to be done.

The mill has been enlarged and altered several times. The original structure would have had no resemblance to the present building. Originally it would have been a low structure with two floors and extending parallel to the present wheel. It is probable that the old wheel would have been constructed of wood instead of iron, been much smaller than the present wheel, and would have been located on the opposite end of the building. The entrance where corn was delivered also was likely in another location.

The earliest known resident millers, the Crowther family, enlarged the mill and likely built proper living accommodation at that time, though the mill could have also been enlarged prior to their involvement. It is likely the first enlargement would have taken place around the early 17th century, when land was obtained to construct the upper pool. When this pool was made, a small mill was built under its dam. This smaller mill was known locally as the "mill in the hole", or Clover Mill. All that remains of this smaller mill is the building's back wall and the wheel pit. The newest part of the building, the "L" extension, was the last addition and provided a kitchen, bedroom and attic/bedroom.

The present wheel was originally cast at Coalbrookdale in 1854, installed around the middle of the 19th century and replaced an earlier wheel on the same site. Documents show that as early as 1843 a steam engine had been purchased to work in conjunction with the present wheel.

Because of the lack of resources, little modernisation of the house had taken place since Victorian times. This state of affairs continued until 1946 when the miller and resident at that time, Henry Thomason, wired the house for electricity. Though the house had lights and power, Thomason refused to electrify the mill, saying it would be dangerous. When Thomason died in 1957, the mill sat unused for a time.

== Restoration ==
In 1958, the mill was restored. A tremendous amount of work went into the restoration, which included fixing water damage to the wheel, rebuilding several walls around the wheel pit, installing a new steel axle, replacing millstones and their timber framework, replacing floorboards, windows and more. Great care was taken to use old materials, mostly obtained from demolition sites.

In 2007 the mill was awarded a £67,500 grant from GrantScape Community Heritage Fund to reinstate the secondary water feed to the wheel – this involved reinstating both a large feed pool and underground pipe, and the reconstruction of the overwheel water tank which had been removed in the mid 1960s when it became unsafe.

While this work was being planned the mill was badly damaged by serious flooding during the summer of 2007. A grant from the Shropshire Tourism Action Plan programme for European Rural Development Funds was obtained to upgrade the site and improve visitor access. Other funding from the Society for the Protection of Ancient Buildings, Bridgnorth District Council and the Midlands Mills Group, along with money raised through a public appeal, helped restore the wheel and workings so three sets of millstones could turn once again. The culmination of these three projects was marked by a re-opening in July 2008.

During 2008 work to uncover the ruin of the smaller mill was also carried out. Fragments of mill stones, one large English mill stone, and evidence of an even older water wheel were exposed during the excavations.

== See also ==
- Listed buildings in Eardington
