= Eling Tide Mill =

Tide mill in Eling, Hampshire, England

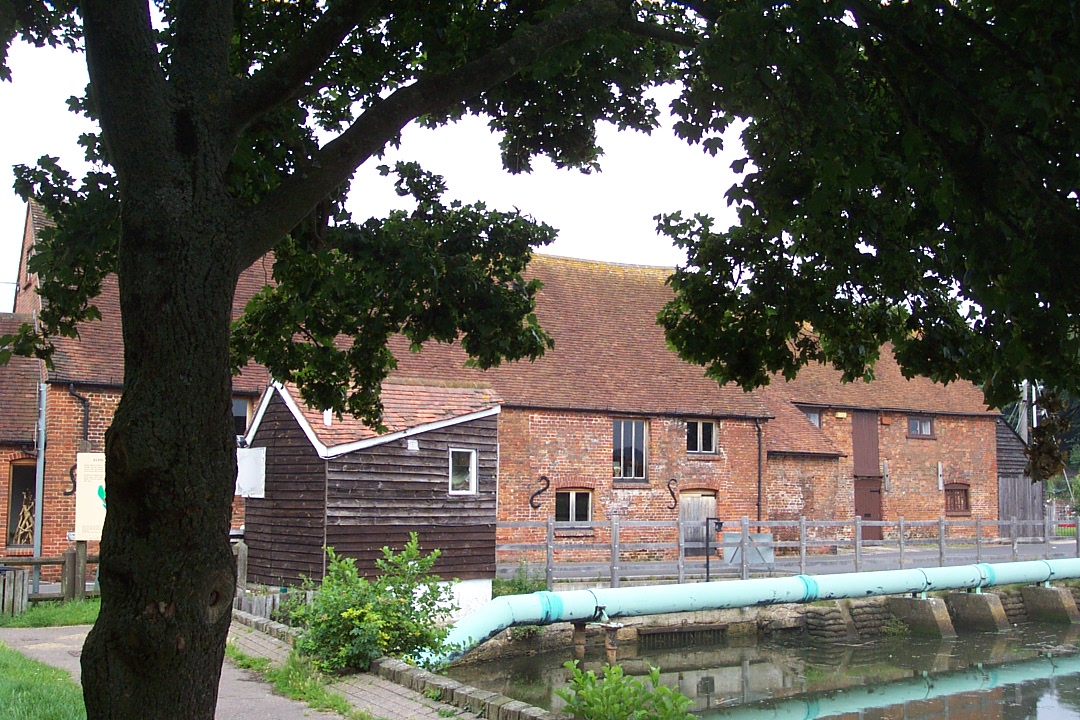
- The mill from beside mill pond, with the toll hut foreground.

- Location within Hampshire
- 50°54′40″N 1°28′56″W
- Location: Eling
- OS grid reference: SU 36502 12520

History
- Built: ca 1785

Site notes
- Area: Hampshire
- Owner: New Forest District Council

Listed Building – Grade II*
- Official name: Tide Mill
- Designated: 29 March 1959
- Reference no.: 1179062

Eling Tide Mill, situated on an artificial causeway in Eling in Hampshire, England, is one of only two remaining operating tide mills in the United Kingdom. The other is Woodbridge Tide Mill in Suffolk. Whilst a mill is mentioned in the Domesday Book of 1086, there is no evidence that there is any connection to the present mill. The current mill was rebuilt roughly two hundred years ago after storm damage in the 1770s. Eling Tide Mill is the focal point of The Eling Tide Mill Experience, created in 2009 as The Eling Experience when the tide mill, nearby Totton & Eling Heritage Centre, and the outdoor walks at Goatee Beach and Bartley Water came under the same management and marketing. The site adopted the current name in 2018 when it reopened after a 3-year refurbishment project largely funded by the Lottery Fund. It is a Grade II* listed building.

== Operation ==
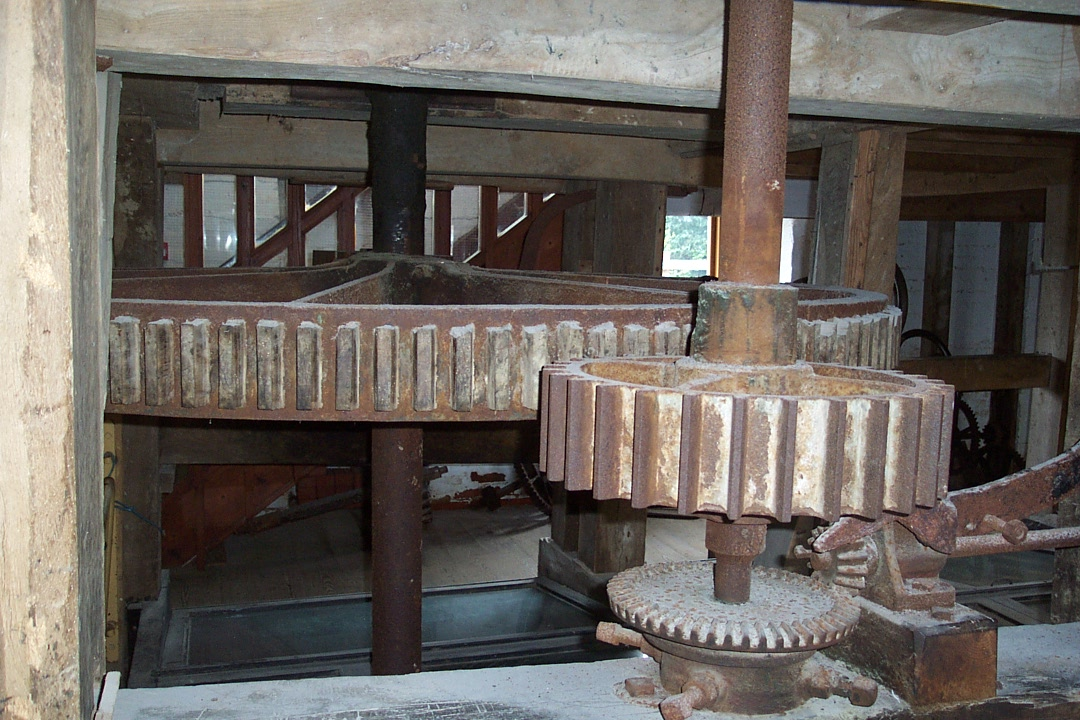
Detail of Eling's unrestored static exhibit

The tide mill has a pair of independent waterwheels designed to drive two sets of millstones each. One wheel and its associated millstones have been restored to operating condition and produces flour for sale. The other has been cosmetically restored as a static exhibit. The running wheel and its milling and other mechanisms are encased for safety of the miller and visitors, while the static wheel is immobile and kept that way to show visitors the detail that is obscured by the running mechanism's safety enclosures. The mill can be productive for between five and seven hours each day.

== History ==
For much of the mill's life it was owned by Winchester College. A lease survives from the year 1418, when the College leased the mill to Thomas Mydlington, requiring him to maintain the mill and the causeway. The causeway was prone to collapse, for example it washed away in 1887. This problem continued up until 1940 when modern engineering calculations revealed the cause to be the design of the sluices. This was then corrected.

The tenancy of the mill included the right to collect tolls from vehicles using the causeway. Four-wheeled vehicles were charged 6d (2.5p) and two-wheeled vehicles 4d. These rates remained unchanged until 1970. More recently, the toll has been administered by Totton and Eling Town Council, and is charged at £1.00 per day for motorcycles and £2.00 per day for cars and vans.

In 1967, the toll collector was Tom Mackrell who had been one of the last people to operate the mill when it closed in 1946. Tom was toll collector and mill foreman, working for his brother Raymond, master miller of Eling Tide Mill.

In 1975 the mill was sold to New Forest District Council by Winchester College for a nominal sum. It then underwent restoration before reopening in 1980 and is now run as the "Eling Tide Mill Experience."
