= Ramsey Windmill, Essex =

Windmill in Ramsey, Essex, England

Ramsey Mill
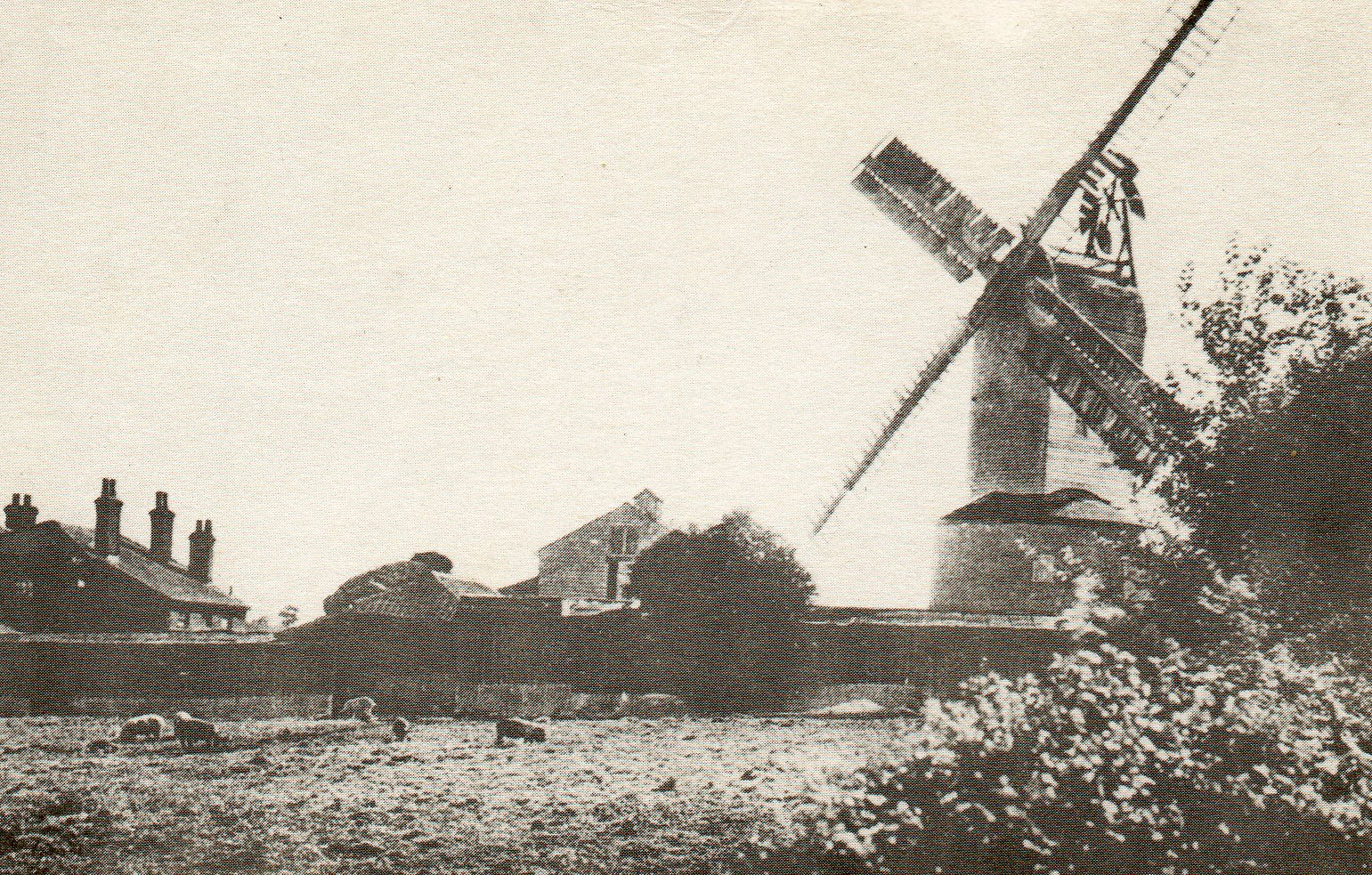
- The mill in working order, c1920

Origin
- Mill name: Ramsey Mill
- Mill location: TM 209 304
- Coordinates: 51°55′44″N 1°12′47″E
- Operator(s): Private
- Year built: 1842

Information
- Purpose: Corn mill
- Type: Post mill
- Storeys: Three storeys
- Roundhouse storeys: Three storey roundhouse
- No. of sails: Four sails
- Type of sails: Double Patent sails
- Windshaft: Cast iron
- Winding: Fantail
- Fantail blades: Six blades
- No. of pairs of millstones: Three pairs
- Other information: Moved from Woodbridge, Suffolk

Ramsey Windmill is a grade II* listed post mill at Ramsey, Essex, England which has been restored.

== History ==
Ramsey Windmill was originally built in Woodbridge, Suffolk. It was the north westerly one of four mills on the Mill Hills shown on the 1838 tithe map. The mill was moved to Ramsey in 1842 by Henry Collins, millwright of Woodbridge. The mill was working until the Second World War, and then left to deteriorate until 1974 when the owner, Mr Michael Organ, set about restoring the mill. Members of the Suffolk Mills Group assisted with work on Ramsey Windmill between 1974 and 1978.

== Description ==
Ramsey Windmill is a post mill with a three-storey roundhouse. The mill was winded by a roof mounted fantail, similar to that seen at Icklesham today. It has four double Patent sails. There are two pairs of millstones in the breast and a third pair in the tail.

=== Trestle and roundhouse ===
The trestle is of oak. The main post is 17 feet 6 inches (5.33 m) in length, 27 inches (686 mm) square at its base. The mill was built with a roundhouse from the start. Having started life in Suffolk, and being moved by a Suffolk millwright, the normal practice from that county was followed, with the roundhouse having three storeys.

=== Body ===
The body of the mill measures 16 feet (4.88 m) by 10 feet 4 inches (3.15 m) in plan. The mill is 48 feet 6 inches (14.78 m) high overall. The Crowntree is 22 1/2 inches (570 mm) square in section. The side girts are 9 inches (229 mm) by 14 inches (356 mm) in section.

=== Sails and Windshaft ===
Ramsey Mill has a cast iron windshaft and four double Patent sails.

=== Machinery ===
The wooden Head Wheel is of clasp arm construction, 7 feet 3 inches (2.21 m) diameter, with 90 cogs of 3 inches (76 mm) pitch. It drives two pairs of overdrift French Burr millstones via a cast-iron Wallower and Spur Wheel. The cast-iron Tail Wheel is 4 feet (1.22 m) diameter. It drives a single pair of underdrift 3 feet 4 inches (1.02 m) diameter millstones via an Upright Shaft and Spur wheel.

=== Fantail ===
Ramsey Windmill was winded by a six-bladed roof-mounted fantail, which blew off in 1939. The drive was down the back of the mill and thence to a ring set above the join of the quarterbars to the main post.

== Millers ==
- Robert Brooks 1842 - 1870
- Robert Brooks Jr 1870 -
- John Brooks 1887 -
- L Lungley - 1937
- R M Scott 1939
- Lee Buchan 2013

References for above:-
