= Wangford Rural District =

Former rural district in East Suffolk, England

Coordinates: 52.43°N 1.47°E

Wangford
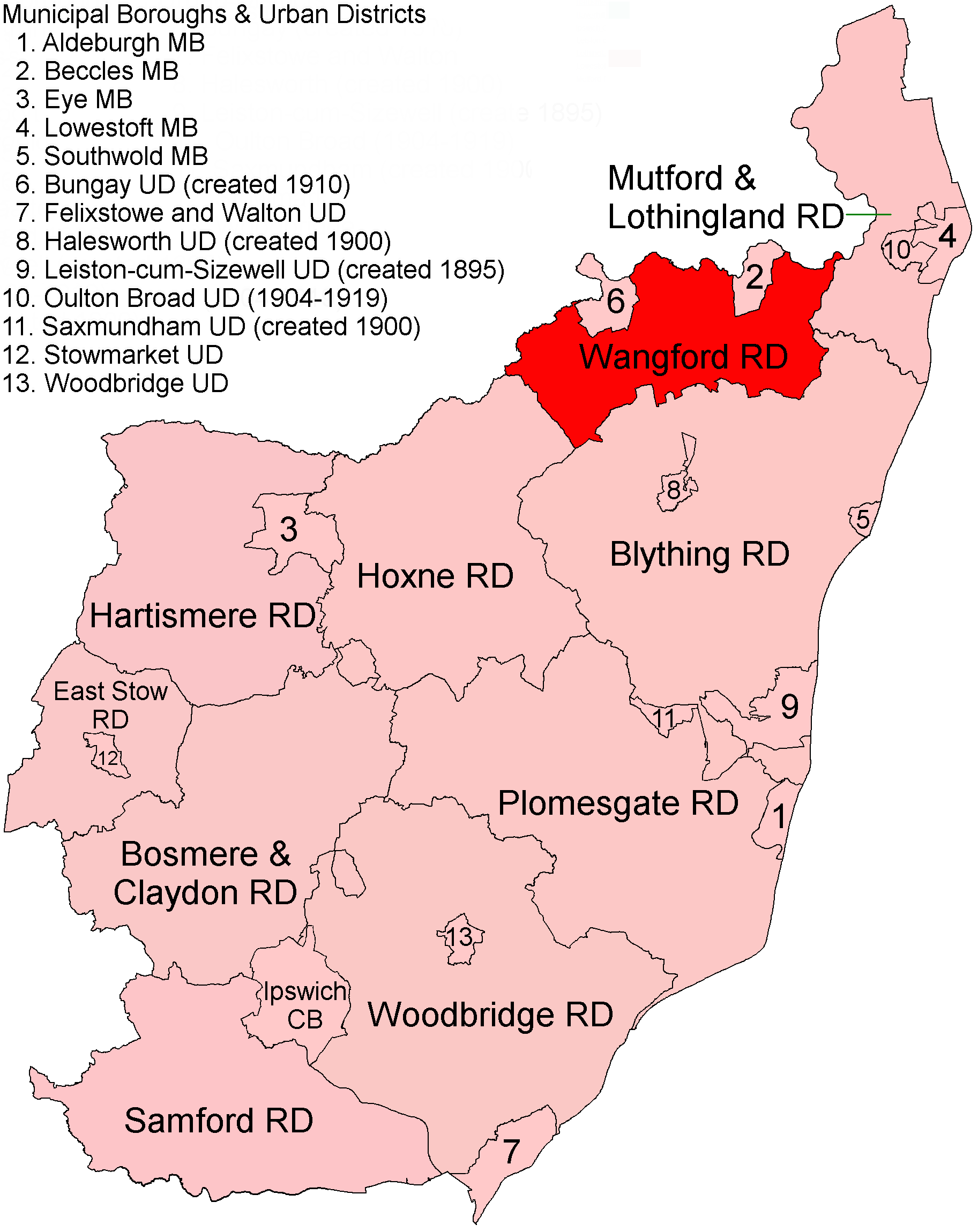
- Location within East Suffolk, 1894
- History
  - Created: 1894
  - Abolished: 1934
  - Succeeded by: Wainford Rural District
- Status: Rural district

Wangford Rural District was a rural district within the administrative county of East Suffolk between 1894 and 1934. It was created out of the earlier Wangford rural sanitary district. It was named after the historic hundred of Wangford, whose boundaries it closely matched. It contained the group of small villages collectively known as The Saints.

In 1910 a new urban district of Bungay was created out of a part of the northern side of the district.

In 1934, under a County Review Order, Wangford Rural District was abolished and its parishes transferred to the new Wainford Rural District. In 1974 the area became part of Waveney district.

== Statistics ==
Year	Area		Population	Density (pop/ha)
Year	acres	ha	Population	Density (pop/ha)
1911	30,910	12,509	4,820	0.39
1921	30,910	12,509	4,605	0.37
1931	30,910	12,509	4,338	0.35

== Parishes ==
Wangford RD contained the parishes of Bungay Holy Trinity and Bungay St Mary (until 1910); Barsham, Ellough, Flixton, Homersfield, Ilketshall (St Andrew, St John, St Lawrence & St Margaret), Mettingham, North Cove, Redisham, Ringsfield, Shadingfield, Shipmeadow, Sotterley, South Elmham (All Saints and St Nicholas, St Cross, St James, St Margaret, St Michael & St Peter), Weston, Willingham St Mary and Worlingham.
