= Central and Eastern Suffolk =

- Proposed unitary authority area
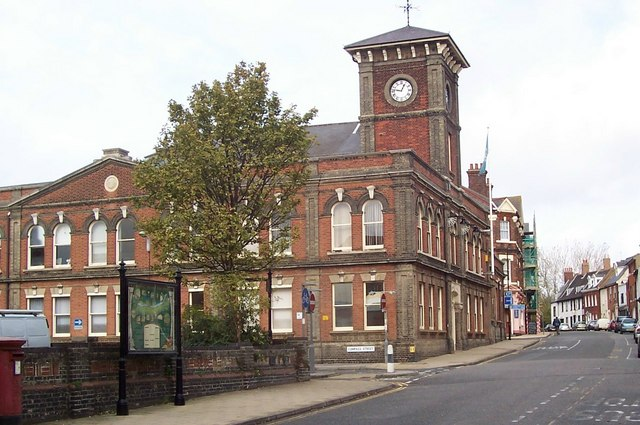
- Lowestoft

- Central and Eastern Suffolk shown within Suffolk
- Interactive map
- Coordinates: 52.4831°N 1.7559°E
- Sovereign state: United Kingdom
- Country: England
- Region: East
- Ceremonial county: Suffolk

Government
  - Type: Unitary authority
  - Body: Central and Eastern Suffolk Council

Area
  - Total: 703.2 sq mi (1,821.3 km^{2})

Population (2024 estimate)
  - Total: 260,532
- Time zone: UTC+0 (GMT)
  - Summer (DST): UTC+1 (BST)

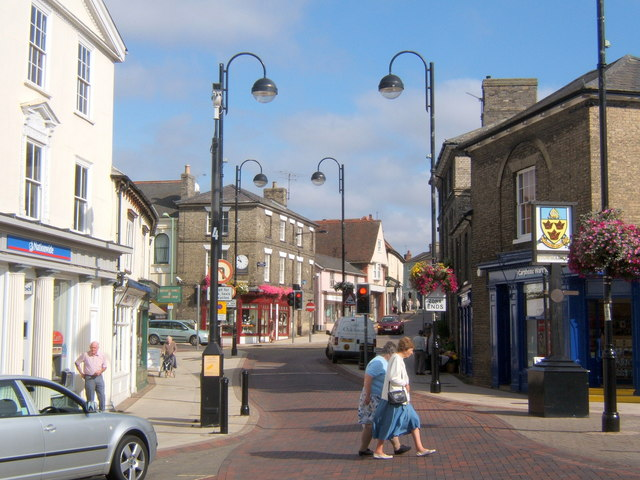
Stowmarket

Central and Eastern Suffolk or Central and East Suffolk was a proposed unitary authority area in the ceremonial county of Suffolk, England. It would have been formed from the Mid Suffolk district less 29 parishes and East Suffolk less 25 parishes. There would have been elections in May 2027 and the new unitary would have been created in 2028. In 2021 the population of the area was 253,416. Plans to create it were withdrawn in September 2026.

== Formation ==
It was being formed as part of ongoing local government changes throughout England, in which all areas of the country that have separate county councils and district councils will see those replaced with single-tier, or unitary, local governance.

The other new unitary authorities in Suffolk would have been Western Suffolk and Ipswich and South Suffolk. The alternative proposal for a single unitary council for Suffolk, which was put forward by Suffolk County Council, was not chosen.

In September 2026, the Suffolk proposals were withdrawn by the government in light of new legal advice. The decision was threatened with judicial review by Suffolk County Council.

== Parishes and settlements ==
The largest settlement in the district would have been Lowestoft, the whole of the area is currently parished. It would have contained the following civil parishes:

- Aldeburgh, Alderton, Aldringham cum Thorpe, All Saints and St Nicholas, South Elmham, Ashbocking, Ashfield cum Thorpe, Aspall, Athelington
- Bacton, Badingham, Badley, Barking, Barnby, Barsham, Battisford, Bawdsey, Baylham, Beccles, Bedfield, Bedingfield, Benacre, Benhall, Blaxhall, Blundeston, Blyford, Blythburgh, Boulge, Boyton, Braiseworth, Bramfield, Brampton with Stoven, Brandeston, Bredfield, Brome and Oakley, Bromeswell, Bruisyard, Brundish, Bungay, Burgate, Burgh, Butley, Buxhall
- Campsey Ash, Capel St Andrew, Carlton Colville, Charsfield, Chediston, Chillesford, Clopton, Coddenham, Combs, Cookley, Corton, Cotton, Covehithe, Cransford, Cratfield, Creeting St Mary, Creeting St Peter, Cretingham, Crowfield, Culpho
- Dallinghoo, Darsham, Debach, Debenham, Denham, Mid Suffolk, Dennington, Dunwich
- Earl Soham, Easton, Ellough, Eye, Eyke
- Farnham, Finningham, Flixton, Lothingland, Flixton, The Saints, Framlingham, Framsden, Fressingfield, Friston, Frostenden
- Gedgrave, Gipping, Gisleham, Gislingham, Gosbeck, Great Bricett, Great Finborough, Great Glemham, Grundisburgh
- Hacheston, Halesworth, Harleston, Hasketon, Haughley, Helmingham, Hemingstone, Henstead with Hulver Street, Hevingham, Hollesley, Holton, Hoo, Horham, Hoxne, Huntingfield
- Iken, Ilketshall St Andrew, Ilketshall St John, Ilketshall St Lawrence, Ilketshall St Margaret,
- Kelsale cum Carlton, Kenton, Kessingland, Kettleburgh, Knodishall
- Laxfield, Leiston, Letheringham, Linstead Magna, Linstead Parva, Little Finborough, Little Glemham, Lound, Lowestoft
- Marlesford, Mellis, Melton, Mendham, Mendlesham, Metfield, Mettingham, Mickfield, Middleton, Monewden, Monk Soham, Mutford
- Needham Market, Nettlestead, North Cove
- Occold, Offton, Old Newton with Dagworth, Onehouse, Orford, Otley, Oulton
- Palgrave, Parham, Peasenhall, Pettaugh, Pettistree
- Ramsholt, Rattlesden, Redisham, Redlingfield, Rendham, Rendlesham, Reydon, Ringsfield, Ringshall, Rishangles, Rumburgh, Rushmere
- Saxmundham, Saxtead, Shadingfield, Shelland, Shipmeadow, Shottisham, Sibton, Snape, Somerleyton, Ashby and Herringfleet, Somersham, Sotherton, Sotterley, South Cove, Southolt, Southwold, Spexhall, St Cross South Elmham, St James South Elmham, St Margaret South Elmham, St Mary South Elmham Otherwise Homersfield, St Michael South Elmham, St Peter South Elmham, Sternfield, Stoke Ash, Stonham Aspal, Stonham Earl, Stonham Parva, Stowmarket, Stowupland, Stradbroke, Stratford St Andrew, Stuston, Sudbourne, Sutton, Sweffling, Syleham
- Tannington, Theberton, Thorington, Thorndon, Thornham Magna, Thornham Parva, Thrandeston, Thwaite, Tunstall
- Ubbeston, Ufford, Uggeshall
- Walberswick, Walpole, Wangford with Henham, Wantisden, Wenhaston with Mells Hamlet, Westhall, Westhorpe, Westleton, Weston, Wetherden, Wetheringsett-cum-Brockford, Weybread, Wickham Market, Wickham Skeith, Wilby, Willingham St Mary, Willisham, Wingfield, Winston, Wissett, Woodbridge, Worlingham, Worlingworth, Wortham, Wrentham, Wyverstone
- Yaxley, Yoxford

== Governance ==
The local authority would have been Central and Eastern Suffolk Council. The first councillors would have been elected in May 2027. This election was cancelled in September 2026.
