= Waveney District =

Former non-metropolitan district in England

Coordinates: 52.4831°N 1.7561°E

- Non-metropolitan district
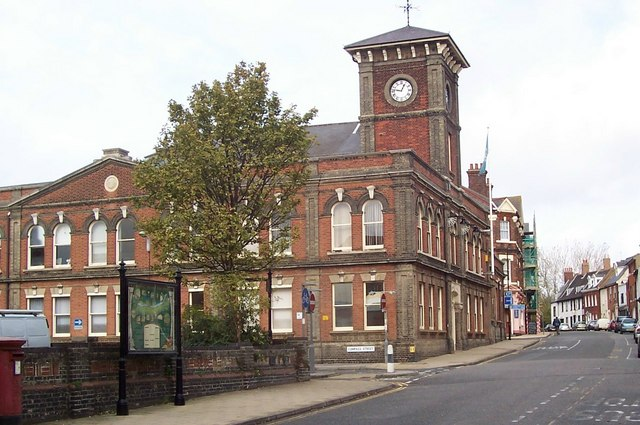
- Lowestoft Town Hall, the district headquarters.

- Waveney shown within Suffolk and England
- Sovereign state: United Kingdom
- Constituent country: England
- Region: East of England
- Non-metropolitan county: Suffolk
- Status: Non-metropolitan district
- Admin HQ: Lowestoft
- Established: 1 April 1974
- Merged: 31 March 2019

Government
  - Type: Non-metropolitan district council
  - Body: Waveney District Council
  - Leadership: Leader & Cabinet ( )

Area
  - Total: 143.0 sq mi (370.4 km^{2})

Population (2018)
  - Total: 117,900
  - Density: 824.4/sq mi (318.3/km^{2})
  - Ethnicity: 98.8% White
- Time zone: UTC0 (GMT)
  - Summer (DST): UTC+1 (BST)
- ONS code: 42UH
- GSS code: E07000206
- OS grid reference: TM5500193916
- Website: www.waveney.gov.uk

Waveney was a local government district in Suffolk, England, named after the River Waveney that formed its north-east border. The district council was based in Lowestoft, the major settlement in Waveney. The other towns in the district were Beccles, Bungay, Halesworth and Southwold.

The district was formed on 1 April 1974, under the Local Government Act 1972, as a merger of the municipal boroughs of Beccles, Lowestoft and Southwold, along with Bungay and Halesworth urban districts, Wainford Rural District and part of Lothingland Rural District. The population of the district at the 2011 Census was 115,254. The last elections to the council were held on 7 May 2015, the second election after the council moved to a Whole Council election system, meaning all 48 council seats were contested. Before the 2011 elections the council was under Conservative Party control.

At the 2011 election the Conservatives had lost overall control, with both it and the Labour party represented by 23 councillors, the balance of the council being made up of one Green Party and one Independent councillor. A series of procedural moves led to the formation of a Conservative-led administration. At the 2015 election the Conservatives won an absolute majority, with 27 seats, with Labour winning 20 and the Green Party 1.

Waveney district was merged with Suffolk Coastal district on 1 April 2019 to form the new East Suffolk district.

== List of communities ==
There were 59 towns and civil parishes in Waveney:

- All Saints and St Nicholas, South Elmham
- Barnby
- Barsham
- Beccles (town)
- Benacre
- Blundeston
- Blyford
- Brampton with Stoven
- Bungay (town)
- Carlton Colville
- Corton
- Covehithe
- Ellough
- Flixton, Lothingland
- Flixton, The Saints
- Frostenden
- Gisleham
- Halesworth (town)
- Henstead with Hulver Street
- Holton
- Kessingland
- Lound
- Lowestoft (town)
- Mettingham
- Mutford
- North Cove
- Oulton
- Oulton Broad
- Redisham
- Reydon
- Ringsfield
- Rumburgh
- Rushmere
- Shadingfield
- Shipmeadow
- Somerleyton, Ashby and Herringfleet
- Sotherton
- Sotterley
- South Cove
- Southwold (town)
- Spexhall
- St Andrew, Ilketshall
- St Cross, South Elmham
- St James, South Elmham
- St John, Ilketshall
- St Lawrence, Ilketshall
- St Margaret, Ilketshall
- St Margaret, South Elmham
- St Mary, South Elmham
- St Michael, South Elmham
- St Peter, South Elmham
- Uggeshall
- Wangford with Henham
- Westhall
- Weston
- Willingham St Mary
- Wissett
- Worlingham
- Wrentham
