= Wangford Hundred =

Historical division of Suffolk, England

Coordinates: 52.4°N 1.45°E

Wangford Hundred

Wangford was a hundred of Suffolk, England, consisting of 34,679 acres (140.34 km^{2}).

Wangford Hundred was an area of around twelve miles (19 km) from west to east and five across. The River Waveney formed its northern border separating it from Norfolk. To the east lay Mutford and Lothingland Hundred, to the south Blything Hundred and to the west Hoxne Hundred.

It is a fertile district, particularly in the broad vale of the Waveney with its rich marshes for feeding cattle. On the south side of the vale the land becomes hilly with an agricultural region of predominantly loam soil. The towns of Bungay and Beccles are the largest settlements in the former hundred. The hundred also contained the thirteen parishes (Ilketshall, South Elmham, Flixton and Homersfield) collectively known as The Saints.

== Wainford ==
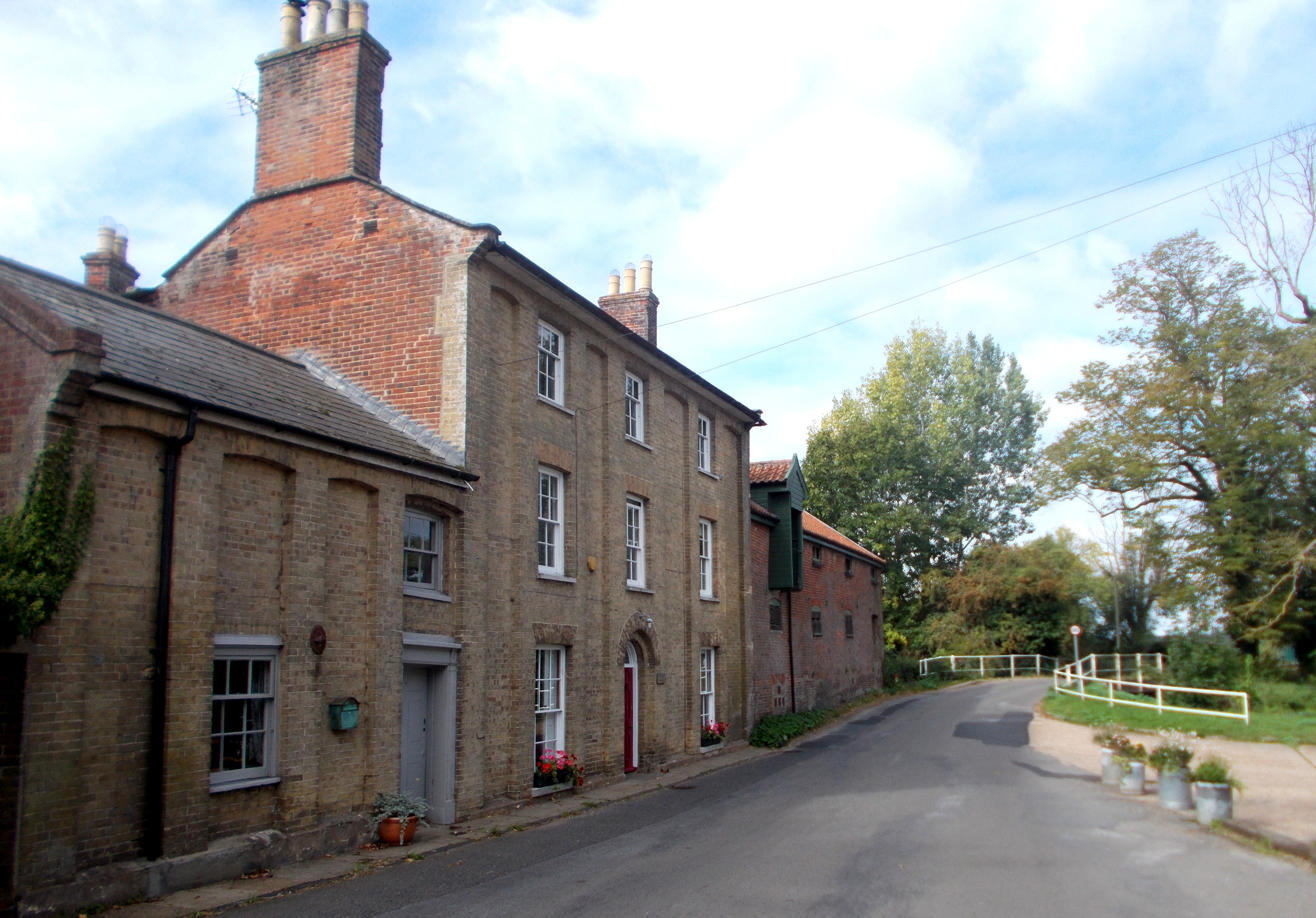
Wainford Mill, at the Domesday fording-place of the river Waveney, which gave its name to the Wangford Hundred

Listed as Wanneforda (inter alia) in the Domesday Book, the name is said by Walter Skeat to derive from an alternative name for the Waveney and thus to mean "ford across the Waveney". Eilert Ekwall, however, taking other early forms Wainforda, Weinforde and Weineford found in the 11th and 12th centuries, derived it (like Wangford in West Suffolk) from Old English wægn-ford, a ford that can be passed by a wagon or wain. In either case the ford appears to be identified with the site of Wainford Mill, just to the east of Bungay, which in 1491 occurs as Waynforth; these authorities consider that the Wangford Hundred takes its name from this Wainford. The name was also given to the Wainford Rural District which existed between 1934 and 1974.

Wainford is located immediately downstream of a weir on the Waveney, on the eastern side of the bow of the river which surrounds the town of Bungay, below which it flows through the rich level pastures eastwards towards Beccles. On the north bank is the parish of Ditchingham, the river meadows of which formed part of the ancient manor of Pirnhow. The road at Wainford crosses a succession of three bridges. A small old bridge on the south side of the mill crosses a narrow active channel possibly the leat; the bridge immediately north of the mill spanned the principal mill race; and the most northerly bridge crosses the main channel of the Waveney. The mill was active into the 20th century, when a large grain silo was built on the east side of the road. The ford was presumably in use before the full embankment of the river.

A total of 24 places with a population of around 1025 households are mentioned in the Domesday Book. It is not to be confused with the two other Wangfords in Suffolk.

== Parishes ==
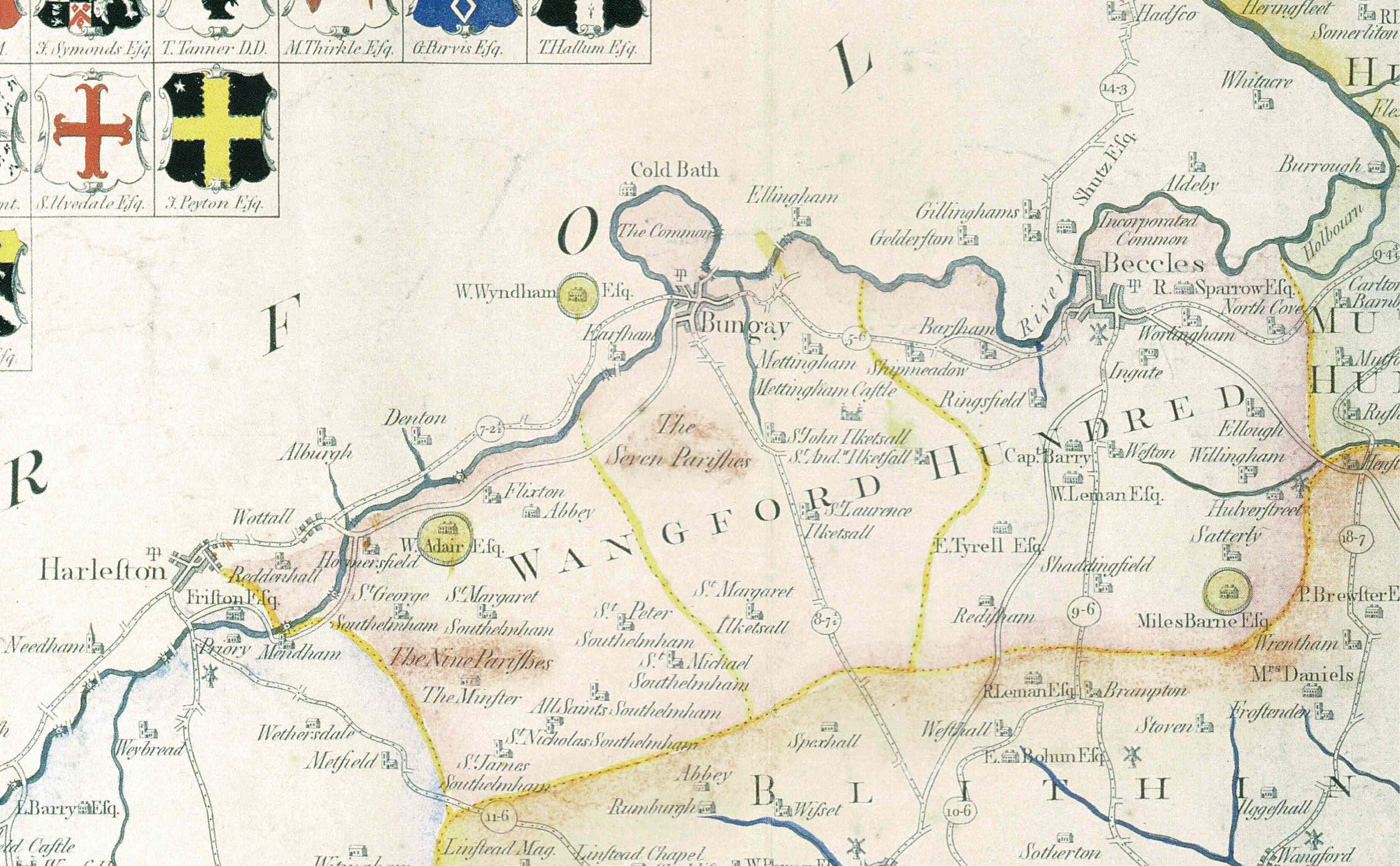
Wangford Hundred, (Kirby 1766)

Wangford Hundred consisted of the following 27 parishes:

| Parish | Area (acres) |
|---|---|
| Barsham | 1871 |
| Beccles | 1994 |
| Bungay | 2090 |
| Ellough | 1074 |
| Flixton | 1762 |
| Homersfield | 981 |
| Ilketshall St Andrew | 1696 |
| Ilketshall St John | 743 |
| Ilketshall St Lawrence | 988 |
| Ilketshall St Margaret | 2093 |
| Mettingham | 1706 |
| North Cove | 1082 |
| Redisham | 733 |
| Ringsfield | 1700 |
| Shadingfield | 1370 |
| Shipmeadow | 800 |
| Sotterley | 1594 |
| South Elmham, All Saints | 1150 |
| South Elmham, St Cross | 1301 |
| South Elmham, St James | 1302 |
| South Elmham, St Margaret | 589 |
| South Elmham, St Michael | 816 |
| South Elmham, St Nicholas | 500 |
| South Elmham, St Peter | 576 |
| Weston | 1551 |
| Willingham St Mary | 890 |
| Worlingham | 1727 |
