= Flixton Priory =

Former monastery in United Kingdom

Coordinates: 52.4262°N 1.4041°E

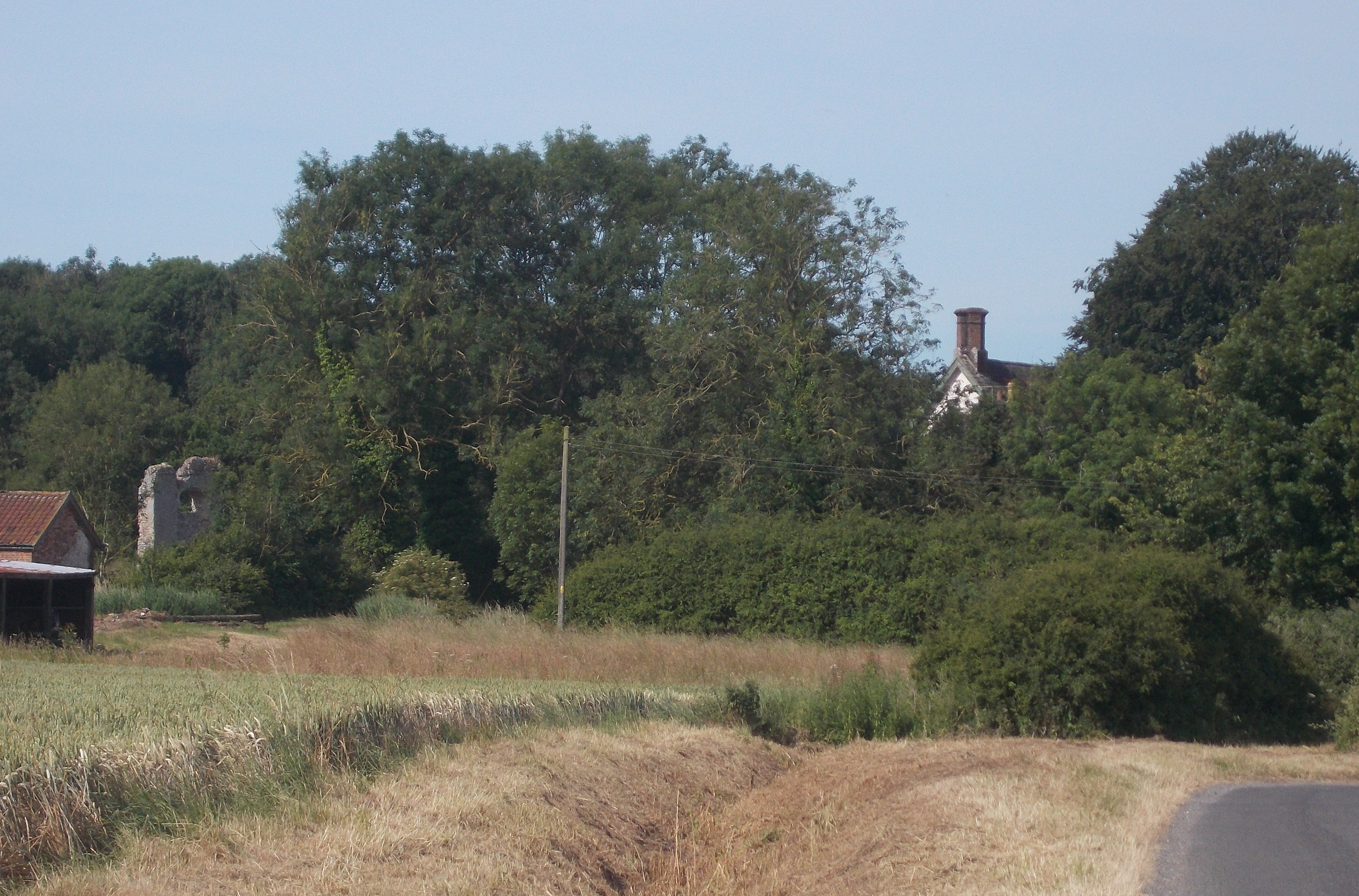
Flixton Abbey Farm from the north-east

Flixton Priory was a nunnery under a prioress following the Augustinian rule, which formerly stood in the parish of Flixton in the north of the English county of Suffolk, about 3 miles (4.8 km) south-west of Bungay. It was founded by Margery de Creke in 1258, and was dissolved in 1536–37. It was the poorest of the nunneries within the Diocese of Norwich. The site of the priory, which was enclosed by a moat, was at the present Abbey Farm, where little apart from the position in the landscape and a small section of standing wall remain to be seen. It was scheduled as an ancient monument in 1953. It is privately owned and is not open to the public. It is suggested that some parts of the masonry may have been re-used in St Peter's Hall at St Peter, South Elmham.

There are plentiful charters and other deeds and documents relating to the history of the priory. Eighty-four charters collected by Thomas Martin of Palgrave which were purchased by Thomas Astle entered the Stowe Collection, and passed from the Ashburnham Collection to the British Library. An 18th-century abstract of their contents is bound into the miscellaneous volume Stowe MS 1083, at fols. 56–84. Other Flixton charters owned by Thomas Astle are in the British Library "Carta Antiqua"; there is also a small but important series in the Lord Frederick Campbell collection. Several manorial rolls, rentals and other documents are among the Adair papers in the Suffolk Archives at Ipswich.

Flixton was among the feudal possessions of the Bishop of East Anglia at the time of the Domesday Book of 1086, and together with Homersfield "is embedded in the tight-knit bundle of estates and churches of the bishop's fee known as South Elmham." The claim thus laid by Norman Scarfe is that this historic endowment of the bishops originated in a 7th-century grant to the first East Anglian bishop, St Felix, Bishop of Dommoc c. 631–648, and that Flixton itself (and also the other Flixton, in Lothingland) take their names from him. While this does not decide the various claims of South Elmham in Suffolk and North Elmham in Norfolk to be the seat of the second East Anglian Episcopal see of Helmham established by Archbishop Theodore, it does provide a context which in the 13th century may have recommended Flixton as an appropriate site for a religious foundation, in a commanding manorial seat a short distance from the pre-Conquest parochial church.

== The patron family ==
Margery de Hanes (de Anos), daughter of Geoffrey de Hanes of Hillington, Norfolk, by her marriage to Bartholomew de Creke brought her inheritance to the principal heir of a house associated with the formerly rival powers of the Bigod and Glanvill families. The de Creke family were lords of the manor of Creak at North Creake, Norfolk, adjacent to the estate upon which Sir Robert de Nerford established a Hospital of St Bartholomew after 1217, which his widow Dame Alice developed as the Augustinian abbey of Creake.

Bartholomew de Creke, and his sisters Margaret and Isabel, were the children of Robert de Creke and his wife Agnes de Glanvill, daughter and heir of William, son of Hervey de Glanvill. Agnes had first married Thomas Bigod, son of Roger Bigod, 2nd Earl of Norfolk. Roger Bigod's father Hugh Bigod, 1st Earl of Norfolk (died 1177) made a second marriage to Gundreda, daughter of Roger de Beaumont, 2nd Earl of Warwick. This Countess, in her widowhood, married Roger de Glanvill, the uncle of Agnes, and with his assistance founded her nunnery at Bungay Priory. When Glanvill died, around 1195, certain Glanvill estates descended to Agnes as his heir, and Gundreda sued her for a share of them as her dower. At much the same time Thomas Bigod died and Agnes remarried to Robert de Creke. Roger de Glanvill's lands were, however, tied up in grants to Ranulf de Glanvill's monastery at Leiston Abbey, or else not disponible owing to Roger's debts to the crown.

Robert de Creke also held Glanvill lands at Combs, Suffolk, on behalf of the heirs of Agnes, but after 1210 paid his scutage and farm erratically, and made a second marriage. Not until 1221 was account rendered for Combs in Bartholomew's name. Bartholomew's sister Isabel married the heir of Theobald de Valoines, founder of Hickling Priory and of the nunnery at Campsey Priory, and in 1229 Bartholomew obtained the manor of Helmingham Hall (Creke Hall), Suffolk, from Theobald's sister Joan, prioress of Campsey, in exchange for rents out of his lands at Combs. His marriage to Margery de Hanes added her family manor of Hillington to their assets, and also that of Flixton. He settled a dower on his stepmother Richemaia on his return from service in Ireland in 1234. In 1240 £14 a year was owed to Bartholomew for Margery's maintenance out of the manors of Creake, Helmingham, Hillington and Flixton, payable at Fundenhall. These were held from him in part by William le Blund, whose sister was, before 1247, married to Bartholomew's cousin Robert de Valoines, son of Isabel de Creke.

== The foundation phase, 1256–1292 ==
=== Foundation charter ===
Bartholomew died around 1252 leaving three sons and a daughter, while Margery de Creke retained control of the manors which were hers by inheritance. She held the fee of Flixton from Robert, son of Sir Robert de Tateshal, on nominal service. In 1256 he granted her licence to found a house of religion there, at a site of her choosing, and granted her the fee to appropriate to the house. By charter of 1258 she gave the whole of her manor of Flixton, which she held by hereditary right, to the religious women professing the rule of St Augustine and certain other rules, serving God and St Mary and St Katharine and All Saints at her capital messuage in Flixton. The grant was made for the good of her own soul, for that of her father Geoffrey de Anos and mother, for her late husband Sir Bartholomew de Creke, for her children and other family. She did this with the full consent of her first-born son and heir Robert de Creke. Robert de Valoines and William le Blum (Blund) were two of the principal witnesses, and Margery's two younger sons Geoffrey and John de Creke also attested.

The monastery was limited to 18 nuns and a prioress, the first of whom was Alianora. The dwelling-house with its moated enclosure stood at the northern edge of the ancient cluster of parishes of South Elmham known as The Saints, on the brow of the plateau where it falls into the valley of the River Waveney. Two miles to the south stood the moated palace of the Bishops of Norwich at St Cross, South Elmham, built by Herbert de Losinga. That was a favourite residence of Bishop Walter Suffield (Calthorpe), who lived there in great splendour and died in May 1257. Margery's charter of foundation was therefore given under his successor Simon de Wanton, elected in June 1257 and consecrated in March 1258, who lived until 1266 and assisted Margery in her early benefactions. Bishop Roger Skerning later granted confirmation.

=== Early endowments ===
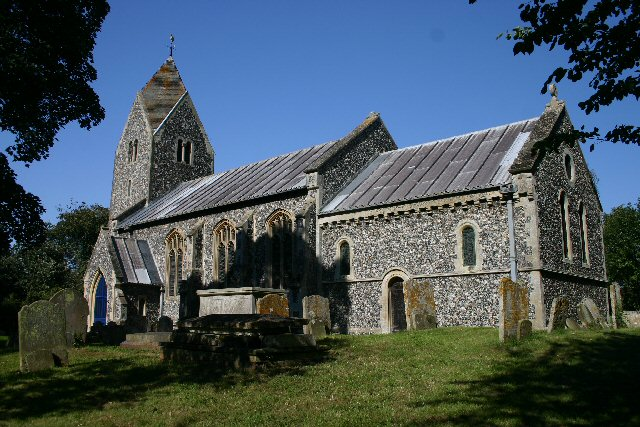
St Mary's church, Flixton, rebuilt by Anthony Salvin c. 1850

A short distance from the priory, at the foot of the lane, stood the parochial church of St Mary's, its large west tower of late Anglo-Saxon date topped by a Rhenish helm spire. The patronage of the church was held in two moieties, one belonging to the Bishop of Norwich and one to Margery de Creke. In 1260 Margery conveyed the messuage and two carucates of land, and her moiety of the advowson, to the priory, and Rannulf de Combs conveyed 20 acres of land at Flixton worth £1 a year. The advowson and appropriation of the church of Dunston, Norfolk, in 1264, and the advowson of Shipmeadow, Suffolk, in 1269, were conveyed to Prioress Beatrice (de Ratlesden), who had succeeded Alianora by 1263. At about this time the advowsons of North Creak and Helmingham also came to the priory.

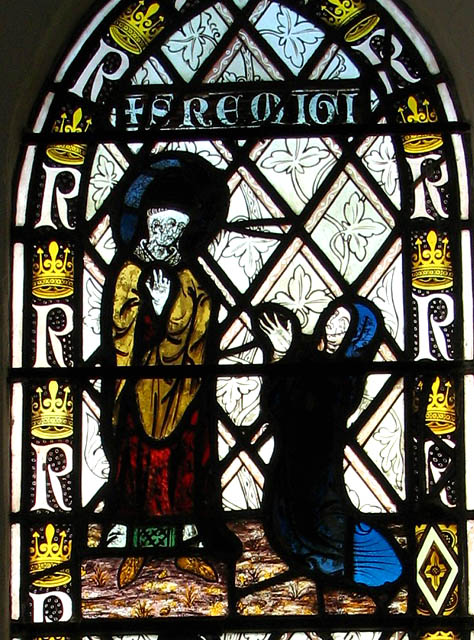
A patroness praying to St Remigius: Dunston, early 14th century

Margery outlived her two elder sons, who died without offspring: in 1272 she held Hillington and Westhorp from Robert de Tateshal. She gave a house and lands and the advowson of the church in Combs to the priory in c. 1275. In 1280, after petition, she granted the patronage of the priory to the Bishops of Norwich, then William de Middleton (1277–1288). She died about 1286, when the Combs lands, until then held in Bartholomew's name, passed to the third son, John de Creke. John lived only until 1289, leaving as heir his sister Sarra, wife of Roger fitz Peter fitz Osbert.

Successive escheats necessitated the renewal of the priory's endowments. In 1289 Prioress Beatrice conveyed her right of advowson of North Creak and Combs churches to Roger and Sarra, who in turn granted or regranted to her the manor of Flixton and moiety of the church, the advowson of Helmingham church (with land), a house with 26 acres in Wilby, Suffolk, a house with 29 acres in North Creak, and the advowsons of Dunston and Fundenhall, in pure alms. A grant of the watermill at Flixton and a mill at Combs was received from William de Colchester, and renewed in 1292 at Sarra's death, when an inquisition was held into the priory's temporalities, and an extent taken (counting only Dunston and the moiety of Flixton churches), showing a value of £43.18s.2d. See In the same year the priory granted a free chantry to Adam de Walpole in the chapel in his manor at Shipmeadow.

The church of Dunston is dedicated to St Remigius. It was much restored in the early 20th century. If the 14th-century glass in the chancel is original to this church, it may refer to the patronage of Flixton Priory in the image of a kneeling veiled woman, perhaps Margery de Creke herself, praying before the saint.

== Poverty and Reform, 1292–1357 ==
After Sarra's death, Roger fitz Peter held her lands by Courtesy of England until he died in 1306. All the estates of Sarra's inheritance were then divided between the heirs of Bartholomew de Creke's sisters. In this complicated partition, one moiety of all went to John de Thorp, great-grandson of Margaret de Creke, and the other moiety was subdivided between Rohesia and Cecily de Valoines, great-granddaughters of Isabel de Creke. (Cecily swapped her quarter of Creek for Rohesia's quarter of Combs and Helmingham.) The fee of Flixton was now held by the priory in frankalmoin in three parts, and the advowson of Helmingham church from Cecily (wife of Robert de Ufford, and mother of Robert de Ufford, 1st Earl of Suffolk). Emma de Welholm was admitted prioress in 1301 and occurs until 1328. In 1310, on the application of the King's leech, Master Robert de Cisterna, the priory was licensed to acquire lands to the value of £10 per annum, on account of their rents and possessions being insufficient for their sustenance.

Despite many small grants and plentiful lessees, the comparatively small endowment of the priory and the extinction of the principal line of its benefactors left it impoverished. In 1321 John Salmon, Bishop of Norwich and Lord Chancellor, exchanged with the priory his half of the advowson of Flixton church for that of Helmingham, uniting the two moieties and granting an appropriation. His deed of endowment refers to the notorious poverty of the house, and the patient devotion of the sisters. For a long time past, through unfortunate circumstances, they could not meet their own needs for food and drink, nor for the strangers or poor resorting to them; their possessions had grown barren, and would not cover half a year of their costs. They were now to have the tithes and proceeds of the church lands, and the manse and croft formerly assigned to the bishop's Rector: the Vicar, whose stipend should be found from the profits, was to occupy the priory's vicarage, and the priory became liable for repair of the chancel. A great benefit to the priory is implied.

Margery de Stonham succeeded as prioress, and at her death in 1345 Isabel Weltham was elected. Two years before this, William Bateman was consecrated Bishop of Norwich. His family was closely associated with Flixton, and bought much land there. At Easter 1331 Bartholomew Bateman, 'chivaler', brother of the bishop, acquired a manor at Flixton from Robert de Sandcroft, apparently that centred upon Flixton Hall, and, dying in 1349, was buried at Flixton Priory. The priory, however, was so oppressed by poverty that by February 1348 they were unable to pay their tithes to the king and other charges, and were granted a pardon for two years. A month later, at the request of Henry of Grosmont, 1st Duke of Lancaster, they were granted licence to appropriate the church of Fundenhall (of which they already held the advowson). It was represented that most of the inhabitants of Dunston, upon whom the priory depended for part of its maintenance, died in the Great Mortality, and the land was left untilled, so that the nuns were again unable to provide for their own sustenance.

Bishop Bateman (who founded Trinity Hall, Cambridge in 1350, and completed the foundation of Gonville Hall) was at that time concerned with the chantry which Maud of Lancaster (Henry's sister) was establishing at the Augustinian nunnery of Campsey Priory, and, in preparation for the removal of their college of five (male) chaplains to Bruisyard, in 1353–54 he drew up provisional statutes for their observance. In the same period, as patron of Flixton Priory, he drew up new statutes for "la meson de Dames de Flixtune" (in the Anglo-Norman language), by which they were thereafter to be governed. Bateman died early in 1355, and by 1357 Joan de Hemynhall had succeeded Isabel Weltham as prioress. He had effectively reformed the priory, which in 1359 was able to acquire in mortmain houses and lands in South Elmham and Flixton to the value of 46s.4d. yearly under an existing licence.

== The priory ==
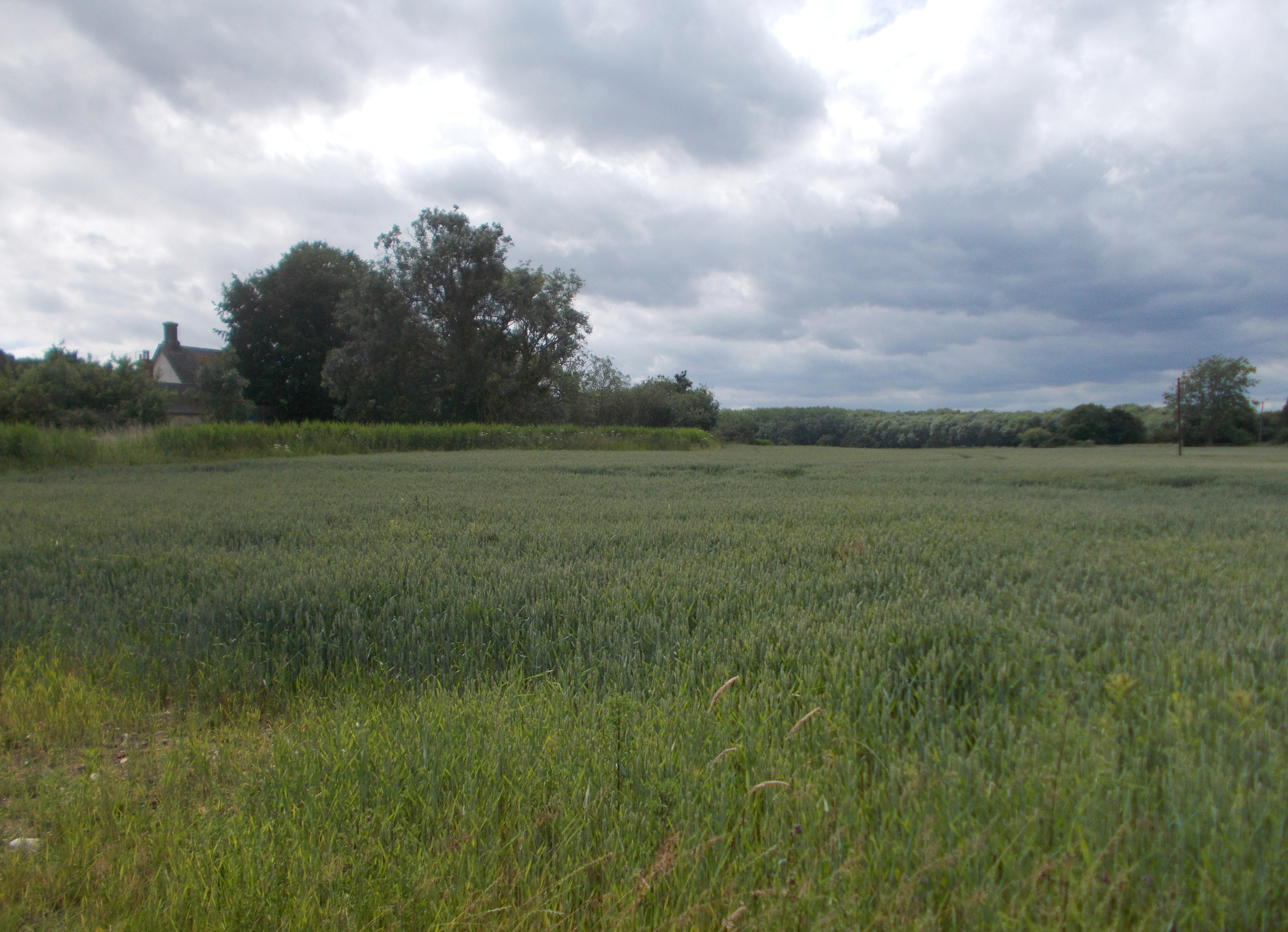
The north side of the moated priory site, overlooking the Waveney Valley to the west

=== The moated site ===
The moat surrounding the priory site is (very roughly) rectangular in layout. Its north side, facing the lane which rises from Flixton village, is the broadest section, between 15 and 20 metres across, and some 110 metres long. At the north-west corner, where there is a short outer spur, it turns firmly to the south for about 30 metres and there ends. From the north-east corner the channel (about 10 metres breadth) turns squarely southwards for about 140 metres, skirted by the farm track leading to Abbey Farm, before swinging round to the south-west (where the path forks) for about 100 metres, and then looping back to the north-west for about 35 metres. It ends with a baulk separating it from a small pond. Between this point and the terminal of the northern arm of the moat is a gap of about 72 metres, leaving the enclosure open on most of its west side. This may have been the priory entrance area. Within the southern arms of the moat is a pond about 35 metres long, with signs of another adjacent, fed by sluice from the moat: these are thought to be the priory fishpools.

=== The buildings ===
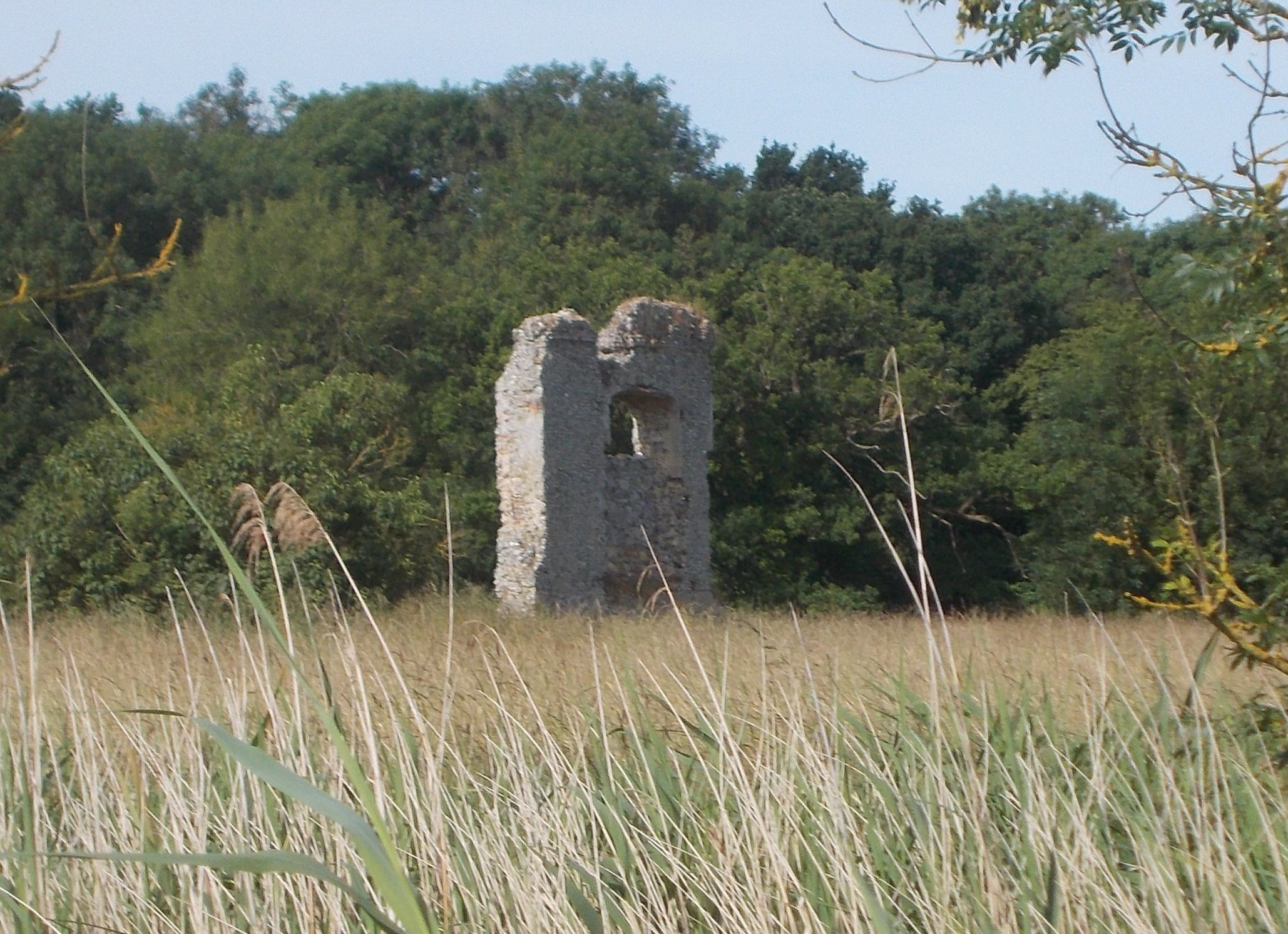
The standing ruin: part of the south wall of the priory south range

The priory buildings stood centrally within the moated precinct. The present farmhouse, aligned west and east, stands on or near the site of the priory church, and includes some rubble-built masonry with freestone quoins at its south-east corner. The cloister was on its south side, and the footings of the western range can be traced running north and south in line with the western end of the farmhouse. The position of the south range is shown both by its buried footings and from a central section of its outer (south) wall which still stands to full height with a single window opening. Although this window has a late, shallow arch, the surrounding masonry contains traces of arched windows of earlier type with stone tracery. This range was probably the nuns' refectory. The distance from this wall to the south wall of the farmhouse (comprising the width of the south range, the cloister, and possibly part of the church nave) is 37 yards. The features of the east range are less distinct.

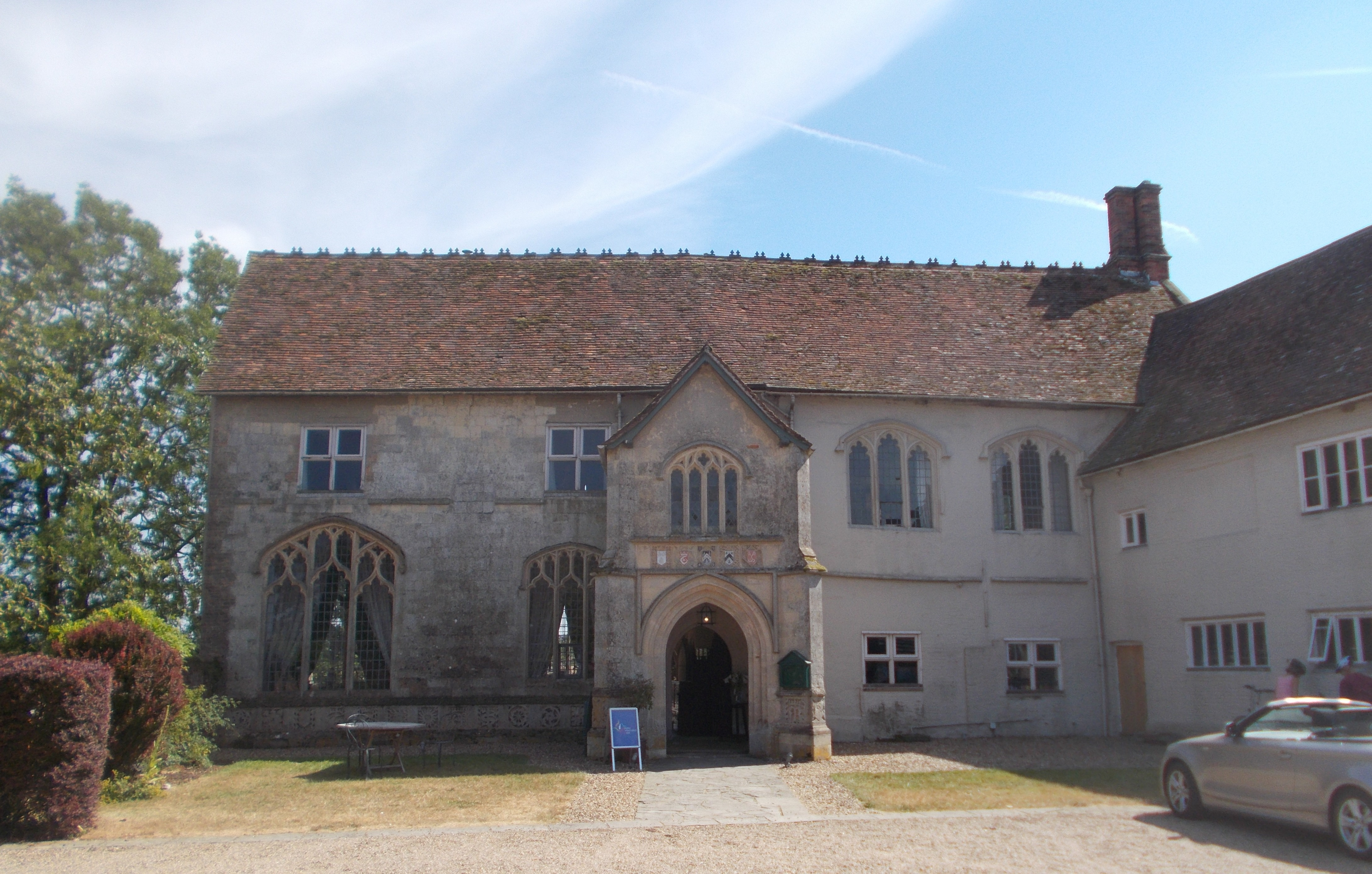
St Peter's Hall, South Elmham

It is thought possible that a quantity of architectural masonry including arched doorways, windows with stone mullion tracery, and a series of ornamental flint flushwork panels, were removed from Flixton Priory immediately after the Dissolution and incorporated into St Peter's Hall at St Peter, South Elmham, a seat of the Tasburgh family. It has long been doubted that these features are in their original setting. The suggested date of transfer is 1539, when a group of Norwich stonemasons worked on John Tasburgh's house at South Elmham, five years before he acquired the site of the priory manor. The window tracery is variously 14th- and 15th-century in style. If they did originate from Flixton, this would indicate important phases of building during that period at the priory.

=== The seal and coat of arms ===
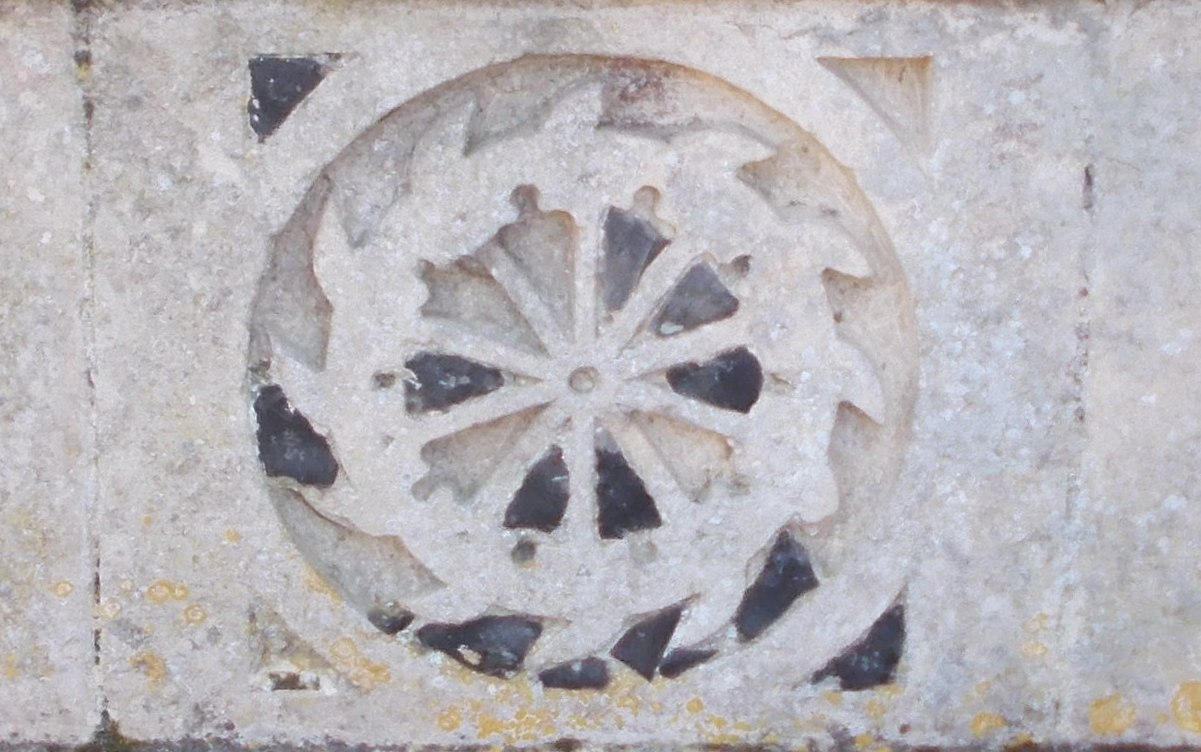
St Peter's Hall: St Catherine symbol

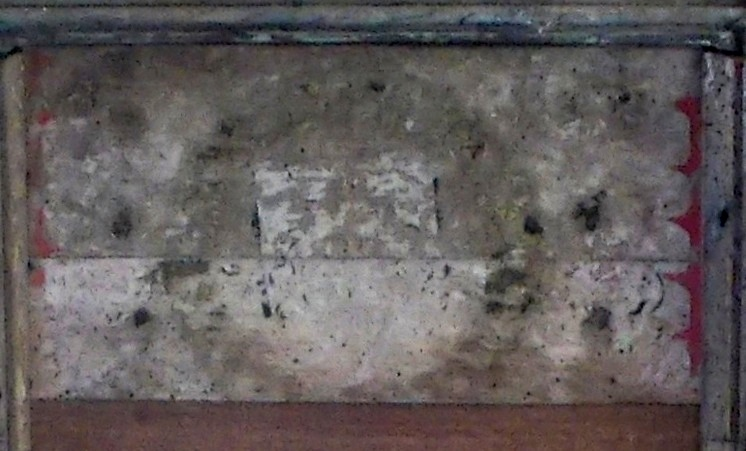
Fundenhall roodloft: the Flixton shield

Several charters in the Stowe collection carry impressions of the seal of the priory. This was lozenge-shaped, with a half-round lobe on each side each containing one of the four Evangelist symbols. The main field showed the Crucifixion with St Mary and St John standing at either side below, and the sun and moon above. At the bottom, beneath an arch, was an image of the Agnus Dei. This seal was in use during the 13th and 14th centuries. The seals of Flixton Priory and neighbouring Bungay Priory are together unique among seals of English nunneries in the depiction of the crucified Christ, a motif more generally associated with the male mendicant orders from the later 13th century.

The arms of the priory were "Azure, a St Catherine's wheel, with a Calvary cross projecting from it in chief, argent." This blazon, given by Richard Taylor in 1821, refers to these arms painted in one of the wooden panels of the medieval rood-loft of Fundenhall church; and notes that they were also painted in a similar position on the rood-loft of Flixton church. Taylor corrects Blomefield's statement that the field was gules. The hooked wheel as a symbol for St Catharine also occurs among the flushwork panels at St Peter's Hall.

The Fundenhall loft paintings are now barely decipherable. Of the five panels above the central span (described by Blomefield before 1752), the middle panel shows a shield with the three crowns of East Anglia surrounded by a votive text to St Edmund in a circular frame. Left of this is the shield for St Peter ("P" surmounted by crossed keys), right is that for the church patron St Nicholas ("S N" surmounted by mitre and ?crown), and far right, placed out of line by the repairer, the shield bearing the hooked St Catherine wheel. Each shield is enclosed within a circular cabled wreath.

== Continuance, 1360–1460 ==
=== Recovery ===
Flixton appears always to have been the poorest of the nunneries in the Norwich diocese, but although it has been said that it never recovered from the deterioration of assets caused by the Black Death (at least not to support the full number of sisters limited by the founder), yet the house did continue in an orderly fashion until the Dissolution. As the surviving fragment of wall shows, some architectural improvements were managed in the later period, and the studies of Marilyn Oliva highlight the maintenance of the obedientiary system here as elsewhere in the diocese. There was apparently a lay community attached to the priory, some permanently resident in the outer court.

The appropriation of Fundenhall church raised new problems, for in 1370 the parishioners invoked the old and recurrent judgement that the Rector was responsible for repairs or rebuilding. At this time Joan Marshall was prioress, and these events coincide with a further acquisition of lands, houses and rents in mortmain, in Stuston (the manor of Fakons), Broome, Thrandeston and Oakley, and substantial rents in Great Yarmouth, to an annual value not exceeding six pounds. This was done to enable the priory to find a chaplain to celebrate divine service every Monday in the conventual church for the souls of the faithful departed. Margery Howell, elected prioress in 1376, ruled the community until her death in 1392. In 1381 Alice, widow of John Brakenest of Halesworth, made her promise of chastity as a vowess at Flixton, and was granted a corrody.

=== Community ===
Katherine Herward, elected prioress in 1392, was by 1402 succeeded by Dame Elizabeth Moor. Elizabeth's tenure ended in 1414, to be replaced by Katherine Pilley, and at about that time a list was drawn up of all the people living within the priory precinct. In addition to the 12 nuns and 2 chaplains, there was a domestic staff of at least 4 maids, a baker and assistant, a cook and porter, estate workers including a cowherd, a swineherd, 2 threshers, a wood-hauler and 2 shop-workers, and 6 female servants. Among those receiving corrodies were Elizabeth Moor late the prioress, two brothers with their wives and maids, two other married couples, three sisters with their maid and chaplain, and a single lady. Their provisions included bread, food, wood and candles. A complement of 12 nuns compared respectably with the wealthier provincial houses.

Katherine Pilley ruled the house praiseworthily for eighteen years. She grew old and blind in her office, and in 1432 resigned her place. In his visitation of 1433 Bishop William Alnwick made special arrangements for Katherine's comfort and support in her old age. She was to have rooms for herself and her maid, with fuel and candles provided, and their meal each day from the refectory as for two nuns: two white loaves and eight of wholemeal a week, and eight gallons of convent beer. Cecilia Creke, a nun, was appointed to read divine service with her each day and to sit with her at meals. After the terms of Maud Rycher (elected 1432) and Mary Delanio, Cecilia Creke was herself elected prioress in 1446.

== The later prioresses ==
Prioress Helen was in charge by 1466, when she resigned and Margery Artis was confirmed as her successor. In 1473 John Brygham, a chaplain associated with the nearby College at Mettingham, Suffolk, since at least 1450, died leaving a psalter to Agnes Virly, a nun of Flixton Priory. Agnes was doubtless a kinswoman of (if not the same person as) Elizabeth Virly, who was prioress of Flixton at the Visitation of Bishop James Goldwell in June 1493. Elizabeth might also be the prioress Isabella (these names being sometimes interchanged at that period) recorded in 1503 who is also rumoured to occur in 1483. Bishop Goldwell found a community of only six nuns, including the prioress and Margaret Causton, the sub-prioress, and that they were not attending mass in the conventual church but in Flixton parish church because their priest had broken his arm and was unable to celebrate. No reforms were needed.

In August 1514 Bishop Nykke found the nuns of Flixton in rebellious mood. There were now eight nuns, of whom only Alicia Laxfield might remember the visitation of 1493. Isabella Asshe stated that for three days a week they were fed only on bread and cheese, and the rule of silence was not observed. The prioress, Margaret Punder, said that some of the sisters were not obedient. Margaret Olton complained of the meagre diet, and said the prioress diverted alms to her own use, did not pay the annual allowances, and did not render accounts, becoming angry if anyone gave them anything. Discipline was not kept, said Elizabeth Wright, and some sisters (especially Elisabeth Asshe and Margaret Rowse) sometimes failed to rise for morning prayer: but the prioress did not support the senior sisters, and was so severe that they scarcely dared to complain. Three said she was keeping frequent company with one John Welles, her kinsman, and one added that she had bought a place in the parish and often met him there. The bishop banished him from the parish completely and forbade him ever to meet her again.

By 1520 Margaret Punder had resigned as prioress, and the community of seven (mostly as before) was now led by Alicia (probably Elizabeth) Wright, who kept a number of dogs. The prioress complained that Margaret was disobedient: Margaret replied that her allowance, her provisions and winter fuel were withheld. The sisters, including Alicia Laxfield, all objected that no special consideration was made when they were ill. The Visitor broke off his inspection and a week later the Chancellor of the Diocese returned to continue. Margaret repeated her complaints, adding that the prioress often slept away from the common dormitory in her own bedroom, without the presence of a sister as chaplain; and that as this was against the rule of their religion, she would not obey her. The others kept quiet apart from Isabella Asshe, who mentioned the meagre fare and said the prioress was meeting with a servant Richard Carr at suspicious times. The prioress was told she must keep only one of her dogs, to have a female chaplain with her when sleeping alone, and to present the accounts, on pain of dismissal: Richard Carr was to be sent away.

== The last years, and suppression ==
At the Visitation of 1526, when the sisterhood had shrunk to six, Margaret Punder spoke favourably, the nuns, led by Alicia Laxfield and backed up by the prioress Elizabeth Wright, did likewise, and Margaret Olton, now sub-prioress, mentioned only that the roofs of the refectory and cloister were leaking, which the prioress was instructed to amend. A greater threat loomed, for Flixton Priory was among the East Anglian monasteries named for suppression by Thomas Wolsey in 1527–28, authorized by the second Papal bull of Clement VII to resource Wolsey's College at Oxford and for his School at Ipswich. Wolsey, however, declined in the King's favour and died in 1530, and Flixton was not yet suppressed. In 1532 Master Miles Spencer, Commissary of Norwich, found the priory all in order with no complaints. Elizabeth Wright, prioress, Margaret Olton, sub-prioress, Alicia Laxfield, sacristan, Agnes Asshe, precentor and Margaret Rouse, infirmarer, were all present, with two new admissions: Margaret Punder was also still there, and knew of nothing needing reform, but as ex-prioress had drawn herself apart from the obedientiary offices ("non est de gremio").

It was therefore under the Suppression of Religious Houses Act 1535, enacted in February 1535/36, that the priory, with possessions falling far below the annual value of £200, was closed. The commissioners making the inventory in August 1536 found a great quantity of vestments and altar cloths. "An old vestement of redde and Green sylke with Swannes of Golde", and "an olde vestemente of redde sylke with Cranes of whight" are evocative. There was a fair amount of plate both for the altar and for the table, including the parcel-gilt silver altar cross with figures of St Mary and St John, cruets, two chalices, three mazers, eight silver spoons, a salt with cover, and a silver goblet. The Buttery utensils were mainly pewter plates and dishes, basins and ewers, and the furniture was very simple. The livestock included 6 kine, 5 horses, 10 pigs and 10 sheep, and there were 10 loads of hay and 10 acres each of corn and of barley. Most of the bedding was very old and little worth, and the kitchen vessels are described as "trasshe".

The priory's temporalities and spiritualities in 1536 are shown in the Valor Ecclesiasticus. Elizabeth Wright as prioress surrendered the house on 4 February 1536–37. It is shown that she maintained contact with some of the nuns after their departure. In July 1537 the priory and its holdings were granted by the crown to Richard Wharton. Wharton, of Bungay, was apparently operating as a speculator, for he had already advised Cromwell of the wealthy men in the neighbourhood in December 1533, listing first John Tasburgh ("has by inheritance £50 per annum, and by his wife £40"). By the time John Tasburgh purchased the priory manor from him in 1544, a substantial part of the priory masonry may already have been removed.
