= Beccles Lido =

Outdoor swimming pool in Beccles, Suffolk, England

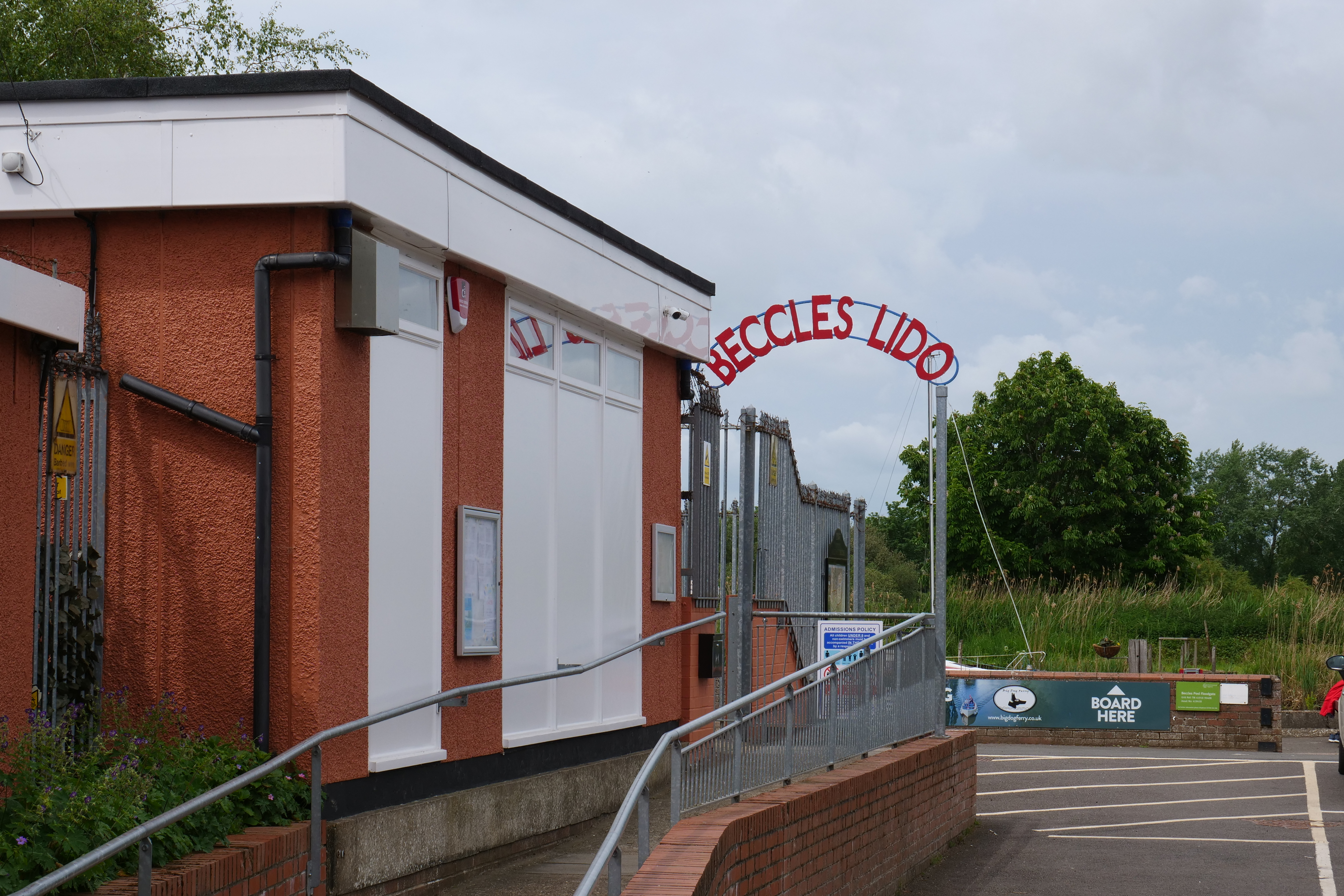
- Beccles Lido in May 2022
- Interactive map of Beccles Lido
- Location: Puddingmoor, Beccles, Suffolk, NR34 9PL
- Coordinates: 52.457709°N 1.559439°E
- Type: Open-air, heated
- Dimensions: Length: 30 metres (98 ft); Width: 16 metres (52 ft)

Construction
- Opened: 1959
- Closed: 2008^{*} Reopened 2010

Website
- beccleslido.com

Beccles Lido is an open-air pool at Puddingmoor, Beccles, Suffolk, on the south bank of the River Waveney.

== Description ==
The lido is 30 x 16 metres with a 1-metre springboard, small slide, paddling pool and sunbathing area.

It is normally open from late May to early September. It was closed throughout 2009 but reopened August 2010 following a change of ownership and subsequent refurbishment.

== History ==
The lido was constructed in 1959 on the site of an older bathing pool. Prior to that swimmers used a fenced off part of the River Waveney in the town.

Heating was installed in 1975.

In 2004 Waveney District Council announced plans to close the lido and to build an indoor swimming pool. In reaction to these plans, the Friends of Beccles Outdoor Pool campaign started in 2006. In 2009, Waveney District Council decided they would no longer manage the Beccles Lido (nor Halesworth Open Air Pool) after April 2009 so neither opened. Beccles Lido Limited was created and they re-opened the lido in 2010.

The chairman of Beccles Lido, Maureen Saunders, won a community pride award in July 2009 for her work campaigning for the lido and establishing the management company.

Beccles Swimming Pool is one of the town’s most popular summer sporting attractions providing not only a pleasant riverside leisure spot for local people and holiday visitors alike but also valuable service as a place where people can learn to swim.

— Beccles & Bungay Journal, April 3rd 1976
