= St Nicholas South Elmham =

Former civil parish in Suffolk, England

Coordinates: 52.395°N 1.411°E

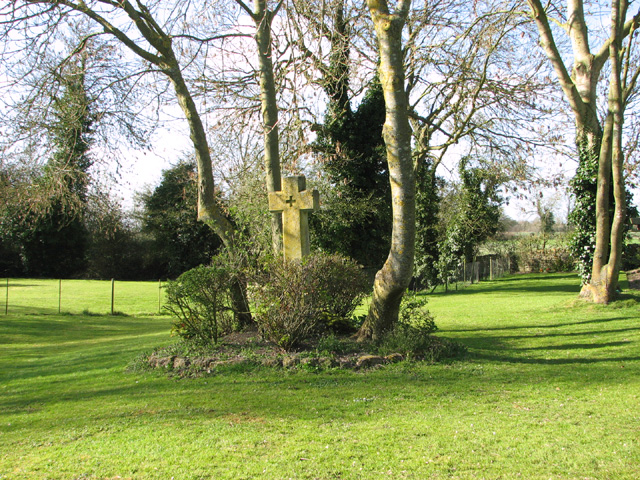
- Cross marking the site of St Nicholas' church

- Location within Suffolk
- OS grid reference: TM323829
- Civil parish: All Saints and St Nicholas, South Elmham
- District: East Suffolk
- Shire county: Suffolk
- Region: East
- Country: England
- Sovereign state: United Kingdom
- Post town: Harleston
- Postcode district: IP20
- Dialling code: 01986
- UK Parliament: Waveney

St Nicholas South Elmham is a place and former civil parish in the north of the English county of Suffolk. The parish was combined with All Saints' South Elmham in 1737 to form the parish of All Saints and St. Nicholas, South Elmham. It is 5 miles (8.0 km) south of the market town of Bungay in the East Suffolk district. It is part of the area around Bungay known as The Saints.

The village has always been sparsely populated, with the population rising to around 100 in the early 19th-century, with 94 residents at the 1851 United Kingdom census. The combined population of the modern parish is around 130. The main area of population in St Nicholas is spread along the road leading from around St Margaret South Elmham to the site of the former parish church.

The church of St Nicholas was in ruins by the 17th-century and by the early 20th-century only a cross survived marking the position of the building. The parish church is now All Saints Church, South Elmham, although it is formally redundant and cared for by the Churches Conservation Trust.
