= All Saints Church, South Elmham =

Coordinates: 52.3936°N 1.4226°E

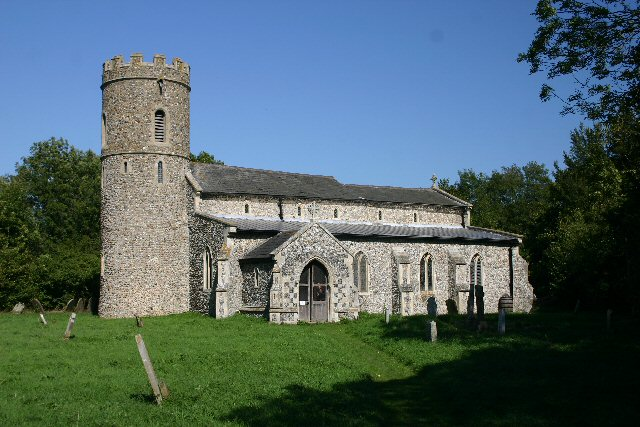
- All Saints Church, South Elmham, from the southeast

- Location in Suffolk
- OS grid reference: TM 330 828
- Location: All Saints' South Elmham, Suffolk
- Country: England
- Denomination: Anglican
- Website: Churches Conservation Trust

History
- Dedication: All Saints

Architecture
- Functional status: Redundant
- Heritage designation: Grade I
- Designated: 1 September 1953
- Architectural type: Church
- Style: Norman, Gothic

Specifications
- Materials: Flint with freestone dressings

All Saints Church is a redundant Anglican church in the village of All Saints' South Elmham, one of a group of villages jointly known as The Saints, in Suffolk, England. It is recorded in the National Heritage List for England as a designated Grade I listed building, and is under the care of the Churches Conservation Trust.

The church stands in an isolated position at the end of a lane adjacent to the moated Church Farm. It is one of around 40 round-tower churches in Suffolk. (Note: The exact number of round-tower churches in the county is a matter of debate. Some sources list 38, others cite between 40 and 43. They almost all date from the late Anglo-Saxon or early Norman periods and were mostly built between the 11th and 14th-centuries. There are around 183 round-tower churches in England, most of them in Norfolk, which has around 124, and Suffolk. Four of the churches now in Norfolk were previously in Suffolk before boundary changes in 1974.)

== History ==
All Saints is included in the district of South Elmham. "This district includes nine parishes and forms a subdivision of the Hundred of Wangford, anciently called the liberty, manor, or township of South Elmham. It was granted by Sigebert [Sigeberht], King of the East Angles [Anglia], to Felix the Burgundian, his first bishop, who fixed his see at Dunwich in 630 A.D.." Several parish churches were founded here in Saxon times, All Saints being one of them.

During the reign of Henry VIII the seat was seized in exchange for other lands. In the Cotton Manuscripts, Nero C. ix, is an indenture between Henry VII and Edward North, Esq., Treasurer of the Court of Augmentations, dated 4 December 1540, where in exchange for land in the county of Buckingham, North was given rights to the manor as well as the parish churches of Saint James, Saint Peter, Saint Margarette, Saint Nicholas and All Saints of South Elmham. The land was possessed from the thirty-second year of the reign of Henry VII until the reign of King James I by the North family. It was then conveyed to Sir John Tasburgh, Knight, 20 May 1613, the manor with the rectories and all the demesnes. The descendants of Sir John retained the lordship of South Elmham until the male line died out and it was passed to the Wybornes. The estate was then purchased about 1753 by William Adair, Esq.

All Saints dates from the 12th century. The south aisle was added in about 1250, or slightly earlier. Further additions and alterations took place in the 14th, 15th and 17th centuries. The church was "considerably restored" in 1870. The churchyard is currently cared for by the Suffolk Wildlife Trust.

All Saints was frequently called All-Hallows. It was consolidated with the parish of St. Nicholas on December 8, 1737, totaling 1620 acres. The population of All Saints, in 1841, was 224 persons.

== Architecture ==
=== Exterior ===
The church is constructed in flint with freestone dressings, and has a lead roof. Its plan consists of a continuous nave and chancel, with a south aisle which runs along the whole length of the nave and chancel, a south porch, and a west tower. The tower is on three stages, and is round in cross-section up to its summit. At one time the top stage was octagonal, but in 1846 it had been "recently removed". In the bottom stage is a west Norman window, and in the middle stage are small round-headed windows. In the top stage the bell openings are also round-headed and have louvres. The parapet is battlemented. Along the north wall of the body of the church are three single-light Norman windows, three 13th-century two-light windows, two 14th-century single-light windows, and a blocked doorway. The 14th-century windows contain Perpendicular tracery. The east window has three lights. On the south wall of the aisle are three windows with Y-tracery. The porch dates from the medieval period, but the south doorway is Romanesque Revival from the Victorian era.

=== Interior ===
The arcade between the nave and the south aisle dates from the 14th century. In the chancel is a piscina in Early English style which has been much restored. The font dates from the 12th century. It consists of a large square bowl carved with blank arches, supported by a central column and four smaller columns, standing on a rectangular base. There is a variety of benches. Two of these date from the 15th century, are carved with poppyheads and animals. They were originally in the porch, and consequently are weathered. Others, also dating from the 15th century, are carved with poppyheads only, and the rest are 19th-century reproductions. The single-manual organ is at the east end of the south aisle. It was built in 1884 By Eustace Ingram.

== See also ==
- List of churches preserved by the Churches Conservation Trust in the East of England
