= All Saints and St Nicholas, South Elmham =

Civil parish in Suffolk, England

Coordinates: 52.392°N 1.423°E

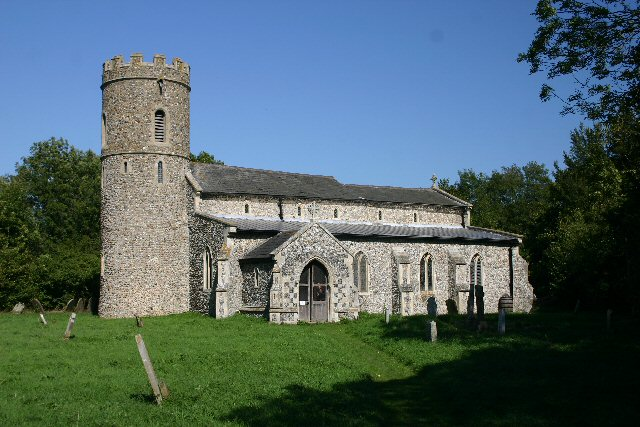
- The church of All Saints

- Location within Suffolk
- Area: 7 km^{2} (2.7 sq mi)
- Population: 130 (2005 est.)
  - Density: 19/km^{2} (49/sq mi)
- OS grid reference: TM330826
- District: East Suffolk
- Shire county: Suffolk
- Region: East
- Country: England
- Sovereign state: United Kingdom
- Post town: Halesworth
- Postcode district: IP19
- Post town: Harleston
- Postcode district: IP20
- Dialling code: 01986
- UK Parliament: Waveney

All Saints and St Nicholas, South Elmham is a civil parish in the north of the English county of Suffolk. It is 5 miles (8.0 km) south of the market town of Bungay and the same distance north-west of Halesworth and east of Harleston. The parish is in the East Suffolk district and is one of the parishes that make up the area around Bungay known as The Saints. It includes the settlements of All Saints, South Elmham and St Nicholas, South Elmham.

The parish has a population of around 130. (Note: 2011 United Kingdom census population data does not report population figures for parishes where the population is small enough to potential identify individuals and the population of All Saints and St Nicholas was combined with the sparsely populated parishes of St Peter South Elmham and St Michael South Elmham. As a result no population figure is available for All Saints and St Nicholas South Elmham at the census. The population figure for the three parishes combined was 233.) It borders the parishes of St Peter South Elmham, St Michael South Elmham, St Margaret South Elmham, St Cross South Elmham, St James South Elmham and Rumburgh. The parish council is operated jointly with St Peter and St Michael South Elmham.

== History ==
The parish is believed to be part of the land given by Sigeberht of East Anglia, the ruler of the Anglo-Saxon Kingdom of East Anglia to Felix of Burgundy during the 7th-century. At the Domesday survey on 1086, both All Saints and St Nicholas were included as part of the area recorded as South Elmham in Wangford Hundred. A population of 108 households was recorded. By the early 12th-century, the land was held by the Bishop of Norwich, before being seized during the Dissolution of the Monasteries and transferred to Edward North, 1st Baron North in 1535.

By the late 16th century the Tasburgh family from the Flixton area had become dominant in the parish. The Adair family from Cratfield later became the main landowners. The two parishes of All Saints and St Nicholas were combined in 1737.

== Culture and community ==
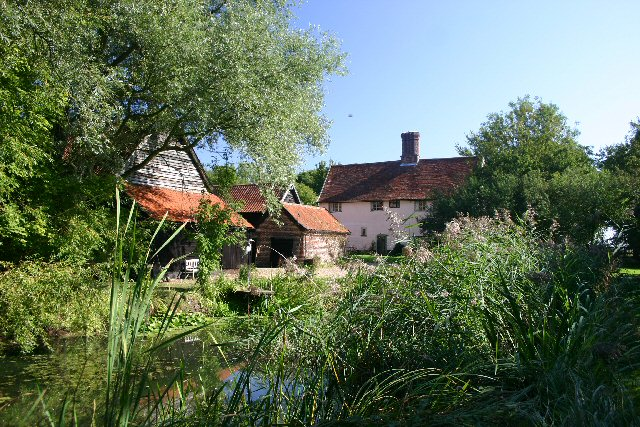
Moated farmhouse next to All Saints church.

The parish church of All Saints survives, although it is formally redundant and cared for by the Churches Conservation Trust. It is a Grade I listed building, dates from the 12th-century and is one of around 40 round-tower churches in Suffolk. (Note: The exact number of round-tower churches in the county is a matter of debate. Some sources list 38, others cite between 40 and 43. They almost all date from the late Anglo-Saxon or early Norman periods and were mostly built between the 11th and 14th-centuries. There are around 183 round-tower churches in England, most of them in Norfolk―which has around 124―and Suffolk. Four of the churches now in Norfolk were previously in Suffolk before boundary changes in 1974.) Other than the parish church, the village has no services.

The church of St Nicholas was in ruins by the 17th-century and by the early 20th-century only a cross survived marking the position of the building.
