= Richard Cowling Taylor =

Richard Cowling Taylor (18 January 1789 – 26 October 1851) was an English surveyor and geologist.

== Life ==
Taylor, third son of Samuel Taylor, farmer, was born at Hinton, Suffolk, on 18 January 1789. He was educated at Halesworth, and articled to Mr. Webb, land surveyor at Stow-on-the-Wold, Gloucestershire, in July 1805. He received further instruction from William Smith (1769–1839), the "Father of British geology", and finally became a land surveyor at Norwich in 1813, moving to London in October 1826.

In the early part of his career he was engaged on the Ordnance Survey of England. Subsequently he was occupied in reporting on mining properties, including that of the British Iron Company in South Wales, his plaster model of which received the Isis medal of the Society of Arts.

In July 1830 he went to the United States of America, and, after surveying the Blossburg coal region in Pennsylvania, spent three years in the exploration of the coal and iron veins of the Dauphin and Susquehanna Coal Company in Dauphin County in the same state. He published an elaborate report with maps. He also made surveys of mining lands in Cuba and the British provinces.

His knowledge of theoretical geology led him to refer the old red sandstone that underlies the Pennsylvania coalfields to its true place, corresponding with its location in the series of European rocks. He was elected a fellow of the Geological Society of London.

He died at Philadelphia on 26 October 1851, having married in 1820 Emily, daughter of George Errington of Great Yarmouth, by whom he had four daughters.

== Works ==
He devoted much time to archæology, and published ‘Index Monasticus, or the Abbeys and other Monasteries … formerly established in the Diocese of Norwich and the Ancient Kingdom of East Anglia,’ 1821. His other principal works were:

- ‘On the Geology of East Norfolk,’ 1827.
- ‘Statistics, History, and Description of Fossil Fuel,’ 2nd edit. 1841.
- ‘Statistics of Coal,’ Philadelphia, 1848; 2nd edit. revised, 1854.
- ‘The Coalfields of Great Britain, with Notices of Coalfields in other parts of the World,’ 1861.

He compiled the index to the new edition of William Dugdale's Monasticon (1860), which took him two years. He also contributed fourteen papers to the archives of the United Friars of Norwich, and many articles to the Magazine of Natural History.
