= Rumburgh =

Village in Suffolk, England

Coordinates: 52.380°N 1.446°E

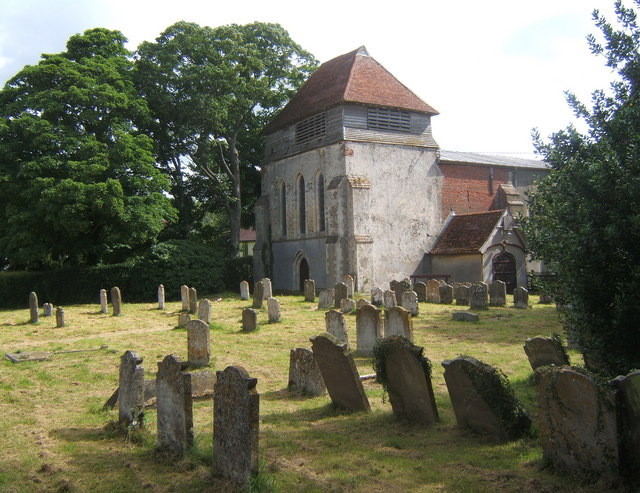
- Church of St Michael & St Felix

- Location within Suffolk
- Area: 6 km^{2} (2.3 sq mi)
- Population: 327 (2011)
  - Density: 55/km^{2} (140/sq mi)
- OS grid reference: TM345814
- District: East Suffolk
- Shire county: Suffolk
- Region: East
- Country: England
- Sovereign state: United Kingdom
- Post town: Halesworth
- Postcode district: IP19
- Dialling code: 01986
- UK Parliament: Waveney Valley

Rumburgh is a village and civil parish in the English county of Suffolk. It is 3.5 miles (5.6 km) north-west of the market town of Halesworth in the East Suffolk District. The population of the parish at the 2011 United Kingdom census was 327.

The village is centred around a road junction, with development extending in a linear fashion. There is an additional cluster of housing at Aldous Corner as well as a number of scattered farms throughout the parish. The parish borders the parishes of St James South Elmham, All Saints and St Nicholas South Elmham, St Michael South Elmham, Ilketshall St Margaret, Spexhall and Wissett.

== History ==
The village was not mentioned directly in the Domesday Book, but Rumburgh Priory was founded in the parish in about 1065. A Benedictine priory, it was founded as a cell of St Benet's Abbey at Hulme in Norfolk. At the time of the Domesday survey it had 12 monks. The priory was "suppressed" in 1528 by Cardinal Wolsey and used to provide funds for the building of Cardinal College in Ipswich.

== Culture and community ==
The parish church dates from the 13th-century and is the former priory church. It is dedicated to St Michael and St Felix and has an unusual wide tower dating from the same period the church was built. The nave and chancel date from the 15th-century and the south porch from the 16th-century. The church is a Grade I listed building.

Other than the church, Rumburgh has a village hall, playing field and a public house, the Rumburgh Buck.
