= All Saints' South Elmham =

Village in Suffolk, England

Coordinates: 52.392°N 1.440°E

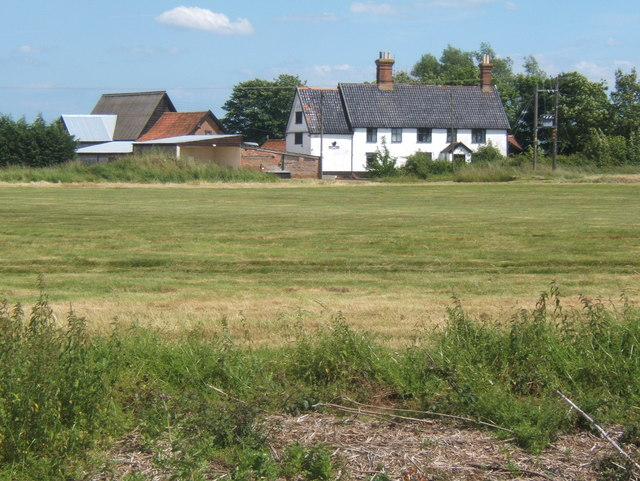
- Moat Farm on All Saints Common

- Location within Suffolk
- OS grid reference: TM343827
- Civil parish: All Saints and St Nicholas, South Elmham
- District: East Suffolk
- Shire county: Suffolk
- Region: East
- Country: England
- Sovereign state: United Kingdom
- Post town: Halesworth
- Postcode district: IP19
- Dialling code: 01986
- UK Parliament: Waveney

All Saints' South Elmham is a village and former civil parish in the north of the English county of Suffolk. The parish was combined with St Nicholas South Elmham in 1737 to form the parish of All Saints and St. Nicholas, South Elmham. It is 5 miles (8.0 km) south of the market town of Bungay in the East Suffolk district. It is one of the villages that make up the area around Bungay known as The Saints.

The main area of population in the village is clustered around All Saints Common, a large area of common land. All Saints' was recorded as having a population of 192 in 1801 and 232 by the time of the 1851 United Kingdom census. The combined population of the modern parish is around 130.

The parish church of All Saints survives, although it is formally redundant and cared for by the Churches Conservation Trust. It is a Grade I listed building, dates from the 12th-century and is one of around 40 round-tower churches in Suffolk. (Note: The exact number of round-tower churches in the county is a matter of debate. Some sources list 38, others cite between 40 and 43. They almost all date from the late Anglo-Saxon or early Norman periods and were mostly built between the 11th and 14th-centuries. There are around 183 round-tower churches in England, most of them in Norfolk, which has around 124, and Suffolk. Four of the churches now in Norfolk were previously in Suffolk before boundary changes in 1974.) Other than the parish church, the village has no services.
