= Ringsfield =

Village in Suffolk, England

Coordinates: 52.437°N 1.540°E

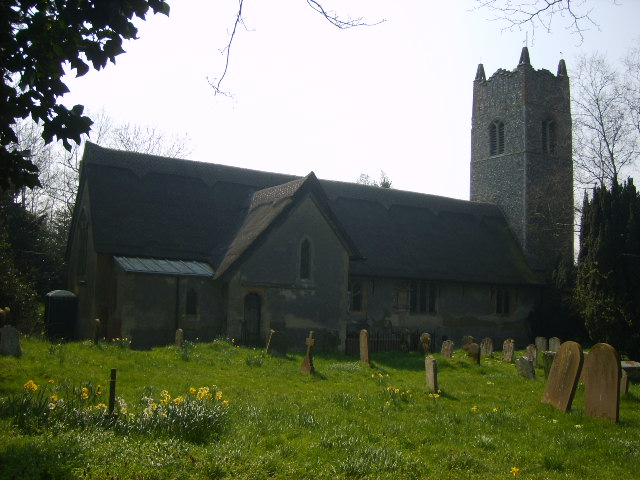
- All Saints Church

- Location within Suffolk
- Area: 7 km^{2} (2.7 sq mi)
- Population: 323 (2011)
  - Density: 46/km^{2} (120/sq mi)
- OS grid reference: TM408881
- District: East Suffolk
- Shire county: Suffolk
- Region: East
- Country: England
- Sovereign state: United Kingdom
- Post town: Beccles
- Postcode district: NR34
- Dialling code: 01502
- UK Parliament: Lowestoft

Ringsfield is a village and civil parish in the English county of Suffolk. It is 2 miles (3.2 km) south-west of Beccles in the East Suffolk district.

The parish had a population of 323 at the 2011 United Kingdom census. It borders the parishes of Beccles, Weston, Redisham, Ilketshall St Andrew and Barsham. The parish council operates jointly with Weston.

== History ==
At the Domesday survey of 1086 Ringsfield was a large village with a population of 100 households. Most of the land was in the direct holdings of King William, with other holdings controlled by Hugh d'Avranches, Earl of Chester and Roger Bigot. It formed part of Wangford Hundred.

The manor passed through a number of families, including the Roos family of nearby Roos Hall. The population of the parish grew to over 300 by the 19th century. It declined in the early 20th century, although house building since the 1970s has led to an increase.

The parish was combined with Little Redisham, around 1 mile (1.6 km) south west of Ringsfield, in 1627. The former St James' church was in ruins by the early 17th century and now forms part of the park surrounding Redisham Hall, the northern part of which is located within Ringsfield parish.

Redisham Hall was originally built in the 16th century and is the site of a likely embarked deserted medieval village. It was rebuilt in 1823 by John Garden to replace a previous Elizabethan house. It is a Grade II listed building located in 400 acres (1.6 km^{2}) of parkland partly in the parish, to the south-west of the village. It passed down in the Garden family to John Lewis Garden, a big game hunter and husband of Caroline Murat (1833–1902). Parts of the hall are now used as holiday cottages.

== Culture and community ==
The modern village is concentrated around a crossroads at Ringsfield Corner, 1/2 mile (0.80 km) south of the parish church. The boundary divides this community, with some of the housing within the Weston parish area. Ringsfield Hall, in the north of the parish, is an outdoor education centre.

The village has a primary school, village hall with a playing field and tennis courts, and a public house, the Horseshoes. Few other services remain.

== Church of All Saints ==
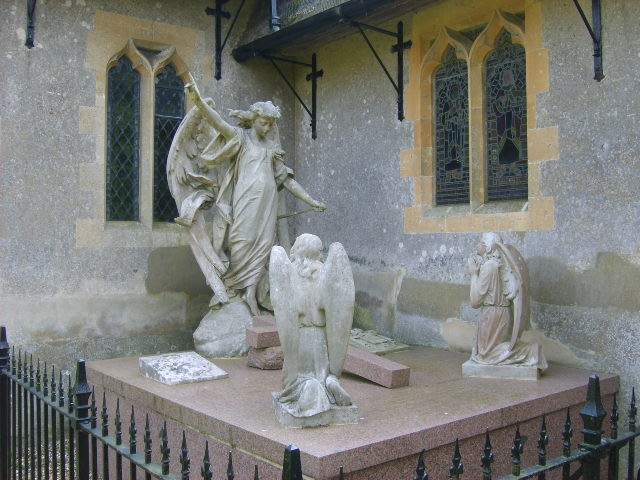
Tomb of Caroline Murat, Baroness de Chassiron

The parish church is dedicated to All Saints. The building is medieval in origin, with a tower built in 1450. It was refurbished in the 1880s.

The churchyard contains the grave and memorial of the American born Princess Caroline Murat (1833–1902), great niece of Napoleon Bonaparte and granddaughter of Joachim Murat, King of Naples. She lived and died at Redisham Hall after marrying John Lewis Garden, whose family seat it was. The church is a Grade II* listed building.

The former St James' church at Little Redisham is in ruins.
