= St James South Elmham =

Village in Suffolk, England

Coordinates: 52.379°N 1.408°E

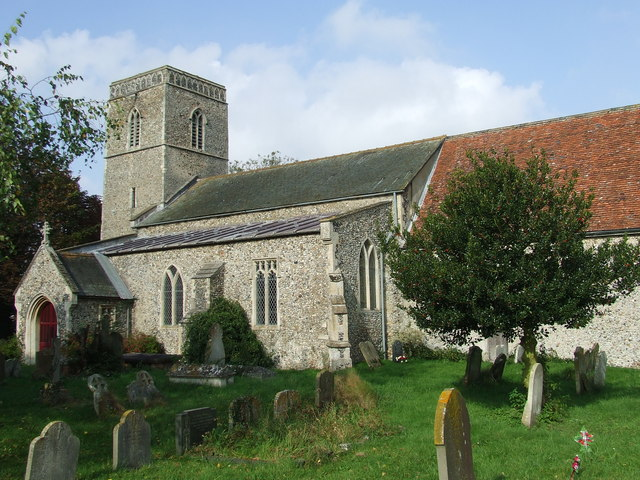
- Church of St James

- Location within Suffolk
- Area: 5 km^{2} (1.9 sq mi)
- Population: 205 (2011)
  - Density: 41/km^{2} (110/sq mi)
- OS grid reference: TM321811
- District: East Suffolk
- Shire county: Suffolk
- Region: East
- Country: England
- Sovereign state: United Kingdom
- Post town: Halesworth
- Postcode district: IP19
- Dialling code: 01986
- UK Parliament: Waveney

St James South Elmham is a village and civil parish in the north of the English county of Suffolk. It is 4.5 miles (7.2 km) north-west of the market town of Halesworth and 5.5 miles (8.9 km) south-west of Bungay in the East Suffolk district. It is one of the parishes around Bungay known as the Saints.

The parish had a population of 205 at the 2011 United Kingdom census. It is an isolated parish in a rural area and borders the parishes of St Cross South Elmham, All Saints and St Nicholas South Elmham, Rumburgh, Wissett, Chediston and Metfield. The village is spread along the road between All Saints' South Elmham and Metfield.

The parish church is dedicated to St James and dates from the 12th-century. It has a 13th-century tower and contains a number of Norman windows and a 12th-century font with a 15th-century cover. The church is a Grade I listed building; a medieval moated site close to the church is a scheduled monument. Parts of RAF Metfield, a World War II airfield built in 1943 and used by the United States Air Force, extend into the west of the parish. An explosion in July 1944, caused by the mishandling of a number of bombs, shook the surrounding area, including St James.

Other than the church few services remain in the village. It has a village hall and a recreation ground which was transferred to the control of the parish council in 2020. A community orchard is located to the west of the village. The village public house, the White Horse, closed in 1991.
