= The Saints, Suffolk =

Villages named after a Saint

Coordinates: 52.41°N 1.47°E

The Saints are a group of villages in the north of the English county of Suffolk, between the rivers Blyth and Waveney near to the border with Norfolk. The villages are all named after a saint (that of their parish church), and either South Elmham or Ilketshall named after the 'hall of Alfkethill'. Known by locals as 'up the Parishes' the area is found between the market towns of Halesworth, Harleston, Bungay and Beccles.

South Elmham comes from the Anglo-Saxon "hamlet where elms grew" and is first mentioned in Domesday Book as Almeham; North Elmham is in Norfolk, 30 miles (48 km) away.

The Saints are:

- All Saints' South Elmham
- St Cross South Elmham (also known as Sancroft St George, and Sancroft).
- St James South Elmham
- St Margaret South Elmham
- St Mary, South Elmham (also known as Homersfield)
- St Michael South Elmham
- St Nicholas South Elmham (church no longer present)
- St Peter South Elmham
- Ilketshall St Andrew
- Ilketshall St John
- Ilketshall St Lawrence
- Ilketshall St Margaret
- Flixton is generally grouped within the Saints
- Rumburgh Priory is historically connected with the Saints churches and is less than 1 km from All Saints South Elmham

Each of the villages also constitutes a civil parish, apart from All Saints and St Nicholas, which are joined in the All Saints and St Nicholas, South Elmham parish. St Michael is one of the doubly Thankful Villages.

It is unclear whether North Elmham in Norfolk or South Elmham in Suffolk is the site of East Anglia's second See ("Helmham"), founded in the reign of King Ealdwulf (c.664-713) according to Bede.

The Saints is the setting for much of Michael Ondaatje's Warlight, a mystery set in the 1950s in which the area is described as having a unique culture.

== Governance ==
An electoral ward of Waveney District Council with the same name exists. The population of this ward taken at the 2011 Census was 2,242.
