= Ilketshall St Andrew =

Village in Suffolk, England

Coordinates: 52.431°N 1.498°E

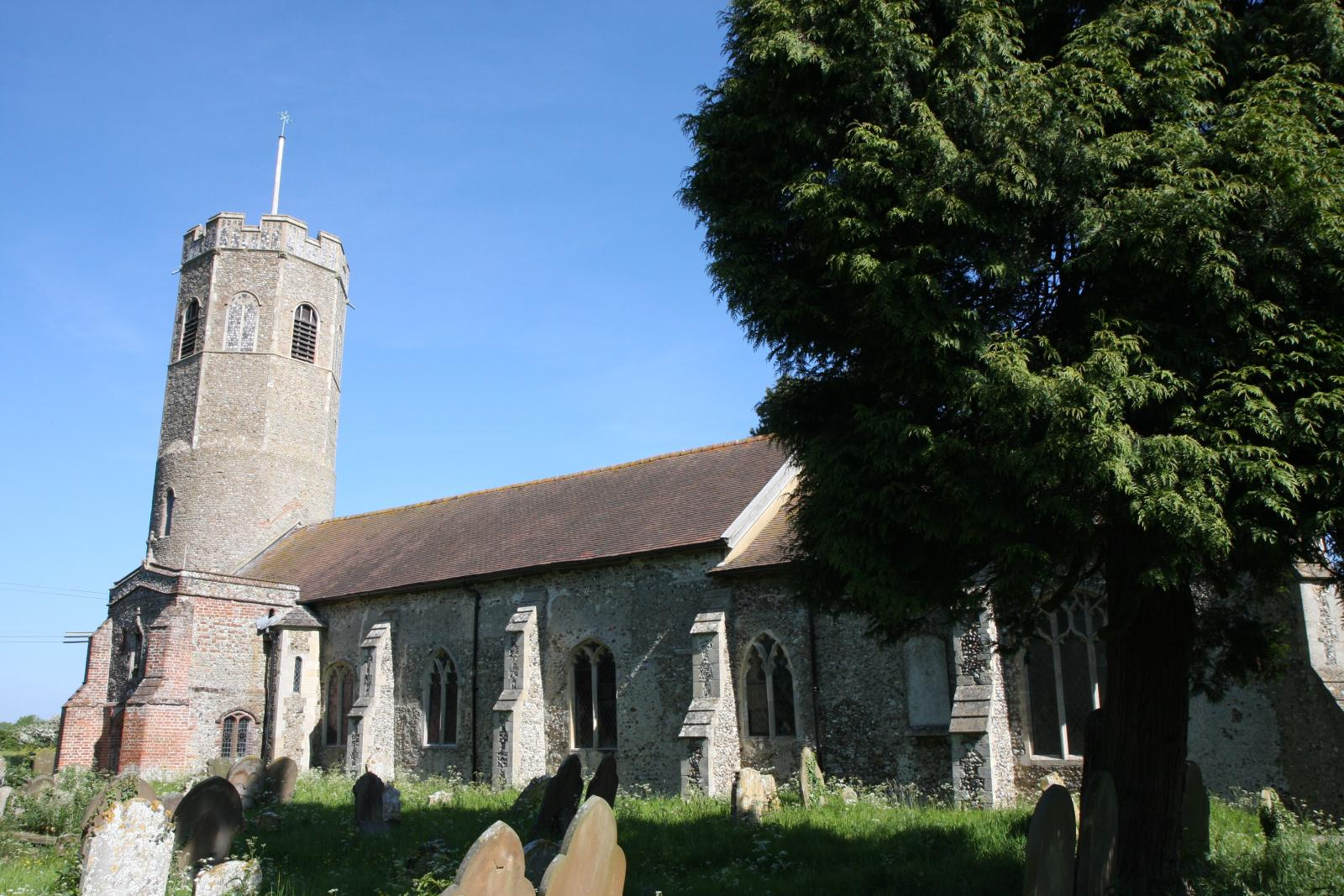
- St Andrew's church

- Location within Suffolk
- Area: 7 km^{2} (2.7 sq mi)
- Population: 291 (2011)
  - Density: 42/km^{2} (110/sq mi)
- OS grid reference: TM379871
- District: East Suffolk
- Shire county: Suffolk
- Region: East
- Country: England
- Sovereign state: United Kingdom
- Post town: Beccles
- Postcode district: NR34
- Dialling code: 01986
- UK Parliament: Waveney

Ilketshall St Andrew is a village and civil parish in the north of the English county of Suffolk. It is 3 miles (4.8 km) south-east of Bungay and the same distance south-west of Beccles in the East Suffolk district. St Andrew's church is one of around 40 round-tower churches in Suffolk. (Note: The exact number of round-tower churches in the county is a matter of debate. Some sources list 38, others cite between 40 and 43. They almost all date from the late Anglo-Saxon or early Norman periods and were mostly built between the 11th and 14th-centuries. There are around 183 round-tower churches in England, most of them in Norfolk, which has around 124, and Suffolk. Four of the churches now in Norfolk were previously in Suffolk before boundary changes in 1974.)

The parish had a population of 291 at the 2011 United Kingdom census. It is one of a group around Bungay known as The Saints, and is located east of the A144 road between Bungay and Halesworth. The parish borders the parishes of Shipmeadow, Ringsfield, Redisham, Westhall, Spexhall, Ilketshall St Lawrence and Ilketshall St John.

== History ==
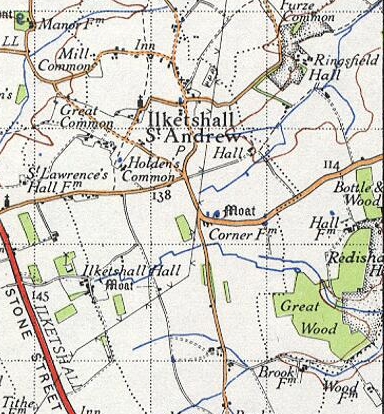
20th-century map of St Andrew, Ilketshall, in Suffolk

In the 1870s John Marius Wilson's Imperial Gazetteer of England and Wales described Ilketshall St Andrew as:

"Ilketshall St. Andrews, a parish in Wangford district, Suffolk; 4 miles SE of Bungay r. station. It has a postal letter box under Bungay. The property is much subdivided. The living is a vicarage in the diocese of Norwich. The church has an octangular tower, and is in good condition. There is a Wesleyan chapel."

== Churches ==
St Andrew's church is a round-tower church, dating from the 12th century. The church sits at a bend in School Road and has an octagonal-shaped bell tower. In 1810 there was a screen between the body of the church and the chancel, which was destroyed in December 2001, revealing a series of wall paintings. These paintings are similar to those found in St Botolph's, North Cove. The image depicts the theme of the 'Wheel of Fortune' and the unpredictable nature of human affairs. A crowned figure is found sitting on top of a wheel rotating it, to which humankind must follow the rotation. The rotation is circular, so a downturn in human affairs must be inevitably followed by an upturn.

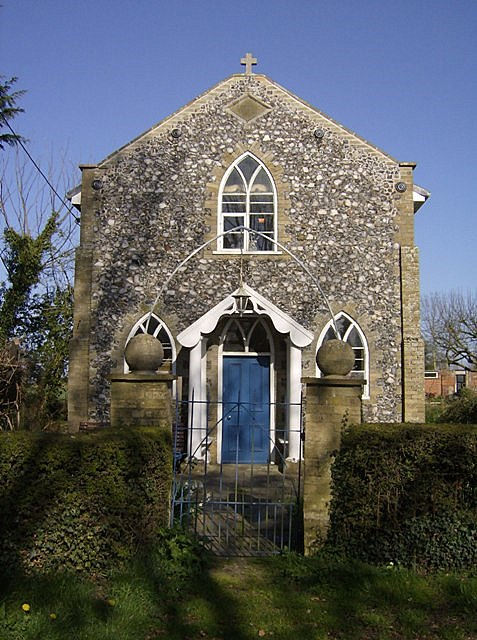
The Wesleyan Chapel of Ilketshall St Andrew. It is no longer in church use.

A Methodist chapel was built in 1840 by the local Wesleyan Society. The chapel is a Grade II listed building, with a small garden at the front of the chapel. Worship at the chapel has now ceased.
