= Flixton, The Saints =

Village in Suffolk, England

Coordinates: 52.431°N 1.398°E

Flixton
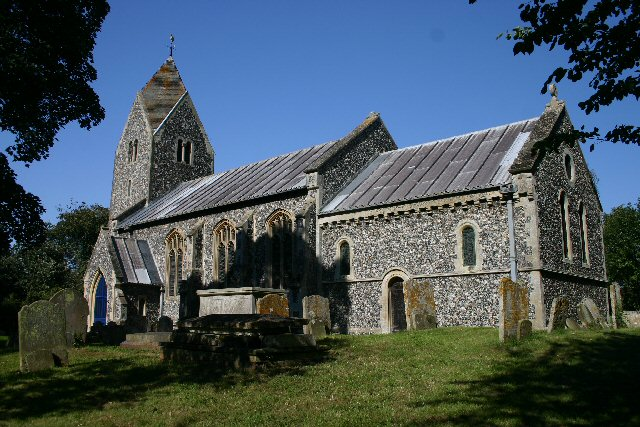
- St Mary's Church

- Location within Suffolk
- Area: 7 km^{2} (2.7 sq mi)
- Population: 176 (2011)
  - Density: 25/km^{2} (65/sq mi)
- OS grid reference: TM311869
- Civil parish: Flixton
- District: East Suffolk
- Shire county: Suffolk
- Region: East
- Country: England
- Sovereign state: United Kingdom
- Post town: Bungay
- Postcode district: NR35
- Dialling code: 01986
- UK Parliament: Waveney Valley

Flixton is a village and civil parish located in the north of the English county of Suffolk. It is around 2 miles (3.2 km) south-west of Bungay in the East Suffolk district and is one of the villages around Bungay which make up the area known as The Saints. The A143 road runs just to the north of the parish border linking Bungay with Harleston and Diss.

The north-western boundary of the parish is marked by the River Waveney on the Norfolk border. As well as Bungay, the parish borders the Suffolk parishes of St Cross South Elmham, St Margaret South Elmham, Homersfield, St Peter South Elmham and Ilketshall St Margaret and the Norfolk parishes of Earsham and Denton. The parish council is joined with Flixton and St Cross and St Margaret South Elmham.

At the 2011 United Kingdom census the parish had a population of 176. It was the site of a medieval Augustine priory and a World War II airfield and is the modern site of two food processing factories and an aviation museum.

== History ==
Flixton Priory was founded in the 13th century. The ruined remains of the moated priory are located to the south of the village near to Abbey Farm. These include sections of wall, earthworks and fishponds.

The substantial Flixton Hall provided one of the backdrops for the 1947 children's film The Secret Tunnel, before being demolished in the 1950s.

RAF Bungay was located at Flixton. The World War II airfield was built in 1942 as a base for bombers of the United States Army Air Forces' Eighth Air Force. At the end of the war the airfield was used as a prisoner of war camp and then by the RAF as a bomb store until its closure in 1955. Some areas of the airfield remain, including parts of a taxiway and a war memorial dedicated to the 446th Bombardment Group, nicknamed the Bungay Buckeroos, which was based at Bungay from November 1943 until the end of the war. The Norfolk and Suffolk Aviation Museum is located in the village today.

== Abbey Wood SSSI ==
Abbey Wood, located to the south of the village, is an area of ancient woodland designated as a Site of Special Scientific Interest (SSSI). The site covers 18.5 hectares (45.7 acres) and includes a range of woodland species such as oak, ash and hazel as well as the rare woodland floor thin-spiked Wood Sedge, Carex strigosa. The woods were probably once associated with Flixton abbey, the site of which borders the woods.
