= St Peter South Elmham =

Village in Suffolk, England

Coordinates: 52.410°N 1.434°E

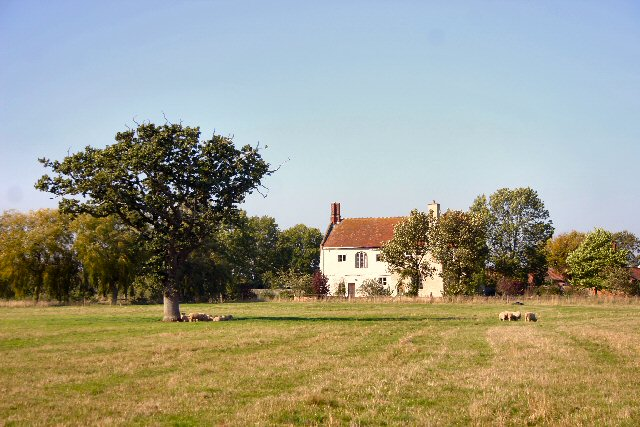
- St Peter's Hall

- Location within Suffolk
- Area: 2.4 km^{2} (0.93 sq mi)
- Population: 40 (2005 est.)
  - Density: 17/km^{2} (44/sq mi)
- OS grid reference: TM337847
- District: East Suffolk
- Shire county: Suffolk
- Region: East
- Country: England
- Sovereign state: United Kingdom
- Post town: Bungay
- Postcode district: NR35
- Dialling code: 01986
- UK Parliament: Lowestoft

St Peter South Elmham is a village and civil parish in the north of the English county of Suffolk. It is around 3 miles (4.8 km) south of the market town of Bungay in the East Suffolk district. It is one of the villages surrounding Bungay which make up the area known as The Saints.

The parish is sparsely populated with an estimated population in 2005 of around 40. (Note: 2011 United Kingdom census population data does not report population figures for parishes where the population is small enough to potential identify individuals. As a result no population figure is available for St Peter South Elmham at the census, although it is likely to have fallen from this figure.) It borders the parishes of St Margaret South Elmham, St Michael South Elmham, All Saints and St Nicholas South Elmham, Ilketshall St Margaret and Flixton. The parish council operates jointly with All Saints and St Nicholas and St Michael.

== History ==
The parish is believed to be part of the land given by Sigeberht of East Anglia, the ruler of the Anglo-Saxon Kingdom of East Anglia to Felix of Burgundy during the 7th century. In the Domesday Book of 1086, St Peter was included as part of the area recorded as South Elmham in Wangford Hundred. A population of 108 households was recorded. By the early 12th century, the land was held by the Bishop of Norwich, before being seized during the Dissolution of the Monasteries and transferred to Edward North, 1st Baron North in 1535.

By the late 16th century the Tasburgh family from the Flixton area had become dominant in the parish. The parish has always been sparsely populated, reaching a population of 129 in the 1801 census, but falling to below 100 by 1851 and below 50 by 1951.

== Culture and community ==
There are no local services other than the parish church, which is dedicated to St Peter. This dates from the 12th century and is a Grade II* listed building. Two former public houses are known to have operated in the village; both are believed to have closed by 1927.

St Peter's Hall, a moated Grade II* listed manor house with elements from the 13th century, is the location of St. Peter's Brewery, founded in 1996 on the site. It was the home of the Tasburgh family, a prominent local family. The brewery operates a public bar and restaurant on the site during the summer months. Businessman and former Formula One Group chief executive Bernie Ecclestone was born in the parish at a property close to the church, now called Hawk House and formerly one of the pubs in the village.
