= St Michael South Elmham =

Village in Suffolk, England

Coordinates: 52.404°N 1.438°E

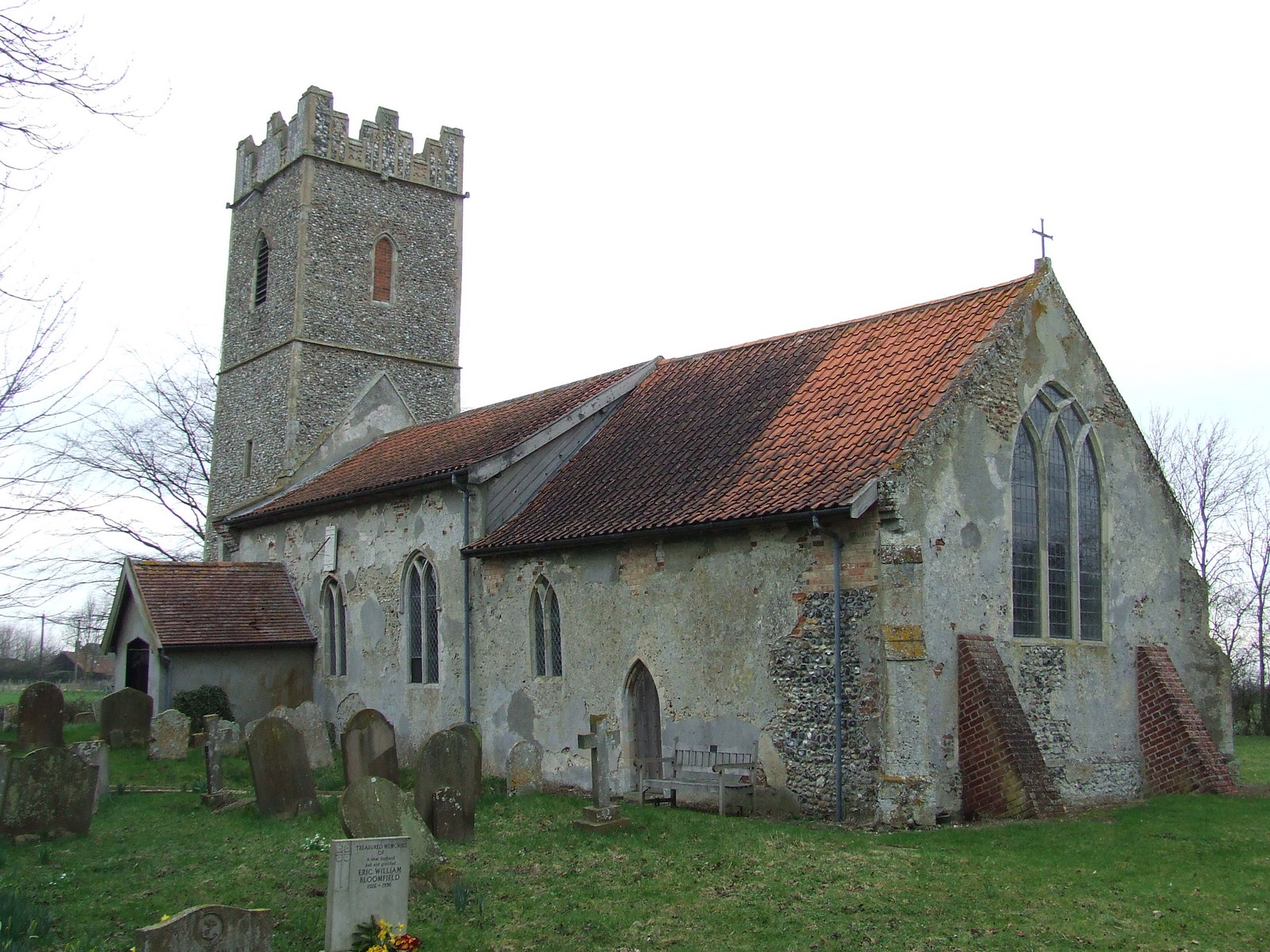
- St Michael's church

- Location within Suffolk
- Area: 2.4 km^{2} (0.93 sq mi)
- Population: 60 (2005 est.)
  - Density: 25/km^{2} (65/sq mi)
- OS grid reference: TM340840
- District: East Suffolk
- Shire county: Suffolk
- Region: East
- Country: England
- Sovereign state: United Kingdom
- Post town: Bungay
- Postcode district: NR35
- Dialling code: 01986
- UK Parliament: Waveney

St Michael South Elmham is a village and civil parish in the north of the English county of Suffolk. It is 4 miles (6.4 km) south of the market town of Bungay in the East Suffolk district. It is one of the villages surrounding Bungay which make up the area known as The Saints.

The parish is sparsely populated with an estimated population of around 60. (Note: 2011 United Kingdom census population data does not report population figures for parishes where the population is small enough to potential identify individuals. As a result no population figure is available for St Michael South Elmham at the census.) It borders the parishes of St Peter South Elmham, All Saints and St Nicholas South Elmham, Ilketshall St Margaret and Rumburgh. The parish council operates jointly with All Saints and St Nicholas and St Michael.

With no residents killed during World War I, the village is one of two Thankful Village in Suffolk. It is one of only fourteen doubly thankful villages in England, in that it lost no residents in World War II either.

The village is featured on Darren Hayman's album, Thankful Villages Volume 1.
