= Ilketshall St Margaret =

Village in Suffolk, England

Coordinates: 52.415°N 1.454°E

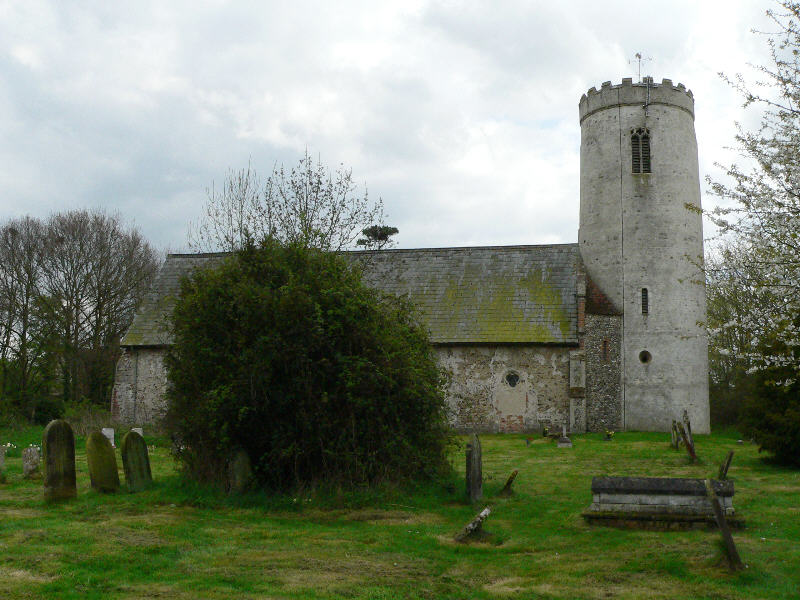
- St Margaret's Church

- Location within Suffolk
- Area: 8 km^{2} (3.1 sq mi)
- Population: 160 (2011 est.)
  - Density: 20/km^{2} (52/sq mi)
- OS grid reference: TM350853
- District: East Suffolk
- Shire county: Suffolk
- Region: East
- Country: England
- Sovereign state: United Kingdom
- Post town: Bungay
- Postcode district: NR35
- Dialling code: 01986
- UK Parliament: Waveney

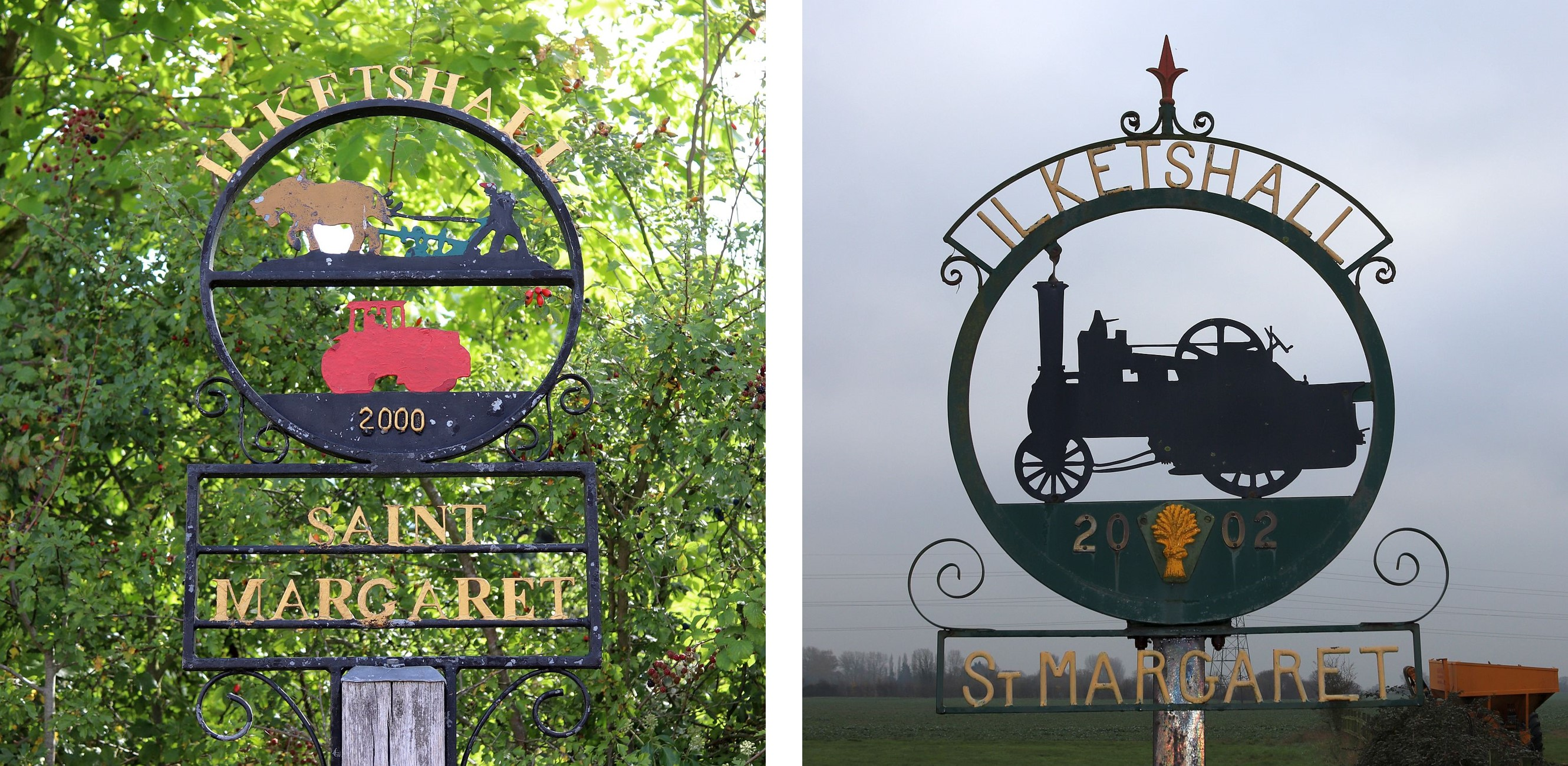
Ilketshall St Margaret two village signs

Ilketshall St Margaret is a village and civil parish in the north of the English county of Suffolk. It is 3 miles (4.8 km) south of the market town of Bungay in the East Suffolk district. The parish is part of the area known as the Saints and had a population of 178 at the 2021 census (United Kingdom).

The parish is sparsely populated and situated to the west of the A144 road between Bungay and Halesworth. It borders the parishes of Bungay, Ilketshall St John, Ilketshall St Lawrence, Spexhall, Rumburgh, St Michael South Elmham, St Peter South Elmham, and Flixton.

The parish church is dedicated to St Margaret. It dates from the early 11th century and features a round tower, one of around 40 round-tower churches in Suffolk. (Note: The exact number of round-tower churches in the county is a matter of debate. Some sources list 38, others cite between 40 and 43. They almost all date from the late Anglo-Saxon or early Norman periods and were mostly built between the 11th and 14th-centuries. There are around 183 round-tower churches in England, most of them in Norfolk, which has around 124, and Suffolk. Four of the churches now in Norfolk were previously in Suffolk before boundary changes in 1974.) The village is mentioned in W. G. Sebald's novel The Rings of Saturn.
