= Redisham =

Village in Suffolk, England

Coordinates: 52.405°N 1.540°E

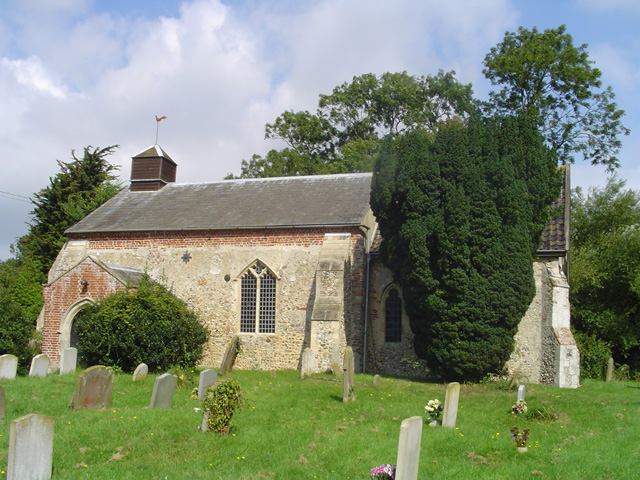
- St Peter's Church

- Location within Suffolk
- Area: 3 km^{2} (1.2 sq mi)
- Population: 125 (2011)
  - Density: 42/km^{2} (110/sq mi)
- OS grid reference: TM409844
- District: East Suffolk
- Shire county: Suffolk
- Region: East
- Country: England
- Sovereign state: United Kingdom
- Post town: Beccles
- Postcode district: NR34
- Dialling code: 01502
- UK Parliament: Waveney

Redisham is a village and civil parish in the English county of Suffolk. It is located 3 1/2 miles (5.6 km) south-west of Beccles and 4 1/3 miles (7.0 km) north-east of Halesworth in the East Suffolk district. The population of the parish was 125 at the 2011 United Kingdom census.

The parish is in a rural location. It borders Ilketshall St Andrew, Westhall, Brampton with Stoven, Shadingfield, Weston and Ringsfield. The village is on the eastern border of the parish, with some of the housing in it across the border in Shadingfield.

The village has limited services, although Brampton railway station on the East Suffolk Line is closer to Redisham than it is to Brampton. The parish church is dedicated to St Peter. It is a Grade I listed building with a Norman doorway and has been the site of a church since the 10th Century. It is reported to be the smallest church in Suffolk with only 60 seats.

The author Adrian Bell farmed a smallholding in the village during World War II. This was the childhood home of his children, translator Anthea Bell and the journalist and politician Martin Bell.

Redisham Hall is located to the north of the village but is in Ringsfield parish.
