= St Margaret South Elmham =

Village in Suffolk, England

Coordinates: 52.404°N 1.401°E

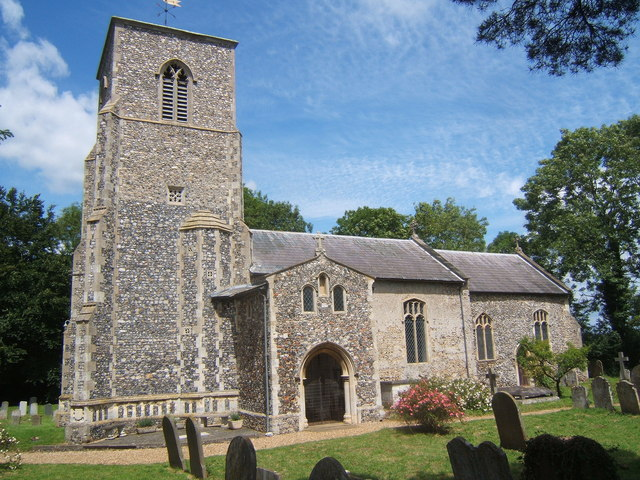
- Church of St Margaret

- Location within Suffolk
- Area: 2.4 km^{2} (0.93 sq mi)
- Population: 100 (2005 est.)
  - Density: 42/km^{2} (110/sq mi)
- OS grid reference: TM314839
- District: East Suffolk
- Shire county: Suffolk
- Region: East
- Country: England
- Sovereign state: United Kingdom
- Post town: Harleston
- Postcode district: IP20
- Dialling code: 01986
- UK Parliament: Waveney

St Margaret South Elmham is a village and civil parish in the north of the English county of Suffolk. It is 4 miles (6.4 km) south-west of the market town of Bungay in the East Suffolk district. It is one of the parishes surrounding Bungay which are known as The Saints.

The parish has a population of around 100. (Note: 2011 United Kingdom census population data does not report population figures for parishes where the population is small enough to potential identify individuals and the population of St Margaret was combined with that of St Cross South Elmham. As a result no population figure is available for either parish at the census.) It borders the parishes of Flixton, St Cross South Elmham, St Peter South Elmham and All Saints and St Nicholas South Elmham. The parish council is operated jointly with Flixton and St Cross South Elmham.

The village is spread along the road linking St Cross South Elmham with All Saints and St Nicholas South Elmham, with a small cluster of houses around St Magarets Green, an area of common land at the southern border of the parish. Other than a village hall and the parish church, the village has no services.

The village church is dedicated to St Margaret. It has a Norman south doorway, a 14th-century tower and was restored during the 1870s. The church is a Grade I listed building. South Elmham Hall, a medieval moated site and former palace of the Bishop of Norwich, is on the eastern edge of the parish, extending into St Cross South Elmham. The site is a scheduled monument and the hall a Grade I listed building.
