= Homersfield =

Village in Suffolk, England

Coordinates: 52.420°N 1.359°E

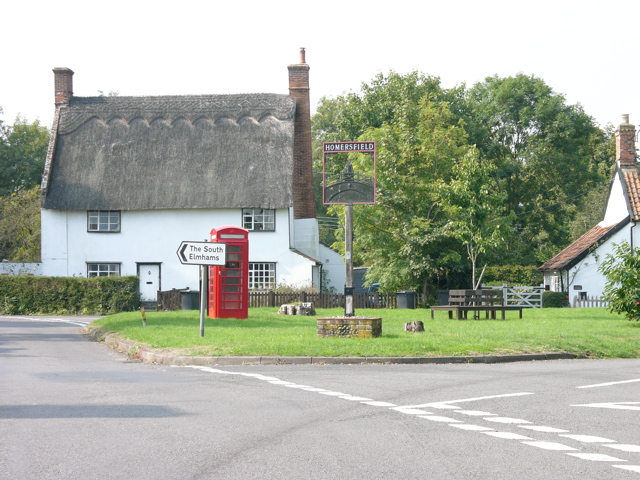
- Homersfield village green

- Location within Suffolk
- Area: 4 km^{2} (1.5 sq mi)
- Population: 158 (2011)
  - Density: 40/km^{2} (100/sq mi)
- OS grid reference: TM284856
- Civil parish: St Mary, South Elmham otherwise Homersfield
- District: East Suffolk
- Shire county: Suffolk
- Region: East
- Country: England
- Sovereign state: United Kingdom
- Post town: Harleston
- Postcode district: IP20
- Dialling code: 01986
- UK Parliament: Waveney

Homersfield, also known as St Mary, South Elmham, is a village and civil parish in the north of the English county of Suffolk. It is in the East Suffolk district, 4 miles (6.4 km) south-west of the market town of Bungay and 3 miles (4.8 km) north-east of Harleston. The official name of the civil parish is St Mary, South Elmham otherwise Homersfield. It is one of the parishes around Bungay known as The Saints.

The parish had a population of 158 at the 2011 United Kingdom census. The northern boundary of the parish is the River Waveney which marks the county border with Norfolk. It borders the Suffolk parishes of Flixton, St Cross South Elmham and Mendham and the Norfolk parishes of Denton, Alburgh and Wortwell.

== Transport ==
The B1062 road runs through the parish. This was the main road between Diss and Bungay until the main A143 road was built along the route of the Waveney Valley railway line to the north of the Waveney. This operated between 1860 and 1964 and Homersfield railway station was located just across the river, serving the village.

Homersfield Bridge, a 50 feet (15 m) span bridge across the Waveney, was built in 1870 by the Adair estate. It is the oldest surviving concrete bridge in Britain. A replacement bridge was built in 1970 just to the east and the bridge is now open only to pedestrians and cycles. It was restored during the 1990s.

== Culture and community ==
The village is clustered around a green close to the Waveney. The parish church is dedicated to St Mary and dates from the 12th-century with a 14th-century tower. The interior of the church was heavily restored in 1866. The church is a Grade II* listed building. From 1754 until the sale of Flixton Hall in the 1940s, the village was largely an estate village controlled by the Adair baronets connected to Flixton Hall just to the east.

Other than the church, the only remaining service in the village is the Black Swan public house. One of the first community bus services in England operated in the parish in the late-1970s. A series of six thatched almshouses, Barnfield Cottages, were built in the village during the 1920s by the Adair estate. Designed by Maurice Chesterton, they remain in use and are a Grade II listed building.

Sands and gravels have been quarried at Homersfield since the 1940s. The Breedon Group operates Flixton Qaurry and Concrete plant in the east of the parish close to the site of Flixton Hall. A lake, the site of a former gravel pit, is a commercial fishery located between the village and the modern quarry. A 0.7 hectares (1.7 acres) geological Site of Special Scientific Interest borders the quarry and is named Flixton Quarry. It provides a cross-section through the Homersfield Terrace, part of the valley of the Waveney.
