= St Cross South Elmham =

Village in Suffolk, England

Coordinates: 52.406°N 1.380°E

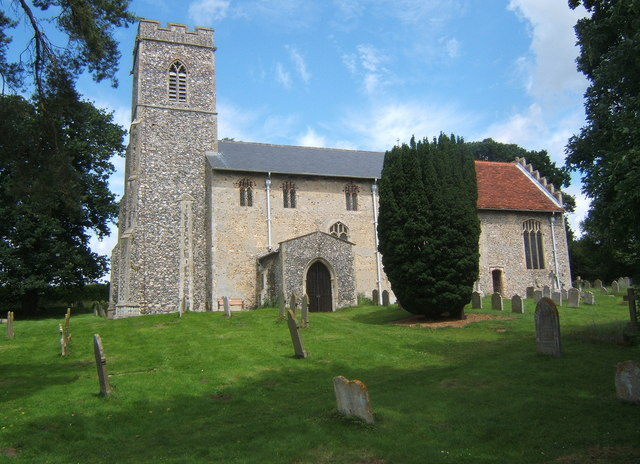
- Church of St George

- Location within Suffolk
- Area: 5 km^{2} (1.9 sq mi)
- Population: 217 (2005 est.)
  - Density: 43/km^{2} (110/sq mi)
- OS grid reference: TM299841
- District: East Suffolk
- Shire county: Suffolk
- Region: East
- Country: England
- Sovereign state: United Kingdom
- Post town: Harleston
- Postcode district: IP20
- Dialling code: 01986
- UK Parliament: Waveney

St Cross South Elmham is a village and civil parish in the north of the English county of Suffolk. It is in the East Suffolk district, close to the border with Norfolk and is 3 miles (4.8 km) east of Harleston and 4.25 miles (6.84 km) south-west of Bungay. It is one of the villages around Bungay known as the Saints.

The parish has a population of around 120. (Note: 2011 United Kingdom census population data does not report population figures for parishes where the population is small enough to potential identify individuals and the population of St Cross was combined with that of St Margaret South Elmham. As a result no population figure is available for either parish at the census.) The parish borders the parishes of St Margaret South Elmham, Homersfield, Flixton, All Saints and St Nicholas South Elmham, St James South Elmham, Metfield and Mendham. The parish council is joined with Flixton and St Margaret South Elmham.

The parish name is a portmanteau of the medieval parish name "Saint George Sancroft", as the village church is named St George. The Sancroft part of the name comes from the sandy nature of the soil in the area surrounding the church of St George. The modern village itself is small and lacks services beyond the parish church. A volunteer group known as Waveney Community Bus, provide a bus service to residents living in the St Cross area.

St Cross is known for its views of the English countryside and was home to the poet and writer Elizabeth Smart for the last years of her life. She was buried in the graveyard of the church of St George after her death in 1986.

== History ==
St Cross was created as a result of the merger with the lands around Homersfield in 1767. Before this it was part of the lands owned by the See of Norwich until the reign of King Henry VIII, its revenues distributed to the Church. With the dissolution of the monasteries in 1540 the land was transferred back to the crown. The manor and its surrounding lands were eventually given to the North family in the 17th century valued at £20. After the Norths, the manor and its lands were transferred to the Tasburgh family. Eventually ownership was taken over by the Durrant family in the 19th century. It is unknown who owned the land of St Cross from the 17th–19th century before the Durrant family took ownership.

In 1870–72, St Cross South Elmham was described by John Marius Wilson's Imperial Gazetteer of England and Wales as

"St. Cross, or Sandcroft, a parish in Wangford district, Suffolk; adjacent to the river Waveney, and to the Waveney Valley railway, near Homersfield r. station, 5 miles SW of Bungay. The church is tolerable. Some remains exist of a moated minster, with nave 42 feet by 27, and apsidal chancel 24 feet."

In 1868 The National Gazetteer of Great Britain and Ireland described St Cross as

"South Elmham St.Cross, (or Sandcroft), a parish in the hundred of Wangford, county Suffolk, as above, 5 miles S.W. of Bungay, and 4 N.E. of Harleston, its post town. There was formerly a monastic establishment here, the remains of which are surrounded by a moat. The living is a rectory annexed to that of Homersfield, in the diocese of Norwich. The church is a neatly built edifice with square embattled tower, and Norman arch at the S. entrance. St. Margaret's Hall is the principal residence. Sir R. Adair is lord of the manor."

== Places of interest ==
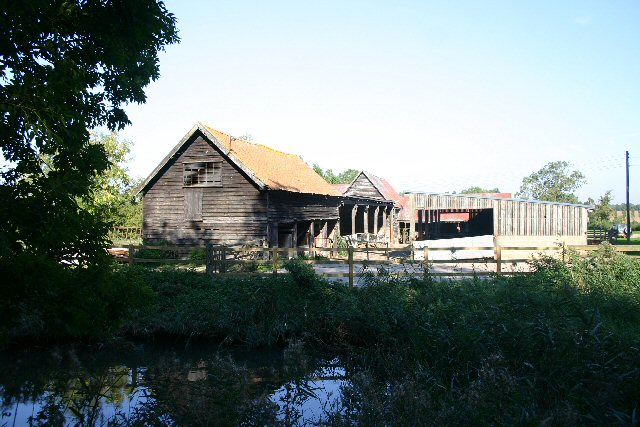
The Barns at South Elmham Hall

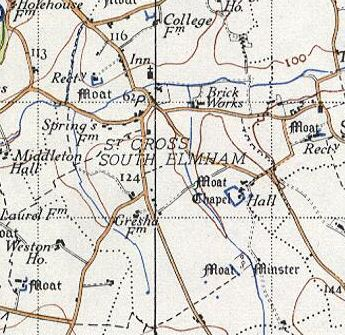
1945 Ordnance Survey Map showing the St Cross South Elmham area.

=== South Elmham Hall ===
The parish contains South Elmham Hall, surrounded by a four-acre moat and which was formerly the country residence of the Bishop of Norwich. The hall is currently known as Bateman's Barn and offers guided historic tours of the house and its grounds during the summer months. South Elmham Hall has been listed as a grade one building. The building contains primarily 16th century architecture, alongside 15th century arches constructed during the Bishops ownership of South Elmham Hall. The primary attraction of the South Elmham area to the Bishops was the hunting opportunities provided by a deer park established in the local area. This was not without problems with reports of the deer being poached by the residents of St Cross in 1315. The Hall also hosted royal family members on several occasions, most notably in 1326 when Edward II stayed for ten days on his way to Norwich, carrying out government business during his stay there. The remains of previous buildings and settlements nearby to the hall have long since decayed, although around 45 detailed surviving records in the Suffolk Record Office indicate the area used to contain stables, mews and gatehouses. The ruins of one of the gatehouses survives and can be still be seen today. South Elmham Hall also has the earliest domestic wall paintings in Suffolk, dating from 1270.

=== The Church of St George ===
The village contains the church of St George first constructed around a century before the Norman conquest of Britain, though many modifications and added developments were made in the centuries afterwards, such as the addition of the square bell tower in the 14th century. The church is the largest of the churches in the Saints area and has been through several renewals over its history, to restore and renovate areas including the floor, which was replaced with Victorian styled tiles in the 19th century and the benches, which were replaced when the previous ones started to decay. St George's is now open to the public on a daily basis after previously being kept locked for a number of years.

=== South Elmham Minster ===
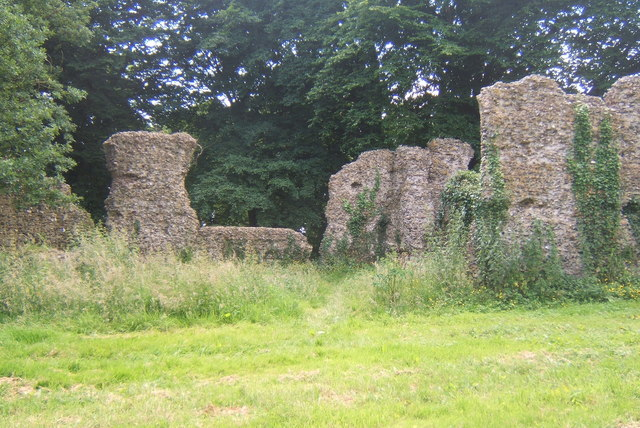
The minster ruins

Nearby to South Elmham Hall lies the remains of a site known as South Elmham Minster. The remains date from Roman times, before the Norman conquest of Britain and the building is believed to have been the private chapel of the Bishop of Norwich during his residence at South Elmham Hall. The chapel was built on the remains of a Roman temple that had previously been located there. The exact reasons behind the chapel's disuse and abandonment are unknown, as it fell out of use in the sometime in the 13th century.
