= East Suffolk District Council elections =

Local government elections in Suffolk, England

Elections of members of East Suffolk District Council in Suffolk, England are held every four years, following the merger of Waveney and Suffolk Coastal districts to form the new East Suffolk district in April 2019. 55 councillors are elected to the chamber, with 29 wards each electing either one, two or three representatives. The first elections to East Suffolk District Council were held on 2 May 2019.

== Council elections ==
Year	Conservative	Labour	Liberal Democrats (Note: Includes totals for the predecessors of the Liberal Democrats, the Liberal Party and SDP (both of which participated in the Alliance).)	Green	Independents & Others	Council control after election
Council established from the merger of Suffolk Coastal & Waveney (55 seats)
2019	39	7	3	4	2	Conservative
2023	15	12	11	16	1	No overall control

== Results maps ==
2019 results map

2023 results map

== By-election results ==
A by-election occurs when seats become vacant between council elections. Below is a summary of by-elections from 2019 onwards. Full by-election results are listed under the last regular election preceding the by-election and can be found by clicking on the ward name.

=== 2019-present ===
Ward	Date	Incumbent party	Winning party
Beccles & Worlingham	6 May 2021	Green	Green
Framlingham	6 May 2021	Conservative	Conservative
Aldeburgh & Leiston	8 July 2021	Conservative	Green
Aldeburgh & Leiston	8 July 2021	Conservative	Conservative
Orwell & Villages	12 August 2021	Conservative	Conservative
Carlton Colville	4 July 2024	Conservative	Conservative
Rushmere St Andrew	27 February 2025	Conservative	Conservative
Woodbridge	27 February 2025	Liberal Democrats	Liberal Democrats
