= Kesgrave Hall School =

Location
- Hall Road; Ipswich, Suffolk, IP5 2PU; England; 52°04′15″N 1°15′24″E

Information
- Type: Boarding School
- Established: 1976
- Closed: 1993
- Headmasters: Derek Sheppard (1975–1984), Michael Smith (1984–1992), Eric Richardson (1992–1993), and John Williams (1993)
- Gender: Male (Single Sex)
- Age: 11 to 18
- Enrolment: 40

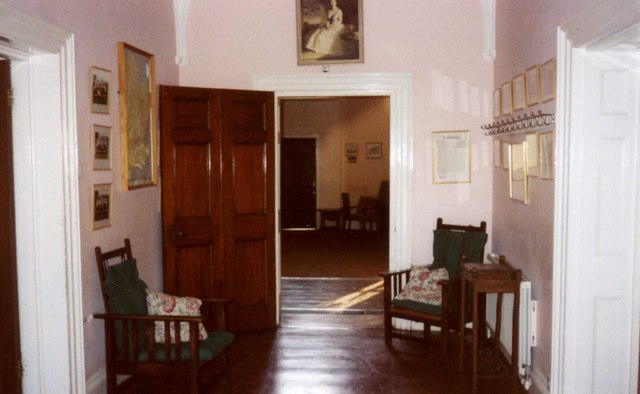
Main entrance hall

Kesgrave Hall School was a private boys' boarding school in Kesgrave, England, catering to pupils with high academic potential who were unable to flourish in mainstream schools.

== Incidents ==
Alan Stancliffe was convicted, in 1982, in 1999, and again in 2007, of indecently assaulting five boys at Kesgrave Hall School where he had been a teacher from 1978 to 1980.

In December 2012, former pupils of the school came forward to describe the abuse they had suffered there during the 1980s, and their call for a new investigation was taken up and successful. In May 2014, after being questioned over allegations of sexual abuse, Kenneth Wheatley (Scott), a former care worker at the school and a convicted child sex offender, was found dead. In September 2014, Alan Stancliffe died while on bail facing a fourth set of child sex allegations.

In November 2014, former language teacher, house-parent and Ofsted inspector Michael Lafford killed himself by swallowing pills when police investigating online child pornography visited his house.

In March 2016, former care staff member John McKno admitted the sexual abuse of five boys, all under 16 and one under 14, at Kesgrave Hall, Beam College in Great Torrington, Devon, and St Michael's College in Tenbury Wells, Worcs. He worked at Kesgrave Hall between 1986 and 1987. On 13 May 2016, he was jailed for 14 years at Ipswich Crown Court. McKno died of cardiac failure in September 2019 after choking on his breakfast in prison.

== See also ==
- Kesgrave Hall
- List of schools in Suffolk
