= 2019 East Suffolk District Council election =

English local Election

- 2 May 2019

All 55 seats in East Suffolk District Council 28 seats needed for a majority

	First party	Second party	Third party
Party	Conservative	Labour	Green
Seats won	39	7	4
Popular vote	52,080	12,232	29,957
Percentage	38.2%	17.0%	22.0%
	Fourth party	Fifth party
Party	Liberal Democrats	Independent
Seats won	3	2
Popular vote	15,582	6,486
Percentage	11.4%	4.8%
- Winner of each seat at the 2019 East Suffolk District Council election.
Council control before election
Conservative (Waveney)
Conservative (Suffolk Coastal)
Council control after election
Conservative

The 2019 East Suffolk District Council election took place on 2 May 2019 to elect all 55 members of the recently formed East Suffolk District Council in England. This was held on the same day as other local council elections across England.

== Summary ==
=== Election result ===
2019 East Suffolk District Council election
Party	Candidates	Seats	Gains	Losses	Net gain/loss	Seats %	Votes %	Votes	+/−
Conservative	55	39	N/A	N/A	N/A	70.9	38.2	52,080	N/A
Labour	41	7	N/A	N/A	N/A	12.7	17.0	12,232	N/A
Green	37	4	N/A	N/A	N/A	7.3	22.0	29,957	N/A
Liberal Democrats	30	3	N/A	N/A	N/A	5.5	11.4	15,582	N/A
Independent	11	2	N/A	N/A	N/A	3.6	4.8	6,486	N/A
UKIP	16	0	N/A	N/A	N/A	0.0	6.6	8,950	N/A

== Ward results ==
=== Aldeburgh & Leiston ===
Aldeburgh & Leiston (3 councillors)
Party	Candidate	Votes	%	±%
Conservative	T-J Haworth-Culf	1,265	33.7	N/A
Conservative	Jocelyn Bond	1,179	31.4	N/A
Independent	Tony Cooper	1,154	30.8	N/A
Conservative	Maureen Jones	1,151	30.7	N/A
Independent	Marianne Fellowes	1,051	28.0	N/A
Labour	Philip Harle	835	22.3	N/A
Labour	Sean O'Reilly	779	20.8	N/A
Green	Matthew Oakley	717	19.1	N/A
Labour	Sushila Zeitlyn	612	16.3	N/A
Green	Julian Cusack	577	15.4	N/A
Green	Marion Wells	504	13.4	N/A
Liberal Democrats	Jules Ewart	429	11.4	N/A
Majority		114	3.0	N/A
Majority		28	0.7	N/A
Majority		3	0.1	N/A
Turnout		3,780	38.2	N/A
Rejected ballots		29	0.8	
Registered electors		9,903		
Conservative win (new seat)				
Conservative win (new seat)				
Independent win (new seat)				

=== Beccles & Worlingham ===
Beccles & Worlingham (3 councillors)
Party	Candidate	Votes	%	±%
Green	Elfrede Brambley-Crawshaw	3,806	72.4	N/A
Green	Caroline Topping	3,456	65.7	N/A
Green	Graham Elliott	3,439	65.4	N/A
Conservative	Mark Bee	1,293	24.6	N/A
Conservative	Graham Catchpole	1,110	21.1	N/A
Conservative	Brian Woodruff	840	16.0	N/A
UKIP	Len Allen	477	9.1	N/A
Labour	Peter Shelley	276	5.2	N/A
Labour	Tarek Lahin	273	5.2	N/A
Majority		2,513	47.8	N/A
Majority		2,163	41.1	N/A
Majority		2,146	40.8	N/A
Turnout		5,272	44.1	N/A
Rejected ballots		14	0.3	
Registered electors		11,961		
Green win (new seat)				
Green win (new seat)				
Green win (new seat)				

=== Bungay & Wainford ===
Bungay & Wainford (2 councillors)
Party	Candidate	Votes	%	±%
Conservative	David Ritchie	1,078	43.1	N/A
Conservative	Judy Cloke	1,068	42.7	N/A
Green	Annette Abbott	850	34.0	N/A
Green	Pauline Midwinter	695	27.8	N/A
Labour	Ian Graham	384	15.3	N/A
Labour	David Sullivan	346	13.8	N/A
Liberal Democrats	Dave O'Neill	242	9.7	N/A
Liberal Democrats	Skydi Thompson	211	8.4	N/A
Majority		1,425	56.9	N/A
Majority		1,415	56.5	N/A
Turnout		2,545	36.0	N/A
Rejected ballots		42	1.7	
Registered electors		7,072		
Conservative win (new seat)				
Conservative win (new seat)				

=== Carlford & Fynn Valley ===
Carlford & Fynn Valley (2 councillors)
Party	Candidate	Votes	%	±%
Conservative	Colin Hedgley	1,307	50.5	N/A
Conservative	Anthony Fryatt	1,293	49.9	N/A
Green	Daniel Clery	702	27.1	N/A
Liberal Democrats	Mark Gibbons	621	24.0	N/A
Green	Eamonn O'Nolan	512	19.8	N/A
Labour	Theresa-Jane Dunningham	288	11.1	N/A
Labour	Jane Mardell	269	10.4	N/A
Majority		605	23.4	N/A
Majority		591	22.8	N/A
Turnout		2,636	38.9	N/A
Rejected ballots		46	1.7	
Registered electors		6,785		
Conservative win (new seat)				
Conservative win (new seat)				

=== Carlton & Whitton ===
Carlton & Whitton (2 councillors)
Party	Candidate	Votes	%	±%
Conservative	Frank Mortimer	737	31.8	N/A
Conservative	Trish Mortimer	698	30.1	N/A
Labour	Sonia Barker	604	26.1	N/A
UKIP	Rick Seal	599	25.9	N/A
UKIP	Phillip Trindall	520	22.4	N/A
Labour	Graham Parker	494	21.3	N/A
Independent	Nick Webb	325	14.0	N/A
Green	Peter Lang	286	12.3	N/A
Liberal Democrats	Sandra Tonge	173	7.5	N/A
Majority		133	5.7	N/A
Majority		94	4.1	N/A
Turnout		2,328	28.6	N/A
Rejected ballots		11	0.5	
Registered electors		8,129		
Conservative win (new seat)				
Conservative win (new seat)				

=== Carlton Colville ===
Carlton Colville (2 councillors)
Party	Candidate	Votes	%	±%
Conservative	Jenny Ceresa	777	37.3	N/A
Conservative	Craig Rivett	700	33.6	N/A
Liberal Democrats	Paul Light	606	29.1	N/A
Liberal Democrats	Adam Robertson	605	29.1	N/A
UKIP	Andrew Bols	441	21.2	N/A
Labour	David Finnigan	380	18.3	N/A
Labour	Louise Taylor	329	15.8	N/A
Majority		171	8.2	N/A
Majority		94	4.5	N/A
Turnout		2,084	27.2	N/A
Rejected ballots		5	0.2	
Registered electors		7,672		
Conservative win (new seat)				
Conservative win (new seat)				

=== Deben ===
Deben (1 councillor)
Party	Candidate	Votes	%	±%
Conservative	James Mallinder	722	47.6	N/A
Liberal Democrats	Peter Monk	318	21.0	N/A
Green	Aidan Semmens	280	18.5	N/A
UKIP	Garry Debenham	191	12.6	N/A
Majority		404	26.6	N/A
Turnout		1,524	41.0	N/A
Rejected ballots		7	0.5	
Registered electors		3,714		
Conservative win (new seat)				

=== Eastern Felixstowe ===
Eastern Felixstowe (3 councillors)
Party	Candidate	Votes	%	±%
Conservative	Steve Gallant	1,812	43.8	N/A
Conservative	Steve Wiles	1,656	40.0	N/A
Conservative	Mark Jepson	1,556	37.6	N/A
Liberal Democrats	Seamus Bennett	1,273	30.8	N/A
Liberal Democrats	Jan Candy	1,015	24.5	N/A
Liberal Democrats	Michael Ninnmey	974	23.5	N/A
Labour	David Rowe	887	21.4	N/A
Green	Kay Lyndle	883	21.3	N/A
Green	Lesley Bennett	838	20.3	N/A
Green	Jax Blunt	629	15.2	N/A
Majority		539	13.0	N/A
Majority		383	9.3	N/A
Majority		283	6.8	N/A
Turnout		4,216	39.2	N/A
Rejected ballots		80	1.9	
Registered electors		10,755		
Conservative win (new seat)				
Conservative win (new seat)				
Conservative win (new seat)				

==== Framlingham ====
Framlingham (2 councillors)
Party	Candidate	Votes	%	±%
Conservative	Maurice Cook	1,051	42.0	N/A
Conservative	William Taylor	985	39.4	N/A
Green	James Holloway	857	34.3	N/A
Liberal Democrats	Gary Kitching	723	28.9	N/A
Green	Beth Keys-Holloway	621	24.8	N/A
Labour	Lesley Bensley	391	15.6	N/A
Majority		194	7.8	N/A
Majority		130	5.2	N/A
Turnout		2,546	37.7	N/A
Rejected ballots		45	1.8	
Registered electors		6,754		
Conservative win (new seat)				
Conservative win (new seat)				

=== Gunton & St Margarets ===
Gunton & St Margarets (2 councillors)
Party	Candidate	Votes	%	±%
Conservative	Mary Rudd	802	34.0	N/A
Conservative	Linda Coulam	708	30.0	N/A
UKIP	Bernie Guymer	600	25.4	N/A
Labour	Malcolm Cherry	582	24.7	N/A
Green	David Youngman	553	23.4	N/A
UKIP	Mike Shaw	546	23.1	N/A
Labour	Nasima Begum	482	20.4	N/A
Majority		202	8.6	N/A
Majority		108	4.5	N/A
Turnout		2,376	30.0	N/A
Rejected ballots		17	0.7	
Registered electors		7,932		
Conservative win (new seat)				
Conservative win (new seat)				

=== Halesworth & Blything ===
Halesworth & Blything (2 councillors)
Party	Candidate	Votes	%	±%
Conservative	Alison Cackett	1,052	43.4	N/A
Conservative	Tony Goldson	1,038	42.8	N/A
Green	Kim Hoare	1,033	42.6	N/A
Liberal Democrats	Sarah Hunt	677	27.9	N/A
Labour	Peter Coghill	575	23.7	N/A
Majority		19	0.8	N/A
Majority		5	0.2	N/A
Turnout		2,468	36.8	N/A
Rejected ballots		44	1.8	
Registered electors		6,698		
Conservative win (new seat)				
Conservative win (new seat)				

=== Harbour & Normanston ===
Harbour & Normanston (3 councillors)
Party	Candidate	Votes	%	±%
Labour	Keith Patience	961	37.4	N/A
Labour	Janet Craig	928	36.1	N/A
Labour	Tess Gandy	910	35.4	N/A
UKIP	Marcus Crouch	552	21.5	N/A
UKIP	Patricia Hawes	529	20.6	N/A
Independent	Steve Ardley	469	18.2	N/A
UKIP	Lynn Oakley	453	17.6	N/A
Green	Emma Bateman	411	16.0	N/A
Conservative	Deanna Law	346	13.5	N/A
Independent	Tracey Eastwood	345	13.4	N/A
Conservative	Jean Bowry	330	12.8	N/A
Conservative	May Reader	297	11.6	N/A
Independent	Peter Knight	266	10.3	N/A
Independent	Mike Healy	194	7.5	N/A
Liberal Democrats	Janet Blowers O'Neill	119	4.6	N/A
Liberal Democrats	Tim Sutton-Day	102	4.0	N/A
Majority		409	15.9	N/A
Majority		376	14.6	N/A
Majority		358	13.9	N/A
Turnout		2,620	22.4	N/A
Rejected ballots		49	1.9	
Registered electors		11,715		
Labour win (new seat)				
Labour win (new seat)				
Labour win (new seat)				

=== Kelsale & Yoxford ===
Kelsale & Yoxford (1 councillor)
Party	Candidate	Votes	%	±%
Conservative	Stephen Burroughes	561	44.6	N/A
Green	Jeremy Adams	298	23.7	N/A
Liberal Democrats	Keith Dickerson	290	23.0	N/A
Independent	Peter Wilkinson	108	8.6	N/A
Majority		263	20.9	N/A
Turnout		1,279	38.7	N/A
Rejected ballots		20	1.6	
Registered electors		3,301		
Conservative win (new seat)				

=== Kesgrave ===
Kesgrave (3 councillors)
Party	Candidate	Votes	%	±%
Conservative	Debbie McCallum	2,004	59.9	N/A
Conservative	Stuart Lawson	1,643	49.1	N/A
Conservative	Geoff Lynch	1,585	47.3	N/A
Liberal Democrats	Sally Neal	786	23.5	N/A
Green	Tracy Watson Brown	734	21.9	N/A
Green	Martin Wilks	644	19.2	N/A
Labour	Julie Cuninghame	546	16.3	N/A
Labour	Helen Clarkson-Fieldsend	528	15.8	N/A
UKIP	Alistair Jeffreys	493	14.7	N/A
Majority		1,218	36.4	N/A
Majority		857	25.6	N/A
Majority		799	23.9	N/A
Turnout		3,363	29.3	N/A
Rejected ballots		15	0.4	
Registered electors		11,491		
Conservative win (new seat)				
Conservative win (new seat)				
Conservative win (new seat)				

=== Kessingland ===
Kessingland (1 councillor)
Party	Candidate	Votes	%	±%
Conservative	Letitia Smith	350	34.4	N/A
Labour	Alan Green	326	32.1	N/A
Green	Nicky Elliott	217	21.3	N/A
Liberal Democrats	David Gwynn	124	12.2	N/A
Majority		24	2.3	N/A
Turnout		1,064	29.4	N/A
Rejected ballots		47	4.4	
Registered electors		3,623		
Conservative win (new seat)				

=== Kirkley & Pakefield ===
Kirkley & Pakefield (3 councillors)
Party	Candidate	Votes	%	±%
Labour	Peter Byatt	1,086	36.4	N/A
Labour	Louise Gooch	1,080	36.2	N/A
Labour	Malcolm Pitchers	922	30.9	N/A
Conservative	Melanie Vigo di Gallidoro	857	28.7	N/A
Conservative	Jenna Meen	808	27.1	N/A
Conservative	June Ford	739	24.7	N/A
UKIP	Colin Bedson	722	24.2	N/A
UKIP	Robin Hinton	646	21.6	N/A
Green	Rosemary Brambley	637	21.3	N/A
Liberal Democrats	Christian Newsome	336	11.3	N/A
Liberal Democrats	David Hunt	241	8.1	N/A
Majority		229	7.7	N/A
Majority		223	7.5	N/A
Majority		65	2.2	N/A
Turnout		3,006	27.7	N/A
Rejected ballots		20	0.7	
Registered electors		10,842		
Labour win (new seat)				
Labour win (new seat)				
Labour win (new seat)				

=== Lothingland ===
Lothingland (1 councillor)
Party	Candidate	Votes	%	±%
Conservative	Paul Ashdown	449	48.1	N/A
Labour	Bob Groome	241	25.8	N/A
Green	Sally Phillips	173	18.5	N/A
Liberal Democrats	Fiona Shreeve	70	7.5	N/A
Majority		208	22.3	N/A
Turnout		958	32.5	N/A
Rejected ballots		25	2.6	
Registered electors		2,952		
Conservative win (new seat)				

=== Martlesham & Purdis Farm ===
Martlesham & Purdis Farm (2 councillors)
Party	Candidate	Votes	%	±%
Conservative	Chris Blundell	1,209	56.3	N/A
Liberal Democrats	Edward Thompson	955	44.5	N/A
Conservative	Patti Mulcahy	918	42.7	N/A
Green	Margaret Walsh	806	37.5	N/A
Majority		291	13.5	N/A
Majority		37	1.7	N/A
Turnout		2,175	34.1	N/A
Rejected ballots		27	1.2	
Registered electors		6,374		
Conservative win (new seat)				
Liberal Democrats win (new seat)				

=== Melton ===
Melton (1 councillor)
Party	Candidate	Votes	%	±%
Green	Rachel Smith-Lyte	933	59.9	N/A
Conservative	Jim Bidwell	624	40.1	N/A
Majority		309	19.8	N/A
Turnout		1,576	46.1	N/A
Rejected ballots		19	1.2	
Registered electors		3,422		
Green win (new seat)				

==== Orwell & Villages ====
Orwell & Villages (2 councillors)
Party	Candidate	Votes	%	±%
Conservative	Melissa Allen	1,179	38.8	N/A
Conservative	Richard Kerry	1,141	37.6	N/A
Independent	Sherrie Green	1,040	34.3	N/A
Independent	Stephen Wrinch	1,017	33.5	N/A
Green	Betsy Reid	694	22.9	N/A
Labour	Neville Mayes	459	15.1	N/A
Majority		139	4.6	N/A
Majority		101	3.3	N/A
Turnout		3,064	38.9	N/A
Rejected ballots		28	0.9	
Registered electors		7,881		
Conservative win (new seat)				
Conservative win (new seat)				

=== Oulton Broad ===
Oulton Broad (3 councillors)
Party	Candidate	Votes	%	±%
Conservative	Edward Back	1,214	39.7	N/A
Conservative	Keith Robinson	1,132	37.0	N/A
Conservative	Andree Gee	1,120	36.6	N/A
UKIP	Jenny Hinton	786	25.7	N/A
UKIP	George Hawes	739	24.2	N/A
Labour	Yvonne Cherry	702	23.0	N/A
Labour	Jack Smith	697	22.8	N/A
UKIP	Bert Poole	656	21.5	N/A
Labour	Jen Jones	643	21.0	N/A
Green	Josi Horne	367	12.0	N/A
Green	Nick Hoare	353	11.5	N/A
Liberal Democrats	Chris Thomas	291	9.5	N/A
Majority		428	14.0	N/A
Majority		346	11.3	N/A
Majority		334	10.9	N/A
Turnout		3,066	28.7	N/A
Rejected ballots		9	0.3	
Registered electors		10,692		
Conservative win (new seat)				
Conservative win (new seat)				
Conservative win (new seat)				

=== Rendlesham & Orford ===
Rendlesham & Orford (1 councillor)
Party	Candidate	Votes	%	±%
Conservative	Ray Herring	669	51.9	N/A
Green	Thomas Daly	273	21.2	N/A
Labour	Stephen Smedley	181	14.0	N/A
Liberal Democrats	Kit Twinch	166	12.9	N/A
Majority		396	30.7	N/A
Turnout		1,329	33.6	N/A
Rejected ballots		40	3.0	
Registered electors		3,957		
Conservative win (new seat)				

=== Rushmere St Andrew ===
Rushmere St Andrew (1 councillor)
Party	Candidate	Votes	%	±%
Conservative	Mark Newton	663	57.9	N/A
Green	Peter Ward	252	22.0	N/A
Labour	Anthony Meehan	230	20.1	N/A
Majority		411	35.9	N/A
Turnout		1,162	32.4	N/A
Rejected ballots		16	1.4	
Registered electors		3,585		
Conservative win (new seat)				

=== Saxmundham ===
Saxmundham (1 councillor)
Party	Candidate	Votes	%	±%
Independent	John Fisher	517	46.0	N/A
Conservative	Phillip Dunnett	305	27.2	N/A
Liberal Democrats	James Sandbach	301	26.8	N/A
Majority		212	18.8	N/A
Turnout		1,141	33.7	N/A
Rejected ballots		18	1.6	
Registered electors		3,384		
Independent win (new seat)				

=== Southwold ===
Southwold (1 councillor)
Party	Candidate	Votes	%	±%
Liberal Democrats	David Beavan	1,469	80.8	N/A
Conservative	Michael Ladd	282	15.5	N/A
Labour	John Cracknell	67	3.7	N/A
Majority		1,187	65.3	N/A
Turnout		1,834	56.2	N/A
Rejected ballots		16	0.9	
Registered electors		3,263		
Liberal Democrats win (new seat)				

=== Western Felixstowe ===
Western Felixstowe (3 councillors)
Party	Candidate	Votes	%	±%
Labour	Mike Deacon	1,022	42.3	N/A
Conservative	Stuart Bird	878	36.4	N/A
Conservative	Tracey Green	852	35.3	N/A
Labour	Margaret Morris	802	33.2	N/A
Conservative	Andy Smith	781	32.4	N/A
Labour	Mark Jones	714	29.6	N/A
Green	Jon Mulberg	501	20.8	N/A
Green	Kate Dickinson	471	19.5	N/A
Green	Nigel Hiley	382	15.8	N/A
Liberal Democrats	Lee Reeves	309	12.8	N/A
Majority		220	9.1	N/A
Majority		76	3.1	N/A
Majority		50	2.1	N/A
Turnout		2,491	28.0	N/A
Rejected ballots		77	3.1	
Registered electors		8,906		
Labour win (new seat)				
Conservative win (new seat)				
Conservative win (new seat)				

=== Wickham Market ===
Wickham Market (1 councillor)
Party	Candidate	Votes	%	±%
Conservative	Carol Poulter	686	47.1	N/A
Liberal Democrats	Jon James	343	23.6	N/A
Green	Peter James	251	17.3	N/A
Labour	Callum Paylor	175	12.0	N/A
Majority		343	23.5	N/A
Turnout		1,492	37.7	N/A
Rejected ballots		37	2.5	
Registered electors		3,953		
Conservative win (new seat)				

=== Woodbridge ===
Woodbridge (2 councillors)
Party	Candidate	Votes	%	±%
Liberal Democrats	Kay Yule	1,555	55.4	N/A
Conservative	Chris Mapey	1,070	38.1	N/A
Conservative	Geoff Holdcroft	1,036	36.9	N/A
Labour	Sharon Miller	1,035	36.9	N/A
Majority		519	18.5	N/A
Majority		34	1.2	N/A
Turnout		2,849	43.7	N/A
Rejected ballots		44	1.5	
Registered electors		6,525		
Liberal Democrats win (new seat)				
Conservative win (new seat)				

=== Wrentham, Wangford & Westleton ===
Wrentham, Wangford & Westleton (1 councillor)
Party	Candidate	Votes	%	±%
Conservative	Norman Brooks	474	35.4	N/A
Liberal Democrats	Andrew Turner	358	26.7	N/A
Green	Sarah Butt	316	23.6	N/A
Labour	Philip O'Hear	191	14.3	N/A
Majority		158	11.7	N/A
Turnout		1,366	39.2	N/A
Rejected ballots		27	2.0	
Registered electors		3,488		
Conservative win (new seat)				

== Changes 2019–2023 ==
Independent councillor Tony Cooper (Aldeburgh & Leiston) had joined the Conservative group by the time of the 2023 election, at which he stood as a Conservative candidate, having been elected in 2019 as an independent.

=== By-elections ===
==== Beccles and Worlingham ====
A by-election was held after Green councillor Graham Elliott stood down after 14 years to focus on a community pub project.

Beccles and Worlingham: 6 May 2021
Party	Candidate	Votes	%	±%
Green	Sarah Plummer	2,374	48.9	−16.1
Conservative	Mark Bee	2,062	42.5	+20.4
Labour	Dom Taylor	418	8.6	+3.9
Majority		312	6.4	−36.5
Turnout		4,854		
Green hold		Swing	▼18.3	

=== Framlingham ===
Framlingham: 6 May 2021
Party	Candidate	Votes	%	±%
Conservative	Lydia Freeman	1,508	52.7	+17.9
Green	Beth Keys-Holloway	1,036	36.2	+7.8
Labour	Paul Richards	318	11.1	−1.8
Majority		472	16.5	
Turnout		2,862		
Conservative hold		Swing	▲5.1	

=== Aldeburgh & Leiston ===
A by-election for two of the ward's three seats was held after Conservative councillors T-J Haworth-Culf and Jocelyn Bond both resigned. Haworth-Culf said she was concentrating on her Suffolk County Council seat, while Bond said the district council's pursuit of large-scale energy infrastructure projects such as Sizewell C made it harder for her to represent her communities' concerns.

Aldeburgh & Leiston: 8 July 2021
Party	Candidate	Votes	%	±%
Green	Thomas Daly	1,110	43.2	
Conservative	Russ Rainger	1,103	42.9	
Green	Matt Oakley	1,101	42.8	
Conservative	Andrew Reid	1,006	39.1	
Labour	Ian Ilett	355	13.8	
Labour	Mark Turner	311	12.1	
Communist	Steve Marsling	61	2.4	
Turnout		2,571	26.6	
Green gain from Conservative				
Conservative hold				

=== Orwell & Villages ===
Orwell & Villages: 12 August 2021
Party	Candidate	Votes	%	±%
Conservative	Mick Richardson	873	45.9	
Liberal Democrats	Michael Ninnmey	800	42.0	
Labour	David Rowe	230	12.1	
Majority		73	3.9	
Turnout		1,913	24.7	
Registered electors		7,744		
Conservative hold		Swing		
