= River Finn =

River Finn or Finn River may refer to two rivers in Ireland:

- River Finn (Foyle tributary) — mainly flows through County Donegal, into the River Foyle
- Finn River (County Fermanagh and County Monaghan) — a small river that flows into Upper Lough Erne

See also:

- River Fynn, a suffolk river that flows into the Deben
