= Listed buildings in Framlingham =

Civil Parish in Suffolk, England

Framlingham is a town and civil parish in the East Suffolk District of Suffolk, England. It contains 137 listed buildings that are recorded in the National Heritage List for England. Of these three are grade I, ten are grade II* and 124 are grade II.

This list is based on the information retrieved online from Historic England.

== Key ==
Grade	Criteria
I	Buildings that are of exceptional interest
II*	Particularly important buildings of more than special interest
II	Buildings that are of special interest

== Listing ==
Name	Grade	Location	Type	Completed (Note: The date given is the date used by Historic England as significant for the initial building or that of an important part in the structure's description.)	Date designated	Grid ref. (Note: The grid reference is based on the British national grid reference system, sometimes known as OSGB36, used by the Ordnance Survey.) Geo-coordinates	Notes	Entry number (Note: The "List Entry Number" is a unique number assigned to each listed building and scheduled monument by Historic England.)	Image	Wikidata
Gate Pier 100 Metres South of Parham House	II				18 December 1985	TM2991161827; 52°12′24″N 1°21′49″E		1030377	Upload Photo	Q26281666
Gate Piers 100 Metres South of Parham House	II				19 November 1984	TM2991261827; 52°12′24″N 1°21′49″E		1377307	Upload Photo	Q26657777
Barn at Parham House	II				18 December 1985	TM2981261894; 52°12′26″N 1°21′43″E		1377389	Upload Photo	Q26657856
Boundary Farmhouse	II				18 December 1985	TM3096264108; 52°13′36″N 1°22′49″E		1030376	Upload Photo	Q26281665
Framlingham Castle and Red House	I	IP13 9BP	castle		18 December 1985	TM2866663768; 52°13′29″N 1°20′48″E		1030383	Framlingham Castle and Red House More images	Q2524183
Framlingham War Memorial	II	IP13 9BD	war memorial		9 January 2018	TM2851963493; 52°13′20″N 1°20′39″E		1450100	Framlingham War Memorial More images	Q66479028
Poor House to Framlingham Castle	I	IP13 9BP	poorhouse		25 October 1951	TM2864863742; 52°13′28″N 1°20′47″E		1283709	Poor House to Framlingham Castle More images	Q90906374
Ancient House	II*	Albert Place	house		25 October 1951	TM2834563391; 52°13′17″N 1°20′30″E		1030378	Ancient House More images	Q17545891
Parish Pump Situated by Roadside on East Side of Albert Place	II	Albert Place			18 December 1985	TM2837063379; 52°13′16″N 1°20′31″E		1377390	Upload Photo	Q26657857
D'urbans Farmhouse	II	Apsey Green			25 October 1951	TM2708463227; 52°13′13″N 1°19′23″E		1377391	Upload Photo	Q26657858
Pitman's Grove	II	Apsey Green			18 December 1985	TM2638662841; 52°13′02″N 1°18′46″E		1030380	Upload Photo	Q26281668
Strawberry Fields	II	Apsey Green			18 December 1985	TM2731263359; 52°13′17″N 1°19′36″E		1030379	Upload Photo	Q26281667
Windwhistle Cottage	II	Apsey Green			18 December 1985	TM2733463205; 52°13′12″N 1°19′36″E		1283717	Upload Photo	Q26572548
Pillar Box at East End of Double Street, at Junction with Castle Street	II	At Junction With Castle Street, Double Street	pillar box		17 December 1974	TM2869963524; 52°13′21″N 1°20′49″E		1030366	Pillar Box at East End of Double Street, at Junction with Castle Street More images	Q26281653
Yew Tree House	II	1 and 2, Badingham Road			18 December 1985	TM2962064791; 52°14′00″N 1°21′40″E		1198694	Upload Photo	Q26494663
Culpho Farmhouse	II	Badingham Road			18 December 1985	TM3013764613; 52°13′54″N 1°22′07″E		1030381	Upload Photo	Q26281669
Garden Wall to the Side of Amadeus House, Bordering on the Churchyard	II	Bordering On The Churchyard, Church Street			18 December 1985	TM2850563478; 52°13′19″N 1°20′39″E		1283668	Upload Photo	Q26572503
Barn Adjacent to Castle Farmhouse	II	Brabling Green			18 December 1985	TM2901564500; 52°13′52″N 1°21′08″E		1198713	Upload Photo	Q26494681
Castle Farmhouse	II	Brabling Green			18 December 1985	TM2903064500; 52°13′52″N 1°21′09″E		1030382	Upload Photo	Q26281670
Lower Barn Immediately South-west of Whitehouse Farmhouse	II	Brabling Green			3 April 1991	TM2928064603; 52°13′55″N 1°21′22″E		1030341	Upload Photo	Q26281628
Merriewinds	II	Brabling Green			18 December 1985	TM2941964698; 52°13′58″N 1°21′30″E		1198701	Upload Photo	Q26494670
White House Farmhouse	II	Brabling Green			18 December 1985	TM2930364613; 52°13′55″N 1°21′23″E		1377353	Upload Photo	Q26657822
17 and 19, Bridge Street	II	17 and 19, Bridge Street			25 October 1951	TM2840463513; 52°13′21″N 1°20′33″E		1198722	17 and 19, Bridge Street More images	Q26494688
Unitarian Chapel	II*	Bridge Street	chapel		7 December 1966	TM2842363519; 52°13′21″N 1°20′34″E		1377354	Unitarian Chapel More images	Q17546639
Lincoln's Barn	II	Brook Lane			18 December 1985	TM2740663471; 52°13′21″N 1°19′41″E		1283699	Upload Photo	Q26572533
4 and 6 Castle Street	II	4, Castle Street, IP13 9BS			25 October 1951	TM2863063538; 52°13′21″N 1°20′45″E		1030386	4 and 6 Castle Street More images	Q26281675
Castle Cottage	II	7, Castle Street			25 October 1951	TM2867263541; 52°13′21″N 1°20′48″E		1377355	Castle Cottage More images	Q26657823
8 Castle Street	II	8, Castle Street, IP13 9BS			25 October 1951	TM2864463534; 52°13′21″N 1°20′46″E		1198785	8 Castle Street More images	Q26494748
9, Castle Street	II	9, Castle Street			25 October 1951	TM2867863540; 52°13′21″N 1°20′48″E		1030384	9, Castle Street More images	Q26281672
10 and 12 Castle Street	II	10, Castle Street, IP13 9BS			25 October 1951	TM2865763533; 52°13′21″N 1°20′47″E		1030387	10 and 12 Castle Street More images	Q26281676
11, Castle Street	II	11, Castle Street			25 October 1951	TM2868363539; 52°13′21″N 1°20′48″E		1198766	11, Castle Street More images	Q26494730
14 and 16 Castle Street	II	14, Castle Street, IP13 9BS			25 October 1951	TM2867363531; 52°13′21″N 1°20′48″E		1198788	14 and 16 Castle Street More images	Q26494751
20 and 22 Castle Street	II	20, Castle Street, IP13 9BS			25 October 1951	TM2868963527; 52°13′21″N 1°20′48″E		1030388	20 and 22 Castle Street More images	Q26281677
23, Castle Street	II	23, Castle Street			25 October 1951	TM2871463540; 52°13′21″N 1°20′50″E		1030385	23, Castle Street More images	Q26281673
27, Castle Street	II	27, Castle Street			25 October 1951	TM2872363542; 52°13′21″N 1°20′50″E		1283677	27, Castle Street More images	Q26572512
28, Castle Street	II	28, Castle Street			25 October 1951	TM2873863522; 52°13′21″N 1°20′51″E		1030389	Upload Photo	Q26281678
The Readery	II	29, Castle Street			25 October 1951	TM2873863543; 52°13′21″N 1°20′51″E		1377356	The Readery More images	Q26657824
Stanford House	II	30, Castle Street			25 October 1951	TM2874863489; 52°13′19″N 1°20′51″E		1198794	Upload Photo	Q26494755
Haynings	II*	38, Castle Street			25 October 1951	TM2878363512; 52°13′20″N 1°20′53″E		1198801	Upload Photo	Q17546365
Garden Wall on the West Side of Number 38 (haynings)	II	Castle Street			18 December 1985	TM2876863528; 52°13′21″N 1°20′53″E		1030390	Upload Photo	Q26281680
Moat House	II	Castle Street			18 December 1985	TM2875663547; 52°13′21″N 1°20′52″E		1198780	Moat House More images	Q26494743
Amadeus House	II	2, Church Street			25 October 1951	TM2852163453; 52°13′19″N 1°20′39″E		1030393	Upload Photo	Q26281682
4 Bollards at the South West Corner of the Churchyard	II	4 Bollards At The South West Corner Of The Churchyard, Church Street			18 December 1985	TM2848763493; 52°13′20″N 1°20′38″E		1377357	Upload Photo	Q26657825
Former Midland Bank	II	5, Church Street			25 October 1951	TM2855563455; 52°13′19″N 1°20′41″E		1377377	Former Midland Bank More images	Q26657844
6, Church Street	II	6, Church Street			18 December 1985	TM2857663472; 52°13′19″N 1°20′42″E		1030352	6, Church Street More images	Q26281639
Regency House	II*	7, Church Street	house		25 October 1951	TM2858063485; 52°13′20″N 1°20′43″E		1030353	Regency House More images	Q17545876
8 and 9, Church Street	II	8 and 9, Church Street			25 October 1951	TM2858563495; 52°13′20″N 1°20′43″E		1377378	8 and 9, Church Street More images	Q26657845
Church of St Michael the Archangel	I	Church Street	church building		7 December 1966	TM2853863508; 52°13′20″N 1°20′40″E		1030391	Church of St Michael the Archangel More images	Q5117639
Conservative Club	II	Church Street	building		25 October 1951	TM2860063516; 52°13′21″N 1°20′44″E		1030354	Conservative Club More images	Q26281640
Crown and Anchor Hotel	II	Church Street	hotel		25 October 1951	TM2854563445; 52°13′18″N 1°20′41″E		1283639	Crown and Anchor Hotel More images	Q26572475
Gate Piers and Railings at the Eastern Entrance to the Churchyard	II	Church Street			18 December 1985	TM2855963484; 52°13′20″N 1°20′41″E		1283662	Upload Photo	Q26572497
Premises of the Co-operative Wholesale Society	II	Church Street			7 December 1966	TM2853263435; 52°13′18″N 1°20′40″E		1377358	Premises of the Co-operative Wholesale Society More images	Q26657826
St Michael's Close	II	1-5, Church Lane (off The Churchyard)			25 October 1951	TM2849963528; 52°13′21″N 1°20′38″E		1030392	St Michael's Close More images	Q26281681
The Old Tithe Barn	II	Church Street (off The Churchyard)			9 January 1985	TM2844763551; 52°13′22″N 1°20′36″E		1198836	Upload Photo	Q26494795
Edward's Farmhouse	II	Coles Green			18 December 1985	TM2931362565; 52°12′49″N 1°21′19″E		1377379	Upload Photo	Q26657846
Manor Farmhouse	II	Coles Green			18 December 1985	TM2899562142; 52°12′36″N 1°21′01″E		1030355	Upload Photo	Q26281641
39-41, College Road	II	39-41, College Road			14 November 2001	TM2810263519; 52°13′21″N 1°20′18″E		1389491	Upload Photo	Q26668925
Chapel to Framlingham College	II	College Road			18 December 1985	TM2819963953; 52°13′35″N 1°20′24″E		1377380	Upload Photo	Q26657847
Framlingham College	II	College Road	boarding school		18 December 1985	TM2815063961; 52°13′36″N 1°20′21″E		1030356	Framlingham College More images	Q5478036
Statue of Prince Albert at Framlingham College	II	College Road			18 December 1985	TM2815563939; 52°13′35″N 1°20′21″E		1030357	Upload Photo	Q26281642
Framlingham Hall Cottages	II	1 and 2, Dennington Road			18 December 1985	TM2802666059; 52°14′44″N 1°20′20″E		1377382	Upload Photo	Q26657849
Barn Adjacent to Oak Farmhouse	II	Dennington Road			18 December 1985	TM2740965129; 52°14′14″N 1°19′45″E		1198899	Upload Photo	Q26494861
Charnwood	II	Dennington Road			18 December 1985	TM2725864472; 52°13′53″N 1°19′35″E		1283653	Upload Photo	Q26572488
Dairy Cottage	II	Dennington Road			18 December 1985	TM2762265978; 52°14′42″N 1°19′58″E		1030359	Upload Photo	Q26281646
Framlingham Hall	II	Dennington Road			25 October 1951	TM2785566054; 52°14′44″N 1°20′11″E		1198905	Upload Photo	Q26494867
Grange Farmhouse	II	Dennington Road			18 December 1985	TM2720364741; 52°14′02″N 1°19′33″E		1377381	Upload Photo	Q26657848
Highfield	II	Dennington Road			18 December 1985	TM2788064892; 52°14′06″N 1°20′09″E		1030358	Upload Photo	Q26281645
Ivy House	II	Dennington Road			18 December 1985	TM2839765912; 52°14′38″N 1°20′39″E		1283621	Upload Photo	Q26572460
2 and 4, Double Street	II	2 and 4, Double Street			25 October 1951	TM2858163454; 52°13′19″N 1°20′43″E		1377384	2 and 4, Double Street More images	Q26657851
6, 8 and 10, Double Street	II	6, 8 and 10, Double Street			25 October 1951	TM2860263449; 52°13′18″N 1°20′44″E		1030362	6, 8 and 10, Double Street More images	Q26281649
9, Double Street	II	9, Double Street			25 October 1951	TM2861263461; 52°13′19″N 1°20′44″E		1030360	9, Double Street More images	Q26281647
11, Double Street	II	11, Double Street			18 December 1985	TM2863563466; 52°13′19″N 1°20′45″E		1198918	11, Double Street More images	Q26494881
Gable Cottage	II	12, Double Street			25 October 1951	TM2860963436; 52°13′18″N 1°20′44″E		1283558	Upload Photo	Q26572400
14 and 16, Double Street	II	14 and 16, Double Street			25 October 1951	TM2862263447; 52°13′18″N 1°20′45″E		1030363	14 and 16, Double Street More images	Q26281650
19 and 21, Double Street	II	19 and 21, Double Street			18 December 1985	TM2866263479; 52°13′19″N 1°20′47″E		1377383	19 and 21, Double Street More images	Q26657850
20, Double Street	II	20, Double Street			25 October 1951	TM2863763450; 52°13′18″N 1°20′45″E		1283561	20, Double Street More images	Q26572403
Northwold	II	22, Double Street			25 October 1951	TM2865263453; 52°13′18″N 1°20′46″E		1377385	Northwold More images	Q26657853
23 and 25, Double Street	II	23 and 25, Double Street			18 December 1985	TM2867463490; 52°13′20″N 1°20′48″E		1283586	23 and 25, Double Street More images	Q26572426
24, Double Street	II	24, Double Street			25 October 1951	TM2866263456; 52°13′19″N 1°20′47″E		1283566	24, Double Street More images	Q26572408
26, Double Street	II	26, Double Street			25 October 1951	TM2866963461; 52°13′19″N 1°20′47″E		1030364	26, Double Street More images	Q26281651
28 and 30, Double Street	II	28 and 30, Double Street			18 December 1985	TM2867863470; 52°13′19″N 1°20′48″E		1283569	28 and 30, Double Street More images	Q26572411
29, Double Street	II	29, Double Street			18 December 1985	TM2868663502; 52°13′20″N 1°20′48″E		1030361	29, Double Street More images	Q26281648
31 and 33, Double Street	II	31 and 33, Double Street			18 December 1985	TM2869363514; 52°13′20″N 1°20′49″E		1199014	31 and 33, Double Street More images	Q26494934
East Gables	II	42, Double Street			18 December 1985	TM2870763503; 52°13′20″N 1°20′49″E		1030365	East Gables More images	Q26281652
Hare and Hounds Public House	II	Double Street			25 October 1951	TM2871163524; 52°13′21″N 1°20′50″E		1199063	Hare and Hounds Public House More images	Q26494980
2, Fairfield Road	II	2, Fairfield Road			25 October 1951	TM2853063356; 52°13′16″N 1°20′40″E		1283537	Upload Photo	Q26572380
4, Fairfield Road	II	4, Fairfield Road			18 December 1985	TM2853163348; 52°13′15″N 1°20′40″E		1030368	Upload Photo	Q26281656
6, Fairfield Road	II	6, Fairfield Road			25 October 1951	TM2852763344; 52°13′15″N 1°20′39″E		1199077	Upload Photo	Q26494991
Amadeus House Workshop	II	Fairfield Road			18 December 1985	TM2853263363; 52°13′16″N 1°20′40″E		1030367	Upload Photo	Q26281655
Fairfield Hall	II	Fairfield Road			25 October 1951	TM2851363247; 52°13′12″N 1°20′38″E		1199085	Upload Photo	Q26494999
Fairfield House	II*	Fairfield Road			25 October 1951	TM2851363257; 52°13′12″N 1°20′38″E		1030369	Upload Photo	Q17545883
29, Fore Street	II	29, Fore Street			18 December 1985	TM2859463388; 52°13′16″N 1°20′43″E		1030371	Upload Photo	Q26281658
The Maltings	II	Fore Street			18 December 1985	TM2843063371; 52°13′16″N 1°20′34″E		1030370	Upload Photo	Q26281657
United Reformed Church	II	Fore Street			18 December 1985	TM2846263377; 52°13′16″N 1°20′36″E		1199093	Upload Photo	Q26495007
The Grove	II*	Kettleburgh Road			7 December 1966	TM2833961152; 52°12′05″N 1°20′24″E		1199099	Upload Photo	Q17546375
The Woodlands	II	Kettleburgh Road			18 December 1985	TM2812860934; 52°11′58″N 1°20′13″E		1377386	Upload Photo	Q26657854
Gatewood Farmhouse	II	Lampardbrook			18 December 1985	TM2753261847; 52°12′28″N 1°19′43″E		1377387	Upload Photo	Q26657855
Lampardbrook Farmhouse	II	Lampardbrook			18 December 1985	TM2785462172; 52°12′38″N 1°20′01″E		1030372	Upload Photo	Q26281659
Lampards Farmhouse	II	Lampardbrook			18 December 1985	TM2749262047; 52°12′35″N 1°19′42″E		1199113	Upload Photo	Q26495023
2 and 4, Market Hill	II	2 and 4, Market Hill			18 December 1985	TM2846263482; 52°13′20″N 1°20′36″E		1199114	2 and 4, Market Hill More images	Q26495024
Flamingo	II	6, Market Hill			18 December 1985	TM2844263477; 52°13′20″N 1°20′35″E		1030373	Upload Photo	Q26281660
8, 9 and 10, Market Hill	II	8, 9 and 10, Market Hill			25 October 1951	TM2844263467; 52°13′19″N 1°20′35″E		1199134	Upload Photo	Q26495041
11, Market Hill	II	11, Market Hill			25 October 1951	TM2844263448; 52°13′19″N 1°20′35″E		1030330	11, Market Hill More images	Q26281614
12, Market Hill	II	12, Market Hill			25 October 1951	TM2844263441; 52°13′18″N 1°20′35″E		1377406	Upload Photo	Q26657870
The Hill House	II	13, Market Hill			25 October 1951	TM2844563433; 52°13′18″N 1°20′35″E		1199143	The Hill House More images	Q26495047
14, Market Hill	II	14, Market Hill			18 December 1985	TM2844863424; 52°13′18″N 1°20′35″E		1030331	14, Market Hill More images	Q26281615
16, Market Hill	II	16, Market Hill	building		18 December 1985	TM2845163416; 52°13′18″N 1°20′36″E		1199149	16, Market Hill More images	Q26495052
25 and 26, Market Hill	II	25 and 26, Market Hill			25 October 1951	TM2847363409; 52°13′17″N 1°20′37″E		1030332	Upload Photo	Q26281618
31, Market Hill	II	31, Market Hill			18 December 1985	TM2852563424; 52°13′18″N 1°20′40″E		1198855	31, Market Hill More images	Q26494814
32, Market Hill	II	32, Market Hill			25 October 1951	TM2851663446; 52°13′18″N 1°20′39″E		1377407	32, Market Hill More images	Q26657871
33 and 33a, Market Hill	II	33 and 33a, Market Hill			25 October 1951	TM2850163448; 52°13′19″N 1°20′38″E		1199185	33 and 33a, Market Hill More images	Q26495085
The Guildhall	II*	34, Market Hill			25 October 1951	TM2848363460; 52°13′19″N 1°20′37″E		1030333	Upload Photo	Q17545871
Crown Hotel	II	Market Hill	hotel		25 October 1951	TM2850063416; 52°13′17″N 1°20′38″E		1199171	Crown Hotel More images	Q26495072
K6 Telephone Kiosk	II	Market Hill			5 October 1987	TM2846463469; 52°13′19″N 1°20′36″E		1377374	K6 Telephone Kiosk More images	Q26657841
Premises of Messrs Carley and Webb (grocers) Premises of Messrs Carley and Webb (wine Shop)	II	Market Hill			18 December 1985	TM2852163400; 52°13′17″N 1°20′39″E		1030394	Premises of Messrs Carley and Webb (grocers) Premises of Messrs Carley and Webb (wine Shop) More images	Q26281683
Pillar Box at Junction Between Mount Pleasant and College Road	II	Mount Pleasant	pillar box		17 December 1974	TM2806263594; 52°13′24″N 1°20′16″E		1199196	Pillar Box at Junction Between Mount Pleasant and College Road More images	Q26495096
Masonic Hall	II	New Road			25 October 1951	TM2824663538; 52°13′22″N 1°20′25″E		1030334	Upload Photo	Q26281619
Sir Robert Hitcham's Almshouses	II*	New Road	almshouse		25 October 1951	TM2825563503; 52°13′21″N 1°20′26″E		1377408	Sir Robert Hitcham's Almshouses More images	Q17546673
New Street Farmhouse	II	New Street			18 December 1985	TM2667063849; 52°13′34″N 1°19′03″E		1283481	Upload Photo	Q26572327
Barn at Moat Farm	II	Saxmundham Road			18 December 1985	TM2968463479; 52°13′18″N 1°21′41″E		1199219	Upload Photo	Q26495118
Hatherleigh Farmhouse	II	Saxmundham Road			18 December 1985	TM3018463597; 52°13′21″N 1°22′07″E		1377409	Upload Photo	Q26657872
Moat Farmhouse	II	Saxmundham Road			18 December 1985	TM2970863470; 52°13′17″N 1°21′42″E		1030335	Upload Photo	Q26281621
Rookery Farmhouse	II	Saxmundham Road			18 December 1985	TM3038563264; 52°13′10″N 1°22′17″E		1199228	Upload Photo	Q26495127
Rawlings Cottages	II	Saxtead Road			18 December 1985	TM2729164054; 52°13′40″N 1°19′36″E		1377410	Upload Photo	Q26657873
Rose Farmhouse	II	Saxtead Road			18 December 1985	TM2693064731; 52°14′02″N 1°19′19″E		1199237	Upload Photo	Q26495135
Saxtead Lodge	II	Saxtead Road			18 December 1985	TM2659264404; 52°13′52″N 1°19′00″E		1030336	Upload Photo	Q26281622
Garden House	II*	Station Road			25 October 1951	TM2836363249; 52°13′12″N 1°20′31″E		1377411	Upload Photo	Q17546682
Pump in Front of the Mills Almshouses	II	Station Road			18 December 1985	TM2834563313; 52°13′14″N 1°20′30″E		1030337	Upload Photo	Q26281623
Round House	II	Station Road			25 October 1951	TM2832363130; 52°13′09″N 1°20′28″E		1030338	Upload Photo	Q26281624
Thomas Mills Almshouses	II*	Station Road			25 October 1951	TM2833763312; 52°13′14″N 1°20′29″E		1199250	Upload Photo	Q17546380
Tomb House	II	Station Road			7 December 1966	TM2837563241; 52°13′12″N 1°20′31″E		1199260	Upload Photo	Q26495154
Hill Farmhouse	II	Victoria Mill Road			18 December 1985	TM2786562551; 52°12′50″N 1°20′03″E		1199266	Upload Photo	Q26495159
Red House Farmhouse	II	Victoria Mill Road			25 October 1951	TM2745862807; 52°12′59″N 1°19′42″E		1030339	Upload Photo	Q26281625
17 and 19, Wellclose Square	II	17 and 19, Wellclose Square			18 December 1985	TM2830663433; 52°13′18″N 1°20′28″E		1199272	Upload Photo	Q26495164
23, Wellclose Square	II	23, Wellclose Square			18 December 1985	TM2829363440; 52°13′19″N 1°20′27″E		1377373	23, Wellclose Square More images	Q26657840
White Horse Inn	II	Wellclose Square	inn		18 December 1985	TM2827363437; 52°13′19″N 1°20′26″E		1199279	White Horse Inn More images	Q26495170
Broadwater	II	Woodbridge Road			25 October 1951	TM2900761606; 52°12′18″N 1°21′00″E		1030340	Upload Photo	Q26281627

== See also ==
- Grade I listed buildings in Suffolk
- Grade II* listed buildings in Suffolk

== Sources ==
- Bettely, James; Pevsner, Nikolaus (2015) [1961], Suffolk: East, The Buildings of England, New Haven and London: Yale University Press, ISBN 978-0-300-19654-2
