= Listed buildings in Beccles =

Civil Parish in Suffolk, England

Beccles is a town and civil parish in the East Suffolk district of Suffolk, England. It contains 149 listed buildings that are recorded in the National Heritage List for England. Of these six are grade I, two are grade II* and 141 are grade II.

This list is based on the information retrieved online from Historic England.

== Key ==
Grade	Criteria
I	Buildings that are of exceptional interest
II*	Particularly important buildings of more than special interest
II	Buildings that are of special interest

== Listing ==
Name	Grade	Location	Type	Completed (Note: The date given is the date used by Historic England as significant for the initial building or that of an important part in the structure's description.)	Date designated	Grid ref. (Note: The grid reference is based on the British national grid reference system, sometimes known as OSGB36, used by the Ordnance Survey.) Geo-coordinates	Notes	Entry number (Note: The "List Entry Number" is a unique number assigned to each listed building and scheduled monument by Historic England.)	Image	Wikidata
6 Market Street	II	6 Market Street, NR34 9AQ			22 September 1971	TM4223390407; 52°27′28″N 1°33′51″E		1186915	Upload Photo	Q26482157
Montagu House and Montagu Lodge	II	62 and 62a Northgate, NR34 9AU			16 March 1948	TM4219590901; 52°27′44″N 1°33′50″E		1186933	Upload Photo	Q26482175
Church of St Michael	I		church building		16 March 1948	TM4209590482; 52°27′31″N 1°33′43″E		1186885	Church of St Michael More images	Q17527371
Detached Tower of Church of St Michael	I		bell tower		16 March 1948	TM4212590453; 52°27′30″N 1°33′45″E		1298972	Detached Tower of Church of St Michael More images	Q4878534
Retaining Walls of Churchyard of Church of St Michael	II				22 September 1971	TM4204390481; 52°27′31″N 1°33′41″E		1186886	Upload Photo	Q26482127
2, Ballygate	II	2, Ballygate			22 September 1971	TM4208990367; 52°27′27″N 1°33′43″E		1298977	Upload Photo	Q26586410
3, Ballygate	II	3, Ballygate			22 September 1971	TM4210090329; 52°27′26″N 1°33′43″E		1298973	Upload Photo	Q26586406
4, Ballygate	II	4, Ballygate			22 September 1971	TM4208590354; 52°27′27″N 1°33′43″E		1280768	Upload Photo	Q26569860
Angel House	II	5, Ballygate			22 September 1971	TM4210490322; 52°27′26″N 1°33′43″E		1186887	Upload Photo	Q26482128
6 and 8, Ballygate	II	6 and 8, Ballygate			22 September 1971	TM4208290351; 52°27′27″N 1°33′42″E		1186893	Upload Photo	Q26482134
Crown and Anchor Public House	II	7, Ballygate	pub		22 September 1971	TM4208990309; 52°27′25″N 1°33′43″E		1298974	Crown and Anchor Public House More images	Q26586407
10, 12 and 14, Ballygate	II	10, 12 and 14, Ballygate			22 September 1971	TM4207990336; 52°27′26″N 1°33′42″E		1186894	Upload Photo	Q26482135
11-17, Ballygate	II	11-17, Ballygate			22 September 1971	TM4207190283; 52°27′25″N 1°33′42″E		1186888	Upload Photo	Q26482129
18, Ballygate	II	18, Ballygate			22 September 1971	TM4205890303; 52°27′25″N 1°33′41″E		1280744	Upload Photo	Q26569839
19 and 21, Ballygate	II	19 and 21, Ballygate			22 September 1971	TM4206990281; 52°27′24″N 1°33′42″E		1186889	Upload Photo	Q26482130
20, Ballygate	II	20, Ballygate			22 September 1971	TM4205290298; 52°27′25″N 1°33′41″E		1186895	Upload Photo	Q26482136
Cameron House	II	23, Ballygate			22 September 1971	TM4206890261; 52°27′24″N 1°33′41″E		1298975	Upload Photo	Q26586408
Waveney View	II	25, Ballygate			16 March 1948	TM4205090258; 52°27′24″N 1°33′40″E		1186890	Upload Photo	Q26482131
Ballygate House	II	27, Ballygate			16 March 1948	TM4203790246; 52°27′23″N 1°33′40″E		1298976	Upload Photo	Q26586409
The Rectory	II	29, Ballygate			16 March 1948	TM4202790221; 52°27′23″N 1°33′39″E		1186891	Upload Photo	Q26482132
39, Ballygate	II	39, Ballygate			22 September 1971	TM4195790132; 52°27′20″N 1°33′35″E		1186892	Upload Photo	Q26482133
Leman House	I	Ballygate			16 March 1948	TM4195090153; 52°27′21″N 1°33′35″E		1205376	Upload Photo	Q17626609
St Mary's House (now Flats) and Former Stables to North East of St Mary's House	II	Ballygate			22 September 1971	TM4186290078; 52°27′18″N 1°33′30″E		1186896	Upload Photo	Q26482137
Range of Outbuildings to the North of Roos Hall	II	Barsham Road			22 September 1971	TM4148690044; 52°27′18″N 1°33′10″E		1186897	Upload Photo	Q26482138
3, Blyburgate	II	3, Blyburgate			22 September 1971	TM4225490296; 52°27′25″N 1°33′51″E		1205428	Upload Photo	Q26500769
4, 4a and 6, Blyburgate	II	4, 4a and 6, Blyburgate			22 September 1971	TM4225890276; 52°27′24″N 1°33′52″E		1298980	Upload Photo	Q26586413
17, Blyburgate	II	17, Blyburgate			22 September 1971	TM4230090266; 52°27′24″N 1°33′54″E		1205443	Upload Photo	Q26500782
19, Blyburgate	II	19, Blyburgate			22 September 1971	TM4230290258; 52°27′23″N 1°33′54″E		1186899	Upload Photo	Q26482141
21, Blyburgate	II	21, Blyburgate			22 September 1971	TM4231190249; 52°27′23″N 1°33′54″E		1298978	Upload Photo	Q26586411
22, Blyburgate	II	22, Blyburgate			22 September 1971	TM4230290224; 52°27′22″N 1°33′54″E		1186903	Upload Photo	Q26482145
23, Blyburgate	II	23, Blyburgate			22 September 1971	TM4231590227; 52°27′22″N 1°33′54″E		1280706	Upload Photo	Q26569809
25, Blyburgate	II	25, Blyburgate			22 September 1971	TM4232890212; 52°27′22″N 1°33′55″E		1186900	Upload Photo	Q26482142
27 and 29, Blyburgate	II	27 and 29, Blyburgate			22 September 1971	TM4233590204; 52°27′22″N 1°33′55″E		1298979	Upload Photo	Q26586412
28 and 30, Blyburgate	II	28 and 30, Blyburgate			22 September 1971	TM4231590208; 52°27′22″N 1°33′54″E		1298981	Upload Photo	Q26586414
32, Blyburgate	II	32, Blyburgate			22 September 1971	TM4232090200; 52°27′21″N 1°33′55″E		1186904	Upload Photo	Q26482146
33, Blyburgate	II	33, Blyburgate			22 September 1971	TM4236090176; 52°27′21″N 1°33′57″E		1280708	Upload Photo	Q26569811
34, Blyburgate	II	34, Blyburgate			22 September 1971	TM4233090186; 52°27′21″N 1°33′55″E		1298982	Upload Photo	Q26586415
37 and 39, Blyburgate	II	37 and 39, Blyburgate			22 September 1971	TM4237290165; 52°27′20″N 1°33′57″E		1186901	Upload Photo	Q26482143
40, Blyburgate	II	40, Blyburgate			22 September 1971	TM4234690170; 52°27′20″N 1°33′56″E		1186905	Upload Photo	Q26482147
Kilbrack	II	Blyburgate			16 March 1948	TM4247790052; 52°27′16″N 1°34′03″E		1280712	Upload Photo	Q26569815
Number 2 (the Corner Shop) Including Premises Occupied by Dr R Grey (optician) and Premises Occupied by Kay's Restaurant	II	Blyburgate			22 September 1971	TM4223690289; 52°27′24″N 1°33′50″E		1186902	Upload Photo	Q26482144
Numbers 5-11 and 11a Blyburgate	II	11a, Blyburgate			22 September 1971	TM4226790284; 52°27′24″N 1°33′52″E		1186898	Upload Photo	Q26482140
Roos Hall	I	Bungay Road, NR34 8HE	house		16 March 1948	TM4151190036; 52°27′17″N 1°33′11″E		1280729	Roos Hall More images	Q7366382
1, Exchange Square	II	1, Exchange Square			5 June 1973	TM4224890304; 52°27′25″N 1°33′51″E		1261812	Upload Photo	Q26552736
2 and 4, Exchange Square	II	2 and 4, Exchange Square			22 September 1971	TM4224490312; 52°27′25″N 1°33′51″E		1298983	Upload Photo	Q26586416
K6 Telephone Kiosk Adjacent to Post Office (not Included)	II	Exchange Square			15 February 1990	TM4223390362; 52°27′27″N 1°33′50″E		1298968	Upload Photo	Q26586403
Premises Occupied by Gordon Daliston (adjoining to North of Lloyds Bank	II	Exchange Square			22 September 1971	TM4221090338; 52°27′26″N 1°33′49″E		1186907	Upload Photo	Q26482149
Premises Occupied by Lloyds Bank	II	Exchange Square	architectural structure		22 September 1971	TM4221690328; 52°27′26″N 1°33′49″E		1298984	Premises Occupied by Lloyds Bank More images	Q26586417
Premises Occupied by Pryce (adjoining to South of Lloyds Bank)	II	Exchange Square			22 September 1971	TM4222090318; 52°27′25″N 1°33′50″E		1186908	Upload Photo	Q26482150
Twyford House	II	Exchange Square			22 September 1971	TM4224790327; 52°27′26″N 1°33′51″E		1186906	Upload Photo	Q26482148
2, Hungate	II	2, Hungate			22 September 1971	TM4222090298; 52°27′25″N 1°33′50″E		1186909	Upload Photo	Q26482151
4, Hungate	II	4, Hungate			22 September 1971	TM4221990288; 52°27′24″N 1°33′49″E		1298985	Upload Photo	Q26586418
6, Hungate	II	6, Hungate			22 September 1971	TM4221590270; 52°27′24″N 1°33′49″E		1205558	Upload Photo	Q26500892
8, Hungate	II	8, Hungate			22 September 1971	TM4221490262; 52°27′24″N 1°33′49″E		1186910	Upload Photo	Q26482152
10, Hungate	II	10, Hungate			22 September 1971	TM4221490255; 52°27′23″N 1°33′49″E		1280644	Upload Photo	Q26569755
14, Hungate	II	14, Hungate			22 September 1971	TM4221390234; 52°27′23″N 1°33′49″E		1298986	Upload Photo	Q26586419
16 and 18, Hungate	II	16 and 18, Hungate			22 September 1971	TM4221590221; 52°27′22″N 1°33′49″E		1186911	Upload Photo	Q26482153
20 and 20a, Hungate	II	20 and 20a, Hungate			22 September 1971	TM4221790207; 52°27′22″N 1°33′49″E		1205584	Upload Photo	Q26500914
22, Hungate	II	22, Hungate			22 September 1971	TM4221790183; 52°27′21″N 1°33′49″E		1298987	Upload Photo	Q26586420
St Denys	II	24 and 26, Hungate			22 September 1971	TM4222090176; 52°27′21″N 1°33′49″E		1186912	Upload Photo	Q26482154
Congregational Church	II	Hungate	church building		22 September 1971	TM4224090256; 52°27′23″N 1°33′51″E		1205600	Congregational Church More images	Q26500924
Serpentine Wall	II	Hungate, Midmeadow			6 September 1971	TM4212190257; 52°27′24″N 1°33′44″E		1186913	Upload Photo	Q26482155
Hungate House	II	12, Hungate Lane			22 September 1971	TM4211490278; 52°27′24″N 1°33′44″E		1280605	Upload Photo	Q26569721
The Grove	II	68, Ingate Street			16 March 1948	TM4284189856; 52°27′09″N 1°34′21″E		1298988	Upload Photo	Q26586421
Beccles War Memorial	II	Junction Of Priory Road, Waveney, NR34 9NG			15 January 2019	TM4202589967; 52°27′14″N 1°33′38″E		1461532	Upload Photo	Q60656275
2, London Road	II	2, London Road			22 September 1971	TM4222090149; 52°27′20″N 1°33′49″E		1186914	Upload Photo	Q26482156
The Old National School	II	Newgate			3 September 2001	TM4225890502; 52°27′31″N 1°33′52″E		1389416	Upload Photo	Q26668850
National Provincial Bank	II	1, Newmarket			22 September 1971	TM4220590345; 52°27′26″N 1°33′49″E		1205674	Upload Photo	Q26500984
2, Newmarket	II	2, Newmarket			22 September 1971	TM4220690370; 52°27′27″N 1°33′49″E		1186922	Upload Photo	Q26482164
Midland Bank	II	3, Newmarket			22 September 1971	TM4219690349; 52°27′26″N 1°33′48″E		1186916	Upload Photo	Q26482158
7, Newmarket	II	7, Newmarket			22 September 1971	TM4217690355; 52°27′27″N 1°33′47″E		1186917	Upload Photo	Q26482159
8, Newmarket	II	8, Newmarket			22 September 1971	TM4219690390; 52°27′28″N 1°33′49″E		1298950	Upload Photo	Q26586386
10, Newmarket (see Details for Further Address Information)	II	10, Newmarket			22 September 1971	TM4217790417; 52°27′29″N 1°33′48″E		1298951	Upload Photo	Q26586387
12, Newmarket	II	12, Newmarket, Island Group			22 September 1971	TM4213690420; 52°27′29″N 1°33′45″E		1186924	Upload Photo	Q26482166
14, Newmarket	II	14, Newmarket, Island Group			22 September 1971	TM4213690413; 52°27′29″N 1°33′45″E		1186925	Upload Photo	Q26482167
15, Newmarket	II	15, Newmarket			22 September 1971	TM4214390354; 52°27′27″N 1°33′46″E		1205681	Upload Photo	Q26500990
18, Newmarket	II	18, Newmarket, Island Group			22 September 1971	TM4214990392; 52°27′28″N 1°33′46″E		1298952	Upload Photo	Q26586388
20, Newmarket	II	20, Newmarket, Island Group			22 September 1971	TM4215290383; 52°27′28″N 1°33′46″E		1186926	Upload Photo	Q26482168
23, Newmarket	II	23, Newmarket			22 September 1971	TM4211890360; 52°27′27″N 1°33′44″E		1186918	Upload Photo	Q26482160
24, Newmarket	II	24, Newmarket, Island Group			22 September 1971	TM4214190382; 52°27′28″N 1°33′46″E		1298953	Upload Photo	Q26586389
25, Newmarket	II	25, Newmarket			22 September 1971	TM4208990376; 52°27′27″N 1°33′43″E		1186920	Upload Photo	Q26482162
26 and 28, Newmarket	II	26 and 28, Newmarket, Island Group			22 September 1971	TM4213290383; 52°27′28″N 1°33′45″E		1186927	Upload Photo	Q26482169
White Horse	II	29, Newmarket	pub		22 September 1971	TM4208190397; 52°27′28″N 1°33′42″E		1205690	White Horse More images	Q26500999
30, Newmarket	II	30, Newmarket, Island Group			22 September 1971	TM4212190386; 52°27′28″N 1°33′45″E		1186928	Upload Photo	Q26482170
32, Newmarket	II	32, Newmarket, Island Group			22 September 1971	TM4212090392; 52°27′28″N 1°33′45″E		1186929	Upload Photo	Q26482171
33, Newmarket	II	33, Newmarket			22 September 1971	TM4209490409; 52°27′29″N 1°33′43″E		1298949	Upload Photo	Q26586385
37, Newmarket	II	37, Newmarket			22 September 1971	TM4209590429; 52°27′29″N 1°33′43″E		1280591	Upload Photo	Q26569710
28a, Newmarket	II	28a, Newmarket, Island Group			22 September 1971	TM4212690384; 52°27′28″N 1°33′45″E		1298954	Upload Photo	Q26586390
King's Head Hotel	II	Newmarket	hotel		22 September 1971	TM4218890378; 52°27′27″N 1°33′48″E		1186923	King's Head Hotel More images	Q26482165
Premises Occupied by Wine Shop	II	Newmarket			22 September 1971	TM4217790398; 52°27′28″N 1°33′48″E		1280568	Upload Photo	Q26569689
Swan House	II	Newmarket, Island Group	house		22 September 1971	TM4212390419; 52°27′29″N 1°33′45″E		1298955	Swan House More images	Q26586391
Tower House	II	Newmarket			16 March 1948	TM4210390444; 52°27′30″N 1°33′44″E		1186921	Upload Photo	Q26482163
Town Hall	II	Newmarket	city hall		16 March 1948	TM4213590434; 52°27′29″N 1°33′45″E		1205749	Town Hall More images	Q26501045
2, Northgate	II	2, Northgate			22 September 1971	TM4214090603; 52°27′35″N 1°33′46″E		1186931	Upload Photo	Q26482173
18, Northgate	II	18, Northgate			22 September 1971	TM4217290703; 52°27′38″N 1°33′48″E		1186932	Upload Photo	Q26482174
Oswald House	II	60, Northgate			16 March 1948	TM4219990883; 52°27′44″N 1°33′50″E		1205896	Upload Photo	Q26501176
69, Northgate	II	69, Northgate, NR34 9AU			22 September 1971	TM4216290998; 52°27′47″N 1°33′48″E		1298956	Upload Photo	Q26586392
72-78, Northgate	II	72-78, Northgate			23 August 1978	TM4217991021; 52°27′48″N 1°33′49″E		1186955	Upload Photo	Q26482197
80, Northgate	II	80, Northgate			23 August 1978	TM4218991037; 52°27′49″N 1°33′50″E		1261815	Upload Photo	Q26552739
Northgate House, 12, Northgate and Little End, 12b Northgate	II*	12b, Northgate, NR34 9AS			16 March 1948	TM4215190657; 52°27′36″N 1°33′47″E		1205862	Upload Photo	Q17546867
Staithe House	II	Northgate			16 March 1948	TM4219990798; 52°27′41″N 1°33′50″E		1298957	Upload Photo	Q26586393
The Staithe	II	Northgate			22 September 1971	TM4217890827; 52°27′42″N 1°33′49″E		1186930	Upload Photo	Q26482172
1, Old Market	II	1, Old Market			22 September 1971	TM4219490573; 52°27′34″N 1°33′49″E		1280462	Upload Photo	Q26569596
2, Old Market	II	2, Old Market			22 September 1971	TM4218190563; 52°27′33″N 1°33′48″E		1186939	Upload Photo	Q26482182
3, Old Market	II	3, Old Market			22 September 1971	TM4219490583; 52°27′34″N 1°33′49″E		1186934	Upload Photo	Q26482176
5, Old Market	II	5, Old Market			22 September 1971	TM4219590589; 52°27′34″N 1°33′49″E		1205926	Upload Photo	Q26501201
7, Old Market	II	7, Old Market			22 September 1971	TM4219490596; 52°27′34″N 1°33′49″E		1186935	Upload Photo	Q26482177
9, Old Market	II	9, Old Market			22 September 1971	TM4218390602; 52°27′35″N 1°33′48″E		1205933	Upload Photo	Q26501207
10, Old Market	II	10, Old Market			22 September 1971	TM4215890562; 52°27′33″N 1°33′47″E		1205964	Upload Photo	Q26501236
Bear and Bells Inn	II	11, Old Market	inn		22 September 1971	TM4217090605; 52°27′35″N 1°33′48″E		1186937	Bear and Bells Inn More images	Q26482179
13, Old Market	II	13, Old Market			22 September 1971	TM4216090602; 52°27′35″N 1°33′47″E		1186938	Upload Photo	Q26482181
15 and 17, Old Market	II	15 and 17, Old Market			22 September 1971	TM4214990600; 52°27′35″N 1°33′47″E		1205953	Upload Photo	Q26501225
Ravensmere House	II	Old Market			16 March 1948	TM4222690617; 52°27′35″N 1°33′51″E		1186936	Upload Photo	Q26482178
St Peter's House	I	Old Market			16 March 1948	TM4212290585; 52°27′34″N 1°33′45″E		1298958	Upload Photo	Q17527432
Pinfold (at Junction with Common Lane North)	II	Pound Road			22 September 1971	TM4239290900; 52°27′44″N 1°34′00″E		1186940	Upload Photo	Q26482183
26, Pudding Moor	II	26, Pudding Moor			22 September 1971	TM4198790452; 52°27′30″N 1°33′38″E		1205974	Upload Photo	Q26501246
30, Pudding Moor	II	30, Pudding Moor			22 September 1971	TM4201490455; 52°27′30″N 1°33′39″E		1186942	Upload Photo	Q26482184
Waveney House	I	Pudding Moor	building		16 March 1948	TM4204390572; 52°27′34″N 1°33′41″E		1186941	Waveney House More images	Q17527376
The Former Fox and Hounds Inn	II	Ravensmeer	inn		3 September 1975	TM4224190731; 52°27′39″N 1°33′52″E		1186954	The Former Fox and Hounds Inn More images	Q26482196
1, Saltgate	II	1, Saltgate			16 March 1948	TM4211690521; 52°27′32″N 1°33′45″E		1186943	Upload Photo	Q26482185
3, Saltgate	II	3, Saltgate			22 September 1971	TM4211890527; 52°27′32″N 1°33′45″E		1298960	Upload Photo	Q26586395
5, Saltgate	II	5, Saltgate			22 September 1971	TM4212090534; 52°27′33″N 1°33′45″E		1206016	Upload Photo	Q26501283
7, Saltgate	II	7, Saltgate			22 September 1971	TM4212090543; 52°27′33″N 1°33′45″E		1186944	Upload Photo	Q26482186
11, Saltgate	II	11, Saltgate			22 September 1971	TM4212490565; 52°27′34″N 1°33′45″E		1186945	Upload Photo	Q26482187
Gazebo at South West Corner of the Garden of Number 1	II	Saltgate			22 September 1971	TM4207390528; 52°27′32″N 1°33′42″E		1206009	Upload Photo	Q26501275
2 and 4, Smallgate	II	2 and 4, Smallgate			22 September 1971	TM4222990390; 52°27′28″N 1°33′50″E		1206139	Upload Photo	Q26501395
6, Smallgate	II	6, Smallgate			22 September 1971	TM4222390440; 52°27′29″N 1°33′50″E		1186949	Upload Photo	Q26482191
8, Smallgate	II	8, Smallgate			22 September 1971	TM4221990447; 52°27′30″N 1°33′50″E		1298964	Upload Photo	Q26586399
11, Smallgate	II	11, Smallgate			22 September 1971	TM4224990376; 52°27′27″N 1°33′51″E		1206064	Upload Photo	Q26501325
13, Smallgate	II	13, Smallgate			22 September 1971	TM4225090383; 52°27′27″N 1°33′51″E		1186946	Upload Photo	Q26482188
15, Smallgate	II	15, Smallgate			22 September 1971	TM4224990398; 52°27′28″N 1°33′51″E		1298962	Upload Photo	Q26586397
17, Smallgate	II	17, Smallgate			22 September 1971	TM4225090406; 52°27′28″N 1°33′51″E		1206108	Upload Photo	Q26501369
19, Smallgate	II	19, Smallgate			22 September 1971	TM4224590441; 52°27′29″N 1°33′51″E		1186947	Upload Photo	Q26482189
32, Smallgate	II	32, Smallgate			22 September 1971	TM4218790538; 52°27′33″N 1°33′48″E		1186950	Upload Photo	Q26482192
34, Smallgate	II	34, Smallgate			22 September 1971	TM4218390545; 52°27′33″N 1°33′48″E		1280378	Upload Photo	Q26569520
36, Smallgate	II	36, Smallgate			22 September 1971	TM4218390555; 52°27′33″N 1°33′48″E		1186951	Upload Photo	Q26482193
39, 39a and 41, Smallgate	II	39, 39a and 41, Smallgate			22 September 1971	TM4221290518; 52°27′32″N 1°33′50″E		1186948	Upload Photo	Q26482190
43 and 45, Smallgate	II	43 and 45, Smallgate			22 September 1971	TM4220790531; 52°27′32″N 1°33′49″E		1280367	Upload Photo	Q26569511
Norwich Union Assurance Group	II	49, Smallgate			22 September 1971	TM4220390543; 52°27′33″N 1°33′49″E		1298963	Upload Photo	Q26586398
Minster Church of St Benet, Beccles	II*	St Mary's Road, NR34 9NR	church building		4 January 2023	TM4190889969; 52°27′15″N 1°33′32″E		1478482	Minster Church of St Benet, Beccles More images	Q116262220
1 and 2, the Score	II	1 and 2, The Score			22 September 1971	TM4210890625; 52°27′35″N 1°33′44″E		1298961	Upload Photo	Q26586396
1, the Walk	II	1, The Walk			16 March 1948	TM4216990425; 52°27′29″N 1°33′47″E		1298965	Upload Photo	Q26586400
Former No 2 (south Portion and North Portion), the Walk	II	2 and 2a, The Walk, NR34 9AJ			22 September 1971	TM4216590432; 52°27′29″N 1°33′47″E		1206163	Upload Photo	Q26501417
3, the Walk	II	3, The Walk			22 September 1971	TM4215890450; 52°27′30″N 1°33′47″E		1186952	Upload Photo	Q26482194
4, the Walk	II	4, The Walk			22 September 1971	TM4215490459; 52°27′30″N 1°33′46″E		1298966	Upload Photo	Q26586401
5, the Walk	II	5, The Walk			22 September 1971	TM4215390470; 52°27′30″N 1°33′46″E		1206172	Upload Photo	Q26501424
6, the Walk	II	6, The Walk			22 September 1971	TM4215290483; 52°27′31″N 1°33′46″E		1186953	Upload Photo	Q26482195
7, the Walk	II	7, The Walk			22 September 1971	TM4215190489; 52°27′31″N 1°33′46″E		1206179	Upload Photo	Q26501430
8, the Walk	II	8, The Walk			22 September 1971	TM4215090496; 52°27′31″N 1°33′46″E		1298967	Upload Photo	Q26586402

== See also ==
- Grade I listed buildings in Suffolk
- Grade II* listed buildings in Suffolk

== Sources ==
- Bettely, James; Pevsner, Nikolaus (2015) [1961], Suffolk: East, The Buildings of England, New Haven and London: Yale University Press, ISBN 978-0-300-19654-2
