= 2023 East Suffolk District Council election =

2023 English local election

- 4 May 2023

All 55 seats to East Suffolk District Council 28 seats needed for a majority
	First party	Second party	Third party
Leader	Caroline Topping	Steve Gallant	Peter Byatt
Party	Green	Conservative	Labour
Last election	4 seats, 22.0%	39 seats, 38.2%	7 seats, 17.0%
Seats before	5	39	7
Seats won	16	15	12
Seat change	▲12	▼24	▲5
Popular vote	35,804	49,399	26,279
Percentage	26.8%	37.0%	19.7%
Swing	▲4.8%	▼1.2%	▲2.7%
	Fourth party	Fifth party
Leader	David Beavan
Party	Liberal Democrats	Independent
Last election	3 seats, 11.4%	2 seats, 4.8%
Seats before	3	1
Seats won	11	1
Seat change	▲8	▼1
Popular vote	21,106	641
Percentage	15.8%	0.5%
Swing	▲4.4%	▼4.3%
- Winner of each seat at the 2023 East Suffolk District Council election
Leader before election
Steve Gallant
Conservative
Leader after election
Caroline Topping
Green
No overall control

The 2023 East Suffolk District Council election took place on 4 May 2023 to elect members of East Suffolk District Council in Suffolk, England. This was held on the same day as other local elections. All 55 seats on the council were up for election.

== Summary ==
Prior to the election the council was under Conservative majority control. The Conservative leader of the council, Steve Gallant, did not stand for re-election in 2023.

Following the results of the election, the Conservatives lost control of the council to no overall control, with the three opposition parties making gains at their expense. A coalition of the Greens, Liberal Democrats and the independent councillor subsequently formed. On 24 May 2023, at the inaugural council meeting for the 2023-2024 term, Caroline Topping, a Green Party councillor for Beccles & Worlingham ward, was elected as leader of the council, with Liberal Democrat leader David Beavan becoming deputy leader. The new administration holds 28 out of 55 seats and has a majority of 1.

== Overall results ==
The overall results were as follows:

2023 East Suffolk District Council election
Party	Candidates	Seats	Gains	Losses	Net gain/loss	Seats %	Votes %	Votes	+/−
Green	37	16	12	0	▲12	29.1	26.8	35,804	+4.8
Conservative	55	15	0	24	▼24	27.3	37.0	49,399	–1.2
Labour	37	12	5	0	▲5	21.8	19.7	26,279	+2.7
Liberal Democrats	25	11	8	0	▲8	20.0	15.8	21,106	+4.4
Independent	3	1	0	1	▼1	1.8	0.5	641	–4.3
Communist	2	0	0	0	Steady	0.0	0.2	257	N/A
Heritage	1	0	0	0	Steady	0.0	<0.1	56	N/A

== Ward results ==
The Statement of Persons Nominated, which details the candidates standing in each ward, was released by East Suffolk District Council following the close of nominations on 4 April 2023. The results for each ward were as follows, with an asterisk (*) indicating an incumbent councillor standing for re-election:

=== Aldeburgh & Leiston ===
Aldeburgh & Leiston (3 seats)
Party	Candidate	Votes	%	±%
Green	Tom Daly*	2,086	54.8	+35.7
Green	Katie Graham	1,961	51.5	+36.1
Green	Sarah Whitelock	1,896	49.8	+36.4
Conservative	Jocelyn Bond	1,275	33.5	+2.1
Conservative	Tony Cooper*	1,233	32.4	–1.3
Conservative	Andrew Reid	1,089	28.6	–2.1
Labour	David Grugeon	599	15.7	–6.6
Labour	Ray Breach	561	14.7	–6.1
Turnout		3,808	38.6	+0.4
Rejected ballots		45	1.2	
Registered electors		9,876		
Green gain from Conservative				
Green gain from Conservative				
Green gain from Independent				

Tom Daly previously won a seat in a by-election, however the seat is shown as a gain as compared to the 2019 election.

=== Beccles & Worlingham ===
Beccles & Worlingham (3 seats)
Party	Candidate	Votes	%	±%
Green	Caroline Topping*	2,792	67.7	+2.0
Green	Sarah Plummer*	2,673	64.8	–7.6
Green	Sheryl Rumble	2,471	59.9	–5.5
Conservative	Trish Mortimer*	851	20.6	–4.0
Conservative	Bernard Reader	806	19.6	–1.5
Conservative	May Reader	784	19.0	+3.0
Labour	Sam Hunt	583	14.1	+8.9
Labour	Tarek Lahin	531	12.9	+7.7
Labour	Tony Burgess	487	11.8	N/A
Turnout		4,122	35.0	–9.1
Rejected ballots		39	0.9	
Registered electors		11,768		
Green hold				
Green hold				
Green hold				

=== Bungay & Wainford ===
Bungay & Wainford (2 seats)
Party	Candidate	Votes	%	±%
Green	Toby Hammond	1,682	59.0	+25.0
Green	Anthony Speca	1,569	55.1	+27.3
Conservative	Judy Cloke*	812	28.5	–14.2
Conservative	Mark Bee	776	27.2	–15.9
Labour	Tim Mobbs	294	10.3	–5.0
Labour	Chris Sadler	229	8.0	–5.8
Independent	Natalie Carlile	169	5.9	N/A
Turnout		2,850	41.5	+5.5
Rejected ballots		14	0.5	
Registered electors		6,868		
Green gain from Conservative				
Green gain from Conservative				

=== Carlford & Fynn Valley ===
Carlford & Fynn Valley (2 seats)
Party	Candidate	Votes	%	±%
Green	Dan Clery	1,388	50.6	+23.5
Conservative	Colin Hedgley*	1,272	46.3	–4.2
Green	Nigel Hiley	1,263	46.0	+26.2
Conservative	Ben Coupe	1,257	45.8	–4.1
Turnout		2,745	40.7	+1.8
Rejected ballots		60	2.2	
Registered electors		6,745		
Green gain from Conservative				
Conservative hold				

=== Carlton & Whitton ===
Carlton & Whitton (2 seats)
Party	Candidate	Votes	%	±%
Conservative	Jamie Starling	904	45.5	+13.7
Conservative	Jenny Ceresa*	879	44.3	+14.2
Labour	Charlotte Barker	769	38.7	+12.6
Labour	Sonia Barker	758	38.2	+16.9
Green	Anna Hammond	191	9.6	–2.7
Green	Daniel Keates	143	7.2	N/A
Liberal Democrats	John Mercer	135	6.8	–0.7
Liberal Democrats	Dave O'Neill	90	4.5	N/A
Turnout		1,985	25.4	–3.2
Rejected ballots		16	0.8	
Registered electors		7,802		
Conservative hold				
Conservative hold				

=== Carlton Colville ===
Carlton Colville (2 seats)
Party	Candidate	Votes	%	±%
Conservative	Craig Rivett*	787	41.7	+8.1
Conservative	Myles Scrancher	696	36.9	–0.4
Liberal Democrats	Adam Robertson	658	34.9	+5.8
Liberal Democrats	Chris Thomas	604	32.0	+2.9
Labour	Christian Newsome	473	25.1	+6.8
Labour	Jack Smith	438	23.2	+7.4
Turnout		1,887	25.4	–2.8
Rejected ballots		24	1.3	
Registered electors		7,439		
Conservative hold				
Conservative hold				

=== Deben ===
Deben
Party	Candidate	Votes	%	±%
Conservative	James Mallinder*	773	51.5	+3.9
Green	Richard Noble	729	48.5	+29.6
Majority		44	3.0	–23.6
Turnout		1,517	40.5	–0.5
Rejected ballots		15	1.0	
Registered electors		3,742		
Conservative hold		Swing	▼12.9	

=== Eastern Felixstowe ===
Eastern Felixstowe
Party	Candidate	Votes	%	±%
Liberal Democrats	Seamus Bennett	2,288	50.2	+19.4
Liberal Democrats	Jan Candy	1,838	40.3	+15.8
Conservative	Mark Jepson*	1,722	37.8	+0.2
Conservative	Steve Wiles*	1,676	36.8	–3.2
Liberal Democrats	David Underwood	1,567	34.4	+10.9
Conservative	Anthony Malster	1,521	33.4	–10.4
Labour	David Rowe	1,115	24.5	+3.1
Communist	Hagar Babbington	154	3.4	N/A
Turnout		4,559	42.9	+3.7
Rejected ballots		105	2.3	
Registered electors		10,638		
Liberal Democrats gain from Conservative				
Liberal Democrats gain from Conservative				
Conservative hold				

=== Framlingham ===
Framlingham (2 seats)
Party	Candidate	Votes	%	±%
Green	Vince Langdon-Morris	1,652	57.9	+23.6
Liberal Democrats	Owen Grey	1,283	45.0	+16.1
Conservative	Tom Faulkner	1,051	36.9	–2.5
Conservative	Maurice Cook*	1,046	36.7	–5.3
Turnout		2,851	41.0	+3.3
Rejected ballots		28	1.0	
Registered electors		6,961		
Green gain from Conservative				
Liberal Democrats gain from Conservative				

=== Gunton & St Margarets ===
Gunton & St Margarets (2 seats)
Party	Candidate	Votes	%	±%
Labour	George King	1,020	44.6	+19.9
Labour	Graham Parker	960	42.0	+21.6
Conservative	Linda Coulam*	933	40.8	+10.8
Conservative	Ryan Harvey	801	35.1	+1.1
Green	Alison Ballantyne	208	9.1	–14.3
Green	Kerri Edmondson	198	8.7	N/A
Liberal Democrats	Fiona Shreeve	121	5.3	N/A
Liberal Democrats	John Shreeve	94	4.1	N/A
Turnout		2,285	30.0	±0.0
Rejected ballots		38	1.7	
Registered electors		7,626		
Labour gain from Conservative				
Labour gain from Conservative				

=== Halesworth & Blything ===
Halesworth & Blything (2 seats)
Party	Candidate	Votes	%	±%
Green	Beth Keys-Holloway	1,756	65.6	+23.0
Green	Geoffrey Wakeling	1,702	63.6	N/A
Conservative	Alison Cackett*	760	28.4	–15.0
Conservative	Graham Catchpole	629	23.5	–19.3
Labour	John Murray	254	9.5	–14.2
Turnout		2,675	40.2	+3.4
Rejected ballots		28	1.0	
Registered electors		6,647		
Green gain from Conservative				
Green gain from Conservative				

=== Harbour & Normanston ===
Harbour & Normanston (3 seats)
Party	Candidate	Votes	%	±%
Labour	Janet Craig*	1,117	55.2	+19.1
Labour	Keith Patience*	1,109	54.8	+17.4
Labour	Tess Gandy*	1,088	53.8	+18.4
Conservative	David Coulam	560	27.7	+14.2
Conservative	Deanna Law	516	25.5	+12.7
Conservative	Vince Rule	473	23.4	+11.8
Green	Alice Eastaugh	309	15.3	–0.7
Green	Phillip Love	282	13.9	N/A
Green	Debbie Ray	272	13.5	N/A
Turnout		2,022	18.1	–4.3
Rejected ballots		33	1.6	
Registered electors		11,176		
Labour hold				
Labour hold				
Labour hold				

=== Kelsale & Yoxford ===
Kelsale & Yoxford
Party	Candidate	Votes	%	±%
Liberal Democrats	Julia Ewart	752	54.4	+31.4
Conservative	Alexander Nicoll	356	25.8	–18.8
Labour	John Clark	274	19.8	N/A
Majority		396	28.6	N/A
Turnout		1,397	43.9	+5.2
Rejected ballots		15	1.1	
Registered electors		3,179		
Liberal Democrats gain from Conservative		Swing	▲25.1	

=== Kesgrave ===
Kesgrave (3 seats)
Party	Candidate	Votes	%	±%
Conservative	Debbie McCallum*	1,958	58.6	–1.3
Conservative	Stuart Lawson*	1,367	40.9	–8.2
Conservative	Geoff Lynch*	1,261	37.7	–9.6
Liberal Democrats	Brad Clements	1,207	36.1	+12.6
Labour	Lesley Bensley	972	29.1	+12.8
Green	Marcin Burcon	905	27.1	+5.2
Liberal Democrats	Sally Neal	862	25.8	N/A
Turnout		3,342	29.9	+0.6
Rejected ballots		39	1.2	
Registered electors		11,161		
Conservative hold				
Conservative hold				
Conservative hold				

=== Kessingland ===
Kessingland
Party	Candidate	Votes	%	±%
Labour	Alan Green	398	37.0	+4.9
Conservative	Letitia Smith*	359	33.4	–1.0
Green	Jon Coxon	318	29.6	+8.3
Majority		39	3.6	N/A
Turnout		1,086	31.2	+1.8
Rejected ballots		11	1.0	
Registered electors		3,485		
Labour gain from Conservative		Swing	▲2.9	

=== Kirkley & Pakefield ===
Kirkley & Pakefield (3 seats)
Party	Candidate	Votes	%	±%
Labour	Louise Gooch*	1,422	52.0	+15.8
Labour	Peter Byatt*	1,421	52.0	+15.6
Labour	Malcolm Pitchers*	1,239	45.4	+14.5
Conservative	David Bromley	866	31.7	+3.0
Conservative	June Ford	848	31.0	+3.9
Conservative	Jean Bowry	788	28.8	+4.1
Green	Annette Abbott	474	17.3	–4.0
Green	Alan Barnes	406	14.9	N/A
Green	Christopher Hart	323	11.8	N/A
Turnout		2,732	26.2	–1.5
Rejected ballots		39	1.4	
Registered electors		10,441		
Labour hold				
Labour hold				
Labour hold				

=== Lothingland ===
Lothingland
Party	Candidate	Votes	%	±%
Conservative	Paul Ashdown*	434	47.1	–1.0
Labour	Thomas Leveritt	318	34.5	+8.7
Green	Rosemary Brambley	111	12.0	–6.5
Liberal Democrats	Susan Groome	59	6.4	–1.1
Majority		116	12.6	–9.7
Turnout		925	31.6	–0.9
Rejected ballots		3	0.3	
Registered electors		2,926		
Conservative hold		Swing	▼4.9	

=== Martlesham & Purdis Farm ===
Martlesham & Purdis Farm (2 seats)
Party	Candidate	Votes	%	±%
Liberal Democrats	Edward Thompson*	1,229	54.0	+9.5
Liberal Democrats	Mark Packard	1,094	48.0	N/A
Conservative	Chris Blundell*	1,076	47.2	–9.1
Conservative	Guy Jenkinson	930	40.8	–1.9
Turnout		2,278	37.2	+3.1
Rejected ballots		36	1.6	
Registered electors		6,121		
Liberal Democrats hold				
Liberal Democrats gain from Conservative				

=== Melton ===
Melton
Party	Candidate	Votes	%	±%
Green	Rachel Smith-Lyte*	890	52.1	–7.8
Conservative	Alan Porter	641	37.5	–2.6
Labour	Katherine Bicknell	178	10.4	N/A
Majority		249	14.6	–5.2
Turnout		1,716	47.7	+1.6
Rejected ballots		7	0.4	
Registered electors		3,594		
Green hold		Swing	▼2.6	

=== Orwell & Villages ===
Orwell & Villages (2 seats)
Party	Candidate	Votes	%	±%
Liberal Democrats	Mike Ninnmey	1,736	62.5	N/A
Liberal Democrats	Lee Reeves	1,492	53.7	N/A
Conservative	Mick Richardson	1,004	36.2	–2.6
Conservative	Patti Mulcahy	858	30.9	–6.7
Turnout		2,776	35.9	–3.0
Rejected ballots		38	1.4	
Registered electors		7,730		
Liberal Democrats gain from Conservative				
Liberal Democrats gain from Conservative				

=== Oulton Broad ===
Oulton Broad (3 seats)
Party	Candidate	Votes	%	±%
Conservative	Edward Back*	1,403	48.9	+9.2
Conservative	Keith Robinson*	1,329	46.3	+9.3
Conservative	Andrée Gee*	1,304	45.5	+8.9
Labour	Bob Groome	989	34.5	+11.5
Labour	Jen Jones	985	34.3	+9.2
Labour	Paul Page	886	30.9	+9.9
Green	Andrew Eastnaugh	321	11.2	–0.8
Green	Susan Steward	295	10.4	–1.3
Green	Jesse Timberlake	286	10.0	N/A
Liberal Democrats	Simon MacDowall	163	5.7	–3.8
Liberal Democrats	Andrew Turner	142	4.9	N/A
Liberal Democrats	Timothy Sutton-Day	137	4.8	N/A
Turnout		2,869	26.4	–2.3
Rejected ballots		36	1.3	
Registered electors		10,852		
Conservative hold				
Conservative hold				
Conservative hold				

=== Rendlesham & Orford ===
Rendlesham & Orford
Party	Candidate	Votes	%	±%
Green	Tim Wilson	842	58.1	+36.9
Conservative	Ray Herring*	550	38.0	–13.9
Heritage	Martin Foxton	56	3.9	N/A
Majority		292	20.1	N/A
Turnout		1,455	37.8	+4.2
Rejected ballots		7	0.5	
Registered electors		3,841		
Green gain from Conservative		Swing	▲24.5	

=== Rushmere St Andrew ===
Rushmere St Andrew
Party	Candidate	Votes	%	±%
Conservative	Deborah Dean	582	46.8	–11.1
Labour	Alistair Dick	405	32.6	+12.5
Green	Stewart Belfield	256	20.6	–1.4
Majority		177	14.2	–21.7
Turnout		1,252	35.4	+3.0
Rejected ballots		9	0.7	
Registered electors		3,539		
Conservative hold		Swing	▼8.6	

=== Saxmundham ===
Saxmundham
Party	Candidate	Votes	%	±%
Independent	John Fisher*	396	34.5	–11.5
Liberal Democrats	James Sandbach	320	27.9	+1.9
Conservative	Phillip Dunnett	222	19.3	–7.9
Labour	Mark Turner	210	18.3	N/A
Majority		76	6.6	–12.2
Turnout		1,156	33.3	–0.4
Rejected ballots		8	0.7	
Registered electors		3,472		
Independent hold		Swing	▼6.7	

=== Southwold ===
Southwold
Party	Candidate	Votes	%	±%
Liberal Democrats	David Beavan*	1,122	72.4	–8.4
Conservative	Tony Goldson	265	17.1	+1.6
Labour	Stephen Stansfeld	87	5.6	+1.9
Independent	Kevin Cross	76	4.9	N/A
Majority		857	55.3	–10.0
Turnout		1,553	48.2	–8.0
Rejected ballots		3	0.2	
Registered electors		3,221		
Liberal Democrats hold		Swing	▼5.0	

=== Western Felixstowe ===
Western Felixstowe (3 seats)
Party	Candidate	Votes	%	±%
Labour	Mike Deacon*	1,204	49.8	+7.5
Labour	Amanda Folley	965	39.9	+6.7
Labour	Rosie Smithson	916	37.9	+8.3
Conservative	Stuart Bird*	848	35.1	–1.3
Conservative	Tracey Green*	829	34.3	–1.0
Conservative	Steve Bain	815	33.7	+1.3
Green	Richard Keyworth	456	18.9	–1.9
Green	Angus Thody	364	15.1	–4.4
Communist	Mark Jones	103	4.3	N/A
Turnout		2,416	27.6	–0.4
Rejected ballots		51	2.1	
Registered electors		8,759		
Labour hold				
Labour gain from Conservative				
Labour gain from Conservative				

=== Wickham Market ===
Wickham Market (1 councillor)
Party	Candidate	Votes	%	±%
Green	Sally Noble	930	62.6	+45.3
Conservative	Carol Poulter*	555	37.4	–9.7
Majority		375	25.2	N/A
Turnout		1,493	38.3	+0.6
Rejected ballots		8	0.5	
Registered electors		3,895		
Green gain from Conservative		Swing	▲27.5	

=== Woodbridge ===
Woodbridge
Party	Candidate	Votes	%	±%
Green	Stephen Molyneux	1,404	48.9	N/A
Liberal Democrats	Kay Yule*	1,220	42.5	–12.9
Labour	Paul Richards	864	30.1	–6.8
Conservative	Geoff Holdcroft	845	29.4	–7.5
Conservative	Stephen Attwell	776	27.0	–11.1
Turnout		2,870	44.9	+1.2
Rejected ballots		10	0.3	
Registered electors		6,398		
Green gain from Conservative				
Liberal Democrats hold				

=== Wrentham, Wangford & Westleton ===
Wrentham, Wangford & Westleton
Party	Candidate	Votes	%	±%
Liberal Democrats	Paul Ashton	893	59.5	+32.8
Conservative	Norman Brooks*	448	29.8	–5.6
Labour	Jane Murray	161	10.7	–3.6
Majority		445	29.7	N/A
Turnout		1,518	44.3	+5.1
Rejected ballots		16	1.1	
Registered electors		3,428		
Liberal Democrats gain from Conservative		Swing	▲19.2	

== Changes 2023–present ==
=== By-elections ===
==== Carlton Colville ====
Carlton Colville: 4 July 2024
Party	Candidate	Votes	%	±%
Conservative	Letitia Smith	1,474	34.9	–6.1
Labour	Lewis Weller	1,303	30.9	+6.2
Liberal Democrats	Adam Robertson	923	21.9	–12.4
Independent	Paul Light	520	12.3	N/A
Majority		171	4.0	N/A
Turnout		4,310	56.7	+31.3
Registered electors		7,604		
Conservative hold		Swing	▼6.2	

==== Rushmere St Andrew ====
A by-election was held after Conservative councillor Deborah Dean resigned.

Rushmere St Andrew by-election: 27 February 2025
Party	Candidate	Votes	%	±%
Conservative	Robert Cawley	377	29.8	–17.0
Green	Julian Cusack	373	29.5	+8.9
Reform	Alistair Jeffreys	347	27.5	N/A
Labour	Laurence Bradley	166	13.1	–19.5
Majority		4	0.3	–13.9
Turnout		1,264	35.6	+0.2
Registered electors		3,551		
Conservative hold		Swing	▼13.0	

==== Woodbridge ====
A by-election was held after Liberal Democrat councillor and cabinet member Kay Yule resigned for health reasons; she died on 19 December 2024, shortly before the by-election was held.

Woodbridge by-election: 27 February 2025
Party	Candidate	Votes	%	±%
Liberal Democrats	Ruth Leach	1,023	53.6	+25.4
Conservative	Alan Porter	391	20.5	+1.0
Reform	Garry Debenham	274	14.4	N/A
Labour	Des Waters	219	11.5	–8.4
Majority		632	33.1	N/A
Turnout		1,908	30.0	–14.9
Registered electors		6,352		
Liberal Democrats hold		Swing	▲12.2	
