= Sinks Valley, Kesgrave =

Site of Specific Scientific Interest in the UK

Coordinates: 52.07°N 1.247°E

- Site of Special Scientific Interest
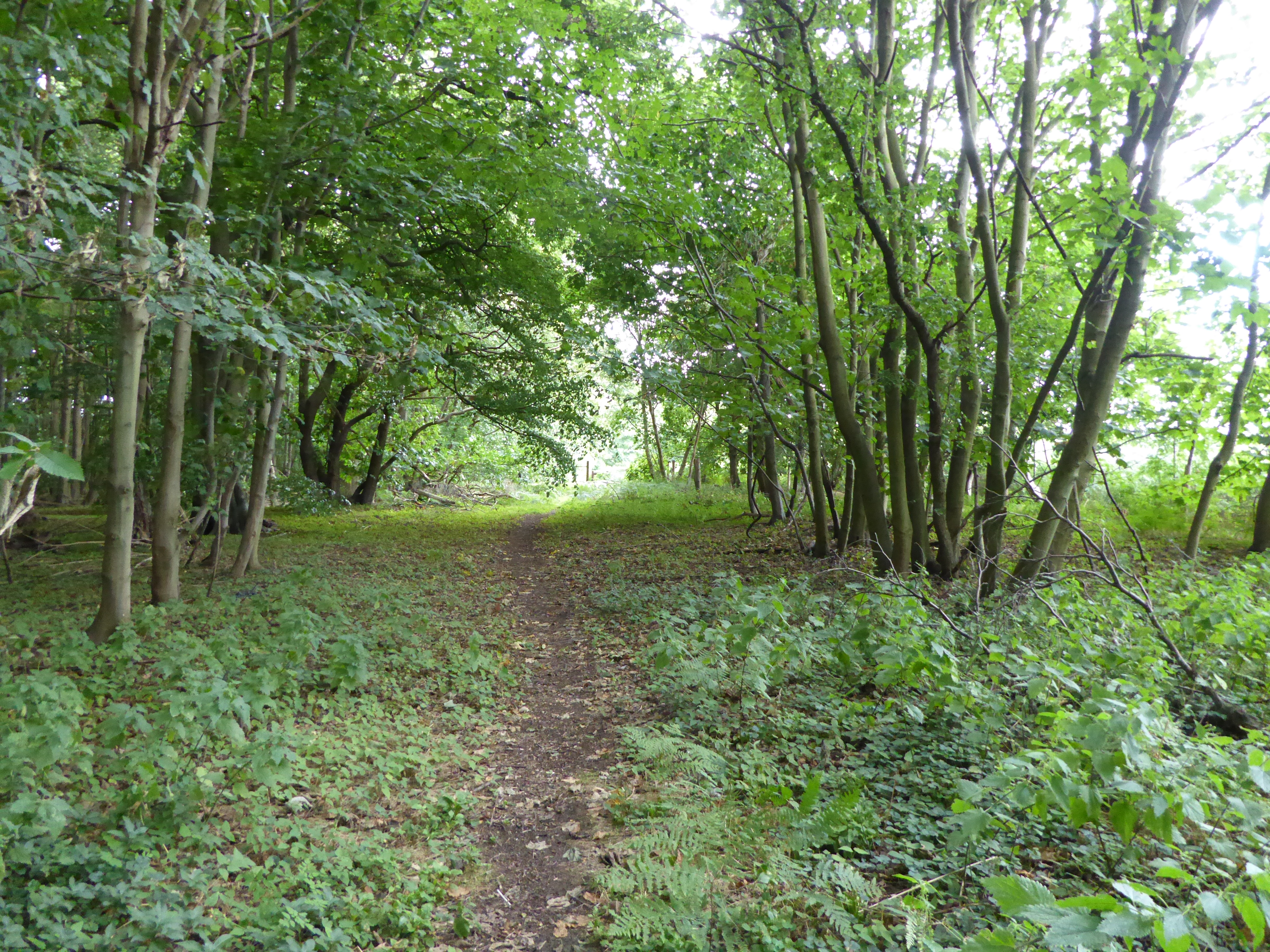
- Location of Sinks Valley, Kesgrave.
- Area of search: Suffolk
- Grid reference: TM 226 463
- Interest: Biological
- Area: 24.9 ha (62 acres)
- Notification date: 1996
- Location map: Magic Map

Sinks Valley is a 24.9-hectare (62-acre) biological Site of Special Scientific Interest in Kesgrave, on the eastern outskirts of Ipswich in Suffolk, United Kingdom.

This site has diverse semi-natural habitats, with alder and oak woodland, a brook with fringing swamp, wet and dry grassland, spring fed fen and heath. Areas grazed by rabbits have a short turf rich in lichens, mosses and herbs. The nationally uncommon mossy stonecrop grows on paths.

The site is private property with no public access.
