= Kesgrave =

Town in Suffolk, England

Coordinates: 52.0629°N 1.2379°E

- All Saints church, Kesgrave

- Location within Suffolk
- Population: 14,168 (2011)
- OS grid reference: TM220454
- District: East Suffolk
- Shire county: Suffolk
- Region: East
- Country: England
- Sovereign state: United Kingdom
- Post town: IPSWICH
- Postcode district: IP5
- Dialling code: 01473
- Police: Suffolk
- Fire: Suffolk
- Ambulance: East of England
- UK Parliament: Central Suffolk and North Ipswich
- Website: kesgravetowncouncil.org.uk

Kesgrave is a town and civil parish in the East Suffolk district of Suffolk, England. The town is close to both Ipswich and Woodbridge. Its developed area was included within the ONS-defined Ipswich Built-up Area for statistical purposes at the 2011 Census.

== History ==
The name Kesgrave is thought to derive from the Old English cærsegræf or cærsegrǣfe meaning 'cress pit' or 'cress grove'.

The area was recorded as Gressgrava in the Domesday Book, by the late 15th century its name had become Kesgrave. Kesgrave remained a small agricultural settlement with just a church, inn and a few farmsteads for over 700 years. In 1921 the population was only 103 housed in 20 dwellings. Since then great changes have taken place.

By 1988 Kesgrave covered an area of more than 800 acres (320 ha; 1.3 sq mi). Kesgrave parish council officially adopted the title of a town in January 2000.

== Schools ==
Kesgrave High School is a large 11–18 comprehensive co-educational school with nearly 2000 pupils. A study for Sustrans noted that 61% of the pupils cycled to the school. This is largely due to the installation of a large cycle lane through the local housing development and along the main road. The school actively encourages walking or cycling and provides bicycle storage facilities.

The three primary schools in Kesgrave are Cedarwood Primary School the building of which was awarded a Civic Trust Award in 2003, Gorseland Primary School and Heath Primary School.

Kesgrave was once home to a private day and boarding school based at Kesgrave Hall(now a hotel):

- St. Edmund's School (1946–1975)
- Kesgrave Hall School (1976–1993)
- Shawe Manor (1993)
- Ryes School (2004–2007)

== Gallery ==
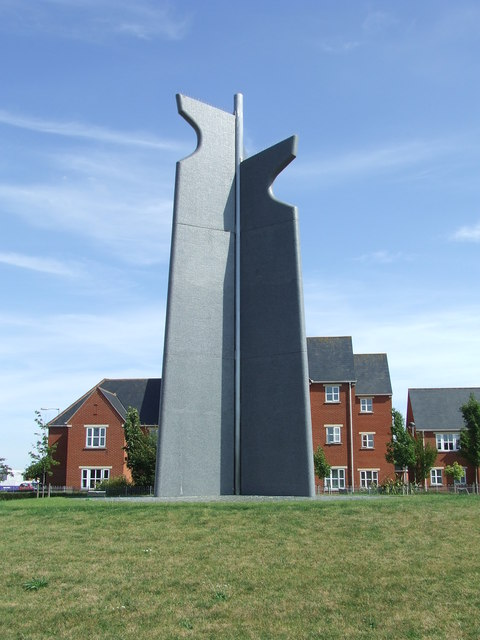
Computer commemoration monument

Main road in Kesgrave

Kesgrave All Saints

Kesgrave Social Club

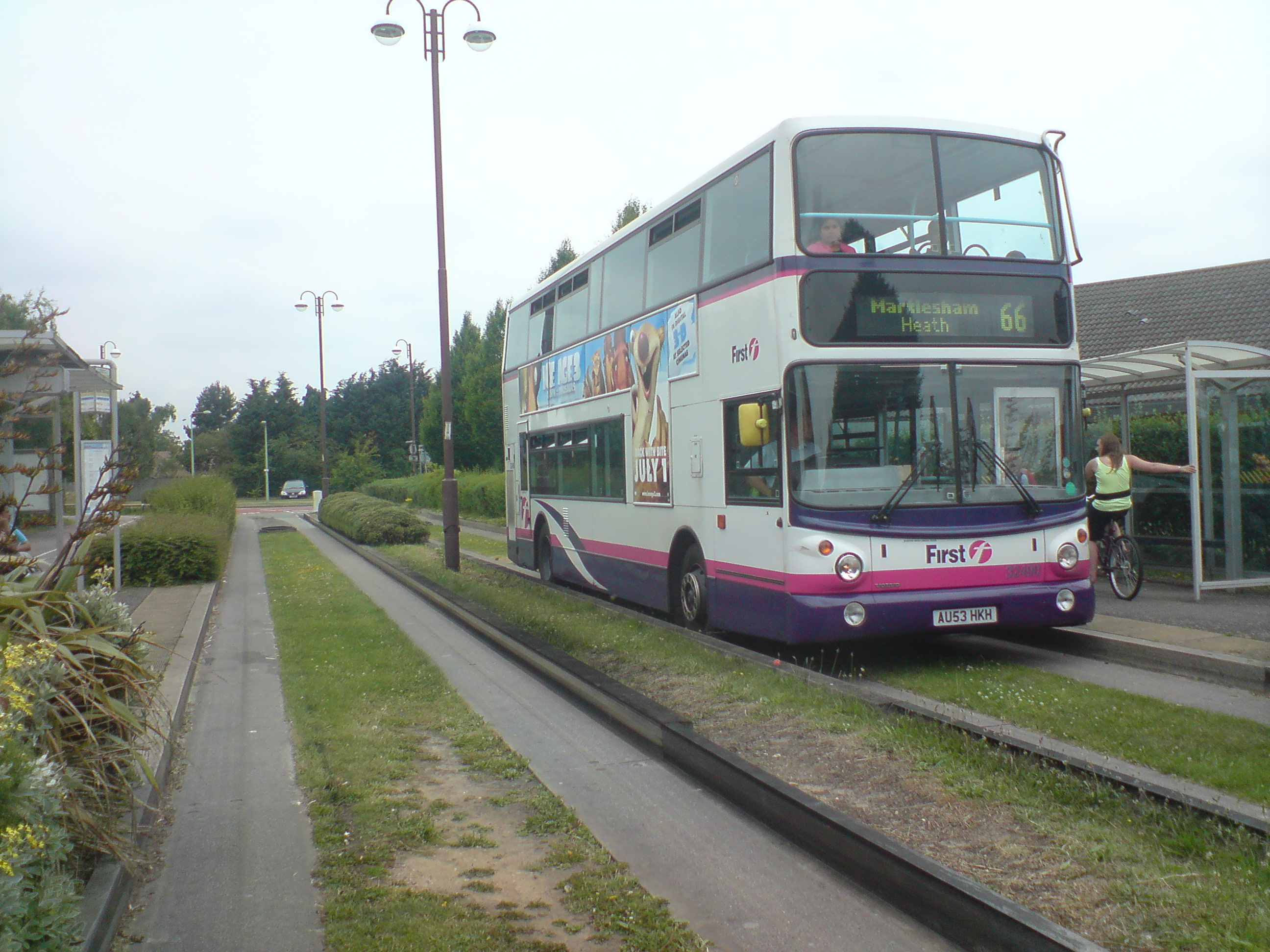
Guided busway

Kesgrave traffic sign

== Notable residents ==
- Lawrence Ward, former Serjeant at Arms of the British House of Commons.
- Anthony Cornforth (co-creator of Makaton)
- Luke Chambers (former professional football player)
- Jeremy Marchant (animal welfare scientist)

== See also ==
- Sinks Valley, Kesgrave
