= Kesgrave Hall =

Building in Kesgrave, Suffolk, England

Coordinates: 52.070771°N 1.256759°E

Kesgrave Hall Hotel

Kesgrave Hall is a country house located in woodlands north of the town of Kesgrave, which itself is on the eastern outskirts of Ipswich, in Suffolk, England. It was constructed in 1812 by William Cunliffe-Shawe, and has been extended since, notably by the addition of a northern extension. The building has five large rooms downstairs, with another two in the northern extension, with a further seven upstairs.

The building is set in 38 acres (150,000 m^{2}) of grounds, which includes woodlands, marsh and fields; a stream, which rises on Playford Heath, north of Kesgrave village, and joins the River Fynn, itself a tributary of the Deben, at Martlesham, runs west to east through the grounds.

The Hall has had several uses during its life, including housing five different boarding schools. Since late April 2008, the building has been used as a restaurant and hotel and owned as a joint venture by the Hills Building Group and the Milsom Hotel Group.

== Kesgrave Hall until 1939 ==
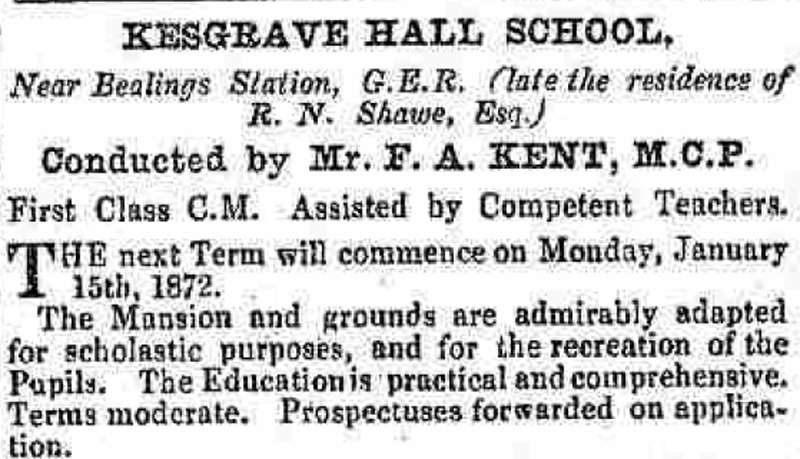
Advertisement for Kesgrave Hall School in 1871

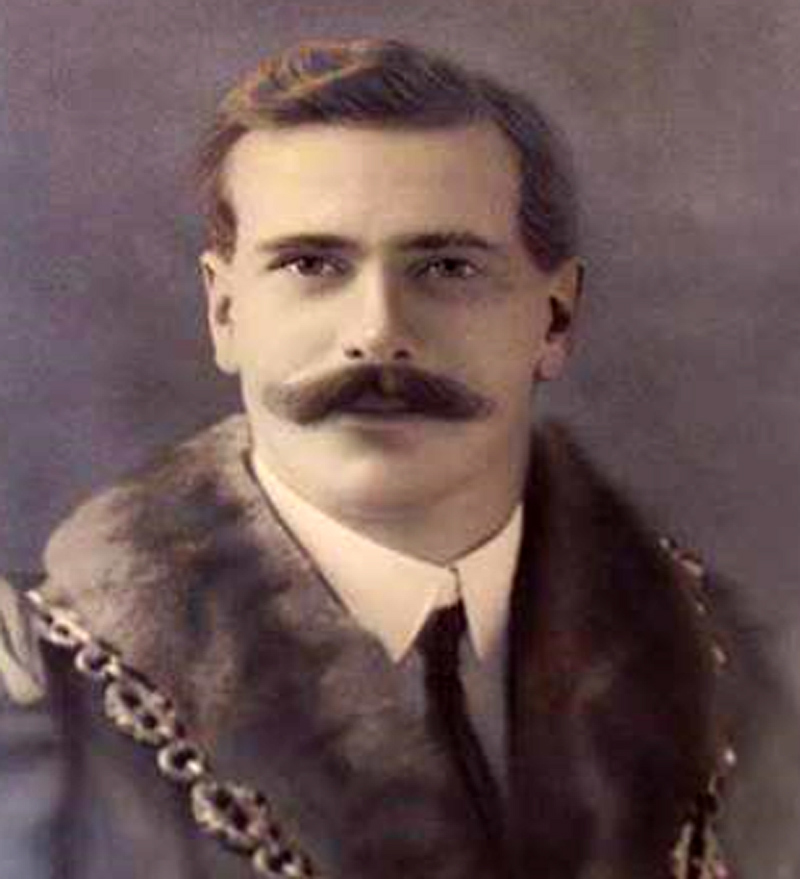
Philip Wyndham Cobbold

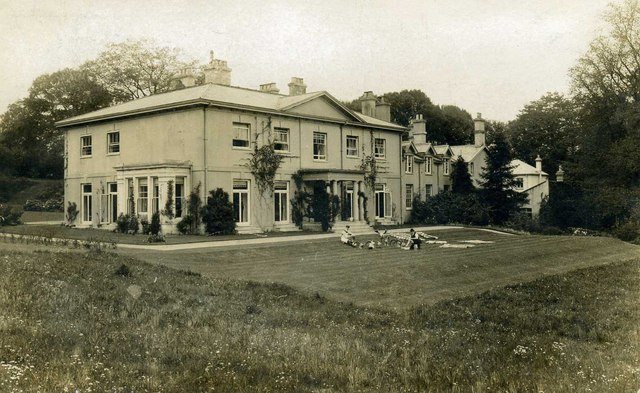
Kesgrave Hall 1907 at the time it was owned by the Cobbold family - Photograph courtesy of Nicholas Mutton

Kesgrave Hall was built in 1812 by William Cunliffe Shawe who had been a Member of Parliament for Preston in Lancaster from 1792 to 1796. He was also a wealthy landowner who acquired estates in Lancaster, Middlesex and Suffolk. It appears that he did not live in the Hall but instead gave it to his son Robert Newton Shawe who took up residence soon after his marriage.

Robert Newton Shawe was born in 1784 in Enfield in Middlesex. In 1811 he married Frances Ann Jones, daughter of Thomas Jones, a lawyer and landowner in Stapleton in Gloucestershire. As owner of the Kesgrave Estate Robert became active in community life, and he built and supported the Kesgrave District School from 1840. He was also a magistrate, and between 1832 and 1836 the Member of Parliament for East Suffolk.

The couple had no children and when Robert died in 1855 and his wife Frances Ann in 1856, the estate was left to her favourite nephew, opera singer Henry Whitworth Jones (1817–1891) who sold the property to Colonel George Tomline of Orwell Park. Tomline was a wealthy landowner and Member of Parliament. Tomline did not buy the Kesgrave Estate as a residence instead he wanted the land for agricultural use. He therefore let Kesgrave Hall to Francis Aldous Kent who was a schoolmaster. Kent established the Kesgrave Hall School which operated from about 1870 to 1900. An advertisement for the school which appeared in a newspaper of 1871 is shown.

Colonel George Tomline died in 1889 and, as he had no children, his cousin Captain Ernest George Pretyman inherited Kesgrave Hall. He did not live there but continued to let it to the Kent family as a school until about 1900. Around 1905 he sold it to Philip Wyndham Cobbold.

Philip Wyndham Cobbold was born in 1875 in Ipswich. His family owned the brewing company Cobbold and Co. and Philip joined the family business. In 1902 he married Cecily Augusta Nevill. Philip became the Mayor of Ipswich for 1910–11 and a photo of him at this time is shown. The photo of Kesgrave Hall in 1907 shown is taken at the time the Cobbold family was in residence there.

In the 1920s and 1930s the Hall was occupied by Colonel Christopher Chevallier Barnes. He was born in 1873 in India and had served in the Boer War where he had been severely wounded and later joined the Royal Field Artillery. In 1905 he married Mary Elizabeth Robinson of Durham. He lived in Kesgrave Hall after his retirement until about 1937.

== Second World War (1939–1945) ==
During the war the Hall was used by the RAF, and by the pilots of the USAF 359th Fighter Squadron, part of the 356th Fighter Group, who were involved in aerial operations over France, Belgium, the Netherlands, Germany and Central Europe out of the nearby RAF Martlesham Heath.

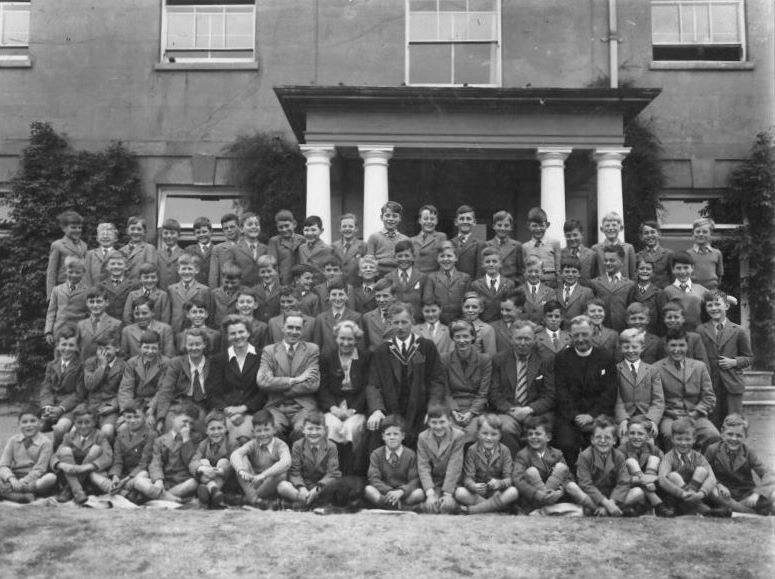
St. Edmund's School - 1947

== St. Edmund's School (1946–1975) ==
The third school to use the Hall was St. Edmund's School, a boys' preparatory boarding school. This school was founded in 1936 in a large house on the corner of St. Edmunds Road and Henley Road (No.57) in Ipswich, hence the name, but was evacuated to Dursley during World War II. In 1944 the school returned to Ipswich and moved to Kesgrave Hall in 1946 after outgrowing its original premises. The school was founded by the Marshall family. Kenneth Marshall, the founding headmaster, died in 1938 and the school was under a headmaster by the name of Maurice McClintock in the 1940s/50s. The school was taken over by the Mills family in 1958 and took on many improvements, including its own swimming pool (now filled in) and the draining and levelling of the marsh at the front of the main building for playing fields. Major John Mills was headmaster until the school closed in 1975.

== Kesgrave Hall School (1976–1993) ==
Kesgrave Hall, 1988 - Photograph courtesy of Nicholas Mutton

The fourth school at the Hall, known as Kesgrave Hall School opened in 1976. This was also a boys' boarding school and was founded by teachers from a boys' junior boarding school, Heanton in Devon. The teachers found that boys from that school were ill-served by their secondary schools.

As with Heanton, Kesgrave Hall School was established for boys with a strong academic ability but with perceived emotional or behavioural problems. It had a strong academic focus, but also taught vocational subjects such as woodwork.

The school closed in 1993, at a time when a number of similar establishments in the UK were closing.

== Shawe Manor (1993) ==
Immediately after Kesgrave Hall School closed a new school opened; the fifth school based at the Hall was run by different owners, they purchased the fixtures and fittings from the old school and continued to lease the building from the founder of Kesgrave Hall School.

The headmaster, most of the staff and most of the pupils from Kesgrave Hall School transferred to the new school. According to one ex-pupil of both schools, Shawe Manor was run along the same lines as its predecessor. The school remained open less than a year before itself closed.

It is sometimes mistakenly asserted that the school was known as Grange Farm (headmaster John Williams even said, at the summer prize-giving in 1993, that he had received mail so addressed, and the error is repeated on some websites). In fact his was the name of a nearby housing development, built on the land of the same name.

== KDM (1995–2004) ==
In 1995, the timber trading company KDM moved into the building. According to their website, they converted the dining hall into "the first hi-tech timber trading room of its kind in the UK". KDM also developed an internet business, COUNTYWeb, which it sold in 2003, and also launched BT Global WoodTrader, a joint venture with BT, to trade timber over the Internet. KDM moved out of the building in 2004 into a purpose-built building at Ransomes Europark, on the southern outskirts of Ipswich.

== Ryes School (2004–2007) ==
After KDM left, the Ryes School organisation moved into the building. The Ryes is a special residential school for children with behavioural problems and other complex needs, based near Sudbury, Suffolk. Kesgrave Hall was used to house senior pupils. However, in 2007, local educational authorities decided that the site was too big and obliged the school to move the youths to smaller premises. As of 2 October 2007, a plan to house them in Pettaugh, near Stowmarket, was the subject of objections from locals who feared that they would have nothing to do outside school times.

== Milsoms Restaurant and Hotel (2007–present) ==
Hills Building Group and the Milsom Hotel Group bought the building in autumn 2007, and the East Anglian Daily Times reported on 16 October 2007 that Milsom was investing 4 million GBP in a new "restaurant with rooms" called Milsoms at Kesgrave Hall, along similar lines to the Milsom's establishment in Dedham, Essex. Among the favourable conditions was the location between Ipswich and the picturesque riverside town of Woodbridge, Suffolk.

On 28 November 2007, the East Anglian Daily Times reported that Milsom's had received planning permission from Suffolk Coastal District Council for their change of use and for their alterations. The new restaurant and hotel, 'Milsoms at Kesgrave Hall', opened in April 2008. In the first phase of works the hotel had 15 rooms, sports hall and a 100-seater restaurant. The second stage included the construction of eight extra rooms, both in the main Hall and in the outbuildings, and two further meeting rooms and they were opened in July 2009.

Kesgrave Hall has recently completed the redevelopment of the events venue called the Hangar which is able to accommodate up to 300 people for weddings and special events. The venue is also licensed by Suffolk County Council to provide Civil ceremonies.
