= Wickham Market District Ward =

Electoral ward in Suffolk, England

Wickham Market District Ward is a district ward in East Suffolk district, in Suffolk, England. From 2023 it has consisted of the following nine wards:

- Campsea Ash
- Farnham
- Hacheston
- Little Glemham
- Marlesford
- Pettistree
- Stratford St Andrew
- Wickham Market
- Ufford
