= River Fynn =

Fynn
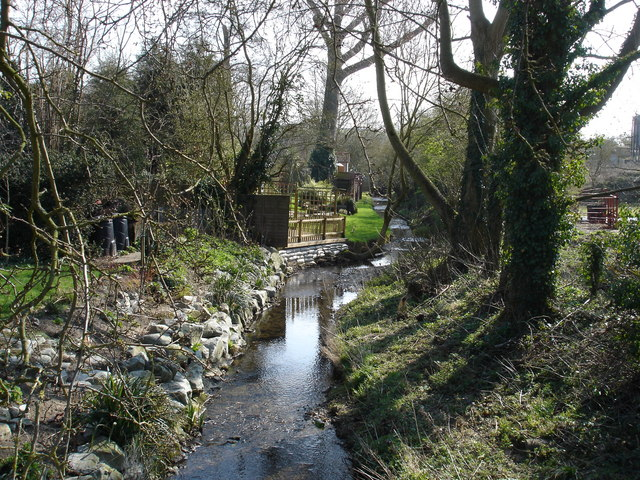

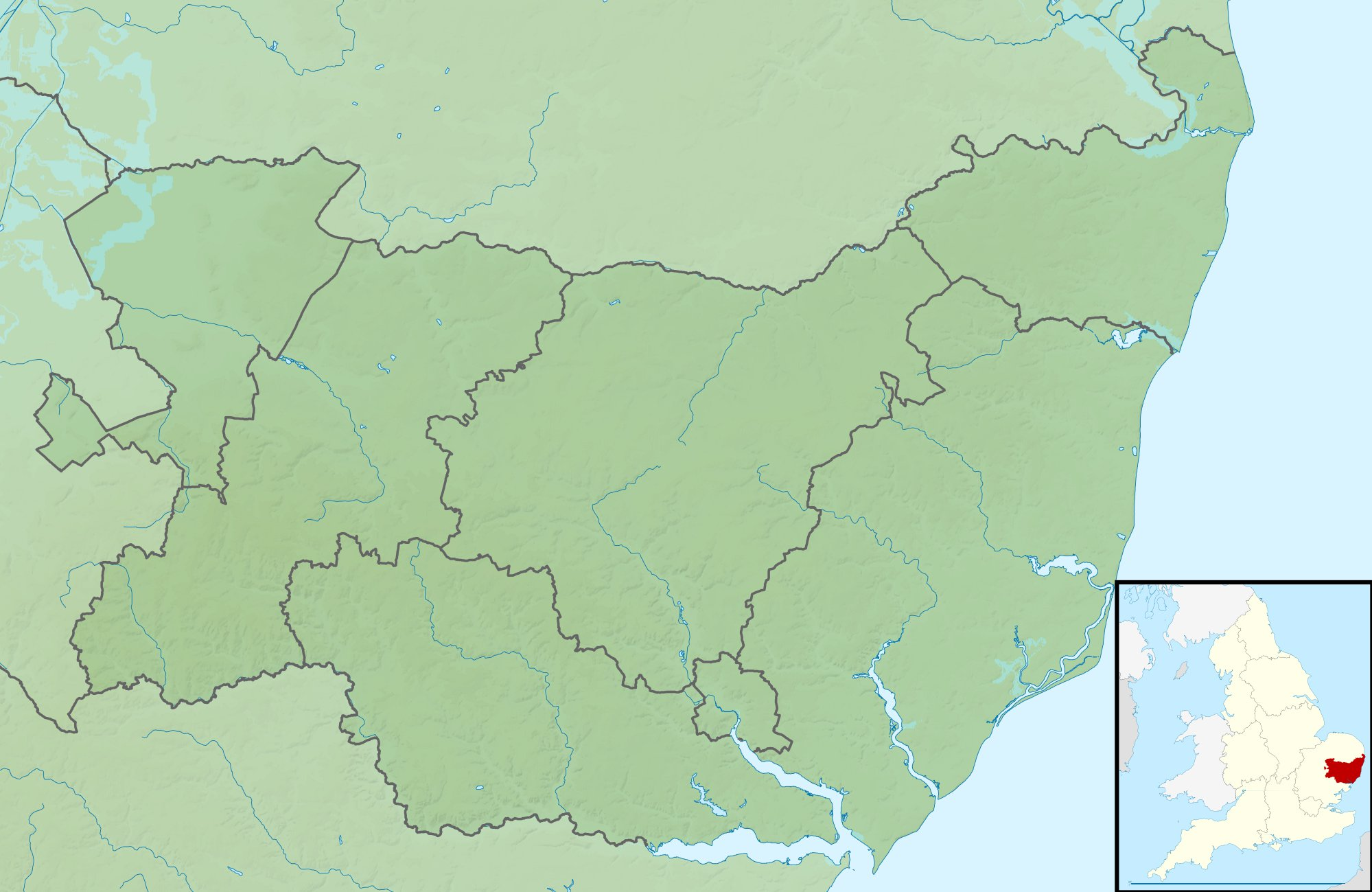
- Location of the river mouth within Suffolk

Location
- Country: England
- Region: Suffolk

Physical characteristics
- Source
  - location: Witnesham
  - coordinates: 52.2799°N 1.3048°E
  - elevation: 60 m (200 ft)
- Mouth
  - location: Martlesham
  - coordinates: 52.07667°N 1.295313°E
  - elevation: 0 m (0 ft)
- Length: 13.622 km (8.464 mi)

Basin features
- River system: River Deben
- Water Body ID: GB105035040330

The River Fynn is a waterway in Suffolk which joins the River Deben. Its source is to the north-west of the village of Witnesham and it joins the Deben south of Woodbridge, via Martlesham Creek.

Among its tributaries are the River Lark, whose sources are to the north of Grundisburgh, and an unnamed stream which flows east from a point north of the village of Kesgrave, through the grounds of Kesgrave Hall. Both join the Fynn to the west of Martlesham.
