= East Suffolk (district) =

- Non-metropolitan district
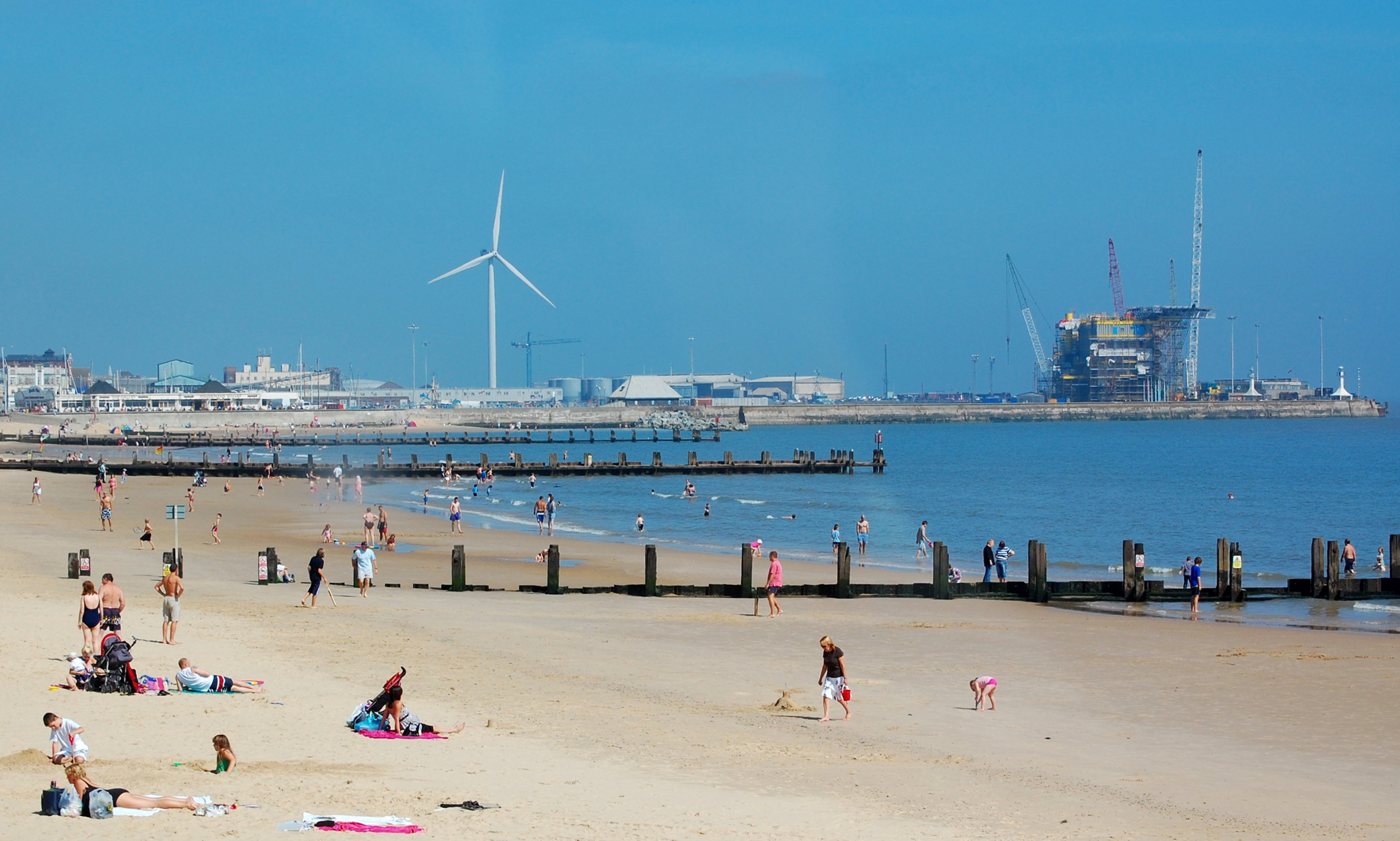
- Beach and harbour at Lowestoft, the district's largest town.

- East Suffolk district within the county of Suffolk
- Coordinates: 52.2°N 1.5°E
- Sovereign state: United Kingdom
- Constituent country: England
- Region: East of England
- Non-metropolitan county: Suffolk
- Status: Non-metropolitan district
- Admin HQ: Melton
- Incorporated: 1 April 2019

Government
  - Type: Non-metropolitan district council
  - Body: East Suffolk Council

Area
  - Total: 487 sq mi (1,261 km^{2})

Population (2021)
  - Total: 246,058
  - Density: 1,210/sq mi (469/km^{2})

Ethnicity (2021)
  - Ethnic groups: List: 96.2% White; 1.5% Mixed; 1.4% Asian; 0.6% Black; 0.4% other

Religion (2021)
  - Religion: List: 47.1% Christianity; 44.9% no religion; 7.5% other; 0.5% Islam
- Time zone: UTC0 (GMT)
  - Summer (DST): UTC+1 (BST)

East Suffolk is a local government district in Suffolk, England. The largest town is Lowestoft, which contains Ness Point, the easternmost point of the United Kingdom. The second-largest town is Felixstowe, which has the country's largest container port. On the district's south-western edge, it includes parts of the Ipswich built-up area. The rest of the district is largely rural, containing many towns and villages, including several seaside resorts. Its council is based in the village Melton. The district was formed in 2019 as a merger of the two previous districts Suffolk Coastal and Waveney. In 2021, it had a population of 246,058. It is the most populous district in the country which is not a unitary authority.

The district is on the coast, facing the North Sea. Much of the coast and adjoining areas lie within the Suffolk Coast and Heaths, a designated Area of Outstanding Natural Beauty. Some northern parts of the district lie within The Broads.

The neighbouring districts are Babergh, Ipswich, Mid Suffolk, South Norfolk and Great Yarmouth.

== History ==
The district was formed on 1 April 2019 as a merger of the two previous districts Suffolk Coastal and Waveney. The two councils had previously been working in partnership since 2008.

Although it has the same name, the modern district covers a smaller area than the former administrative county of East Suffolk, which was abolished in 1974 under the Local Government Act 1972.

In March 2026, the government announced plans to abolish the district in 2028 as part of local government reorganisation across Suffolk. These proposals were withdrawn in September 2026.

== Governance ==
East Suffolk Council

Type
- Type: Non-metropolitan district

Leadership
- Chair: Anthony Speca, Green since 24 May 2023
- Leader: Caroline Topping, Green since 24 May 2023
- Chief Executive: Chris Bally since 2022

Structure
- Seats: 55 councillors
- Political groups: Administration (26) Green (16) Liberal Democrats (9) Independent (1) Other parties (29) Conservative (15) Labour (11) Independent (3)

Elections
- Last election: 4 May 2023

Meeting place
- East Suffolk House, Station Road, Melton, Woodbridge, IP12 1RT

Website
- www.eastsuffolk.gov.uk

East Suffolk Council provides district-level services. County-level services are provided by Suffolk County Council. The whole district is also covered by civil parishes, which form a third tier of local government.

In the parts of the district within The Broads, town planning is the responsibility of the Broads Authority. The district council appoints one of its councillors to sit on that authority.

=== Political control ===
The council has been under no overall control since the 2023 election, being run by a coalition of the Greens, Liberal Democrats and an independent councillor, led by Green councillor Caroline Topping.

Political control of the council since 2019 has been as follows:

Party in control	Years
Conservative	2019–2023
No overall control	2023–present

=== Leadership ===
The leaders of the council from the council's first formal meeting in 2019 have been:

Councillor	Party	From	To
Steve Gallant	Conservative	22 May 2019	May 2023
Caroline Topping	Green	24 May 2023	

=== Composition ===
Following the 2023 election, and subsequent by-elections and changes of allegiance up to March 2026, the composition of the council was:

Party	Councillors
Green	16
Conservative	15
Labour	11
Liberal Democrats	9
Independent	4
Total	55

=== Elections ===
East Suffolk comprises 55 councillors representing 26 wards, with each ward electing one, two, or three councillors. Elections are held every four years.

=== Premises ===
The council is based at East Suffolk House, opposite Melton railway station. The building was purpose-built for the former Suffolk Coastal District Council and opened in 2016, becoming headquarters of the new East Suffolk Council following the formal merger in 2019.

== Towns and parishes ==
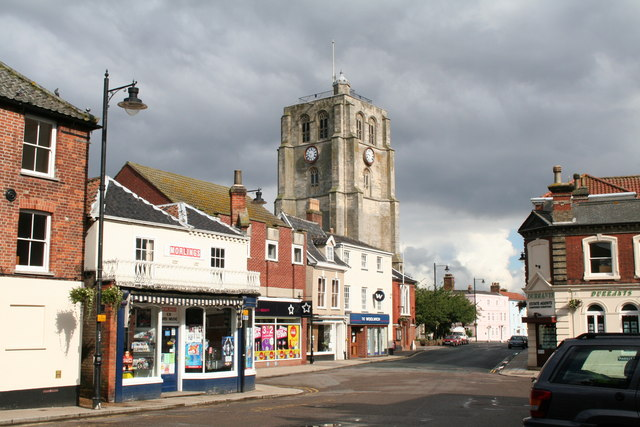
Beccles, one of the district's towns.

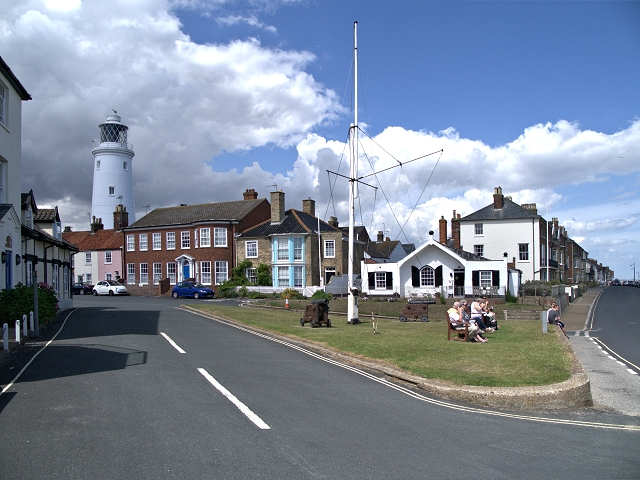
Southwold, one of the district's seaside resort towns.

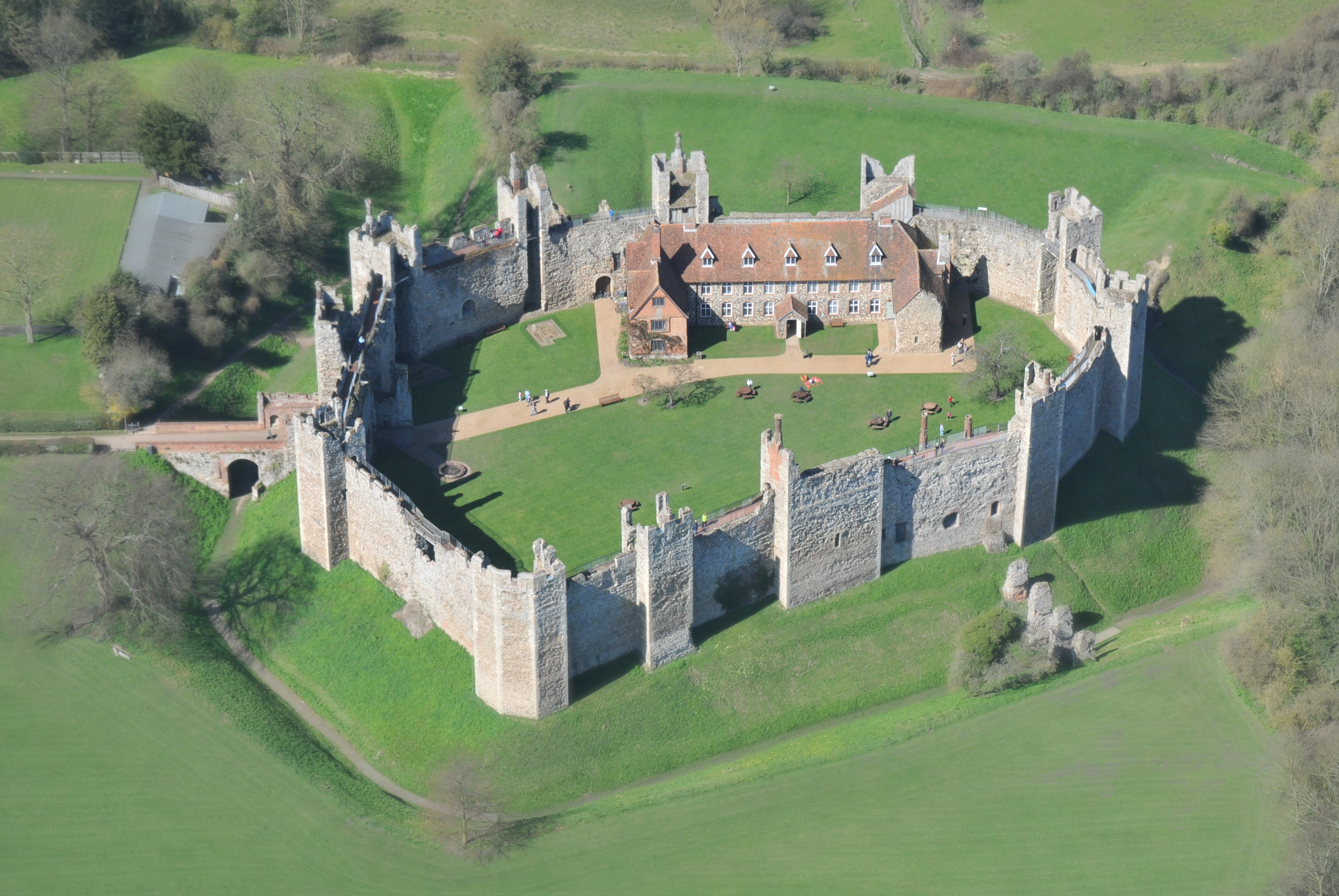
Framlingham Castle

The whole district is divided into civil parishes. Thirteen of the parish councils have declared their parishes to be towns, allowing them to take the style "town council", being:

- Aldeburgh
- Beccles
- Bungay
- Carlton Colville
- Felixstowe
- Framlingham
- Halesworth
- Kesgrave
- Leiston
- Lowestoft
- Saxmundham
- Southwold
- Woodbridge

== See also ==
- 2019 structural changes to local government in England
- West Suffolk District, another district that was created in Suffolk on 1 April 2019
