= Listed buildings in East Suffolk District =

Historic structures in East Suffolk, England

There are around 3,600 listed buildings in the East Suffolk District, England, which are buildings of architectural or historic interest.

- Grade I buildings are of exceptional interest.
- Grade II* buildings are particularly important buildings of more than special interest.
- Grade II buildings are of special interest.

The lists follow Historic England’s geographical organisation, with entries grouped by county, local authority, and parish (civil and non-civil). The following lists are arranged by parish.

Parish	List of listed buildings	Grade I	Grade II*	Grade II	Total
Aldeburgh (town)	Listed buildings in Aldeburgh				63
Alderton	Listed buildings in Alderton, Suffolk				11
Aldringham cum Thorpe	Listed buildings in Aldringham cum Thorpe				21
All Saints and St Nicholas, South Elmham	Listed buildings in All Saints and St Nicholas, South Elmham				22
Badingham	Listed buildings in Badingham				19
Barnby	Listed buildings in Barnby, Suffolk				2
Barsham	Listed buildings in Barsham, Suffolk				9
Bawdsey	Listed buildings in Bawdsey				19
Beccles (town)	Listed buildings in Beccles				149
Benacre	Listed buildings in Benacre, Suffolk				8
Benhall	Listed buildings in Benhall				35
Blaxhall	Listed buildings in Blaxhall				10
Blundeston	Listed buildings in Blundeston				7
Blyford	Listed buildings in Blyford				7
Blythburgh	Listed buildings in Blythburgh				22
Boulge	Listed buildings in Boulge				5
Boyton	Listed buildings in Boyton, Suffolk				8
Bramfield	Listed buildings in Bramfield, Suffolk				28
Brampton with Stoven	Listed buildings in Brampton with Stoven				15
Brandeston	Listed buildings in Brandeston				27
Bredfield	Listed buildings in Bredfield				17
Brightwell	Listed buildings in Brightwell, Suffolk				2
Bromeswell	Listed buildings in Bromeswell				1
Bruisyard	Listed buildings in Bruisyard				7
Bucklesham	Listed buildings in Bucklesham				6
Bungay (town)	Listed buildings in Bungay				190
Burgh	Listed buildings in Burgh, Suffolk				15
Butley	Listed buildings in Butley, Suffolk				9
Campsey Ash	Listed buildings in Campsea Ashe				13
Carlton Colville (town)	Listed buildings in Carlton Colville				8
Charsfield	Listed buildings in Charsfield				13
Chediston	Listed buildings in Chediston				21
Chillesford	Listed buildings in Chillesford				2
Clopton	Listed buildings in Clopton, Suffolk				21
Cookley	Listed buildings in Cookley, Suffolk				16
Corton	Listed buildings in Corton, Suffolk				2
Covehithe	Listed buildings in Covehithe				5
Cransford	Listed buildings in Cransford				8
Cratfield	Listed buildings in Cratfield				26
Cretingham	Listed buildings in Cretingham				22
Culpho	Listed buildings in Culpho				5
Dallinghoo	Listed buildings in Dallinghoo				14
Darsham	Listed buildings in Darsham				12
Debach	Listed buildings in Debach				6
Dennington	Listed buildings in Dennington				23
Dunwich	Listed buildings in Dunwich				12
Earl Soham	Listed buildings in Earl Soham				44
Easton	Listed buildings in Easton, Suffolk				31
Ellough	Listed buildings in Ellough				3
Eyke	Listed buildings in Eyke				8
Falkenham	Listed buildings in Falkenham				10
Farnham	Listed buildings in Farnham, Suffolk				9
Felixstowe (town)	Listed buildings in Felixstowe				38
Flixton (Lothingland); Flixton (the Saints)	Listed buildings in Flixton				9
Foxhall	Listed buildings in Foxhall, Suffolk				1
Framlingham	Listed buildings in Framlingham				137
Friston	Listed buildings in Friston				10
Frostenden	Listed buildings in Frostenden				9
Gedgrave	Listed buildings in Gedgrave				2
Gisleham	Listed buildings in Gisleham				6
Great Bealings	Listed buildings in Great Bealings				15
Great Glemham	Listed buildings in Great Glemham				26
Grundisburgh	Listed buildings in Grundisburgh				27
Hacheston	Listed buildings in Hacheston				23
Halesworth (town)	Listed buildings in Halesworth				119
Hasketon	Listed buildings in Hasketon				17
Hemley	Listed buildings in Hemley				3
Henstead with Hulver Street	Listed buildings in Henstead with Hulver Street				8
Henstead	Listed buildings in Henstead				8
Heveningham	Listed buildings in Heveningham				20
Hollesley	Listed buildings in Hollesley				6
Holton	Listed buildings in Holton, Suffolk				14
Hoo	Listed buildings in Hoo, Suffolk				11
Huntingfield	Listed buildings in Huntingfield, Suffolk				22
Iken	Listed buildings in Iken				5
Kelsale cum Carlton	Listed buildings in Kelsale cum Carlton				36
Kesgrave (town)	Listed buildings in Kesgrave				4
Kessingland	Listed buildings in Kessingland				6
Kettleburgh	Listed buildings in Kettleburgh				20
Kirton	Listed buildings in Kirton, Suffolk				9
Knodishall	Listed buildings in Knodishall				11
Leiston (town)	Listed buildings in Leiston				30
Letheringham	Listed buildings in Letheringham				12
Levington	Listed buildings in Levington				8
Linstead Magna	Listed buildings in Linstead Magna				7
Linstead Parva	Listed buildings in Linstead Parva				5
Little Bealings	Listed buildings in Little Bealings				1
Little Glemham	Listed buildings in Little Glemham				24
Lound	Listed buildings in Lound, Suffolk				5
Lowestoft (town)	Listed buildings in Lowestoft				99
Marlesford	Listed buildings in Marlesford				20
Martlesham	Listed buildings in Martlesham				17
Melton	Listed buildings in Melton, Suffolk				33
Mettingham	Listed buildings in Mettingham				13
Middleton	Listed buildings in Middleton, Suffolk				23
Monewden	Listed buildings in Monewden				10
Mutford	Listed buildings in Mutford				8
Nacton	Listed buildings in Nacton				15
Newbourne	Listed buildings in Newbourne				4
North Cove	Listed buildings in North Cove				6
Orford (town)	Listed buildings in Orford, Suffolk				51
Otley	Listed buildings in Otley, Suffolk				15
Oulton Broad	Listed buildings in Oulton Broad				6
Oulton	Listed buildings in Oulton, Suffolk				7
Parham	Listed buildings in Parham, Suffolk				22
Peasenhall	Listed buildings in Peasenhall				42
Pettistree	Listed buildings in Pettistree				14
Playford	Listed buildings in Playford, Suffolk				7
Ramsholt	Listed buildings in Ramsholt				4
Redisham	Listed buildings in Redisham				4
Rendham	Listed buildings in Rendham				10
Rendlesham	Listed buildings in Rendlesham				4
Reydon (Easton Bavents)	Listed buildings in Reydon (Easton Bavents)				14
Ringsfield	Listed buildings in Ringsfield				8
Rumburgh	Listed buildings in Rumburgh				16
Rushmere	Listed buildings in Rushmere, north Suffolk				4
Rushmere St Andrew	Listed buildings in Rushmere St Andrew				5
Saxmundham (town)	Listed buildings in Saxmundham				49
Saxtead	Listed buildings in Saxtead				23
Shadingfield	Listed buildings in Shadingfield				13
Shipmeadow	Listed buildings in Shipmeadow				5
Shottisham	Listed buildings in Shottisham				7
Sibton	Listed buildings in Sibton				22
Snape	Listed buildings in Snape, Suffolk				8
Somerleyton, Ashby and Herringfleet	Listed buildings in Somerleyton, Ashby and Herringfleet				58
Sotherton	Listed buildings in Sotherton				5
Sotterley	Listed buildings in Sotterley				13
South Cove	Listed buildings in South Cove, Suffolk				5
Southwold (town)	Listed buildings in Southwold				144
Spexhall	Listed buildings in Spexhall				17
St. Andrew, Iketshall	Listed buildings in St Andrew, Iketshall				16
St. Cross, South Elmham	Listed buildings in St Cross South Elmham				15
St. James, South Elmham	Listed buildings in St James South Elmham				10
St. John, Iketshall	Listed buildings in St John, Iketshall				3
St. Lawrence, Iketshall	Listed buildings in St Lawrence, Iketshall				6
St. Margaret, Iketshall	Listed buildings in St Margaret, Iketshall				16
St. Margaret, South Elmham	Listed buildings in St Margaret South Elmham				12
St. Mary, South Elmham Otherwise Homersfield	Listed buildings in St Mary South Elmham Otherwise Homersfield				12
St. Michael, South Elmham	Listed buildings in St Michael South Elmham				8
St. Peter, South Elmham	Listed buildings in St Peter South Elmham				5
Sternfield	Listed buildings in Sternfield				14
Stratford St Andrew	Listed buildings in Stratford St Andrew				5
Sudbourne	Listed buildings in Sudbourne				8
Sutton	Listed buildings in Sutton, Suffolk				15
Sweffling	Listed buildings in Sweffling				9
Swilland	Listed buildings in Swilland				11
Theberton	Listed buildings in Theberton				30
Thorington	Listed buildings in Thorington				15
Trimley St Martin	Listed buildings in Trimley St Martin				10
Trimley St. Mary	Listed buildings in Trimley St. Mary				13
Tuddenham St Martin	Listed buildings in Tuddenham St Martin				9
Tunstall	Listed buildings in Tunstall, Suffolk				16
Ubbeston	Listed buildings in Ubbeston				9
Ufford	Listed buildings in Ufford, Suffolk				28
Uggeshall	Listed buildings in Uggeshall				12
Walberswick	Listed buildings in Walberswick				11
Waldringfield	Listed buildings in Waldringfield				6
Walpole	Listed buildings in Walpole, Suffolk				22
Wangford with Henham	Listed buildings in Wangford with Henham				32
Wantisden	Listed buildings in Wantisden				2
Wenhaston with Mells Hamlet	Listed buildings in Wenhaston with Mells Hamlet				25
Westerfield	Listed buildings in Westerfield				8
Westhallilk	Listed buildings in Westhall				16
Westleton	Listed buildings in Westleton				19
Weston	Listed buildings in Weston, Suffolk				7
Wickham Market	Listed buildings in Wickham Market				43
Willingham St Mary	Listed buildings in Willingham St Mary				4
Wissett	Listed buildings in Wissett				29
Witnesham	Listed buildings in Witnesham				23
Woodbridge (town)	Listed buildings in Woodbridge, Suffolk				339
Worlingham	Listed buildings in Worlingham				4
Wrentham	Listed buildings in Wrentham, Suffolk				37
Yoxford	Listed buildings in Yoxford				49

== See also ==
- Grade I listed buildings in Suffolk
- Grade II* listed buildings in Suffolk

== Sources ==
- Bettely, James; Pevsner, Nikolaus (2015) [1961], Suffolk: East, The Buildings of England, New Haven and London: Yale University Press, ISBN 978-0-300-19654-2
