= Listed buildings in Suffolk =

There are around 13,300 Listed buildings in Suffolk, which are buildings of architectural or historic interest.

- Grade I buildings are of exceptional interest.
- Grade II* buildings are particularly important buildings of more than special interest.
- Grade II buildings are of special interest.

The lists follow Historic England’s geographical organisation, with entries grouped by county, local authority, and parish (civil and non-civil).

Local authority	Listed buildings list	Grade I	Grade II*	Grade II	Total	Map
Babergh	Listed buildings in Babergh District	89	186	2,730	3,005	
East Suffolk	Listed buildings in East Suffolk District	11	238	3,255	3,504	
Ipswich (non-civil parish)	Listed buildings in Ipswich	11	29	419	459	
Mid Suffolk	Listed buildings in Mid Suffolk District	88	188	3,190	3,466	
West Suffolk	Listed buildings in West Suffolk District	102	170	2,640	2,912	
Total (Suffolk)	—	301	811	12,234	13,346	—

== See also ==
- Grade I listed buildings in Suffolk
- Grade II* listed buildings in Suffolk

== Sources ==
- Bettely, James; Pevsner, Nikolaus (2015) [1961], Suffolk: East, The Buildings of England, New Haven and London: Yale University Press, ISBN 978-0-300-19654-2
- Bettely, James; Pevsner, Nikolaus (2015) [1961], Suffolk: West, The Buildings of England, New Haven and London: Yale University Press, ISBN 978-0-300-19655-9
