= Listed buildings in Wickham Market =

Civil Parish in Suffolk, England

Wickham Market is a village and civil parish in the East Suffolk District of Suffolk, England. It contains 43 listed buildings that are recorded in the National Heritage List for England. Of these four are grade II* and 39 are grade II.

This list is based on the information retrieved online from Historic England.

== Key ==
Grade	Criteria
I	Buildings that are of exceptional interest
II*	Particularly important buildings of more than special interest
II	Buildings that are of special interest

== Listing ==
Name	Grade	Location	Type	Completed (Note: The date given is the date used by Historic England as significant for the initial building or that of an important part in the structure's description.)	Date designated	Grid ref. (Note: The grid reference is based on the British national grid reference system, sometimes known as OSGB36, used by the Ordnance Survey.) Geo-coordinates	Notes	Entry number (Note: The "List Entry Number" is a unique number assigned to each listed building and scheduled monument by Historic England.)	Image	Wikidata
Church of All Saints	II*		church building		16 March 1966	TM3022855798; 52°09′09″N 1°21′50″E		1377135	Church of All Saints More images	Q17546565
Building at Rear of Valley Farmhouse	II	Charsfield Road			25 October 1984	TM2926656589; 52°09′36″N 1°21′02″E		1030832	Upload Photo	Q26282154
Valley Cottage	II	Charsfield Road			25 October 1984	TM2927356763; 52°09′41″N 1°21′03″E		1030831	Upload Photo	Q26282152
Valley Farmhouse	II	Charsfield Road			16 March 1966	TM2928056582; 52°09′36″N 1°21′03″E		1198389	Valley Farmhouse More images	Q26494321
4, Crown Lane	II	4, Crown Lane			25 October 1984	TM3023455844; 52°09′10″N 1°21′51″E		1377136	Upload Photo	Q26657622
Gelham Hall	II	Dalling Hoo Road			16 March 1966	TM2939756008; 52°09′17″N 1°21′07″E		1283865	Upload Photo	Q26572681
4, 6 and 8, Dallinghoo Road	II	4, 6 and 8, Dallinghoo Road			23 May 1994	TM3009155806; 52°09′09″N 1°21′43″E		1377144	Upload Photo	Q26657629
Glevering Bridge	II	Easton Road			19 November 1984	TM2958656571; 52°09′35″N 1°21′19″E		1199397	Upload Photo	Q26282155
Marlow	II	38, High Street			25 October 1984	TM3015855756; 52°09′08″N 1°21′47″E		1198418	Upload Photo	Q26494350
42, High Street	II	42, High Street			16 March 1966	TM3014955777; 52°09′08″N 1°21′46″E		1377137	Upload Photo	Q26657623
44, High Street	II	44, High Street			16 March 1966	TM3014555795; 52°09′09″N 1°21′46″E		1198436	44, High Street More images	Q26494365
48-50, High Street	II	48-50, High Street			16 March 1966	TM3012155802; 52°09′09″N 1°21′45″E		1030834	Upload Photo	Q26282156
Hill House (including Front Garden Wall)	II	52, High Street			16 March 1966	TM3008155827; 52°09′10″N 1°21′43″E		1198443	Upload Photo	Q26494474
54, High Street	II	54, High Street			16 March 1966	TM3009855849; 52°09′11″N 1°21′44″E		1377138	54, High Street More images	Q26657624
56, High Street	II	56, High Street			16 March 1966	TM3010655852; 52°09′11″N 1°21′44″E		1198466	56, High Street	Q26494496
The Manor House	II*	64, High Street			16 March 1966	TM3013255871; 52°09′11″N 1°21′46″E		1030835	The Manor House More images	Q17546115
66, High Street	II	66, High Street			16 March 1966	TM3014155879; 52°09′12″N 1°21′46″E		1198479	66, High Street More images	Q26494509
68 and 70 High Street	II	68 and 70, High Street			16 March 1966	TM3015255882; 52°09′12″N 1°21′47″E		1030836	68 and 70 High Street More images	Q26282157
The Grange	II	69, High Street			16 March 1966	TM3018755777; 52°09′08″N 1°21′48″E		1283813	Upload Photo	Q26572634
71, High Street	II	71, High Street			16 March 1966	TM3019055802; 52°09′09″N 1°21′49″E		1377141	Upload Photo	Q26657627
72, High Street	II	72, High Street			25 October 1984	TM3016155912; 52°09′13″N 1°21′47″E		1377139	72, High Street	Q26657625
73, High Street	II	73, High Street			25 October 1984	TM3017455808; 52°09′09″N 1°21′48″E		1283792	73, High Street	Q26572614
74 and 76, High Street	II	74 and 76, High Street			16 March 1966	TM3016155923; 52°09′13″N 1°21′47″E		1283829	Upload Photo	Q26572648
77, High Street	II	77, High Street			16 March 1966	TM3017055835; 52°09′10″N 1°21′48″E		1030840	77, High Street	Q26282161
The White Hart Inn	II*	79, High Street	inn		16 March 1966	TM3016855850; 52°09′11″N 1°21′47″E		1377142	The White Hart Inn More images	Q17546571
82 and 84, High Street	II	82 and 84, High Street			25 October 1984	TM3016755959; 52°09′14″N 1°21′48″E		1030837	Upload Photo	Q26282158
91, High Street	II	91, High Street			16 March 1966	TM3017355911; 52°09′12″N 1°21′48″E		1198637	91, High Street	Q26494430
93, High Street	II	93, High Street			16 March 1966	TM3018555932; 52°09′13″N 1°21′49″E		1030841	Upload Photo	Q26282162
The George Hotel	II	95, High Street	hotel		25 October 1984	TM3018355958; 52°09′14″N 1°21′49″E		1198640	The George Hotel More images	Q26494611
119, High Street	II	119, High Street			16 March 1966	TM3024456162; 52°09′21″N 1°21′52″E		1030842	Upload Photo	Q26282164
142-146, High Street	II	142-146, High Street			16 March 1966	TM3027756268; 52°09′24″N 1°21′54″E		1198501	Upload Photo	Q26494530
The Crooked House	II	173, High Street			16 March 1966	TM3050856380; 52°09′27″N 1°22′07″E		1198652	Upload Photo	Q26494623
177-179, High Street	II	177-179, High Street			16 March 1966	TM3052456404; 52°09′28″N 1°22′08″E		1377143	Upload Photo	Q26657628
181, High Street	II	181, High Street			16 March 1966	TM3054056418; 52°09′28″N 1°22′08″E		1198662	Upload Photo	Q26494633
183 and 187, High Street	II	183 and 187, High Street, Woodbridge, IP13 0RQ			16 March 1966	TM3055056429; 52°09′29″N 1°22′09″E		1030843	Upload Photo	Q26282165
201 and 203, High Street	II	201 and 203, High Street			25 October 1984	TM3058356453; 52°09′29″N 1°22′11″E		1198671	Upload Photo	Q26494641
The Chequers Inn	II	220, High Street			25 October 1984	TM3050956418; 52°09′28″N 1°22′07″E		1377140	The Chequers Inn More images	Q26657626
Deben Lodge	II	224, High Street			16 March 1966	TM3054556454; 52°09′29″N 1°22′09″E		1283798	Upload Photo	Q26572619
240, High Street	II	240, High Street			16 March 1966	TM3064756615; 52°09′35″N 1°22′14″E		1030838	Upload Photo	Q26282159
Bridge 20 Metres South of Wickham Mill (including Attached Railings)	II	High Street			25 October 1984	TM3065456589; 52°09′34″N 1°22′15″E		1030839	Upload Photo	Q26282160
Former Steam Mill 20 Metres South East of Wickham Mill	II	High Street			19 November 1984	TM3067456590; 52°09′34″N 1°22′16″E		1377282	Upload Photo	Q26657756
Wickham Mill	II*	High Street	mill		16 March 1966	TM3065656610; 52°09′34″N 1°22′15″E		1198526	Wickham Mill More images	Q17546336

== See also ==
- Grade I listed buildings in Suffolk
- Grade II* listed buildings in Suffolk

== Sources ==
- Bettely, James; Pevsner, Nikolaus (2015) [1961], Suffolk: East, The Buildings of England, New Haven and London: Yale University Press, ISBN 978-0-300-19654-2
