= Listed buildings in Woodbridge, Suffolk =

Civil Parish in Suffolk, England

Woodbridge is a town and civil parish in the East Suffolk District of Suffolk, England. It contains 339 listed buildings that are recorded in the National Heritage List for England. Of these four are grade I, 25 are grade II* and 310 are grade II.

This list is based on the information retrieved online from Historic England.

== Key ==
Grade	Criteria
I	Buildings that are of exceptional interest
II*	Particularly important buildings of more than special interest
II	Buildings that are of special interest

== Listing ==
Name	Grade	Location	Type	Completed (Note: The date given is the date used by Historic England as significant for the initial building or that of an important part in the structure's description.)	Date designated	Grid ref. (Note: The grid reference is based on the British national grid reference system, sometimes known as OSGB36, used by the Ordnance Survey.) Geo-coordinates	Notes	Entry number (Note: The "List Entry Number" is a unique number assigned to each listed building and scheduled monument by Historic England.)	Image	Wikidata
King's Knoll	II	IP12 4DN			21 August 2019	TM2658947673; 52°04′52″N 1°18′20″E		1464503	Upload Photo	Q66726758
1, Angel Lane	II	1, Angel Lane			20 December 1971	TM2701149203; 52°05′40″N 1°18′46″E		1031096	Upload Photo	Q26282442
3 and 5, Angel Lane	II	3 and 5, Angel Lane			20 December 1971	TM2700749213; 52°05′41″N 1°18′45″E		1377032	Upload Photo	Q26657524
8, Angel Lane	II	8, Angel Lane			20 December 1971	TM2701549227; 52°05′41″N 1°18′46″E		1031099	Upload Photo	Q26282445
10,12, Angel Lane	II	10, 12, Angel Lane			20 December 1971	TM2701049234; 52°05′41″N 1°18′46″E		1377034	Upload Photo	Q26657526
18-24, Angel Lane	II	18-24, Angel Lane			20 December 1971	TM2699149252; 52°05′42″N 1°18′45″E		1031100	Upload Photo	Q26282446
Number 21 Incorporating Former Number 19	II	21, Angel Lane			20 December 1971	TM2695749261; 52°05′42″N 1°18′43″E		1031097	Upload Photo	Q26282443
25,27, Angel Lane	II	25, 27, Angel Lane			20 December 1971	TM2694549257; 52°05′42″N 1°18′42″E		1377033	Upload Photo	Q26657525
26,28, Angel Lane	II	26, 28, Angel Lane			20 December 1971	TM2698149261; 52°05′42″N 1°18′44″E		1031101	Upload Photo	Q26282448
27, Angel Lane	II	27, Angel Lane			20 December 1971	TM2694049264; 52°05′43″N 1°18′42″E		1031098	Upload Photo	Q26282444
Seckford Hall Lodge	II	Bealings Road			16 March 1966	TM2535048406; 52°05′17″N 1°17′17″E		1377127	Upload Photo	Q26657615
2, Bredfield Street	II	2, Bredfield Street			20 December 1971	TM2694049319; 52°05′44″N 1°18′42″E		1031105	Upload Photo	Q26282452
28, Bredfield Street	II	28, Bredfield Street			20 December 1971	TM2695249414; 52°05′47″N 1°18′43″E		1031106	Upload Photo	Q26282453
29,30, Bredfield Street	II	29, 30, Bredfield Street			20 December 1971	TM2694749424; 52°05′48″N 1°18′43″E		1183083	Upload Photo	Q26478296
34-36, Bredfield Street	II	34-36, Bredfield Street			20 December 1971	TM2694749484; 52°05′50″N 1°18′43″E		1031107	Upload Photo	Q26282454
41, Bredfield Street	II	41, Bredfield Street			20 December 1971	TM2692849561; 52°05′52″N 1°18′42″E		1031104	Upload Photo	Q26282451
Waggon and Horses Inn	II	Bredfield Street			20 December 1971	TM2693149282; 52°05′43″N 1°18′42″E		1031102	Upload Photo	Q26282449
Woodbridge School	II	Bredfield Street			20 December 1971	TM2684149405; 52°05′47″N 1°18′37″E		1031103	Upload Photo	Q26282450
10, Bridgewood Road	II	10, Bridgewood Road			20 December 1971	TM2655449015; 52°05′35″N 1°18′21″E		1030983	Upload Photo	Q26282318
2-6, Brook Street	II	2-6, Brook Street			20 December 1971	TM2750048989; 52°05′33″N 1°19′11″E		1031108	Upload Photo	Q26282455
8-14, Brook Street	II	8-14, Brook Street			20 December 1971	TM2750848975; 52°05′32″N 1°19′11″E		1183108	Upload Photo	Q26478318
11-15, Brook Street	II	11-15, Brook Street			20 December 1971	TM2750848939; 52°05′31″N 1°19′11″E		1284212	Upload Photo	Q26573006
16 and 18, Brook Street	II	16 and 18, Brook Street			20 December 1971	TM2751348963; 52°05′32″N 1°19′11″E		1377036	Upload Photo	Q26657528
17, Brook Street	II	17, Brook Street			20 December 1971	TM2750748929; 52°05′31″N 1°19′11″E		1377035	Upload Photo	Q26657527
22-32, Brook Street	II	22-32, Brook Street			20 December 1971	TM2752548937; 52°05′31″N 1°19′12″E		1031109	Upload Photo	Q26282456
34, Brook Street	II	34, Brook Street			20 December 1971	TM2753348924; 52°05′31″N 1°19′12″E		1284221	Upload Photo	Q26573014
36-42, Brook Street	II	36-42, Brook Street			20 December 1971	TM2753648912; 52°05′30″N 1°19′13″E		1031110	Upload Photo	Q26282457
44, Brook Street	II	44, Brook Street			20 December 1971	TM2754148902; 52°05′30″N 1°19′13″E		1183152	Upload Photo	Q26478358
Mount Pleasant	II	1, Burkitt Road			20 December 1971	TM2681249182; 52°05′40″N 1°18′35″E		1377012	Upload Photo	Q26657509
15-21, Burkitt Road	II	15-21, Burkitt Road			20 December 1971	TM2651149322; 52°05′45″N 1°18′20″E		1183159	Upload Photo	Q26478363
33, Burkitt Road	II	33, Burkitt Road			20 December 1971	TM2643649356; 52°05′46″N 1°18′16″E		1031111	Upload Photo	Q26282459
Buttrums Mill	II*	Burkitt Road	mill		25 January 1951	TM2644049300; 52°05′44″N 1°18′16″E		1377013	Buttrums Mill More images	Q5003132
St Johns House (little Castle)	II	2, Castle Street			20 December 1971	TM2735049281; 52°05′42″N 1°19′04″E		1183220	Upload Photo	Q26478419
Stella House	II	78, Castle Street			20 December 1971	TM2718949363; 52°05′45″N 1°18′55″E		1031112	Upload Photo	Q26282460
80-94, Castle Street	II	80-94, Castle Street			20 December 1971	TM2715749370; 52°05′46″N 1°18′54″E		1284155	Upload Photo	Q26572953
87, Castle Street	II	87, Castle Street			20 December 1971	TM2696749551; 52°05′52″N 1°18′44″E		1031074	Upload Photo	Q26282419
96,98, Castle Street	II	96, 98, Castle Street			20 December 1971	TM2713849376; 52°05′46″N 1°18′53″E		1377014	Upload Photo	Q26657510
112-118, Castle Street	II	112-118, Castle Street			20 December 1971	TM2705049429; 52°05′48″N 1°18′48″E		1031113	Upload Photo	Q26282461
136,138, Castle Street	II	136, 138, Castle Street			25 January 1951	TM2700849511; 52°05′50″N 1°18′46″E		1183246	Upload Photo	Q26478443
140, Castle Street	II	140, Castle Street			20 December 1971	TM2698349547; 52°05′52″N 1°18′45″E		1377020	Upload Photo	Q26657515
1, Chapel Street	II	1, Chapel Street			20 December 1971	TM2705149218; 52°05′41″N 1°18′48″E		1031075	Upload Photo	Q26282420
3,5, Chapel Street	II	3, 5, Chapel Street			20 December 1971	TM2703149250; 52°05′42″N 1°18′47″E		1031076	Upload Photo	Q26282421
7,9, Chapel Street	II	7, 9, Chapel Street			20 December 1971	TM2702149259; 52°05′42″N 1°18′46″E		1377022	Upload Photo	Q26657517
Burkitt House	II*	30, Chapel Street			25 January 1951	TM2696849279; 52°05′43″N 1°18′44″E		1031077	Upload Photo	Q17546227
Beaumont Chapel (baptist)	II	Chapel Street			20 December 1971	TM2706449226; 52°05′41″N 1°18′49″E		1377021	Upload Photo	Q26657516
Garden Wall of Burkitt House	II	Chapel Street			20 December 1971	TM2698249274; 52°05′43″N 1°18′44″E		1031078	Upload Photo	Q26282424
Pump in Garden of Burkitt House	II	Chapel Street			20 December 1971	TM2697349294; 52°05′43″N 1°18′44″E		1031079	Upload Photo	Q26282425
Stable Building of Burkitt House	II	Chapel Street			20 December 1971	TM2694549292; 52°05′43″N 1°18′42″E		1377023	Upload Photo	Q26657518
1,1b, Church Street	II	1, 1b, Church Street			20 December 1971	TM2725348982; 52°05′33″N 1°18′58″E		1377025	Upload Photo	Q26657519
The Cross Inn	II	2, Church Street	inn		25 January 1951	TM2726848990; 52°05′33″N 1°18′59″E		1031087	The Cross Inn More images	Q26282433
Deben Tea Rooms	II	3, Church Street			20 December 1971	TM2724348992; 52°05′33″N 1°18′57″E		1183349	Upload Photo	Q26478543
Barclays Bank	II*	4, Church Street			25 January 1951	TM2726448998; 52°05′33″N 1°18′58″E		1031088	Upload Photo	Q17546233
5, Church Street	II	5, Church Street			25 January 1951	TM2724049003; 52°05′34″N 1°18′57″E		1377026	Upload Photo	Q26657520
Suffolk Seed Store	II	6, Church Street			25 January 1951	TM2725749011; 52°05′34″N 1°18′58″E		1198072	Upload Photo	Q26492521
9, Church Street	II	9, Church Street			25 January 1951	TM2722349020; 52°05′34″N 1°18′56″E		1031082	Upload Photo	Q26282428
Turn Close	II	11, Church Street			25 January 1951	TM2719549050; 52°05′35″N 1°18′55″E		1031083	Upload Photo	Q26282429
12, Church Street	II*	12, Church Street	building		26 May 1953	TM2722549045; 52°05′35″N 1°18′57″E		1377027	12, Church Street More images	Q17546539
13, Church Street	II	13, Church Street			25 January 1951	TM2718049055; 52°05′35″N 1°18′54″E		1284065	Upload Photo	Q26572870
14, Church Street	II	14, Church Street			20 December 1971	TM2721849052; 52°05′35″N 1°18′56″E		1031090	Upload Photo	Q26282435
16, Church Street	II	16, Church Street			20 December 1971	TM2721249057; 52°05′35″N 1°18′56″E		1198090	Upload Photo	Q26492542
18, Church Street	II	18, Church Street			20 December 1971	TM2720449061; 52°05′36″N 1°18′55″E		1031091	Upload Photo	Q26282436
20, Church Street	II	20, Church Street			25 January 1951	TM2719249065; 52°05′36″N 1°18′55″E		1283982	Upload Photo	Q26572792
21, Church Street	II	21, Church Street			20 December 1971	TM2714949068; 52°05′36″N 1°18′53″E		1031084	Upload Photo	Q26282431
St Withburga	II	22, Church Street	architectural structure		25 January 1951	TM2718549069; 52°05′36″N 1°18′54″E		1377028	St Withburga More images	Q26657521
23, Church Street	II	23, Church Street			25 January 1951	TM2714349074; 52°05′36″N 1°18′52″E		1284040	Upload Photo	Q26572847
24, Church Street	II	24, Church Street			20 December 1971	TM2717649073; 52°05′36″N 1°18′54″E		1031092	Upload Photo	Q26282437
25, Church Street	II	25, Church Street			25 January 1951	TM2713549078; 52°05′36″N 1°18′52″E		1031085	Upload Photo	Q26282432
26, Church Street	II	26, Church Street			25 January 1951	TM2716849077; 52°05′36″N 1°18′54″E		1198170	Upload Photo	Q26494130
30, Church Street	II	30, Church Street			25 January 1951	TM2713949094; 52°05′37″N 1°18′52″E		1031093	Upload Photo	Q26282438
32, Church Street	II	32, Church Street			25 January 1951	TM2713749103; 52°05′37″N 1°18′52″E		1198185	Upload Photo	Q26494142
34, Church Street	II*	34, Church Street			25 January 1951	TM2713649112; 52°05′37″N 1°18′52″E		1031094	Upload Photo	Q17546240
36, Church Street	II	36, Church Street			20 December 1971	TM2713549121; 52°05′38″N 1°18′52″E		1198199	Upload Photo	Q26494155
1a, Church Street	II	1a, Church Street			20 December 1971	TM2724748986; 52°05′33″N 1°18′58″E		1031081	Upload Photo	Q26282427
28b,28c,28d, Church Street	II	28b, 28c, 28d, Church Street			20 December 1971	TM2715249087; 52°05′37″N 1°18′53″E		1377029	Upload Photo	Q26657522
Churchyard Walls of St Marys Church, Gate Piers, Gate, Railings and Bollards	II	Church Street			20 December 1971	TM2711249112; 52°05′37″N 1°18′51″E		1031080	Upload Photo	Q26282426
Antiques	II	Church Street			20 December 1971	TM2723649039; 52°05′35″N 1°18′57″E		1198084	Upload Photo	Q26492537
Church of St Mary	I	Church Street	church building		25 January 1951	TM2706849088; 52°05′37″N 1°18′48″E		1377024	Church of St Mary More images	Q17527199
Entrance Wall, Piers and Gates of the Abbey	II	Church Street			20 December 1971	TM2712749082; 52°05′36″N 1°18′51″E		1198041	Upload Photo	Q26492489
Former No 8 Now Incorporated with No 6 (suffolk Seed Store)	II	Church Street			20 December 1971	TM2724149030; 52°05′35″N 1°18′57″E		1031089	Upload Photo	Q26282434
Paget House (main Portion)	II	Church Street			25 January 1951	TM2723749009; 52°05′34″N 1°18′57″E		1183380	Upload Photo	Q26478572
The Abbey (junior School)	II*	Church Street	school building		25 January 1951	TM2709449046; 52°05′35″N 1°18′50″E		1031086	The Abbey (junior School) More images	Q17546231
Marston House	II	6, Cumberland Street	house		25 January 1951	TM2720248938; 52°05′32″N 1°18′55″E		1031058	Marston House More images	Q26282402
Gordon House	II*	8, Cumberland Street			25 January 1951	TM2719348930; 52°05′31″N 1°18′55″E		1377051	Upload Photo	Q17546558
10, Cumberland Street	II	10, Cumberland Street			20 December 1971	TM2717848916; 52°05′31″N 1°18′54″E		1198334	Upload Photo	Q26494283
12, Cumberland Street	II	12, Cumberland Street			20 December 1971	TM2717248911; 52°05′31″N 1°18′53″E		1031059	Upload Photo	Q26282403
14, Cumberland Street	II	14, Cumberland Street			20 December 1971	TM2716748907; 52°05′31″N 1°18′53″E		1198393	Upload Photo	Q26494325
16 and 18, Cumberland Street	II	16 and 18, Cumberland Street			20 December 1971	TM2716148900; 52°05′30″N 1°18′53″E		1377052	Upload Photo	Q26657541
Cumberland House	II*	17, Cumberland Street	house		25 January 1951	TM2720648926; 52°05′31″N 1°18′55″E		1377031	Cumberland House More images	Q17546546
Bartons Cottage	II	23, Cumberland Street			25 January 1951	TM2716948888; 52°05′30″N 1°18′53″E		1031052	Upload Photo	Q26282396
The Manor House	II*	25 and 27, Cumberland Street			25 January 1951	TM2716148886; 52°05′30″N 1°18′53″E		1377047	Upload Photo	Q17546553
The Hermitage	II*	29, Cumberland Street	architectural structure		25 January 1951	TM2714148873; 52°05′30″N 1°18′52″E		1031053	The Hermitage More images	Q17546213
30, Cumberland Street	II	30, Cumberland Street			25 January 1951	TM2709948868; 52°05′30″N 1°18′49″E		1031060	Upload Photo	Q26282404
31, Cumberland Street	II	31, Cumberland Street			20 December 1971	TM2713048868; 52°05′29″N 1°18′51″E		1031054	Upload Photo	Q26282398
Townley House	II	32 and 34, Cumberland Street			25 January 1951	TM2708648858; 52°05′29″N 1°18′49″E		1198404	Upload Photo	Q26494336
Brook House	II*	36, Cumberland Street			25 January 1951	TM2706548854; 52°05′29″N 1°18′48″E		1031061	Upload Photo	Q17546216
The Cottage	II	38, Cumberland Street			20 December 1971	TM2702348883; 52°05′30″N 1°18′46″E		1198427	Upload Photo	Q26494358
Newby House	II	40, Cumberland Street			25 January 1951	TM2704248834; 52°05′28″N 1°18′46″E		1031062	Upload Photo	Q26282405
Clock House	II*	42, Cumberland Street			25 January 1951	TM2702548825; 52°05′28″N 1°18′46″E		1031063	Upload Photo	Q17546220
The Moorings the Old Malting House	II	43, Cumberland Street			26 May 1953	TM2708148835; 52°05′28″N 1°18′48″E		1377048	Upload Photo	Q26657538
Red House	II*	44, Cumberland Street	house		25 January 1951	TM2699848806; 52°05′28″N 1°18′44″E		1198453	Red House More images	Q17546330
45, Cumberland Street	II	45, Cumberland Street			20 December 1971	TM2706448828; 52°05′28″N 1°18′48″E		1031055	Upload Photo	Q26282399
Penrith House	II	58, Cumberland Street			25 January 1951	TM2696648776; 52°05′27″N 1°18′42″E		1031064	Upload Photo	Q26282406
60, Cumberland Street	II	60, Cumberland Street			20 December 1971	TM2695848769; 52°05′27″N 1°18′42″E		1031065	Upload Photo	Q26282408
62, Cumberland Street	II	62, Cumberland Street			20 December 1971	TM2695148765; 52°05′26″N 1°18′41″E		1198474	Upload Photo	Q26494504
68, Cumberland Street	II	68, Cumberland Street			20 December 1971	TM2693048751; 52°05′26″N 1°18′40″E		1031066	Upload Photo	Q26282409
Westholme	II	71, Cumberland Street			25 January 1951	TM2695148740; 52°05′26″N 1°18′41″E		1377049	Upload Photo	Q26657539
Cherry Tree Inn	II	73, Cumberland Street			20 December 1971	TM2686348682; 52°05′24″N 1°18′37″E		1031056	Upload Photo	Q26282400
74, Cumberland Street	II	74, Cumberland Street			20 December 1971	TM2689748762; 52°05′26″N 1°18′39″E		1198493	Upload Photo	Q26494522
76 and 78 Cumberland Street	II	76 and 78, Cumberland Street			20 December 1971	TM2689148730; 52°05′25″N 1°18′38″E		1031067	Upload Photo	Q26282410
77, Cumberland Street	II	77, Cumberland Street			20 December 1971	TM2684248671; 52°05′24″N 1°18′36″E		1031057	Upload Photo	Q26282401
79, Cumberland Street	II	79, Cumberland Street			20 December 1971	TM2683848668; 52°05′23″N 1°18′35″E		1377050	Upload Photo	Q26657540
86-90, Cumberland Street	II	86-90, Cumberland Street			20 December 1971	TM2688348721; 52°05′25″N 1°18′38″E		1377053	Upload Photo	Q26657542
Alpha Cottage	II	92, Cumberland Street			20 December 1971	TM2687148714; 52°05′25″N 1°18′37″E		1198514	Upload Photo	Q26494543
Athenrye Court (flats)	II	Cumberland Street			25 January 1951	TM2720648893; 52°05′30″N 1°18′55″E		1377046	Upload Photo	Q26657537
Eden Lodge (urban District Council Offices)	II	Cumberland Street			20 December 1971	TM2727048909; 52°05′31″N 1°18′59″E		1031095	Upload Photo	Q26282440
The Post Office (on Site of Portland House)	II	Cumberland Street			29 July 1970	TM2722148932; 52°05′31″N 1°18′56″E		1198208	Upload Photo	Q26494162
Brick Kiln Cottage	II	42, Deben Road, IP12 1AZ			20 December 1971	TM2775549277; 52°05′42″N 1°19′25″E		1031068	Upload Photo	Q26282412
Ivy Lodge	II	1, Doric Place			25 January 1951	TM2734448996; 52°05′33″N 1°19′03″E		1031069	Upload Photo	Q26282413
Doric Lodge	II	2, Doric Place			25 January 1951	TM2735249004; 52°05′34″N 1°19′03″E		1283805	Upload Photo	Q26572626
3,4, Doric Place	II	3, 4, Doric Place			20 December 1971	TM2738148982; 52°05′33″N 1°19′05″E		1377054	Upload Photo	Q26657543
11, Doric Place	II	11, Doric Place			20 December 1971	TM2752448890; 52°05′30″N 1°19′12″E		1198548	Upload Photo	Q26494575
Westmoreland Cottage	II	4, Drybridge Hill			20 December 1971	TM2645749123; 52°05′39″N 1°18′16″E		1198591	Upload Photo	Q26494387
10, Drybridge Hill	II	10, Drybridge Hill			20 December 1971	TM2642449082; 52°05′37″N 1°18′15″E		1377055	Upload Photo	Q26657544
22-26, Drybridge Hill	II	22-26, Drybridge Hill			20 December 1971	TM2639949054; 52°05′37″N 1°18′13″E		1031071	Upload Photo	Q26282415
Drybridge Lodge	II	52, Drybridge Hill			20 December 1971	TM2635748998; 52°05′35″N 1°18′11″E		1283771	Upload Photo	Q26572595
Formerly the Sick House	II	74, Grundisburgh Road			20 December 1971	TM2575549370; 52°05′48″N 1°17′40″E		1031072	Upload Photo	Q26282416
76, Grundisburgh Road	II	76, Grundisburgh Road			20 December 1971	TM2574949396; 52°05′49″N 1°17′40″E		1198645	Upload Photo	Q26494616
Grove Cottage	II	17, Hasketon Road			20 December 1971	TM2619949583; 52°05′54″N 1°18′04″E		1377056	Upload Photo	Q26657545
Farlingaye Hall	II	50, Hasketon Road			25 January 1951	TM2615849756; 52°06′00″N 1°18′02″E		1031073	Upload Photo	Q26282417
Kingston Cottage	II	34, Kingston Road			20 December 1971	TM2705448738; 52°05′25″N 1°18′47″E		1031029	Upload Photo	Q26282372
Barn at Kingston Farm to South East of the Farmhouse	II	Kingston Road			20 December 1971	TM2699048432; 52°05′16″N 1°18′43″E		1031030	Upload Photo	Q26282373
Kingston Farmhouse	II	Kingston Road			25 January 1951	TM2698548450; 52°05′16″N 1°18′43″E		1377075	Upload Photo	Q26657563
Formerly St Annes School	II	1, Market Hill			25 January 1951	TM2709849119; 52°05′38″N 1°18′50″E		1377038	Upload Photo	Q26657529
The Bull Hotel	II	2, Market Hill	hotel		25 January 1951	TM2713949132; 52°05′38″N 1°18′52″E		1377030	The Bull Hotel More images	Q26657523
3,5, Market Hill	II	3, 5, Market Hill			25 January 1951	TM2709549126; 52°05′38″N 1°18′50″E		1031032	Upload Photo	Q26282375
The Old Court House	II*	4, Market Hill			25 January 1951	TM2712249147; 52°05′38″N 1°18′51″E		1031037	Upload Photo	Q17546198
6, Market Hill	II	6, Market Hill			20 December 1971	TM2711549150; 52°05′39″N 1°18′51″E		1198820	Upload Photo	Q26494779
7, Market Hill	II	7, Market Hill			25 January 1951	TM2708249126; 52°05′38″N 1°18′49″E		1031033	Upload Photo	Q26282376
8-12, Market Hill	II	8-12, Market Hill			25 January 1951	TM2710549152; 52°05′39″N 1°18′50″E		1377042	Upload Photo	Q26657533
9,11, Market Hill	II	9, 11, Market Hill			25 January 1951	TM2707249127; 52°05′38″N 1°18′49″E		1377039	Upload Photo	Q26657530
14, Market Hill	II	14, Market Hill			25 January 1951	TM2709549155; 52°05′39″N 1°18′50″E		1199416	Upload Photo	Q26495302
Seckford House	II	15, Market Hill			25 January 1951	TM2702549126; 52°05′38″N 1°18′46″E		1377040	Upload Photo	Q26657531
16, Market Hill	II	16, Market Hill			20 December 1971	TM2708949162; 52°05′39″N 1°18′50″E		1031038	Upload Photo	Q26282382
Kings Head Inn	II	17, Market Hill	inn		25 January 1951	TM2701749144; 52°05′39″N 1°18′46″E		1031035	Kings Head Inn More images	Q26282380
18-24, Market Hill	II	18-24, Market Hill			25 January 1951	TM2708749167; 52°05′39″N 1°18′50″E		1031039	Upload Photo	Q26282383
19, Market Hill	II	19, Market Hill			25 January 1951	TM2702449152; 52°05′39″N 1°18′46″E		1031036	Upload Photo	Q26282381
21, Market Hill	II	21, Market Hill			25 January 1951	TM2702649158; 52°05′39″N 1°18′46″E		1198817	Upload Photo	Q26494776
23, Market Hill	II	23, Market Hill			25 January 1951	TM2702849168; 52°05′39″N 1°18′46″E		1377041	Upload Photo	Q26657532
Deben Gallery	II	26, Market Hill			20 December 1971	TM2706749172; 52°05′39″N 1°18′49″E		1031040	Upload Photo	Q26282384
28,30, Market Hill	II*	28, 30, Market Hill			25 January 1951	TM2706049174; 52°05′39″N 1°18′48″E		1031041	Upload Photo	Q17546204
32,38, Market Hill	II*	32, 38, Market Hill			25 January 1951	TM2704449178; 52°05′40″N 1°18′47″E		1199454	Upload Photo	Q17546392
Glovers Yard	II	34, 36, Market Hill			20 December 1971	TM2704149209; 52°05′41″N 1°18′47″E		1031042	Upload Photo	Q26282386
40,42, Market Hill	II	40, 42, Market Hill			20 December 1971	TM2703149183; 52°05′40″N 1°18′47″E		1031043	Upload Photo	Q26282387
44, Market Hill	II	44, Market Hill			20 December 1971	TM2702249187; 52°05′40″N 1°18′46″E		1031044	Upload Photo	Q26282390
20a, Market Hill	II	20a, Market Hill			20 December 1971	TM2708449170; 52°05′39″N 1°18′49″E		1199431	Upload Photo	Q26495315
Glovers Yard	II	38a, Market Hill			20 December 1971	TM2704249197; 52°05′40″N 1°18′47″E		1199465	Upload Photo	Q26678842
Northgate	II	13a, Market Hill			25 January 1951	TM2704949129; 52°05′38″N 1°18′47″E		1031034	Upload Photo	Q26282379
The Shire Hall and Corn Exchange	I	Market Hill	corn exchange		25 January 1951	TM2707949146; 52°05′39″N 1°18′49″E		1377037	The Shire Hall and Corn Exchange More images	Q17527203
Woodbridge War Memorial	II	Market Hill, IP12 4LP	war memorial		11 October 2021	TM2710949118; 52°05′38″N 1°18′51″E		1477577	Woodbridge War Memorial More images	Q104813486
K6 Telephone Kiosk	II	Market Square			24 January 1989	TM2710649125; 52°05′38″N 1°18′50″E		1377098	Upload Photo	Q26657587
1, New Street	II	1, New Street			20 December 1971	TM2741749077; 52°05′36″N 1°19′07″E		1199474	Upload Photo	Q26495355
10 and 12, New Street	II	10 and 12, New Street, IP12 1DU			20 December 1971	TM2740049159; 52°05′38″N 1°19′06″E		1031047	Upload Photo	Q26282391
18-22, New Street	II	18-22, New Street			20 December 1971	TM2736049193; 52°05′40″N 1°19′04″E		1199496	Upload Photo	Q26495373
24, New Street	II	24, New Street			20 December 1971	TM2734749198; 52°05′40″N 1°19′03″E		1377043	Upload Photo	Q26657534
25-35, New Street	II	25-35, New Street			23 August 1984	TM2736949170; 52°05′39″N 1°19′04″E		1030911	Upload Photo	Q26282238
34, New Street	II	34, New Street			20 December 1971	TM2731049188; 52°05′40″N 1°19′01″E		1031048	Upload Photo	Q26282392
36,38, New Street	II	36, 38, New Street			20 December 1971	TM2730249187; 52°05′40″N 1°19′01″E		1199517	Upload Photo	Q26495392
39, New Street	II	39, New Street			30 October 1980	TM2735549179; 52°05′39″N 1°19′04″E		1030949	Upload Photo	Q26282279
41,43, New Street	II	41, 43, New Street			30 October 1980	TM2734749181; 52°05′39″N 1°19′03″E		1377076	Upload Photo	Q26657564
45-49, New Street	II	45-49, New Street			30 October 1980	TM2733549182; 52°05′39″N 1°19′03″E		1360940	Upload Photo	Q26642981
46-50, New Street	II	46-50, New Street			20 December 1971	TM2727449177; 52°05′39″N 1°18′59″E		1377044	Upload Photo	Q26657535
51, New Street	II	51, New Street			30 October 1980	TM2732449180; 52°05′39″N 1°19′02″E		1030950	Upload Photo	Q26282280
52,54, New Street	II	52, 54, New Street			20 December 1971	TM2725149172; 52°05′39″N 1°18′58″E		1031049	Upload Photo	Q26282393
53,55, New Street	II	53, 55, New Street			30 October 1980	TM2731849178; 52°05′39″N 1°19′02″E		1074899	Upload Photo	Q26337473
56,58, New Street	II	56, 58, New Street			20 December 1971	TM2724249169; 52°05′39″N 1°18′58″E		1283331	Upload Photo	Q26572198
57,59, New Street	II	57, 59, New Street			30 October 1980	TM2730949173; 52°05′39″N 1°19′01″E		1030951	Upload Photo	Q26282281
60, New Street	II	60, New Street			20 December 1971	TM2723549168; 52°05′39″N 1°18′57″E		1031050	Upload Photo	Q26282394
61, New Street	II	61, New Street			30 October 1980	TM2730149170; 52°05′39″N 1°19′01″E		1377097	Upload Photo	Q26657586
Roycroft	II	62, New Street			25 January 1951	TM2722449166; 52°05′39″N 1°18′57″E		1283337	Upload Photo	Q26572203
72,74, New Street	II	72, 74, New Street			20 December 1971	TM2716349154; 52°05′39″N 1°18′54″E		1377045	Upload Photo	Q26657536
76, New Street	II	76, New Street			20 December 1971	TM2715649153; 52°05′39″N 1°18′53″E		1031051	Upload Photo	Q26282395
Lynchester House	II	78, New Street			20 December 1971	TM2714749155; 52°05′39″N 1°18′53″E		1199586	Upload Photo	Q26495456
The Bridewell	II*	91 and 93, New Street	architectural structure		25 January 1951	TM2725049154; 52°05′39″N 1°18′58″E		1031045	The Bridewell More images	Q17546208
105,107, New Street	II	105, 107, New Street			20 December 1971	TM2718949140; 52°05′38″N 1°18′55″E		1199488	Upload Photo	Q26495366
The Old Bell and Steelyard Inn	I	New Street	inn		25 January 1951	TM2720449145; 52°05′38″N 1°18′56″E		1031046	The Old Bell and Steelyard Inn More images	Q17527076
Pound Square	II	1, North Hill			26 May 1953	TM2696349588; 52°05′53″N 1°18′44″E		1377064	Upload Photo	Q26657552
Formerly the Grapes Inn	II	3, North Hill			20 December 1971	TM2696449605; 52°05′54″N 1°18′44″E		1031007	Upload Photo	Q26282347
Little Grange	II	Pytches Road			25 January 1951	TM2743649472; 52°05′49″N 1°19′09″E		1377065	Upload Photo	Q26657553
1-5, Quay Side	II*	1-5, Quay Side	building		20 December 1971	TM2738348832; 52°05′28″N 1°19′04″E		1031008	1-5, Quay Side More images	Q17546190
The Ferry House	II	7, Quay Side			25 January 1951	TM2741648839; 52°05′28″N 1°19′06″E		1377066	Upload Photo	Q26657554
The Boat (former Inn)	II	12, Quay Side			25 January 1951	TM2746448829; 52°05′28″N 1°19′09″E		1031010	Upload Photo	Q26282349
14,16, Quay Side	II	14, 16, Quay Side			25 January 1951	TM2750448834; 52°05′28″N 1°19′11″E		1377067	Upload Photo	Q26657555
Plaidy	II	2, Quay Street			20 December 1971	TM2735248867; 52°05′29″N 1°19′03″E		1031012	Upload Photo	Q26282351
Cambridge House	II	4 and 6, Quay Street			25 January 1951	TM2735748860; 52°05′29″N 1°19′03″E		1031013	Upload Photo	Q26282352
5, Quay Street	II	5, Quay Street			20 December 1971	TM2732148878; 52°05′30″N 1°19′01″E		1377069	Upload Photo	Q26657557
11-17, Quay Street	II	11-17, Quay Street			20 December 1971	TM2734348853; 52°05′29″N 1°19′02″E		1031014	Upload Photo	Q26282353
The Station Hotel	II	19, Quay Street	hotel		25 January 1951	TM2735248831; 52°05′28″N 1°19′03″E		1199715	The Station Hotel More images	Q26495577
Assembly Room (formerly Granary of the Crown Hotel)	II	Quay Street			20 December 1971	TM2732548908; 52°05′30″N 1°19′01″E		1031011	Upload Photo	Q26282350
Congregational Church	II	Quay Street	church building		25 January 1951	TM2734748880; 52°05′30″N 1°19′03″E		1377068	Congregational Church More images	Q26657556
16-20 Quayside	II	16-20, Quayside, IP12 1BH			25 January 1951	TM2744748829; 52°05′28″N 1°19′08″E		1031009	Upload Photo	Q26282348
Fairfield	II	7, Queen's Head Lane			20 December 1971	TM2681649139; 52°05′39″N 1°18′35″E		1377070	Upload Photo	Q26657558
12 Queens Head Lane	II	12, Queens Head Lane			20 December 1971	TM2683649175; 52°05′40″N 1°18′36″E		1199802	Upload Photo	Q26495659
14 Queens Head Lane	II	14, Queens Head Lane			20 December 1971	TM2683949183; 52°05′40″N 1°18′37″E		1031015	Upload Photo	Q26282354
Creek Farm	II	Sandy Farm			20 December 1971	TM2604247600; 52°04′50″N 1°17′51″E		1199932	Upload Photo	Q26495777
1,3, Seckford Street	II	1, 3, Seckford Street			25 January 1951	TM2700949124; 52°05′38″N 1°18′45″E		1031023	Upload Photo	Q26282364
Seckford Lodge with Attached Outbuildings	II	7, Seckford Street			25 January 1951	TM2695549113; 52°05′38″N 1°18′43″E		1199990	Upload Photo	Q26495832
8,10, Seckford Street	II	8, 10, Seckford Street			20 December 1971	TM2696149129; 52°05′38″N 1°18′43″E		1377093	Upload Photo	Q26657582
Priory Lodge	II	9, Seckford Street			25 January 1951	TM2693749111; 52°05′38″N 1°18′42″E		1031024	Upload Photo	Q26282365
14, Seckford Street	II	14, Seckford Street			20 December 1971	TM2694349158; 52°05′39″N 1°18′42″E		1030984	Upload Photo	Q26282319
15,17, Seckford Street	II	15, 17, Seckford Street			25 January 1951	TM2691749106; 52°05′37″N 1°18′41″E		1377072	Upload Photo	Q26657560
16-22 Seckford Street	II	16-22, Seckford Street			20 December 1971	TM2694549127; 52°05′38″N 1°18′42″E		1030985	Upload Photo	Q26282320
19,21, Seckford Street	II	19, 21, Seckford Street			20 December 1971	TM2691049104; 52°05′37″N 1°18′40″E		1300981	Upload Photo	Q26588251
23,25, Seckford Street	II	23, 25, Seckford Street			20 December 1971	TM2690149104; 52°05′37″N 1°18′40″E		1031025	Upload Photo	Q26282367
24,26, Seckford Street	II	24, 26, Seckford Street			20 December 1971	TM2693549125; 52°05′38″N 1°18′42″E		1377094	Upload Photo	Q26657583
27,29, Seckford Street	II	27, 29, Seckford Street			20 December 1971	TM2688749103; 52°05′37″N 1°18′39″E		1031026	Upload Photo	Q26282368
28-32 Seckford Street	II	28-32, Seckford Street			25 January 1951	TM2692549125; 52°05′38″N 1°18′41″E		1030986	Upload Photo	Q26282321
31, Seckford Street	II	31, Seckford Street			20 December 1971	TM2686849102; 52°05′37″N 1°18′38″E		1300952	Upload Photo	Q26588224
34 and 36 Seckford Street	II	34 and 36, Seckford Street			20 December 1971	TM2690649120; 52°05′38″N 1°18′40″E		1377057	Upload Photo	Q26657546
35, Seckford Street	II	35, Seckford Street			20 December 1971	TM2685149101; 52°05′37″N 1°18′37″E		1377073	Upload Photo	Q26657561
Holly Lodge	II	39, Seckford Street			20 December 1971	TM2668949092; 52°05′37″N 1°18′29″E		1200077	Upload Photo	Q26495912
41-49, Seckford Street	II	41-49, Seckford Street			20 December 1971	TM2667849105; 52°05′38″N 1°18′28″E		1031027	Upload Photo	Q26282370
44-50 Seckford Street	II	44-50, Seckford Street			20 December 1971	TM2688949118; 52°05′38″N 1°18′39″E		1030987	Upload Photo	Q26282322
61-65, Seckford Street	II	61-65, Seckford Street			20 December 1971	TM2663549111; 52°05′38″N 1°18′26″E		1377074	Upload Photo	Q26657562
67,69, Seckford Street	II	67, 69, Seckford Street			20 December 1971	TM2662649111; 52°05′38″N 1°18′25″E		1200099	Upload Photo	Q26495932
Former Queens Head Inn	II	70, Seckford Street	inn		20 December 1971	TM2682249111; 52°05′38″N 1°18′36″E		1030988	Former Queens Head Inn More images	Q26282324
71, Seckford Street	II	71, Seckford Street			20 December 1971	TM2661549110; 52°05′38″N 1°18′25″E		1031028	Upload Photo	Q26282371
72,74, Seckford Street	II	72, 74, Seckford Street			20 December 1971	TM2678149114; 52°05′38″N 1°18′33″E		1377058	Upload Photo	Q26657547
75,77, Seckford Street	II	75, 77, Seckford Street			20 December 1971	TM2660049113; 52°05′38″N 1°18′24″E		1200110	Upload Photo	Q26495942
100, Seckford Street	II	100, Seckford Street			20 December 1971	TM2645649164; 52°05′40″N 1°18′16″E		1031070	Upload Photo	Q26282414
Forecourt Wall, with Iron Balustrade of Seckford Hospital	II	Seckford Street			20 December 1971	TM2656749132; 52°05′39″N 1°18′22″E		1030990	Upload Photo	Q26282326
Lodge of Seckford Hospital	II	Seckford Street			20 December 1971	TM2667149127; 52°05′39″N 1°18′28″E		1030991	Upload Photo	Q26282327
Seckford Hospital	II*	Seckford Street	hospital building		20 December 1971	TM2656949160; 52°05′40″N 1°18′22″E		1377059	Seckford Hospital More images	Q17546562
Almshouses, Seckford Terrace	II	1-8, Seckford Terrace, Seckford Street	almshouse		20 December 1971	TM2673849122; 52°05′38″N 1°18′31″E		1030989	Almshouses, Seckford Terrace More images	Q26282325
Ingram, Smith and Son, Buildings	II	Smith And Son, Buildings, 3, Quay Street			25 January 1951	TM2731048899; 52°05′30″N 1°19′01″E		1199692	Upload Photo	Q26495555
Church of St John	II	St John's Hill	church building		20 December 1971	TM2740249269; 52°05′42″N 1°19′06″E		1031016	Church of St John More images	Q26282355
Alma House	II	9, St Johns Hill			20 December 1971	TM2744049291; 52°05′43″N 1°19′08″E		1031017	Upload Photo	Q26282357
The Vicarage	II	24, St Johns Hill			20 December 1971	TM2745349246; 52°05′41″N 1°19′09″E		1199830	Upload Photo	Q26495687
Garden Walls of No 24 (the Vicarage)	II	St Johns Hill			20 December 1971	TM2744049257; 52°05′42″N 1°19′08″E		1377071	Upload Photo	Q26657559
The Round House	II	1 and 1a, St Johns Street			20 December 1971	TM2739149184; 52°05′39″N 1°19′06″E		1199867	Upload Photo	Q26495722
9,11, St Johns Street	II	9, 11, St Johns Street			20 December 1971	TM2742049200; 52°05′40″N 1°19′07″E		1031018	Upload Photo	Q26282358
15-21 St Johns Street	II	15-21, St Johns Street			20 December 1971	TM2744749216; 52°05′40″N 1°19′09″E		1031020	Upload Photo	Q26282360
Methodist Church (wesleyan)	II	St Johns Street	architectural structure		20 December 1971	TM2751949279; 52°05′42″N 1°19′13″E		1199923	Methodist Church (wesleyan) More images	Q26495770
Roman Catholic Church of St Thomas of Canterbury and Attached Parish Rooms	II	St Johns Street, IP12 1EB			20 December 1971	TM2742949211; 52°05′40″N 1°19′08″E		1199878	Upload Photo	Q26495733
1,2, St Johns Terrace	II	1, 2, St Johns Terrace			20 December 1971	TM2743349292; 52°05′43″N 1°19′08″E		1031021	Upload Photo	Q26282362
16,17, St Johns Terrace	II	16, 17, St Johns Terrace			20 December 1971	TM2737449306; 52°05′43″N 1°19′05″E		1031022	Upload Photo	Q26282363
Quay House	II	1, Station Road			25 January 1951	TM2734948820; 52°05′28″N 1°19′02″E		1200447	Upload Photo	Q26496247
Jubilee Terrace	II	3-7, Station Road			20 December 1971	TM2733648815; 52°05′27″N 1°19′02″E		1377060	Upload Photo	Q26657548
13 and 15, Station Road	II	13 and 15, Station Road			20 December 1971	TM2720348800; 52°05′27″N 1°18′55″E		1200468	Upload Photo	Q26496266
19-23, Station Road	II	19-23, Station Road			20 December 1971	TM2714348790; 52°05′27″N 1°18′52″E		1030992	Upload Photo	Q26282329
44, Station Road	II	44, Station Road			20 December 1971	TM2703348744; 52°05′26″N 1°18′46″E		1300727	Upload Photo	Q26588012
46 and 48, Station Road	II	46 and 48, Station Road			20 December 1971	TM2702448745; 52°05′26″N 1°18′45″E		1030993	Upload Photo	Q26282330
Tanyard House	II	Station Road			20 January 1998	TM2717548798; 52°05′27″N 1°18′53″E		1376804	Upload Photo	Q26657322
15,16, Sun Lane	II	15, 16, Sun Lane			20 December 1971	TM2750549331; 52°05′44″N 1°19′12″E		1377061	Upload Photo	Q26657549
17-21, Sun Lane	II	17-21, Sun Lane			20 December 1971	TM2749549336; 52°05′44″N 1°19′11″E		1200480	Upload Photo	Q26496277
22,23, Sun Lane	II	22, 23, Sun Lane			20 December 1971	TM2748249342; 52°05′44″N 1°19′11″E		1030994	Upload Photo	Q26282331
24,25, Sun Lane	II	24, 25, Sun Lane			20 December 1971	TM2747549345; 52°05′44″N 1°19′10″E		1300734	Upload Photo	Q26588018
26,27, Sun Lane	II	26, 27, Sun Lane			20 December 1971	TM2746949348; 52°05′44″N 1°19′10″E		1030995	Upload Photo	Q26282332
1, Theatre Street	II	1, Theatre Street			20 December 1971	TM2701849173; 52°05′39″N 1°18′46″E		1300708	Upload Photo	Q26587993
Angel Inn	II*	2, Theatre Street	inn		25 January 1951	TM2700549190; 52°05′40″N 1°18′45″E		1030996	Angel Inn More images	Q17546183
The Royal William Inn	II	4, Theatre Street			20 December 1971	TM2693949210; 52°05′41″N 1°18′42″E		1030997	Upload Photo	Q26282333
7,9, Theatre Street	II	7, 9, Theatre Street			20 December 1971	TM2698349181; 52°05′40″N 1°18′44″E		1031000	Upload Photo	Q26282337
Formerly No 10	II	8, Theatre Street			20 December 1971	TM2691949214; 52°05′41″N 1°18′41″E		1030998	Upload Photo	Q26282335
11, Theatre Street	II	11, Theatre Street			25 January 1951	TM2697249183; 52°05′40″N 1°18′44″E		1031001	Upload Photo	Q26282338
12,14, Theatre Street	II	12, 14, Theatre Street			20 December 1971	TM2690949215; 52°05′41″N 1°18′40″E		1300739	Upload Photo	Q26588023
13, Theatre Street	II	13, Theatre Street			20 December 1971	TM2696549185; 52°05′40″N 1°18′43″E		1200579	Upload Photo	Q26496368
16-24, Theatre Street	II	16-24, Theatre Street			20 December 1971	TM2688349219; 52°05′41″N 1°18′39″E		1030999	Upload Photo	Q26282336
51, Theatre Street	II	51, Theatre Street			21 January 1951	TM2685149206; 52°05′41″N 1°18′37″E		1031002	Upload Photo	Q26282340
Former Theatre	II	Theatre Street			20 December 1971	TM2697749211; 52°05′41″N 1°18′44″E		1200491	Upload Photo	Q26496286
Garden Wall of No 51	II	Theatre Street			20 December 1971	TM2683949211; 52°05′41″N 1°18′37″E		1031003	Upload Photo	Q26282341
Trickers Mill	II	Theatre Street	tower mill		13 March 1970	TM2687449162; 52°05′39″N 1°18′38″E		1300668	Trickers Mill More images	Q7841176
1, 1a, 1b and 1c, Thoroughfare	II	1, 1a, 1b and 1c, Thoroughfare			20 December 1971	TM2728548998; 52°05′33″N 1°19′00″E		1377062	Upload Photo	Q26657550
3, Thoroughfare	II	3, Thoroughfare			20 December 1971	TM2728349017; 52°05′34″N 1°19′00″E		1300676	Upload Photo	Q26587963
5,7, Thoroughfare	II	5, 7, Thoroughfare			20 December 1971	TM2730349014; 52°05′34″N 1°19′01″E		1031004	Upload Photo	Q26282342
Lloyds Bank	II	8, Thoroughfare			20 December 1971	TM2731649002; 52°05′34″N 1°19′01″E		1300549	Upload Photo	Q26587846
9,9a, Thoroughfare	II	9, 9a, Thoroughfare			20 December 1971	TM2731549022; 52°05′34″N 1°19′01″E		1377063	Upload Photo	Q26657551
Alexandra and Dewhurst	II	10 and 12, Thoroughfare			25 January 1951	TM2732749009; 52°05′34″N 1°19′02″E		1030973	Upload Photo	Q26282306
Woolworths	II	11, Thoroughfare			20 December 1971	TM2733049034; 52°05′35″N 1°19′02″E		1200623	Upload Photo	Q26496405
13,15, Thoroughfare	II	13, 15, Thoroughfare			20 December 1971	TM2735249039; 52°05′35″N 1°19′03″E		1031005	Upload Photo	Q26282343
14 Thoroughfare	II	14, Thoroughfare			20 December 1971	TM2733749012; 52°05′34″N 1°19′02″E		1030974	Upload Photo	Q26282307
16 Thoroughfare	II	16, Thoroughfare			20 December 1971	TM2734649017; 52°05′34″N 1°19′03″E		1183491	Upload Photo	Q26478735
17, Thoroughfare	II	17, Thoroughfare			20 December 1971	TM2736549048; 52°05′35″N 1°19′04″E		1031006	Upload Photo	Q26282344
18 and 20 Thoroughfare	II	18 and 20, Thoroughfare			25 January 1951	TM2735749023; 52°05′34″N 1°19′03″E		1030975	Upload Photo	Q26282308
19, Thoroughfare	II	19, Thoroughfare			20 December 1971	TM2738049048; 52°05′35″N 1°19′05″E		1377082	Upload Photo	Q26657570
22 Thoroughfare	II	22, Thoroughfare			25 January 1951	TM2736849030; 52°05′34″N 1°19′04″E		1030976	Upload Photo	Q26282310
24 Thoroughfare	II	24, Thoroughfare			20 December 1971	TM2738749035; 52°05′34″N 1°19′05″E		1030977	Upload Photo	Q26282311
Hales, Pulham and Cook	II	26-30, Thoroughfare			20 December 1971	TM2739749042; 52°05′35″N 1°19′06″E		1183548	Upload Photo	Q26478790
27, Thoroughfare	II	27, Thoroughfare			20 December 1971	TM2741049064; 52°05′35″N 1°19′06″E		1030963	Upload Photo	Q26282294
29,29a, Thoroughfare	II	29, 29a, Thoroughfare			20 December 1971	TM2742049069; 52°05′36″N 1°19′07″E		1377083	Upload Photo	Q26657571
31, Thoroughfare	II	31, Thoroughfare			25 January 1951	TM2743649079; 52°05′36″N 1°19′08″E		1030964	Upload Photo	Q26282296
34, Thoroughfare, Woodbridge	II	34, Thoroughfare, IP12 1AQ			20 December 1971	TM2741549044; 52°05′35″N 1°19′06″E		1030978	Upload Photo	Q26282312
Barretts	II	40, Thoroughfare			20 December 1971	TM2744549064; 52°05′35″N 1°19′08″E		1030979	Upload Photo	Q26282314
Norvic	II	42, Thoroughfare			20 December 1971	TM2745649070; 52°05′36″N 1°19′09″E		1183577	Upload Photo	Q26478812
Hubbard	II	43, Thoroughfare			25 January 1951	TM2747249108; 52°05′37″N 1°19′10″E		1377084	Upload Photo	Q26657572
Savings Bank	II	44, Thoroughfare			20 December 1971	TM2746349076; 52°05′36″N 1°19′09″E		1030980	Upload Photo	Q26282315
45,45b, Thoroughfare	II	45, 45b, Thoroughfare			20 December 1971	TM2747949114; 52°05′37″N 1°19′10″E		1030965	Upload Photo	Q26282297
47, Thoroughfare	II	47, Thoroughfare			27 October 1970	TM2748949122; 52°05′37″N 1°19′11″E		1377085	Upload Photo	Q26657573
49,51, Thoroughfare	II	49, 51, Thoroughfare			25 January 1951	TM2749849135; 52°05′38″N 1°19′11″E		1030966	Upload Photo	Q26282298
Jacobs	II	52, Thoroughfare			20 December 1971	TM2747149086; 52°05′36″N 1°19′10″E		1030981	Upload Photo	Q26282316
53, Thoroughfare	II	53, Thoroughfare			20 December 1971	TM2750849143; 52°05′38″N 1°19′12″E		1377086	Upload Photo	Q26657574
54, Thoroughfare	II	54, Thoroughfare			20 December 1971	TM2747549088; 52°05′36″N 1°19′10″E		1183598	Upload Photo	Q26478834
Saddler	II	55, Thoroughfare			20 December 1971	TM2751149148; 52°05′38″N 1°19′12″E		1030967	Upload Photo	Q26282299
56, Thoroughfare	II	56, Thoroughfare			20 December 1971	TM2747849091; 52°05′36″N 1°19′10″E		1377091	Upload Photo	Q26657580
58, Thoroughfare	II	58, Thoroughfare			25 January 1951	TM2748849096; 52°05′36″N 1°19′10″E		1183635	Upload Photo	Q26478877
60,62, Thoroughfare	II	60, 62, Thoroughfare			20 December 1971	TM2750349111; 52°05′37″N 1°19′11″E		1377092	Upload Photo	Q26657581
64, Thoroughfare	II	64, Thoroughfare			20 December 1971	TM2751049117; 52°05′37″N 1°19′12″E		1183646	Upload Photo	Q26478892
66, Thoroughfare	II	66, Thoroughfare			25 January 1951	TM2751249127; 52°05′37″N 1°19′12″E		1030952	Upload Photo	Q26282282
63-67, Thoroughfare	II	67, Thoroughfare			20 December 1971	TM2753549175; 52°05′39″N 1°19′13″E		1030968	Upload Photo	Q26282301
68,70, Thoroughfare	II	68, 70, Thoroughfare			20 December 1971	TM2752049136; 52°05′38″N 1°19′12″E		1377078	Upload Photo	Q26657566
69, Thoroughfare	II	69, Thoroughfare			20 December 1971	TM2753949184; 52°05′39″N 1°19′13″E		1377087	Upload Photo	Q26657575
72, Thoroughfare	II	72, Thoroughfare			25 January 1951	TM2752949147; 52°05′38″N 1°19′13″E		1030953	Upload Photo	Q26282283
Norfolk House	II*	73, Thoroughfare			20 December 1971	TM2754649192; 52°05′39″N 1°19′14″E		1200699	Upload Photo	Q17546406
74, Thoroughfare	II*	74, Thoroughfare			25 January 1951	TM2753649156; 52°05′38″N 1°19′13″E		1030954	Upload Photo	Q17546164
Herne House	II	75, Thoroughfare			20 December 1971	TM2755349199; 52°05′40″N 1°19′14″E		1030969	Upload Photo	Q26282302
Park House and Elmhurst	II	76, Thoroughfare			20 December 1971	TM2755049169; 52°05′39″N 1°19′14″E		1377079	Upload Photo	Q26657567
77, Thoroughfare	II	77, Thoroughfare			20 December 1971	TM2755549204; 52°05′40″N 1°19′14″E		1200750	Upload Photo	Q26496525
Selwyn House	II*	78, Thoroughfare			25 January 1951	TM2755649179; 52°05′39″N 1°19′14″E		1030955	Upload Photo	Q17546170
79, Thoroughfare	II	79, Thoroughfare			20 December 1971	TM2756049209; 52°05′40″N 1°19′14″E		1377088	Upload Photo	Q26657576
80,82,82a, Thoroughfare	II	80, 82, 82a, Thoroughfare			20 December 1971	TM2756349189; 52°05′39″N 1°19′15″E		1377080	Upload Photo	Q26657568
81,83, Thoroughfare	II*	81, 83, Thoroughfare			25 January 1951	TM2756649220; 52°05′40″N 1°19′15″E		1030970	Upload Photo	Q17546177
84, Thoroughfare	II	84, Thoroughfare			25 January 1951	TM2756949196; 52°05′39″N 1°19′15″E		1030956	Upload Photo	Q26282284
St Johns Lodge	II	85, Thoroughfare	gatehouse		25 January 1951	TM2757849246; 52°05′41″N 1°19′16″E		1200778	St Johns Lodge More images	Q26496549
87, Thoroughfare	II	87, Thoroughfare			13 March 1970	TM2758849250; 52°05′41″N 1°19′16″E		1030971	Upload Photo	Q26282303
89,91, Thoroughfare	II	89, 91, Thoroughfare			13 March 1970	TM2759249257; 52°05′41″N 1°19′16″E		1377089	Upload Photo	Q26657577
The Lion Inn	II	90, Thoroughfare	inn		25 January 1951	TM2758349215; 52°05′40″N 1°19′16″E		1030957	The Lion Inn More images	Q26282285
93, Thoroughfare	II	93, Thoroughfare			13 March 1970	TM2759349264; 52°05′42″N 1°19′16″E		1300604	Upload Photo	Q26587897
95, Thoroughfare	II	95, Thoroughfare			13 March 1970	TM2759749287; 52°05′42″N 1°19′17″E		1030972	Upload Photo	Q26282304
97, Thoroughfare	II*	97, Thoroughfare			25 January 1951	TM2759449297; 52°05′43″N 1°19′16″E		1183453	Upload Photo	Q17546290
100 Thoroughfare	II	100, Thoroughfare			25 January 1951	TM2761849279; 52°05′42″N 1°19′18″E		1030958	Upload Photo	Q26282287
Sun Hotel	II	102, Thoroughfare			25 January 1951	TM2761949292; 52°05′42″N 1°19′18″E		1030959	Upload Photo	Q26282289
104-110, Thoroughfare	II	104-110, Thoroughfare			20 December 1971	TM2763249338; 52°05′44″N 1°19′19″E		1030960	Upload Photo	Q26282290
22a Thoroughfare	II	22a, Thoroughfare			20 December 1971	TM2737649032; 52°05′34″N 1°19′04″E		1300535	Upload Photo	Q26587833
58a, Thoroughfare	II	58a, Thoroughfare			20 December 1971	TM2748249094; 52°05′36″N 1°19′10″E		1030982	Upload Photo	Q26282317
The Crown Hotel	II	Thoroughfare	hotel		25 January 1951	TM2728048979; 52°05′33″N 1°18′59″E		1377090	The Crown Hotel More images	Q26657578
Granary at Tide Mill	II	Tide Mill Quay			20 December 1971	TM2759448760; 52°05′25″N 1°19′15″E		1377081	Upload Photo	Q26657569
Tide Mill	I	Tide Mill Quay	museum		25 January 1951	TM2759548735; 52°05′24″N 1°19′15″E		1300451	Tide Mill More images	Q8032425
Turn Lane Cottage	II	1 and 2, Turn Lane			20 December 1971	TM2716448982; 52°05′33″N 1°18′53″E		1030961	Upload Photo	Q26282292
3,4, Turn Lane	II	3, 4, Turn Lane			20 December 1971	TM2715148941; 52°05′32″N 1°18′52″E		1030962	Upload Photo	Q26282293
Friends Meeting House	II	Turn Lane			25 January 1951	TM2713548970; 52°05′33″N 1°18′52″E		1183686	Upload Photo	Q26478933
Pump in Centre of Hill, West of the Shire Hall	II	West Of The Shire Hall, Market Hill	building		20 December 1971	TM2706149150; 52°05′39″N 1°18′48″E		1031031	Pump in Centre of Hill, West of the Shire Hall More images	Q26282374

== See also ==
- Grade I listed buildings in Suffolk
- Grade II* listed buildings in Suffolk

== Sources ==
- Bettely, James; Pevsner, Nikolaus (2015) [1961], Suffolk: East, The Buildings of England, New Haven and London: Yale University Press, ISBN 978-0-300-19654-2
