= Listed buildings in Southwold =

Civil Parish in Suffolk, England

Southwold is a town and civil parish in the East Suffolk District of Suffolk, England. It contains 144 listed buildings that are recorded in the National Heritage List for England. Of these one is grade I, four are grade II* and 139 are grade II.

This list is based on the information retrieved online from Historic England.

== Key ==
Grade	Criteria
I	Buildings that are of exceptional interest
II*	Particularly important buildings of more than special interest
II	Buildings that are of special interest

== Listing ==
Name	Grade	Location	Type	Completed (Note: The date given is the date used by Historic England as significant for the initial building or that of an important part in the structure's description.)	Date designated	Grid ref. (Note: The grid reference is based on the British national grid reference system, sometimes known as OSGB36, used by the Ordnance Survey.) Geo-coordinates	Notes	Entry number (Note: The "List Entry Number" is a unique number assigned to each listed building and scheduled monument by Historic England.)	Image	Wikidata
8 East Cliff	II	8 East Cliff, IP18 6JJ			22 November 1971	TM5096276143; 52°19′33″N 1°40′54″E		1384338	Upload Photo	Q26664183
Southwold War Memorial	II	IP18 6JA	war memorial		9 January 2018	TM5074076347; 52°19′40″N 1°40′42″E		1450072	Southwold War Memorial More images	Q66479025
15 and 16, Barnaby Green	II	15 and 16, Barnaby Green			22 November 1971	TM5052776386; 52°19′42″N 1°40′31″E		1384311	Upload Photo	Q26664157
17, Barnaby Green	II	17, Barnaby Green			22 November 1971	TM5052676377; 52°19′42″N 1°40′31″E		1384312	Upload Photo	Q26664158
1 and 2, Bartholomew Green	II	1 and 2, Bartholomew Green			22 November 1971	TM5069376318; 52°19′39″N 1°40′40″E		1384313	Upload Photo	Q26664159
3 and 4, Bartholomew Green	II	3 and 4, Bartholomew Green			22 November 1971	TM5069376330; 52°19′40″N 1°40′40″E		1384314	Upload Photo	Q26664160
5 and 6, Bartholomew Green	II	5 and 6, Bartholomew Green			22 November 1971	TM5069276346; 52°19′40″N 1°40′40″E		1384315	Upload Photo	Q26664161
Iona	II	7, Bartholomew Green			22 November 1971	TM5069776360; 52°19′41″N 1°40′40″E		1384316	Upload Photo	Q26664162
Vanessa Villa	II	8, Bartholomew Green			22 November 1971	TM5069476367; 52°19′41″N 1°40′40″E		1384317	Upload Photo	Q26664163
Oak Cottage	II	17, Bartholomew Green			22 November 1971	TM5075876311; 52°19′39″N 1°40′43″E		1384318	Upload Photo	Q26664164
Churchyard Gates Approximately 15 Metres South of Church of St Edmund's	II	Bartholomew Green			30 March 2000	TM5074976356; 52°19′41″N 1°40′43″E		1384319	Upload Photo	Q26664165
Harbour Inn	II	Blackshore Quay	inn		22 November 1971	TM4964975562; 52°19′17″N 1°39′43″E		1384320	Harbour Inn More images	Q26664166
2 Headstones Approximately 12 Metres South East of Church of St Edmund	II	2 Headstones Approximately 12 Metres South East Of Church Of St Edmund, Church Green			30 March 2000	TM5078576365; 52°19′41″N 1°40′45″E		1384324	Upload Photo	Q26664169
2 Headstones Approximately 15 Metres East South East of Church of St Edmund	II	2 Headstones Approximately 15 Metres East South East Of Church Of St Edmund, Church Green			30 March 2000	TM5080076384; 52°19′41″N 1°40′46″E		1384325	Upload Photo	Q26664170
Bardwell Monument Approximately 15 Metres South of the Chancel of Church of St Edmund	II	Church Green			30 March 2000	TM5077276366; 52°19′41″N 1°40′44″E		1384327	Upload Photo	Q26664172
Chest Tomb Approximately 5 Metres South East of Church of St Edmund	II	Church Green			30 March 2000	TM5078376375; 52°19′41″N 1°40′45″E		1384322	Upload Photo	Q26664167
Church of St Edmund	I	Church Green	church building		21 April 1949	TM5075076388; 52°19′42″N 1°40′43″E		1384321	Church of St Edmund More images	Q15979341
Headstone Approximately 10 Metres South of Porch of Church of St Edmund	II	Church Green			30 March 2000	TM5073876365; 52°19′41″N 1°40′42″E		1384328	Upload Photo	Q26664173
Headstone to A Nolloth Approximately 15 Matres South of Chancel of Church of St Edmund	II	Church Green			30 March 2000	TM5078776362; 52°19′41″N 1°40′45″E		1384323	Upload Photo	Q26664168
Pair of Headstones Approximately 5 Metres South of Porch of Church of St Edmund	II	Church Green			30 March 2000	TM5074876367; 52°19′41″N 1°40′43″E		1384326	Upload Photo	Q26664171
1-19, Church Street	II	1-19, Church Street			30 March 2000	TM5080076249; 52°19′37″N 1°40′45″E		1384329	Upload Photo	Q26664174
24 and 26, Church Street	II	24 and 26, Church Street			21 April 1949	TM5081576235; 52°19′37″N 1°40′46″E		1384330	Upload Photo	Q26664175
Headstone Approximately 7 Metres South of Porch of Church of St Edmund	II	Church Street			30 March 2000	TM5073876364; 52°19′41″N 1°40′42″E		1384331	Upload Photo	Q26664176
Iona Cottage and Iona Flat	II	11 and 11a, Constitution Hill			22 November 1971	TM5073375876; 52°19′25″N 1°40′41″E		1384332	Upload Photo	Q26664177
Lydstep House and Coign	II	Constitution Hill			22 November 1971	TM5075175897; 52°19′26″N 1°40′42″E		1384333	Upload Photo	Q26664178
Rowan Cottage	II	Constitution Hill			22 November 1971	TM5074175888; 52°19′26″N 1°40′41″E		1384334	Upload Photo	Q26664179
Cliff House and Shrimp Cottage	II	2 and 3, East Cliff			22 November 1971	TM5095776104; 52°19′32″N 1°40′53″E		1384335	Upload Photo	Q26664180
5 and 6, East Cliff	II	5 and 6, East Cliff			30 March 2000	TM5096876128; 52°19′33″N 1°40′54″E		1384336	Upload Photo	Q26664181
7, East Cliff	II	7, East Cliff			22 November 1971	TM5096576140; 52°19′33″N 1°40′54″E		1384337	Upload Photo	Q26664182
Bay View (number 14) and East Cliff (number 15) and Railings Attached to Front	II	14 and 15, East Cliff			22 November 1971	TM5096976174; 52°19′34″N 1°40′54″E		1384340	Upload Photo	Q26664185
Sailors' Reading Room	II	East Cliff	museum		22 November 1971	TM5095276094; 52°19′32″N 1°40′53″E		1384341	Sailors' Reading Room More images	Q26664186
3-6, East Green	II	3-6, East Green			22 November 1971	TM5089876257; 52°19′37″N 1°40′51″E		1384342	Upload Photo	Q26664187
Sole Bay Inn	II	7, East Green	pub		22 November 1971	TM5091676277; 52°19′38″N 1°40′52″E		1384343	Sole Bay Inn More images	Q26664188
8 and 9, East Green	II	8 and 9, East Green			22 November 1971	TM5090976279; 52°19′38″N 1°40′51″E		1384344	Upload Photo	Q26664189
10, East Green	II	10, East Green			22 November 1971	TM5090476284; 52°19′38″N 1°40′51″E		1384345	Upload Photo	Q26664190
25, Market Place (see Details for Further Address Information)	II	1 and 3, East Street			22 November 1971	TM5084176128; 52°19′33″N 1°40′47″E		1384390	Upload Photo	Q26664231
2, East Street	II	2, East Street			22 November 1971	TM5084576147; 52°19′34″N 1°40′47″E		1384346	Upload Photo	Q26664191
Gordon House	II	7, East Street			22 November 1971	TM5085776119; 52°19′33″N 1°40′48″E		1384347	Upload Photo	Q26664192
Trafalgar Cottage	II	13 and 15, East Street			22 November 1971	TM5089676099; 52°19′32″N 1°40′50″E		1384348	Upload Photo	Q26664193
Spindrift	II	30 and 32, East Street			22 November 1971	TM5089876120; 52°19′33″N 1°40′50″E		1384349	Upload Photo	Q26664194
Reading Room Cottage	II	East Street			30 March 2000	TM5093776101; 52°19′32″N 1°40′52″E		1384350	Upload Photo	Q26664195
Salt Works Cottage	II	4, Ferry Road			22 November 1971	TM5069275773; 52°19′22″N 1°40′38″E		1384351	Upload Photo	Q26664196
Park Lane Cottage Park Lane Cottage West	II	Gardner Road			22 November 1971	TM5067976012; 52°19′30″N 1°40′38″E		1384352	Upload Photo	Q26664197
Park Lane Cottage Park Lane Cottage West	II	Gardner Road			22 November 1971	TM5067776006; 52°19′29″N 1°40′38″E		1384407	Upload Photo	Q26688071
Gun Hill Place	II	Gun Hill			22 November 1971	TM5081275846; 52°19′24″N 1°40′45″E		1384353	Upload Photo	Q26664198
Stone House	II	Gun Hill			21 April 1949	TM5075375704; 52°19′20″N 1°40′41″E		1384354	Upload Photo	Q26664199
Watch House	II	Gun Hill			22 November 1971	TM5079675736; 52°19′21″N 1°40′44″E		1384355	Upload Photo	Q26664200
Ferndale Cottage	II	7 and 7a, High Street			22 November 1971	TM5052976459; 52°19′44″N 1°40′32″E		1384356	Upload Photo	Q26664201
13 and 15, High Street	II	13 and 15, High Street, IP18 6AS			22 November 1971	TM5053476443; 52°19′44″N 1°40′32″E		1384357	Upload Photo	Q26664202
Barnaby Cottage	II	16, High Street			22 November 1971	TM5057776398; 52°19′42″N 1°40′34″E		1384358	Upload Photo	Q26664203
White Horse Cottage	II	19, High Street			22 November 1971	TM5053676431; 52°19′43″N 1°40′32″E		1384359	Upload Photo	Q26664204
20, High Street	II	20, High Street			22 November 1971	TM5058576403; 52°19′42″N 1°40′34″E		1384360	Upload Photo	Q26664205
22, High Street	II	22, High Street			30 March 2000	TM5058976398; 52°19′42″N 1°40′35″E		1384361	Upload Photo	Q26664206
King's Head Hotel	II	23, High Street	hotel		22 November 1971	TM5056576376; 52°19′42″N 1°40′33″E		1384362	King's Head Hotel More images	Q26664207
25, High Street	II	25, High Street			22 November 1971	TM5057476366; 52°19′41″N 1°40′34″E		1384363	Upload Photo	Q26664208
Montague House and Railings Attached at Front	II	34 and 36, High Street			22 November 1971	TM5061276344; 52°19′40″N 1°40′36″E		1384364	Upload Photo	Q26664209
38 and 40, High Street	II	38 and 40, High Street			22 November 1971	TM5061676334; 52°19′40″N 1°40′36″E		1384365	Upload Photo	Q26664210
The Old House (number 49)	II	49, 51 and 51a, High Street			22 November 1971	TM5065176268; 52°19′38″N 1°40′38″E		1384366	Upload Photo	Q26664211
54 and 54a, High Street	II	54 and 54a, High Street			22 November 1971	TM5065676295; 52°19′39″N 1°40′38″E		1384367	Upload Photo	Q26664212
55-63, High Street	II	55-63, High Street			22 November 1971	TM5067876244; 52°19′37″N 1°40′39″E		1384368	Upload Photo	Q26664213
Sutherland House	II*	56, High Street			21 April 1949	TM5066776289; 52°19′39″N 1°40′38″E		1384369	Upload Photo	Q17547026
Manor House and Manor Gate Including Forecourt Walls	II*	65 and 67, High Street	architectural structure		21 April 1949	TM5069976219; 52°19′36″N 1°40′40″E		1384370	Manor House and Manor Gate Including Forecourt Walls More images	Q17547034
66, High Street	II	66, High Street			22 November 1971	TM5069576256; 52°19′37″N 1°40′40″E		1384371	Upload Photo	Q26664214
Olde Banke House	II	69, High Street			22 November 1971	TM5073176185; 52°19′35″N 1°40′42″E		1384372	Upload Photo	Q26664215
71, High Street	II	71, High Street			22 November 1971	TM5073776183; 52°19′35″N 1°40′42″E		1384373	Upload Photo	Q26664216
Rutland House	II	80 and 80a, High Street			22 November 1971	TM5073076230; 52°19′37″N 1°40′42″E		1384374	Upload Photo	Q26664217
Buckenham House	II*	81 and 83, High Street			21 April 1949	TM5076376161; 52°19′34″N 1°40′43″E		1384375	Upload Photo	Q17547041
82, 84 and 86, High Street	II	82, 84 and 86, High Street			22 November 1971	TM5073876221; 52°19′36″N 1°40′42″E		1384376	Upload Photo	Q26664218
Crown Hotel	II	90 and 92, High Street	hotel		21 April 1949	TM5076076204; 52°19′36″N 1°40′43″E		1384377	Crown Hotel More images	Q26664219
94, High Street	II	94, High Street			22 November 1971	TM5077076190; 52°19′35″N 1°40′44″E		1384378	Upload Photo	Q26664220
96, High Street	II	96, High Street			22 November 1971	TM5077576185; 52°19′35″N 1°40′44″E		1384379	Upload Photo	Q26664221
98, 98a and 100, High Street	II	98, 98a and 100, High Street			22 November 1971	TM5078376182; 52°19′35″N 1°40′44″E		1384380	Upload Photo	Q26664222
United Reformed Church	II	High Street	church building		22 November 1971	TM5071176201; 52°19′36″N 1°40′41″E		1384381	United Reformed Church More images	Q26664223
3, Market Place	II	3, Market Place			22 November 1971	TM5078576153; 52°19′34″N 1°40′44″E		1384382	Upload Photo	Q26664224
10, Market Place	II	10, Market Place			22 November 1971	TM5084276150; 52°19′34″N 1°40′47″E		1384383	Upload Photo	Q26664225
11 and 13, Market Place	II	11 and 13, Market Place			22 November 1971	TM5079676139; 52°19′34″N 1°40′45″E		1384384	Upload Photo	Q26664226
15, Market Place	II	15, Market Place			22 November 1971	TM5080076132; 52°19′33″N 1°40′45″E		1384385	Upload Photo	Q26664227
Lloyds Bank	II*	17, Market Place	house		21 April 1949	TM5080176122; 52°19′33″N 1°40′45″E		1384386	Lloyds Bank More images	Q17547051
19, Market Place	II	19, Market Place			22 November 1971	TM5080476113; 52°19′33″N 1°40′45″E		1384387	Upload Photo	Q26664228
21, Market Place	II	21, Market Place			22 November 1971	TM5082576119; 52°19′33″N 1°40′46″E		1384388	Upload Photo	Q26664229
23, Market Place	II	23, Market Place			22 November 1971	TM5083176128; 52°19′33″N 1°40′47″E		1384389	Upload Photo	Q26664230
Swan Hotel	II	Market Place	hotel		22 November 1971	TM5083876167; 52°19′34″N 1°40′47″E		1384391	Swan Hotel More images	Q26664232
Town Hall	II	Market Place	city hall		21 April 1949	TM5080876166; 52°19′34″N 1°40′46″E		1384392	Town Hall More images	Q26664233
Town Pump	II	Market Place	architectural structure		22 November 1971	TM5081376141; 52°19′34″N 1°40′46″E		1384393	Town Pump More images	Q26664234
Rosemary Cottages	II	1 and 3, Mill Lane			22 November 1971	TM5075476102; 52°19′32″N 1°40′43″E		1384394	Upload Photo	Q26664235
The Old Chapel	II	5, Mill Lane			22 November 1971	TM5074676100; 52°19′32″N 1°40′42″E		1384395	Upload Photo	Q26664236
Primrose Cottage and Dolphin Cottage	II	7, 8 and 9, North Green			22 November 1971	TM5058476485; 52°19′45″N 1°40′35″E		1384396	Upload Photo	Q26664237
The Studio	II	1, Park Lane			30 March 2000	TM5077676010; 52°19′29″N 1°40′43″E		1380274	Upload Photo	Q26660484
Bradwell House (number 6)	II	6 and 8, Park Lane			22 November 1971	TM5078475990; 52°19′29″N 1°40′44″E		1384397	Upload Photo	Q26664238
9, Park Lane	II	9, Park Lane			22 November 1971	TM5075476007; 52°19′29″N 1°40′42″E		1384398	Upload Photo	Q26664239
10 and 12, Park Lane	II	10 and 12, Park Lane			22 November 1971	TM5077075990; 52°19′29″N 1°40′43″E		1384399	Upload Photo	Q26664240
13 and 15, Park Lane	II	13 and 15, Park Lane			22 November 1971	TM5074476008; 52°19′29″N 1°40′42″E		1384400	Upload Photo	Q26664241
14, Park Lane	II	14, Park Lane			22 November 1971	TM5076375990; 52°19′29″N 1°40′43″E		1384401	Upload Photo	Q26664242
16 and 18, Park Lane	II	16 and 18, Park Lane			21 April 1949	TM5075375990; 52°19′29″N 1°40′42″E		1384402	Upload Photo	Q26664243
Honeysuckle Cottage (number 17)	II	17 and 19, Park Lane			22 November 1971	TM5073676008; 52°19′29″N 1°40′41″E		1384403	Upload Photo	Q26664244
20, Park Lane	II	20, Park Lane			22 November 1971	TM5074375990; 52°19′29″N 1°40′42″E		1384404	Upload Photo	Q26664245
21 and 23, Park Lane	II	21 and 23, Park Lane			21 April 1949	TM5072276009; 52°19′29″N 1°40′41″E		1384405	Upload Photo	Q26664246
Strickland House	II	25, Park Lane			22 November 1971	TM5069776024; 52°19′30″N 1°40′39″E		1384406	Upload Photo	Q26664247
6, Pinkney's Lane	II	6, Pinkney's Lane			22 November 1971	TM5084376055; 52°19′31″N 1°40′47″E		1384408	Upload Photo	Q26664249
The Elms (number 1)	II	1 and 3, Queen Street			21 April 1949	TM5081076094; 52°19′32″N 1°40′45″E		1384409	Upload Photo	Q26664250
4 and 6, Queen Street	II	4 and 6, Queen Street			22 November 1971	TM5083276100; 52°19′32″N 1°40′47″E		1384410	Upload Photo	Q26664251
Evington	II	5, Queen Street			22 November 1971	TM5081376082; 52°19′32″N 1°40′46″E		1384411	Upload Photo	Q26664252
May Place May Place Cottage (number 7a)	II	7 and 7a, Queen Street			22 November 1971	TM5081676066; 52°19′31″N 1°40′46″E		1384443	Upload Photo	Q26664285
Holmwood	II	8, Queen Street			22 November 1971	TM5083276094; 52°19′32″N 1°40′47″E		1384412	Upload Photo	Q26664253
10, Queen Street	II	10, Queen Street			22 November 1971	TM5083276088; 52°19′32″N 1°40′47″E		1384413	Upload Photo	Q26664254
12, Queen Street	II	12, Queen Street			22 November 1971	TM5083576083; 52°19′32″N 1°40′47″E		1384414	Upload Photo	Q26664255
14, Queen Street	II	14, Queen Street			22 November 1971	TM5083276078; 52°19′32″N 1°40′47″E		1384415	Upload Photo	Q26664256
16, Queen Street	II	16, Queen Street			22 November 1971	TM5083476073; 52°19′31″N 1°40′47″E		1384416	Upload Photo	Q26664257
18, Queen Street	II	18, Queen Street			22 November 1971	TM5083476065; 52°19′31″N 1°40′47″E		1384417	Upload Photo	Q26664258
Coachman's Cottage	II	2, Queen's Road			22 November 1971	TM5072775824; 52°19′23″N 1°40′40″E		1384418	Upload Photo	Q26664259
6, Queen's Road	II	6, Queen's Road			22 November 1971	TM5071875822; 52°19′23″N 1°40′40″E		1384419	Upload Photo	Q26664260
8, Queen's Road	II	8, Queen's Road			22 November 1971	TM5071675817; 52°19′23″N 1°40′40″E		1384420	Upload Photo	Q26664261
The Bolt Hole and Wayside Cottage	II	10 and 12, Queen's Road			22 November 1971	TM5070675813; 52°19′23″N 1°40′39″E		1384421	Upload Photo	Q26664263
Centre Cliff	II	1 and 2, South Green			21 April 1949	TM5090776033; 52°19′30″N 1°40′50″E		1384441	Upload Photo	Q26664283
Greyfriars North and Greyfriars South and Regency House	II	1, South Green			22 November 1971	TM5080976012; 52°19′29″N 1°40′45″E		1384423	Upload Photo	Q26664265
Red Lion Inn	II	2, South Green	inn		22 November 1971	TM5084476040; 52°19′30″N 1°40′47″E		1384424	Red Lion Inn More images	Q26664266
Centre Cliff	II	3, South Green			21 April 1949	TM5091676048; 52°19′30″N 1°40′51″E		1384442	Upload Photo	Q26688073
Sole Bay Cottage	II	4, South Green			22 November 1971	TM5084676032; 52°19′30″N 1°40′47″E		1384425	Upload Photo	Q26664267
South Green Cottage	II	6, South Green			22 November 1971	TM5085176025; 52°19′30″N 1°40′47″E		1384426	Upload Photo	Q26664268
7, South Green	II	7, South Green			22 November 1971	TM5081075992; 52°19′29″N 1°40′45″E		1384427	Upload Photo	Q26664269
South Green House	II	8, South Green			22 November 1971	TM5085776022; 52°19′30″N 1°40′48″E		1384428	Upload Photo	Q26664270
Dartmouth Cottage	II	11, South Green			22 November 1971	TM5079575965; 52°19′28″N 1°40′44″E		1384430	Upload Photo	Q26664272
South House	II	12, South Green			21 April 1949	TM5089776019; 52°19′29″N 1°40′50″E		1384431	Upload Photo	Q26664273
Wellesley Cottage	II	13, South Green			22 November 1971	TM5078875967; 52°19′28″N 1°40′44″E		1384432	Upload Photo	Q26664274
14 and 14a, South Green	II	14 and 14a, South Green			22 November 1971	TM5088775964; 52°19′28″N 1°40′49″E		1384433	Upload Photo	Q26664275
Providence Cottage	II	15, South Green			22 November 1971	TM5077875966; 52°19′28″N 1°40′43″E		1384434	Upload Photo	Q26664276
The Retreat and Pin Cottage	II	20 and 22, South Green			22 November 1971	TM5086375940; 52°19′27″N 1°40′48″E		1384435	Upload Photo	Q26664277
24, South Green	II	24, South Green			22 November 1971	TM5085875924; 52°19′26″N 1°40′48″E		1384436	Upload Photo	Q26664278
Tudor Cottage	II	25, South Green			22 November 1971	TM5078075932; 52°19′27″N 1°40′43″E		1384437	Upload Photo	Q26664279
Hill House and Woldside	II	27, South Green			21 April 1949	TM5076875918; 52°19′26″N 1°40′43″E		1384438	Upload Photo	Q26664280
10a, 10b, 10c and 10d, South Green	II	10a, 10b, 10c and 10d, South Green			22 November 1971	TM5087376012; 52°19′29″N 1°40′49″E		1384429	Upload Photo	Q26664271
Adnams Wine Merchants	II	South Green			22 November 1971	TM5083676049; 52°19′31″N 1°40′47″E		1384439	Upload Photo	Q26664281
Cannon Lodge	II	South Green, Waveney			21 April 1949	TM5076075909; 52°19′26″N 1°40′42″E		1384440	Upload Photo	Q26664282
Old Water Tower	II	Southwold Common			16 May 1991	TM5020276256; 52°19′38″N 1°40′14″E		1384310	Upload Photo	Q26664156
Whitehall and Guardship	II	28, St James' Green			22 November 1971	TM5099776260; 52°19′37″N 1°40′56″E		1384422	Upload Photo	Q26664264
The Lighthouse	II	Stradbroke Road	lighthouse		22 November 1971	TM5094276284; 52°19′38″N 1°40′53″E		1384444	The Lighthouse More images	Q7571483
8, Trinity Street	II	8, Trinity Street			22 November 1971	TM5092276144; 52°19′33″N 1°40′52″E		1384445	Upload Photo	Q26664287
10, Trinity Street	II	10, Trinity Street			22 November 1971	TM5092676150; 52°19′34″N 1°40′52″E		1384446	Upload Photo	Q26664289
Back to Front Cottage East Cliff House	II	17, Trinity Street			22 November 1971	TM5095876148; 52°19′34″N 1°40′53″E		1384339	Upload Photo	Q26664184
Lantern Cottage (number 52)	II	42-54, Victoria Street			22 November 1971	TM5091276204; 52°19′35″N 1°40′51″E		1384448	Upload Photo	Q26664291
75 and 77, Victoria Street	II	75 and 77, Victoria Street			22 November 1971	TM5090176188; 52°19′35″N 1°40′51″E		1384449	Upload Photo	Q26664292
Trinity Cottage	II	91, Victoria Street			22 November 1971	TM5092976159; 52°19′34″N 1°40′52″E		1384447	Upload Photo	Q26664290
Southwold Museum	II	Victoria Street	museum		22 November 1971	TM5070276300; 52°19′39″N 1°40′40″E		1384450	Southwold Museum More images	Q26664293
Church of the Sacred Heart, and Attached Presbytery	II	Wymering Road, The Common, IP18 6AH	church building		30 March 2000	TM5056176244; 52°19′37″N 1°40′33″E		1384451	Church of the Sacred Heart, and Attached Presbytery More images	Q26664294

== See also ==
- Grade I listed buildings in Suffolk
- Grade II* listed buildings in Suffolk

== Sources ==
- Bettely, James; Pevsner, Nikolaus (2015) [1961], Suffolk: East, The Buildings of England, New Haven and London: Yale University Press, ISBN 978-0-300-19654-2
