= Listed buildings in Aldeburgh =

Civil Parish in Suffolk, England

Aldeburgh is a town and civil parish in the East Suffolk district of Suffolk, England. It contains 63 listed buildings that are recorded in the National Heritage List for England. Of these one is grade I, two are grade II* and 60 are grade II.

This list is based on the information retrieved online from Historic England.

== Key ==
Grade	Criteria
I	Buildings that are of exceptional interest
II*	Particularly important buildings of more than special interest
II	Buildings that are of special interest

== Listing ==
Name	Grade	Location	Type	Completed (Note: The date given is the date used by Historic England as significant for the initial building or that of an important part in the structure's description.)	Date designated	Grid ref. (Note: The grid reference is based on the British national grid reference system, sometimes known as OSGB36, used by the Ordnance Survey.) Geo-coordinates	Notes	Entry number (Note: The "List Entry Number" is a unique number assigned to each listed building and scheduled monument by Historic England.)	Image	Wikidata
3 Church Walk and Attached Walls to North, East and South, Including Garage	II	3 Church Walk, IP15 5DU			4 December 2000	TM4636056736; 52°09′14″N 1°36′00″E		1247244	Upload Photo	Q26539571
9 Church Walk, Including Associated Store	II	9 Church Walk, IP15 5DU			30 January 2025	TM4635756694; 52°09′13″N 1°36′00″E		1489473	Upload Photo	Q136386082
Alde House	II	Alde House Drive			27 February 1950	TM4623056629; 52°09′11″N 1°35′53″E		1269764	Upload Photo	Q26559860
Adair Lodge	II	Church Walk			16 August 1974	TM4642256744; 52°09′14″N 1°36′03″E		1269765	Upload Photo	Q26559861
Swiss Cottage	II	1, Crabbe Street			9 July 1996	TM4651556829; 52°09′17″N 1°36′09″E		1269767	Upload Photo	Q26559863
Cross Keys Inn	II	18, Crabbe Street	inn		27 February 1950	TM4650256617; 52°09′10″N 1°36′07″E		1269768	Cross Keys Inn More images	Q26559864
Aldeburgh War Memorial	II	Crabbe Street	war memorial		29 January 2020	TM4654856829; 52°09′17″N 1°36′10″E		1468086	Aldeburgh War Memorial More images	Q97451475
Ocean Strand	II	9, Crag Path			9 July 1996	TM4652656638; 52°09′11″N 1°36′09″E		1269769	Upload Photo	Q26559865
Strafford House	II	33, Crag Path, IP15 5BT			27 February 1950	TM4649456354; 52°09′01″N 1°36′06″E		1269770	Upload Photo	Q26559866
The North Lookout	II	Crag Path	architectural structure		16 August 1974	TM4653856567; 52°09′08″N 1°36′09″E		1269771	The North Lookout More images	Q26559867
The South Lookout	II	Crag Path	architectural structure		16 August 1974	TM4651656371; 52°09′02″N 1°36′07″E		1269772	The South Lookout More images	Q26559868
Union Baptist Chapel Including Forecourt Railings, Gates and Gate Piers	II	Gates And Gate Piers, High Street			27 February 1950	TM4642456431; 52°09′04″N 1°36′03″E		1269751	Upload Photo	Q26559847
Crespigny House	II	Hartington Road			27 February 1950	TM4638756313; 52°09′00″N 1°36′00″E		1269773	Upload Photo	Q26559869
84, High Street	II	84, High Street			16 August 1974	TM4648456654; 52°09′11″N 1°36′06″E		1269774	Upload Photo	Q26559870
Bell Cottage	II	93, High Street			16 August 1974	TM4645256610; 52°09′10″N 1°36′05″E		1269732	Upload Photo	Q26559828
Dart Cottage	II	99, High Street			16 August 1974	TM4645056596; 52°09′09″N 1°36′04″E		1269733	Upload Photo	Q26559829
Aldeburgh Pharmacy	II	125, High Street			16 August 1974	TM4644856517; 52°09′07″N 1°36′04″E		1269734	Upload Photo	Q26559830
Old Cottage Tyne Cottage	II	150, High Street			16 August 1974	TM4647856480; 52°09′06″N 1°36′06″E		1269735	Upload Photo	Q26559831
The Suffolk	II	152, High Street			27 February 1950	TM4647856467; 52°09′05″N 1°36′06″E		1269736	Upload Photo	Q26559832
170 and 172, High Street	II	170 and 172, High Street			27 February 1950	TM4646956411; 52°09′03″N 1°36′05″E		1269737	Upload Photo	Q26559833
Lewis House	II	175 and 175a, High Street			9 July 1996	TM4643856372; 52°09′02″N 1°36′03″E		1269738	Upload Photo	Q26559834
Numbers 213a and 215 Incorporating Number 213	II	213, 213a, 215, High Street			16 August 1974	TM4641856250; 52°08′58″N 1°36′02″E		1269739	Upload Photo	Q26559835
Dutch Flat Gosfield Cottage the Nutshell	II	217, High Street			16 August 1974	TM4641756239; 52°08′58″N 1°36′02″E		1269740	Upload Photo	Q26559836
White Hart Inn	II	222, High Street	pub		27 February 1950	TM4644856272; 52°08′59″N 1°36′04″E		1269741	White Hart Inn More images	Q26559837
The Old Custom House	II	223, High Street	house		27 February 1950	TM4641556224; 52°08′57″N 1°36′02″E		1269742	The Old Custom House More images	Q26559838
Lavender Cottage Rosemary Cottage	II	227, High Street			27 February 1950	TM4641356218; 52°08′57″N 1°36′02″E		1269743	Upload Photo	Q26559839
229 and 229a, High Street	II	229 and 229a, High Street			27 February 1950	TM4641156207; 52°08′57″N 1°36′01″E		1269744	Upload Photo	Q26559840
End Cottage the Sun Trap	II	235, High Street			16 August 1974	TM4640756189; 52°08′56″N 1°36′01″E		1269745	Upload Photo	Q26559841
Cranstons	II	239, High Street			16 August 1974	TM4639956178; 52°08′56″N 1°36′01″E		1269746	Upload Photo	Q26559842
259, High Street	II	259, High Street			9 July 1996	TM4639156110; 52°08′54″N 1°36′00″E		1269749	Upload Photo	Q26559845
267,269,271, High Street	II	267, 269, 271, High Street			9 July 1996	TM4639156088; 52°08′53″N 1°36′00″E		1269750	Upload Photo	Q26559846
Half Crown Cottage	II	14, King Street			16 August 1974	TM4648056179; 52°08′56″N 1°36′05″E		1269752	Upload Photo	Q26559848
Gorsehill	II	Leiston Road			9 July 1996	TM4564258312; 52°10′06″N 1°35′27″E		1269753	Upload Photo	Q26559849
Red House	II	Leiston Road	house		27 February 1950	TM4546857880; 52°09′52″N 1°35′16″E		1269711	Red House More images	Q26559810
8-14, Market Cross Place	II	8-14, Market Cross Place			9 July 1996	TM4654856959; 52°09′21″N 1°36′11″E		1269712	Upload Photo	Q26559811
White Lion Hotel	II	15 and 16, Market Cross Place	hotel		27 February 1950	TM4653856908; 52°09′19″N 1°36′10″E		1269713	White Lion Hotel More images	Q26559812
Market Cross House	II	17, Market Cross Place			16 August 1974	TM4653556884; 52°09′19″N 1°36′10″E		1269714	Upload Photo	Q26559813
Moot House	II	18, Market Cross Place			27 February 1950	TM4652956873; 52°09′18″N 1°36′09″E		1269715	Upload Photo	Q26559814
Moot Hall	I	Market Cross Place	house		27 February 1950	TM4655256862; 52°09′18″N 1°36′11″E		1269716	Moot Hall More images	Q17527129
Oakley House	II	Oakley Square			16 August 1974	TM4651556545; 52°09′08″N 1°36′08″E		1269717	Upload Photo	Q26559815
Priors Hill	II	48, Park Road			9 July 1996	TM4607356478; 52°09′06″N 1°35′44″E		1269718	Upload Photo	Q26559816
Dolphin House	II	Priors Hill Road			16 August 1974	TM4595856537; 52°09′08″N 1°35′38″E		1269719	Upload Photo	Q26559817
Sandhill	II	Priors Hill Road			16 August 1974	TM4596456471; 52°09′06″N 1°35′39″E		1269720	Upload Photo	Q26559818
Water Tower	II	Priors Hill Road			9 July 1996	TM4605056564; 52°09′09″N 1°35′43″E		1269722	Upload Photo	Q26559820
Aldeburgh Hall	II	Saxmundham Road			27 February 1950	TM4570457110; 52°09′27″N 1°35′27″E		1269723	Upload Photo	Q26559821
Martello Tower	II*	Slaughdon	Martello tower		27 February 1950	TM4629554908; 52°08′15″N 1°35′52″E		1269724	Martello Tower More images	Q17546462
1 and 3, Town Steps	II	1 and 3, Town Steps			16 August 1974	TM4644256598; 52°09′09″N 1°36′04″E		1269725	Upload Photo	Q26559822
2-10, Town Steps	II	2-10, Town Steps			16 August 1974	TM4643956586; 52°09′09″N 1°36′04″E		1269726	Upload Photo	Q26559823
Cherry Cottage	II	13, Town Steps			16 August 1974	TM4642856603; 52°09′10″N 1°36′03″E		1269727	Upload Photo	Q26559824
Water Pump	II	Town Steps			9 July 1996	TM4642156592; 52°09′09″N 1°36′03″E		1269728	Upload Photo	Q26559825
Wyndham House	II	1 and 2, Victoria Road			27 February 1950	TM4646456874; 52°09′18″N 1°36′06″E		1269729	Upload Photo	Q26559826
Church Farmhouse	II	11, Victoria Road			16 August 1974	TM4621756898; 52°09′19″N 1°35′53″E		1269730	Upload Photo	Q26559827
Church of St Peter and St Paul	II*	Victoria Road	church building		27 February 1950	TM4635156851; 52°09′18″N 1°36′00″E		1269731	Church of St Peter and St Paul More images	Q15979481
Group of Seven Chest Tombs Approximately Seven Metres East of Chancel of Church of St Peter and St Paul	II	Victoria Road			9 July 1996	TM4636656848; 52°09′18″N 1°36′01″E		1269690	Upload Photo	Q26559790
Group of Three Chest Tombs Approximately Eleven Metres South East of Church of St Peter and St Paul	II	Victoria Road			9 July 1996	TM4637956847; 52°09′18″N 1°36′01″E		1269691	Upload Photo	Q26559791
Lifeboat Disaster Monument Approximately Eighty Five Metres North East of the Church of St Peter and St Paul	II	Victoria Road			9 July 1996	TM4643556906; 52°09′19″N 1°36′05″E		1269692	Upload Photo	Q26559792
Mill Inn	II	Victoria Road	pub		27 February 1950	TM4652656856; 52°09′18″N 1°36′09″E		1269694	Mill Inn More images	Q26559794
Monument Approximately Three Metres West of North Vestry of Church of St Peter and St Paul	II	Victoria Road			9 July 1996	TM4634556872; 52°09′18″N 1°36′00″E		1269693	Upload Photo	Q26559793
Thelluson Lodge	II	Victoria Road, IP15 5DT			27 February 1950	TM4640656810; 52°09′16″N 1°36′03″E		1269766	Upload Photo	Q26559862
Uplands Hotel	II	Victoria Road			9 July 1996	TM4627256832; 52°09′17″N 1°35′56″E		1269695	Upload Photo	Q26559795
North House	II	1, Wentworth Road			16 August 1974	TM4654257075; 52°09′25″N 1°36′11″E		1269696	Upload Photo	Q26559796
Tiffany House	II	3, Wentworth Road			16 August 1974	TM4654357067; 52°09′24″N 1°36′11″E		1269697	Upload Photo	Q26559797
Garden House Fifty Metres West of Tiffany House (number Three)	II	Wentworth Road			9 July 1996	TM4650757086; 52°09′25″N 1°36′09″E		1269698	Upload Photo	Q26559798

== See also ==
- Grade I listed buildings in Suffolk
- Grade II* listed buildings in Suffolk

== Sources ==
- Bettely, James; Pevsner, Nikolaus (2015) [1961], Suffolk: West, The Buildings of England, New Haven and London: Yale University Press, ISBN 978-0-300-19655-9
