= Listed buildings in Saxmundham =

Civil Parish in Suffolk, England

Saxmundham is a town and civil parish in the East Suffolk District of Suffolk, England. It contains 49 listed buildings that are recorded in the National Heritage List for England. Of these two are grade II* and 47 are grade II.

This list is based on the information retrieved online from Historic England.

== Key ==
Grade	Criteria
I	Buildings that are of exceptional interest
II*	Particularly important buildings of more than special interest
II	Buildings that are of special interest

== Listing ==
Name	Grade	Location	Type	Completed (Note: The date given is the date used by Historic England as significant for the initial building or that of an important part in the structure's description.)	Date designated	Grid ref. (Note: The grid reference is based on the British national grid reference system, sometimes known as OSGB36, used by the Ordnance Survey.) Geo-coordinates	Notes	Entry number (Note: The "List Entry Number" is a unique number assigned to each listed building and scheduled monument by Historic England.)	Image	Wikidata
1-15, Albion Street	II	1-15, Albion Street			6 September 1974	TM3847563136; 52°12′53″N 1°29′22″E		1268179	Upload Photo	Q26558519
10 and 12, Albion Street	II	10 and 12, Albion Street			6 September 1974	TM3843463114; 52°12′53″N 1°29′20″E		1268180	Upload Photo	Q26558520
Chantry Cottages	II	2-12, Chantry Road			6 September 1974	TM3854363033; 52°12′50″N 1°29′26″E		1268181	Upload Photo	Q26558521
14 and 16, Chantry Road	II	14 and 16, Chantry Road			6 September 1974	TM3852663034; 52°12′50″N 1°29′25″E		1268182	Upload Photo	Q26558522
Church House	II	Church Street			6 September 1974	TM3884662992; 52°12′48″N 1°29′41″E		1268183	Upload Photo	Q26558523
Church of St John Baptist	II*	Church Street	church building		18 July 1949	TM3890062941; 52°12′46″N 1°29′44″E		1268184	Church of St John Baptist More images	Q17546459
Fairfield House East, Fairfield House South, Brook Farmhouse	II	Fairfield House South, Brook Farmhouse, Fairfield Drive			6 September 1974	TM3842163488; 52°13′05″N 1°29′20″E		1268185	Upload Photo	Q26558524
Market Hall, Front Steps and Attached Railings	II	Front Steps And Attached Railings, High Street			25 September 1996	TM3864863142; 52°12′53″N 1°29′31″E		1365984	Upload Photo	Q26647621
2, High Street	II	2, High Street			6 September 1974	TM3864963031; 52°12′50″N 1°29′31″E		1268186	Upload Photo	Q26558525
6, 6a and 8, High Street	II	6, 6a and 8, High Street			6 September 1974	TM3865663057; 52°12′50″N 1°29′32″E		1268187	Upload Photo	Q26558526
10, High Street	II	10, High Street			6 September 1974	TM3866063069; 52°12′51″N 1°29′32″E		1268188	Upload Photo	Q26558527
Holly Lodge	II	12, High Street			6 September 1974	TM3869363061; 52°12′50″N 1°29′33″E		1268189	Upload Photo	Q26558528
White Hart Hotel	II	18, High Street	hotel		6 September 1974	TM3867463100; 52°12′52″N 1°29′33″E		1268190	White Hart Hotel More images	Q26558529
23, High Street	II	23, High Street			6 September 1974	TM3865763116; 52°12′52″N 1°29′32″E		1268191	Upload Photo	Q26558530
25 and 27, High Street	II	25 and 27, High Street			6 September 1974	TM3866163128; 52°12′53″N 1°29′32″E		1268192	Upload Photo	Q26558531
26, 26a and 26b, High Street	II	26, 26a and 26b, High Street			6 September 1974	TM3868963151; 52°12′53″N 1°29′33″E		1268193	Upload Photo	Q26558532
28 and 30, High Street	II	28 and 30, High Street			25 September 1996	TM3868763185; 52°12′54″N 1°29′33″E		1268194	Upload Photo	Q26558533
Bell Hotel	II	31, High Street	hotel		6 September 1974	TM3866363155; 52°12′54″N 1°29′32″E		1268195	Bell Hotel More images	Q26558534
35, High Street	II	35, High Street			25 September 1996	TM3867563179; 52°12′54″N 1°29′33″E		1268197	Upload Photo	Q26558536
39, High Street	II	39, High Street			6 September 1974	TM3866963202; 52°12′55″N 1°29′33″E		1268198	Upload Photo	Q26558537
46, High Street	II	46, High Street			6 September 1974	TM3866963245; 52°12′56″N 1°29′33″E		1365982	Upload Photo	Q26647619
Ashford House	II	High Street			6 September 1974	TM3869263166; 52°12′54″N 1°29′34″E		1365983	Upload Photo	Q26647620
Hurts Hall	II	Hurtshall Park	house		25 September 1996	TM3895862544; 52°12′33″N 1°29′46″E		1268178	Hurts Hall More images	Q26558518
33, High Street (see Details for Further Address Information)	II	1 and 3, Market Place			6 September 1974	TM3867163173; 52°12′54″N 1°29′33″E		1268196	Upload Photo	Q26558535
Old Bank House Including Railings to Front	II	2, Market Place	house		6 September 1974	TM3864063166; 52°12′54″N 1°29′31″E		1365985	Old Bank House Including Railings to Front More images	Q26647622
4 and 6, Market Place	II	4 and 6, Market Place			6 September 1974	TM3865163180; 52°12′54″N 1°29′32″E		1365986	Upload Photo	Q26647623
7 and 7a, Market Place	II	7 and 7a, Market Place			6 September 1974	TM3866663188; 52°12′55″N 1°29′32″E		1365987	Upload Photo	Q26647624
8, Market Place	II	8, Market Place			6 September 1974	TM3864763191; 52°12′55″N 1°29′31″E		1365988	Upload Photo	Q26647625
9, 11, 15 and 19, Market Place	II	9, 11, 15 and 19, Market Place, Angel Yard			6 September 1974	TM3865663218; 52°12′56″N 1°29′32″E		1365991	Upload Photo	Q26647628
16, Market Place	II	16, Market Place			6 September 1974	TM3863263232; 52°12′56″N 1°29′31″E		1365989	Upload Photo	Q26647626
17, Market Place	II	17, Market Place, Angel Yard			6 September 1974	TM3865963227; 52°12′56″N 1°29′32″E		1365992	Upload Photo	Q26647629
21 and 23, Market Place	II	21 and 23, Market Place, Angel Yard			6 September 1974	TM3865063234; 52°12′56″N 1°29′32″E		1365993	Upload Photo	Q26647630
Wingfield House	II	Market Place			13 March 1991	TM3863163170; 52°12′54″N 1°29′30″E		1365990	Upload Photo	Q26647627
Lynwood House	II	2, North Entrance			6 September 1974	TM3858363348; 52°13′00″N 1°29′28″E		1365994	Upload Photo	Q26647631
Varley House	II	4, North Entrance			6 September 1974	TM3855863411; 52°13′02″N 1°29′27″E		1365995	Upload Photo	Q26647632
The Beeches Including Stable Block	II*	5 and 5a, North Entrance	architectural structure		18 July 1949	TM3859063395; 52°13′01″N 1°29′29″E		1365996	The Beeches Including Stable Block More images	Q17546533
Fairfield Preparatory School	II	6, North Entrance			6 September 1974	TM3854163425; 52°13′02″N 1°29′26″E		1365997	Upload Photo	Q26647633
24, North Entrance	II	24, North Entrance			25 September 1996	TM3853963544; 52°13′06″N 1°29′27″E		1365998	Upload Photo	Q26647634
Brook Cottage	II	North Entrance			18 July 1949	TM3853563593; 52°13′08″N 1°29′27″E		1365999	Upload Photo	Q26647635
Grove Farmhouse	II	Rendham Road			25 October 1951	TM3721464016; 52°13′24″N 1°28′18″E		1199144	Upload Photo	Q26495048
Post Mill Roundhouse	II	Rendham Road			8 August 1995	TM3826263123; 52°12′53″N 1°29′11″E		1366000	Upload Photo	Q26647636
Priory House	II	4, South Entrance			25 September 1996	TM3861063004; 52°12′49″N 1°29′29″E		1366002	Upload Photo	Q26647638
Beech Lawn Cottage	II	8, South Entrance			6 September 1974	TM3859762978; 52°12′48″N 1°29′28″E		1268158	Upload Photo	Q26558500
Beech Lawn House Including Orangery to Rear	II	10, South Entrance			18 July 1949	TM3859562967; 52°12′48″N 1°29′28″E		1268159	Upload Photo	Q26558501
Ivy House	II	12, South Entrance			18 July 1949	TM3859662954; 52°12′47″N 1°29′28″E		1268160	Upload Photo	Q26558502
16, South Entrance	II	16, South Entrance			25 September 1996	TM3857462909; 52°12′46″N 1°29′27″E		1268161	Upload Photo	Q26558503
Monks Cottages	II	22, 24 and 26, South Entrance			18 July 1949	TM3858962855; 52°12′44″N 1°29′27″E		1268162	Upload Photo	Q26558504
The White House	II	28, South Entrance			6 September 1974	TM3857862838; 52°12′43″N 1°29′27″E		1268163	Upload Photo	Q26558505
Crown House	II	30, South Entrance			6 September 1974	TM3858462826; 52°12′43″N 1°29′27″E		1268164	Upload Photo	Q26558506

== See also ==
- Grade I listed buildings in Suffolk
- Grade II* listed buildings in Suffolk

== Sources ==
- Bettely, James; Pevsner, Nikolaus (2015) [1961], Suffolk: East, The Buildings of England, New Haven and London: Yale University Press, ISBN 978-0-300-19654-2
