= Listed buildings in Lowestoft =

Civil Parish in Suffolk, England

Lowestoft is a town and civil parish in the East Suffolk District of Suffolk, England. It contains 99 listed buildings that are recorded in the National Heritage List for England. Of these one is grade I, five are grade II* and 93 are grade II.

This list is based on the information retrieved online from Historic England.

== Key ==
Grade	Criteria
I	Buildings that are of exceptional interest
II*	Particularly important buildings of more than special interest
II	Buildings that are of special interest

== Listing ==
Name	Grade	Location	Type	Completed (Note: The date given is the date used by Historic England as significant for the initial building or that of an important part in the structure's description.)	Date designated	Grid ref. (Note: The grid reference is based on the British national grid reference system, sometimes known as OSGB36, used by the Ordnance Survey.) Geo-coordinates	Notes	Entry number (Note: The "List Entry Number" is a unique number assigned to each listed building and scheduled monument by Historic England.)	Image	Wikidata
Ashurst	II	1 Kirkley Cliff, NR33 0BY			21 June 1993	TM5442291956; 52°27′58″N 1°44′39″E		1207035	Upload Photo	Q26502210
Wellington Esplanade, Lowestoft	II	1 - 24 Wellington Esplanade, NR33 0QQ			21 June 1993	TM5447892050; 52°28′01″N 1°44′42″E		1207048	Upload Photo	Q26502221
South Lodge	II	2 Kirkley Cliff, NR33 0BY			12 January 1989	TM5441391933; 52°27′58″N 1°44′39″E		1279944	Upload Photo	Q26569124
16-28 Victoria Terrace and Eastleigh, 9, 10, and 11 Waterloo Road	II	16-28 Victoria Terrace, NR33 0QJ			21 June 1993	TM5452092133; 52°28′04″N 1°44′45″E		1292405	Upload Photo	Q26580421
Remains of An Aisled Barn at Crown Street Motors	II	30-32 Crown Street West			3 October 1977	TM5496193862; 52°28′59″N 1°45′13″E		1208899	Upload Photo	Q26503965
Raglan Smoke House	II	37 Raglan Street, NR32 2JP			3 October 1977	TM5466393130; 52°28′36″N 1°44′55″E		1292437	Upload Photo	Q26580450
Former Post Office	II	51 London Road North, NR32 1AA			21 June 1993	TM5485392965; 52°28′30″N 1°45′05″E		1292503	Upload Photo	Q26580511
59-59a High Street (former Chemist Shop)	II	59 and 59a High Street, NR32 1JA			26 March 2019	TM5513993762; 52°28′55″N 1°45′22″E		1462138	Upload Photo	Q66480029
Holm View	II	63 High Street, NR32 1JB			3 October 1977	TM5513093724; 52°28′54″N 1°45′22″E		1207029	Upload Photo	Q26502204
The Crown Hotel	II	150 High Street, NR32 1TX	hotel		3 October 1977	TM5511093830; 52°28′58″N 1°45′21″E		1279942	The Crown Hotel More images	Q26569122
The Fish House to the Rear of 312-14 Whapload Road	II	To The Rear Of 312-14 Whapload Road, NR32 1UL			3 October 1977	TM5522794107; 52°29′06″N 1°45′28″E		1207049	Upload Photo	Q26502222
30 High Street	II	NR32 1HY			13 December 1949	TM5516493965; 52°29′02″N 1°45′24″E		1025263	Upload Photo	Q26276052
329 Whapload Road	II	NR23 1UL			20 December 2019	TM5522594177; 52°29′09″N 1°45′28″E		1467786	Upload Photo	Q79976770
53 London Road North	II	NR32 1BJ			21 June 1993	TM5485692983; 52°28′31″N 1°45′05″E		1279946	Upload Photo	Q26569126
Lowestoft War Memorial	II	NR33 0AP	war memorial		12 September 2018	TM5477692585; 52°28′18″N 1°45′00″E		1458627	Lowestoft War Memorial More images	Q66479851
Port House	II	NR32 1BG			3 October 1977	TM5472192758; 52°28′24″N 1°44′57″E		1292511	Upload Photo	Q26580519
Royal Norfolk and Suffolk Yacht Club	II*	NR33 0AQ	yacht club		3 May 1979	TM5480092618; 52°28′19″N 1°45′01″E		1207043	Royal Norfolk and Suffolk Yacht Club More images	Q7374597
Statue of Triton	II	NR33 0QG	statue		21 June 1993	TM5463792212; 52°28′06″N 1°44′51″E		1207047	Statue of Triton More images	Q26502220
Statue of Triton	II	NR33 0AE	statue		21 June 1993	TM5481692559; 52°28′17″N 1°45′02″E		1209835	Statue of Triton More images	Q26679058
United Reformed Church and Former Sunday School	II	NR32 1HB	Protestant church building		3 March 1989	TM5508893357; 52°28′42″N 1°45′18″E		1292506	United Reformed Church and Former Sunday School More images	Q26580514
Pakefield War Memorial	II	Causeway, Pakefield, NR33 0JZ	war memorial		28 August 2018	TM5386790532; 52°27′13″N 1°44′06″E		1458640	Pakefield War Memorial More images	Q66479860
Church of St Margaret	I	Church Road	church building		13 December 1949	TM5415594188; 52°29′11″N 1°44′31″E		1292943	Church of St Margaret More images	Q7589857
Walls and Steps to Crown Score	II	Crown Score			3 October 1977	TM5518993820; 52°28′57″N 1°45′25″E		1207018	Upload Photo	Q26502193
Crown Street Hall	II	Crown Street West			3 October 1977	TM5489393848; 52°28′59″N 1°45′09″E		1279936	Upload Photo	Q26569116
1 and 2, Dukes Head Street	II	1 and 2, Dukes Head Street			3 October 1977	TM5510293701; 52°28′54″N 1°45′20″E		1207019	Upload Photo	Q26502194
Elmtree Farmhouse	II	98, Elmtree Road, Pakefield			3 October 1977	TM5218390781; 52°27′24″N 1°42′38″E		1292892	Upload Photo	Q26580868
Kingsmead	II	14, 15 and 16, Glebe Close			13 December 1949	TM5412595136; 52°29′42″N 1°44′32″E		1209929	Upload Photo	Q26504976
St Margarets House	II	Gordon Road			21 June 1993	TM5502293186; 52°28′37″N 1°45′14″E		1207020	Upload Photo	Q26502195
Church of St Peter	II*	Gunton Church Lane, Gunton	church building		13 December 1949	TM5422995752; 52°30′01″N 1°44′39″E		1208952	Church of St Peter More images	Q17546887
Hillingdon	II	24, Gunton Cliff			6 February 1992	TM5488895179; 52°29′42″N 1°45′13″E		1208953	Upload Photo	Q26504012
The Beeches	II	16, High Beech			13 December 1949	TM5362293889; 52°29′02″N 1°44′02″E		1207021	Upload Photo	Q26502196
2, High Street	II	2, High Street			3 October 1977	TM5512894149; 52°29′08″N 1°45′23″E		1292877	Upload Photo	Q26580854
3, High Street	II	3, High Street			3 October 1977	TM5513094139; 52°29′08″N 1°45′23″E		1207022	Upload Photo	Q26502197
Arnold House	II	4, High Street			3 October 1977	TM5512994127; 52°29′07″N 1°45′23″E		1025275	Upload Photo	Q26276065
Royal Falcon Inn	II	27, High Street	inn		13 December 1949	TM5516793992; 52°29′03″N 1°45′24″E		1207023	Royal Falcon Inn More images	Q26502198
28, High Street	II	28, High Street			13 December 1949	TM5516493979; 52°29′02″N 1°45′24″E		1025286	Upload Photo	Q26276075
29, High Street	II	29, High Street			21 June 1993	TM5516493971; 52°29′02″N 1°45′24″E		1207024	Upload Photo	Q26502199
31 and 32, High Street	II	31 and 32, High Street			13 December 1949	TM5516393958; 52°29′02″N 1°45′24″E		1207025	Upload Photo	Q26502200
33 and 34, High Street	II	33 and 34, High Street			3 October 1977	TM5516293949; 52°29′01″N 1°45′24″E		1025270	Upload Photo	Q26276060
35, High Street	II	35, High Street			13 December 1949	TM5516493938; 52°29′01″N 1°45′24″E		1279937	Upload Photo	Q26569117
36, High Street	II*	36, High Street	building		13 December 1949	TM5516693932; 52°29′01″N 1°45′24″E		1292849	36, High Street More images	Q17546966
St Davids	II	37, High Street			3 October 1977	TM5516093926; 52°29′01″N 1°45′24″E		1209490	Upload Photo	Q26504552
41 and 42, High Street	II	41 and 42, High Street			3 October 1977	TM5515993893; 52°29′00″N 1°45′23″E		1207026	Upload Photo	Q26502201
43 and 44, High Street	II	43 and 44, High Street			21 June 1993	TM5516093879; 52°28′59″N 1°45′24″E		1292620	Upload Photo	Q26580623
45, High Street	II	45, High Street			3 October 1977	TM5515993872; 52°28′59″N 1°45′23″E		1207027	Upload Photo	Q26502202
46, High Street	II	46, High Street			3 October 1977	TM5515893863; 52°28′59″N 1°45′23″E		1292625	Upload Photo	Q26580628
47, High Street	II	47, High Street			3 October 1977	TM5515993858; 52°28′59″N 1°45′23″E		1279938	Upload Photo	Q26569118
48, High Street	II	48, High Street			3 October 1977	TM5515493851; 52°28′58″N 1°45′23″E		1292628	Upload Photo	Q26580631
Crown House Including Railings to Steps and Street Frontage	II	49, High Street			13 December 1949	TM5515593841; 52°28′58″N 1°45′23″E		1207028	Upload Photo	Q26502203
55, High Street	II	55, High Street			13 December 1949	TM5514093791; 52°28′56″N 1°45′22″E		1279939	Upload Photo	Q26569119
Barclays Bank	II	62, High Street			13 December 1949	TM5513293734; 52°28′55″N 1°45′22″E		1292596	Upload Photo	Q26580602
75, 76 and 76a, High Street	II	75, 76 and 76a, High Street			3 October 1977	TM5512493648; 52°28′52″N 1°45′21″E		1209526	Upload Photo	Q26504587
Wildes House	II	80, High Street			13 December 1949	TM5512593624; 52°28′51″N 1°45′21″E		1292604	Upload Photo	Q26580609
81 and 81a, High Street	II	81 and 81a, High Street			3 October 1977	TM5512993610; 52°28′51″N 1°45′21″E		1279940	Upload Photo	Q26569120
82 and 83, High Street	II	82 and 83, High Street			3 October 1977	TM5513393603; 52°28′50″N 1°45′21″E		1292606	Upload Photo	Q26580610
101 High Street	II	101, High Street, NR32 1XW			3 October 1977	TM5512793479; 52°28′46″N 1°45′21″E		1207030	Upload Photo	Q26502205
102, 103 and 104, High Street	II	102, 103 and 104, High Street			3 October 1977	TM5512093468; 52°28′46″N 1°45′20″E		1292575	Upload Photo	Q26580581
134 and 135, High Street	II	134 and 135, High Street			3 October 1977	TM5510693704; 52°28′54″N 1°45′20″E		1207031	Upload Photo	Q26502206
Berfield House	II	148, High Street			3 October 1977	TM5511693798; 52°28′57″N 1°45′21″E		1279941	Upload Photo	Q26569121
149 and 149a-d, High Street	II	149 and 149a-d, High Street			3 October 1977	TM5511993806; 52°28′57″N 1°45′21″E		1207032	Upload Photo	Q26502207
160, High Street	II	160, High Street			3 October 1977	TM5513793926; 52°29′01″N 1°45′22″E		1207033	Upload Photo	Q26502208
49a, 50a and 50b, High Street	II	49a, 50a and 50b, High Street			3 October 1977	TM5514693833; 52°28′58″N 1°45′23″E		1209512	Upload Photo	Q26504573
Numbers 147 and 147a and Attached Screen Wall	II	High Street			3 October 1977	TM5511893790; 52°28′56″N 1°45′21″E		1209567	Upload Photo	Q26504626
Town Hall	II	High Street	city hall		21 June 1993	TM5511593884; 52°28′59″N 1°45′21″E		1279943	Town Hall More images	Q26569123
Richard Henry Reeve Memorial	II	Kensington Road, NR33 0HY			26 April 2019	TM5424491304; 52°27′38″N 1°44′28″E		1463448	Upload Photo	Q66480147
Kirkley Cliff Terrace	II	3-19 Kirkley Cliff Terrace, Kirkley Cliff Road, NR33 0BY			21 June 1993	TM5437491856; 52°27′55″N 1°44′36″E		1209664	Upload Photo	Q26504721
Windsor House	II	21, Kirkley Cliff Road	house		21 June 1993	TM5432791749; 52°27′52″N 1°44′34″E		1207036	Windsor House More images	Q26502211
5, Kirkley Park Road	II	5, Kirkley Park Road			21 June 1993	TM5390891376; 52°27′40″N 1°44′10″E		1209668	Upload Photo	Q26504725
7, Kirkley Park Road	II	7, Kirkley Park Road			21 June 1993	TM5390991408; 52°27′42″N 1°44′11″E		1209710	Upload Photo	Q26504767
90, London Road	II	90, London Road, Pakefield			13 December 1949	TM5337090058; 52°26′59″N 1°43′38″E		1279945	Upload Photo	Q26569125
North Eastern Chapel at Kirkley Cemetery	II	London Road South			20 January 1998	TM5381291142; 52°27′33″N 1°44′05″E		1119709	Upload Photo	Q26413014
South Western Chapel at Kirkley Cemetery	II	London Road South			20 January 1998	TM5377591126; 52°27′33″N 1°44′03″E		1119710	Upload Photo	Q26413015
The Lychgate at Kirkley Cemetery	II	London Road South			20 January 1998	TM5386991045; 52°27′30″N 1°44′07″E		1119708	Upload Photo	Q26413013
Wall and Stable North of Walmer House Abutting Acton Road	II	London Road South, NR33 0PB, Pakefield			3 October 1977	TM5371890832; 52°27′23″N 1°43′59″E		1207037	Upload Photo	Q26502212
Walmer House	II	London Road South, NR33 0PB, Pakefield			3 October 1977	TM5372490819; 52°27′23″N 1°43′59″E		1209716	Upload Photo	Q26504773
Wall to South of Mariners Score	II	Mariners Score			21 June 1993	TM5519693895; 52°29′00″N 1°45′25″E		1207038	Upload Photo	Q26502214
Wedgewood Court	II	1 and 2, North Parade			21 June 1993	TM5489694543; 52°29′21″N 1°45′11″E		1292510	Upload Photo	Q26580518
Park Mansions	II	3 and 4, North Parade			21 June 1993	TM5494194553; 52°29′21″N 1°45′14″E		1207039	Upload Photo	Q26502215
Roman Catholic Church of St Nicholas	II	Pakefield Road, Kirkley	church building		21 June 1993	TM5407591128; 52°27′32″N 1°44′19″E		1207040	Roman Catholic Church of St Nicholas More images	Q26502216
Olney Cottage	II	99, Pakefield Street, NR33 0JT, Pakefield			3 October 1977	TM5372290601; 52°27′16″N 1°43′58″E		1292486	Upload Photo	Q26580496
Croydon Lodge	II	101, Pakefield Street, Pakefield			3 October 1977	TM5370190588; 52°27′15″N 1°43′57″E		1209776	Upload Photo	Q26504825
9, 11 and 13, Saxon Road	II	9, 11 and 13, Saxon Road			3 October 1977	TM5385690446; 52°27′11″N 1°44′05″E		1292454	Upload Photo	Q26580467
Church of St Margaret and All Saints	II*	Saxon Road	church building		13 December 1949	TM5386090496; 52°27′12″N 1°44′05″E		1207045	Church of St Margaret and All Saints More images	Q17546872
10-20, St Margarets Road	II	10-20, St Margarets Road			3 October 1977	TM5503294194; 52°29′10″N 1°45′18″E		1292428	Upload Photo	Q26580442
Church of St Peter and St John	II*	St Peters Road, Kirkley	church building		3 October 1977	TM5405291567; 52°27′46″N 1°44′19″E		1207046	Church of St Peter and St John More images	Q17546883
Curing House North of Number 174	II	St Peters Street			3 October 1977	TM5466393844; 52°28′59″N 1°44′57″E		1209891	Upload Photo	Q26504938
Manor House and Attached Wall, Stables and Coach House to North West	II	Stables And Coach House To North West, Pakefield Street, Pakefield			3 October 1977	TM5375290658; 52°27′18″N 1°44′00″E		1279908	Upload Photo	Q26569092
Church of Our Lady, Star of the Sea Including Boundary Wall to Gordon Road	II	Star Of The Sea, Gordon Road, NR32 1NL	church building		21 June 1993	TM5484193187; 52°28′37″N 1°45′05″E		1208940	Church of Our Lady, Star of the Sea Including Boundary Wall to Gordon Road More images	Q26504001
Grove Farmhouse	II	Stradbroke Road			17 April 1986	TM5256890429; 52°27′12″N 1°42′57″E		1032071	Upload Photo	Q26283452
Jubilee Bridge	II	The Ravine, Belle Vue Park	bridge		21 June 1993	TM5499794517; 52°29′20″N 1°45′17″E		1292404	Jubilee Bridge More images	Q26580420
The Uplands	II	Uplands Road			17 April 1986	TM5168291069; 52°27′34″N 1°42′12″E		1032072	Upload Photo	Q26283454
Maritime Museum	II	Whapload Road	maritime museum		3 October 1977	TM5520294399; 52°29′16″N 1°45′27″E		1292407	Maritime Museum More images	Q24993825
Boudreaux	II	Whitton Close			13 December 1949	TM5232691715; 52°27′54″N 1°42′48″E		1292412	Upload Photo	Q26580428
Steps and Wall on South Side of Wildes Score	II	Wildes Score			3 October 1977	TM5515093612; 52°28′51″N 1°45′22″E		1279909	Upload Photo	Q26569093
Denes High School	II	Yarmouth Road			21 June 1993	TM5458894592; 52°29′23″N 1°44′55″E		1207050	Upload Photo	Q7729729
Gunton Hall	II	Yarmouth Road, Gunton			3 October 1977	TM5374196269; 52°30′19″N 1°44′15″E		1279910	Upload Photo	Q26569094
High Lighthouse Including North Cottage and South Cottage	II	Yarmouth Road	lighthouse		13 December 1949	TM5508894308; 52°29′13″N 1°45′21″E		1209999	High Lighthouse Including North Cottage and South Cottage More images	Q3739791
Naval War Memorial	II	Yarmouth Road, Bellevue Park	war memorial		3 October 2000	TM5505894465; 52°29′18″N 1°45′20″E		1385386	Naval War Memorial More images	Q26665173
Stables to North of Gunton Hall	II	Yarmouth Road, Gunton			3 October 1977	TM5373096324; 52°30′21″N 1°44′15″E		1210011	Upload Photo	Q26505055

== See also ==
- Grade I listed buildings in Suffolk
- Grade II* listed buildings in Suffolk

== Sources ==
- Bettely, James; Pevsner, Nikolaus (2015) [1961], Suffolk: East, The Buildings of England, New Haven and London: Yale University Press, ISBN 978-0-300-19654-2
