= Grade II* listed buildings in Waveney =

There are over 20,000 Grade II* listed buildings in England. This page is a list of these buildings in the district of Waveney in Suffolk.

== Waveney ==
Name	Location	Type	Completed (Note: The date given is the date used by Historic England as significant for the initial building or that of an important part in the structure's description.)	Date designated	Grid ref. (Note: Sometimes known as OSGB36, the grid reference is based on the British national grid reference system used by the Ordnance Survey.) Geo-coordinates	Entry number (Note: The "List Entry Number" is a unique number assigned to each listed building and scheduled monument by Historic England.)	Image
Brook Farmhouse	All Saints and St. Nicholas, South Elmham	Farmhouse	Early to mid 16th century	27 April 1987	TM3205082726; 52°23′36″N 1°24′33″E	1352625	Upload Photo
The Elms	All Saints, All Saints and St. Nicholas, South Elmham	Farmhouse	15th century	16 March 1972	TM3325182488; 52°23′26″N 1°25′36″E	1352623	The Elms More images
Whaley's	All Saints, All Saints and St. Nicholas, South Elmham	Farmhouse	Mid to late 16th century	27 April 1987	TM3394682489; 52°23′25″N 1°26′12″E	1032000	Upload Photo
White House	All Saints and St. Nicholas, South Elmham	Farmhouse	c. 1600	1 September 1953	TM3417582929; 52°23′39″N 1°26′26″E	1284035	Upload Photo
Church of St John the Baptist	Barnby	Parish Church	Medieval	17 April 1986	TM4807389938; 52°27′04″N 1°38′58″E	1032106	Church of St John the Baptist More images
Ashmans Hall	Barsham	Country House	c. 1820	1 September 1953	TM4128289735; 52°27′08″N 1°32′58″E	1032032	Upload Photo
Northgate House	Beccles	House	18th century	16 March 1948	TM4216290654; 52°27′36″N 1°33′47″E	1205862	Upload Photo
Church of St Michael	Benacre	Parish Church	Medieval	17 April 1986	TM5116284460; 52°24′02″N 1°41′27″E	1032110	Church of St Michael More images
Church of St Margaret	Stoven, Brampton with Stoven	Tower	Medieval	1 September 1953	TM4479281610; 52°22′40″N 1°35′43″E	1032100	Church of St Margaret More images
Ollands and The Gables	St John's Rd, Bungay	Houses	Post 1654	9 May 1949	TM3409689176; 52°27′01″N 1°26′37″E	1275692	Upload Photo
Roman Catholic Church of St Edmund	Bungay	Roman Catholic Church	1889-1901	5 March 1998	TM3369589680; 52°27′18″N 1°26′17″E	1376754	Roman Catholic Church of St Edmund More images
Rose Hall	Upper Olland St, Bungay	House	1739	9 May 1949	TM3371689316; 52°27′06″N 1°26′17″E	1275077	Upload Photo
Trinity Hall	Staithe Rd, Bungay	House	18th century	9 May 1949	TM3388189756; 52°27′20″N 1°26′27″E	1216991	Trinity Hall More images
Church of St Peter	Carlton Colville	Parish Church	Medieval	17 April 1986	TM5100090143; 52°27′05″N 1°41′33″E	1352577	Church of St Peter More images
Church of St Bartholomew	Corton	Parish Church	Medieval	27 November 1954	TM5384498062; 52°31′17″N 1°44′25″E	1352637	Church of St Bartholomew More images
Church of St Mary	Flixton, The Saints	Parish Church	Before 1086	1 September 1953	TM3121186693; 52°25′45″N 1°23′58″E	1031989	Church of St Mary More images
Dovecote at Flixton Hall	Flixton, The Saints	Dovecote	Early 17th century	1 September 1953	TM3049285903; 52°25′21″N 1°23′18″E	1031986	Upload Photo
Hill Farmhouse	Flixton, The Saints	Farmhouse	Early 16th century	27 April 1987	TM3140487151; 52°26′00″N 1°24′10″E	1031987	Upload Photo
Church of St Mary the Virgin	Halesworth	Church	14th century	21 October 1949	TM3860277364; 52°20′33″N 1°30′05″E	1267069	Church of St Mary the Virgin More images
Former Almshouses	Halesworth	Shop	1949	21 October 1949	TM3859077321; 52°20′31″N 1°30′04″E	1224060	Former Almshouses
Gothic House	1, London Road, Halesworth	House	1603-1625	21 October 1949	TM3866577335; 52°20′32″N 1°30′08″E	1239856	Gothic House More images
The Social Club	Halesworth	Jettied House	16th century	21 October 1949	TM3853777404; 52°20′34″N 1°30′02″E	1223564	The Social Club More images
Church of St Peter	Holton	Parish Church	Medieval	1 September 1953	TM4025677875; 52°20′47″N 1°31′34″E	1352566	Church of St Peter More images
Church of St John the Baptist	Lound	Parish Church	Medieval	27 November 1954	TM5063498995; 52°31′52″N 1°41′38″E	1183409	Church of St John the Baptist More images
Mutford Hall	Mutford	House	19th century	17 April 1986	TM4809787512; 52°25′45″N 1°38′53″E	1352581	Mutford Hall More images
North Cove Hall	North Cove	House	c1760-1770	1 September 1953	TM4648089474; 52°26′51″N 1°37′33″E	1182794	North Cove Hall More images
Manor House	Oulton	House	Late 16th century	13 December 1949	TM5254494862; 52°29′35″N 1°43′08″E	1292479	Upload Photo
Church of St Margaret	Reydon	Parish Church	Medieval	27 November 1954	TM4909478189; 52°20′43″N 1°39′21″E	1032142	Church of St Margaret More images
Church of All Saints	Ringsfield	Parish Church	Medieval	1 September 1953	TM4031588429; 52°26′27″N 1°32′04″E	1032044	Church of All Saints More images
Hatton's Farmhouse	Rumburgh	Farmhouse	C20	23 April 1986	TM3617981752; 52°22′58″N 1°28′08″E	1283698	Upload Photo
Rushmere Hall	Rushmere	Farmhouse	Late 16th century	17 April 1986	TM4924587330; 52°25′38″N 1°39′53″E	1284310	Rushmere Hall More images
Hill Farmhouse	Shadingfield	Farmhouse	Early-Mid 16th century	1 September 1953	TM4346883516; 52°23′44″N 1°34′38″E	1352589	Upload Photo
Moat Farmhouse	Shadingfield	Farmhouse	Mid 16th century	1 September 1953	TM4280485145; 52°24′37″N 1°34′07″E	1032132	Upload Photo
Barn 30 Metres North of Manor Farmhouse	Shipmeadow	Barn	Late 19th century	1 November 1988	TM3790490322; 52°27′32″N 1°30′01″E	1352629	Upload Photo
Church of St Bartholomew	Shipmeadow	Parish Church	Medieval	1 September 1953	TM3820289981; 52°27′21″N 1°30′16″E	1032004	Church of St Bartholomew More images
Barn 70 Metres East North East of Park Farmhouse	Somerleyton, Ashby and Herringfleet	Timber Framed Barn	16th century	29 January 1987	TM5040798202; 52°31′27″N 1°41′24″E	1284051	Barn 70 Metres East North East of Park Farmhouse
Church of St Mary	Somerleyton, Somerleyton, Ashby and Herringfleet	Parish Church	15th century	27 November 1954	TM4930597211; 52°30′57″N 1°40′23″E	1183419	Church of St Mary More images
Herringfleet Marsh Mill	Herringfleet, Somerleyton, Ashby and Herringfleet	Drainage Mill	c. 1820	27 November 1954	TM4654397625; 52°31′14″N 1°37′58″E	1183297	Herringfleet Marsh Mill More images
Kitchen Garden of Somerleyton Hall	Somerleyton Park, Somerleyton, Ashby and Herringfleet	Garden	c. 1846	29 January 1987	TM4923997979; 52°31′21″N 1°40′21″E	1031936	Upload Photo
Somerleyton Hall	Somerleyton Hall, Somerleyton, Ashby and Herringfleet	Country House	16th century	29 January 1987	TM4928397769; 52°31′15″N 1°40′23″E	1198046	Somerleyton Hall More images
Stable Court to Somerleyton Hall	Somerleyton Park, Somerleyton, Ashby and Herringfleet	Courtyard	1846	29 January 1987	TM4930397834; 52°31′17″N 1°40′24″E	1352646	Upload Photo
Church Farmhouse	Sotherton	Farmhouse	Mid 16th century	1 September 1953	TM4415679538; 52°21′34″N 1°35′04″E	1183173	Church Farmhouse More images
Church of St Andrew	Sotherton	Parish Church	Medieval	1 September 1953	TM4412279484; 52°21′32″N 1°35′02″E	1352590	Church of St Andrew More images
Buckenham House	Southwold	House	Early 17th century addition	21 April 1949	TM5076376161; 52°19′34″N 1°40′43″E	1384375	Upload Photo
Lloyds Bank	Southwold	Town House	1716	21 April 1949	TM5080176122; 52°19′33″N 1°40′45″E	1384386	Lloyds Bank More images
Manor House and Manor Gate including Forecourt Walls	Southwold	House	c. 1750	21 April 1949	TM5069976219; 52°19′36″N 1°40′40″E	1384370	Manor House and Manor Gate including Forecourt Walls More images
Sutherland House	56, High Street, Southwold	House	Remodelled early 19th century	21 April 1949	TM5066776289; 52°19′39″N 1°40′38″E	1384369	Upload Photo
Church of St Peter	Spexhall	Parish Church	12th century	1 September 1953	TM3783280175; 52°22′05″N 1°29′32″E	1032046	Church of St Peter More images
The Huntsman and Hounds	Stone Street, Spexhall	Timber Framed House	Mid 16th century	1 September 1953	TM3823582638; 52°23′24″N 1°29′59″E	1032051	The Huntsman and Hounds More images
Church of St John the Baptist	St John, Ilketshall	Parish Church	Medieval	1 September 1953	TM3601887563; 52°26′06″N 1°28′15″E	1032020	Church of St John the Baptist More images
Church of St Lawrence	St Lawrence, Ilketshall	Parish Church	13th century	1 September 1953	TM3677586377; 52°25′27″N 1°28′52″E	1197944	Church of St Lawrence More images
Boundary Farmhouse	St Margaret, Ilketshall	Farmhouse	Early 16th century	1 September 1953	TM3563883460; 52°23′54″N 1°27′44″E	1032023	Boundary Farmhouse More images
Rookery Farmhouse	St Margaret's Green, St Margaret, South Elmham	Farmhouse	16th century	1 September 1953	TM3238683467; 52°23′59″N 1°24′52″E	1198346	Rookery Farmhouse More images
Church of St Mary	South Elmham St. Mary, otherwise Homersfield	Parish Church	12th century	1 September 1953	TM2855985398; 52°25′08″N 1°21′35″E	1031994	Church of St Mary More images
Church of St Peter	St Peter, South Elmham	Parish Church	Norman	1 September 1953	TM3359584809; 52°24′41″N 1°26′00″E	1283860	Church of St Peter More images
St Peter's Hall	St Peter, South Elmham	House	19th century	1 September 1953	TM3360085342; 52°24′58″N 1°26′01″E	1031979	St Peter's Hall More images
Uggeshall Hall	Uggeshall	Farmhouse	C16-C17	17 March 1986	TM4568681510; 52°22′35″N 1°36′30″E	1183331	Uggeshall Hall More images
Beacon Farmhouse	Westhall	Farmhouse	Mid 16th century	1 September 1953	TM4192881381; 52°22′37″N 1°33′11″E	1352610	Beacon Farmhouse More images
Slough Farmhouse	Westhall	Farmhouse	Mid 16th century	23 April 1986	TM3947483078; 52°23′36″N 1°31′06″E	1198991	Upload Photo
Weston Hall	Weston	Country House	Late 16th century	1 September 1953	TM4259087143; 52°25′42″N 1°34′01″E	1032008	Upload Photo
Manor Farmhouse	Wissett	Farmhouse	Early 16th century	23 April 1986	TM3608579678; 52°21′51″N 1°27′58″E	1032067	Upload Photo
The Grange	Wissett	House	16th century	1 September 1953	TM3634279495; 52°21′45″N 1°28′11″E	1199370	Upload Photo
Church of All Saints	Worlingham	Parish Church	Medieval	27 June 1986	TM4451089836; 52°27′06″N 1°35′49″E	1182968	Church of All Saints More images
United Reformed Church	Wrentham	Chapel	1778	27 November 1954	TM4972882703; 52°23′07″N 1°40′06″E	1032152	United Reformed Church More images
Church of St Margaret and All Saints	Saxon Rd, Lowestoft	Parish Church	13th century	13 December 1949	TM5386090496; 52°27′12″N 1°44′05″E	1207045	Church of St Margaret and All Saints More images
Church of St Peter	Gunton, Lowestoft	Parish Church	12th century	13 December 1949	TM5422995752; 52°30′01″N 1°44′39″E	1208952	Church of St Peter More images
Church of St Peter and St John	Kirkley, Lowestoft	Parish Church	Early 15th century	3 October 1977	TM5405291567; 52°27′46″N 1°44′19″E	1207046	Church of St Peter and St John More images
Royal Norfolk and Suffolk Yacht Club	Lowestoft	Sailing Club	1902-03	3 May 1979	TM5480092618; 52°28′19″N 1°45′01″E	1207043	Royal Norfolk and Suffolk Yacht Club More images
36 High Street	Lowestoft	House	1949-50	13 December 1949	TM5516693932; 52°29′01″N 1°45′24″E	1292849	36 High Street More images
