= Bramfield =

Bramfield may refer to:

- Bramfield, Hertfordshire, England
- Bramfield, Suffolk, England
- Bramfield, South Australia, a locality in the District Council of Elliston, South Australia, Australia
