= Ilketshall St John =

Village in Suffolk, England

Coordinates: 52.435°N 1.471°E

St John, Ilketshall
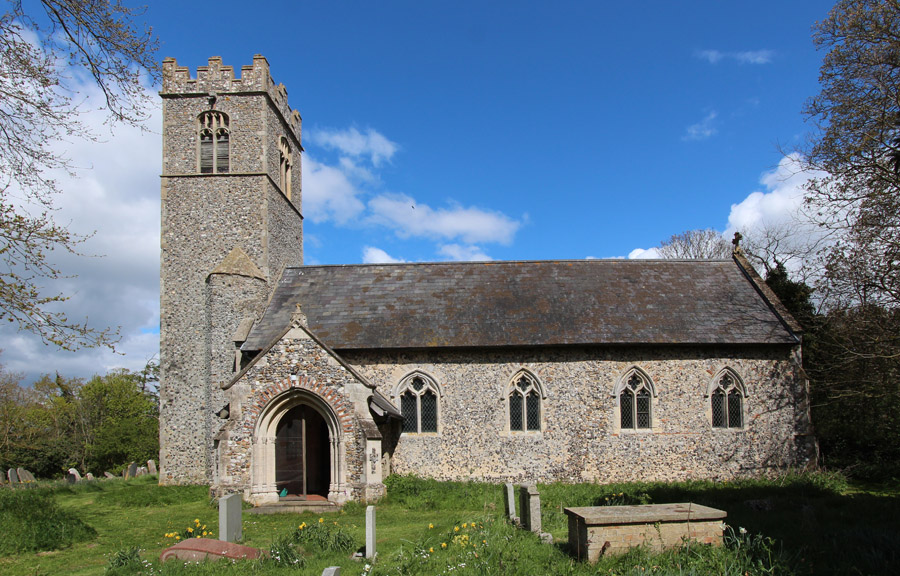
- St John's church

- Location within Suffolk
- Area: 3 km^{2} (1.2 sq mi)
- Population: 40 (2005 est.)
  - Density: 13/km^{2} (34/sq mi)
- OS grid reference: TM361876
- District: East Suffolk
- Shire county: Suffolk
- Region: East
- Country: England
- Sovereign state: United Kingdom
- Post town: Beccles
- Postcode district: NR34
- Dialling code: 01986
- UK Parliament: Waveney

Ilketshall St John is a village and civil parish in the East Suffolk district of the English county of Suffolk. It is 2 miles (3.2 km) south-east of the market town of Bungay and is part of a group of parishes with similar names known collectively as the Saints.

The parish is sparsely populated and is estimated to have a population of between 40 and 50. (Note: 2011 United Kingdom census population data does not report population figures for parishes where the population is small enough to potential identify individuals. As a result no population figure is available for Ilketshall St John at the census.) It has an area of 3 square kilometres (1.2 mi^{2}) and borders the parishes of Bungay, Mettingham, Shipmeadow, Ilketshall St Andrew, Ilketshall St Lawrence and Ilketshall St Margaret.

The A144 road between Bungay and Halesworth runs through the parish, passing just south of the parish church. Other than the church there are no local services. Mettingham Castle is just to the north of the parish.

== History ==
At the Domesday survey, Ilketshall was recorded as a single settlement with a population of 82 households in Wangford Hundred. Most of the land was held by Hugh d'Avranches, Earl of Chester.

The parish church, which is dedicated to St John the Baptist, was established during the 13th century by Sir James de Ilketshall. The church became part of the holdings of Bungay Nunnery in 1267 when Sir James failed to repay a loan to the nuns. A motte-and-bailey castle, known as The Mount, is located in the east of the parish. This has a series of well preserved earthworks and is a scheduled monument.

The parish has always been sparsely populated. At the 1841 census it had a population of 71. This rose to 87 at the 1881 census and declined during the 20th century, reaching less than 50 by the end of World War II.

During the 1850s, The young Prince of Wales, Prince Albert Edward, the future King Edward VII, lived in the rectory where he was tutored by Charles Féral Tarver, at the time the rector of the parish church.

== St John's Church ==
The parish church is dedicated to John the Baptist and dates from the 13th-century. It is a Grade II* listed building and features a 15th-century tower and octagonal font. A window containing 13th-century glass remains, whilst a large stained glass window was donated by the future Edward VII in 1861. The church was restored in 1860, with the work paid for by the Royal Family.
