= Light aircraft =

Category of aircraft weighing less than 5670 kg

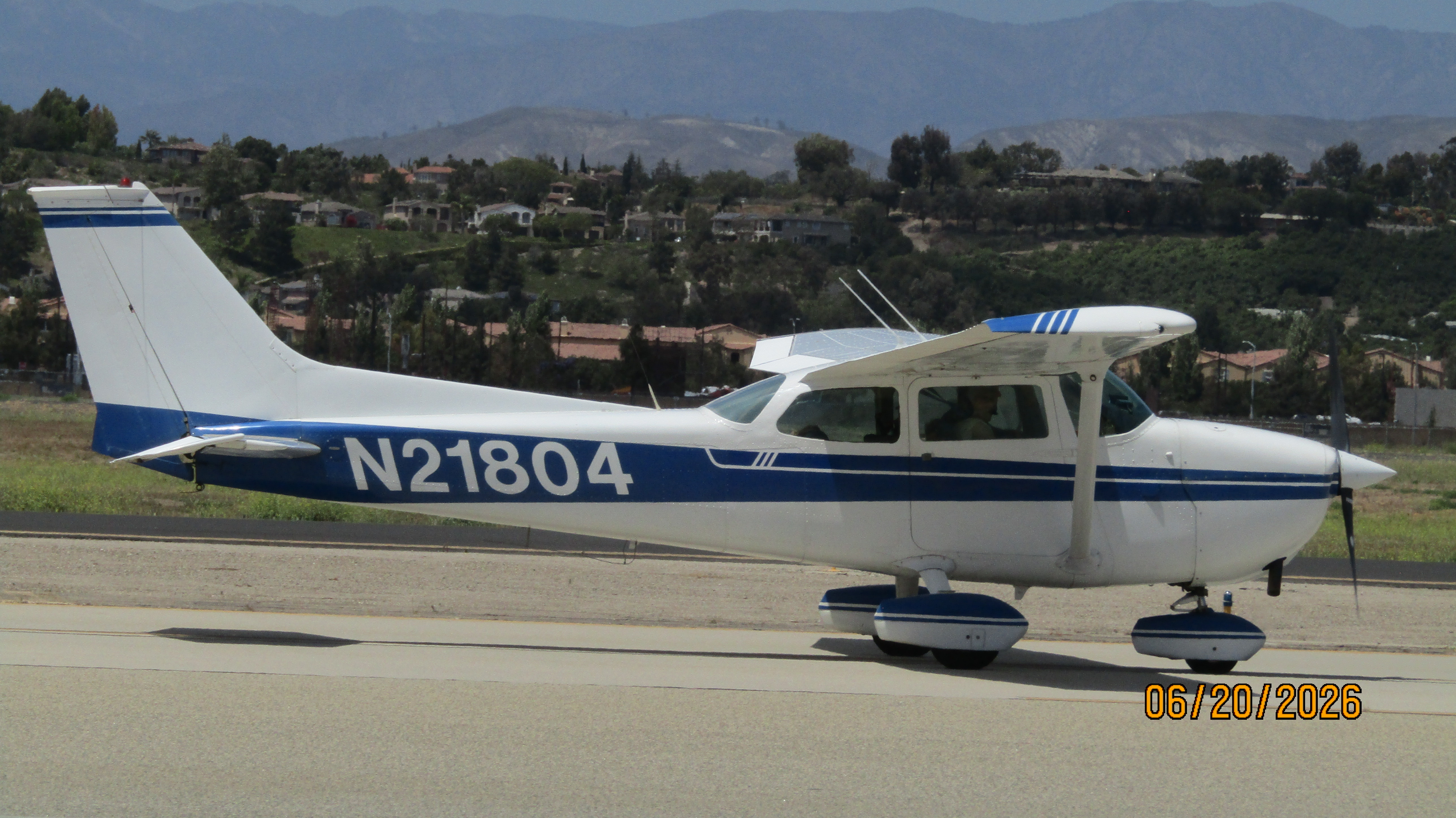
A typical light aircraft: the Cessna 172.

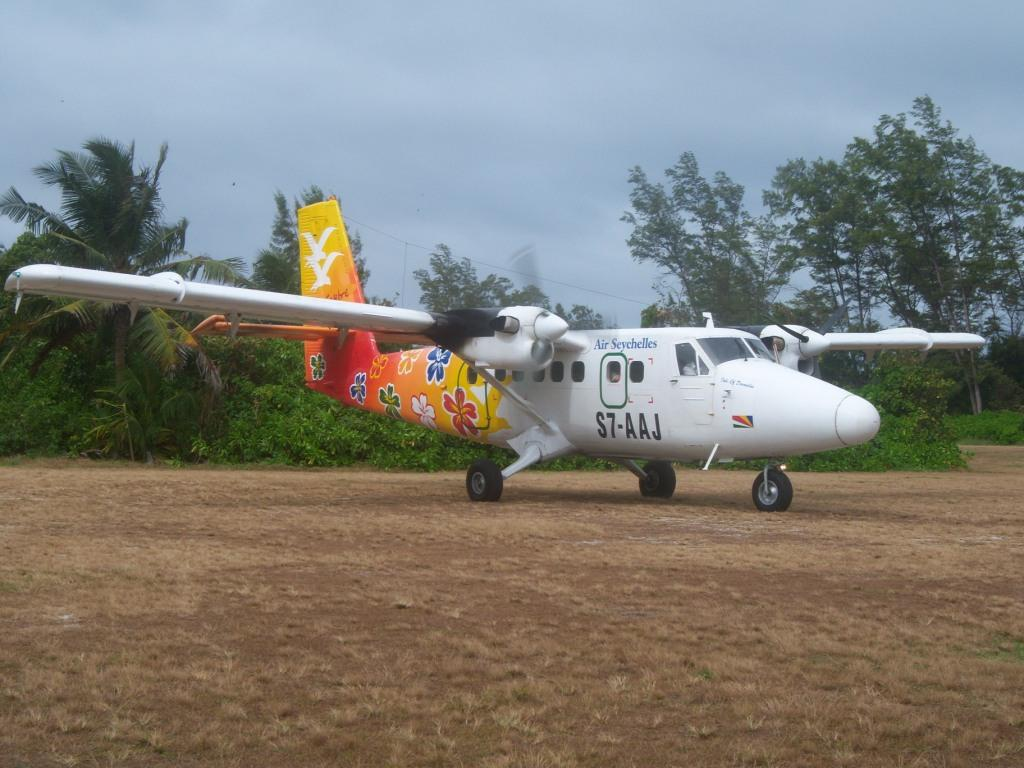
With a maximum gross takeoff weight of 12,500 lbs, the DHC-6 Twin Otter is an example of the upper limit of the light aircraft category.

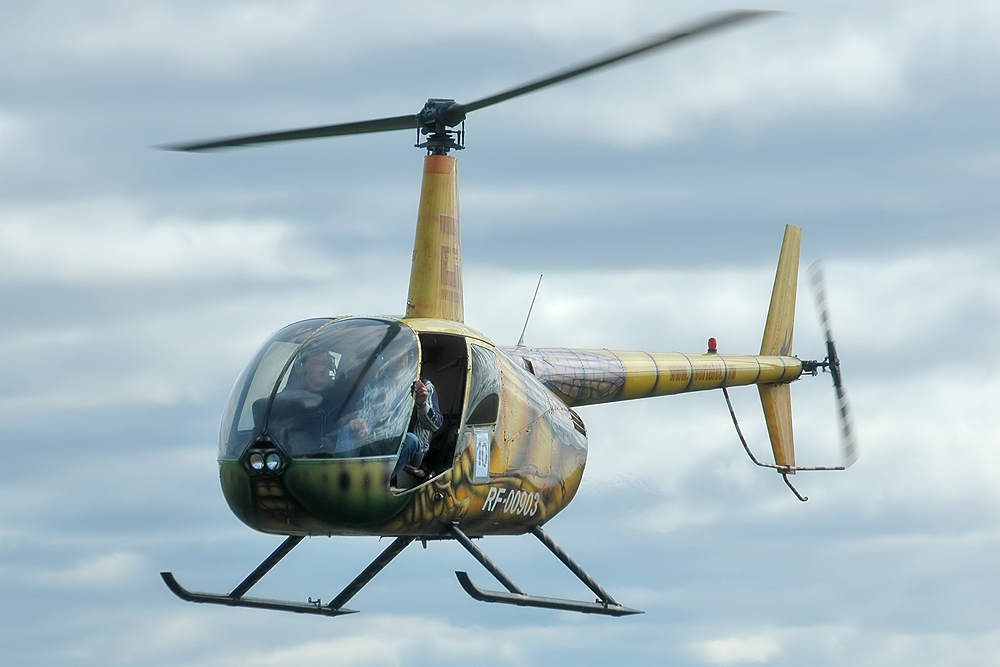
A Robinson R44 light helicopter

A light aircraft is an aircraft that has a maximum gross takeoff weight of 12,500 lb (5,670 kg) or less.

Light aircraft are used as utility aircraft commercially for small-scale passenger and freight transport; for sightseeing, photography, cropdusting, and other so-called aerial work roles of civil aviation; for the personal-use aspect of general aviation; and in certain aspects of military aviation.

Examples of aircraft that are at the maximum gross takeoff weight for this category include the de Havilland Canada DHC-6 Twin Otter and Beechcraft B200 Super King Air.

== Uses ==
Uses include aerial surveying, such as monitoring pipelines, light cargo operations, such as "feeding" cargo hubs, and passenger operations. Light aircraft are used for marketing purposes, such as banner towing and skywriting, and flight instruction. The majority of personal aircraft are light aircraft, the most popular in history being the Cessna 172, and most popular in modern history being the Cirrus SR22 and Robinson R44. Larger light aircraft, such as twin turboprops and very light jets, are often used as business aircraft. Most floatplanes also fall into the category of light aircraft.

== See also ==
- Aviation safety
- Large aircraft, those over 12,500 lb (5,670 kg) MTOW
- Light-sport aircraft
- Light combat aircraft
- List of current production certified light aircraft
- Ultralight aviation
- NEBOair
