= The Market Cart =

Painting by Thomas Gainsborough

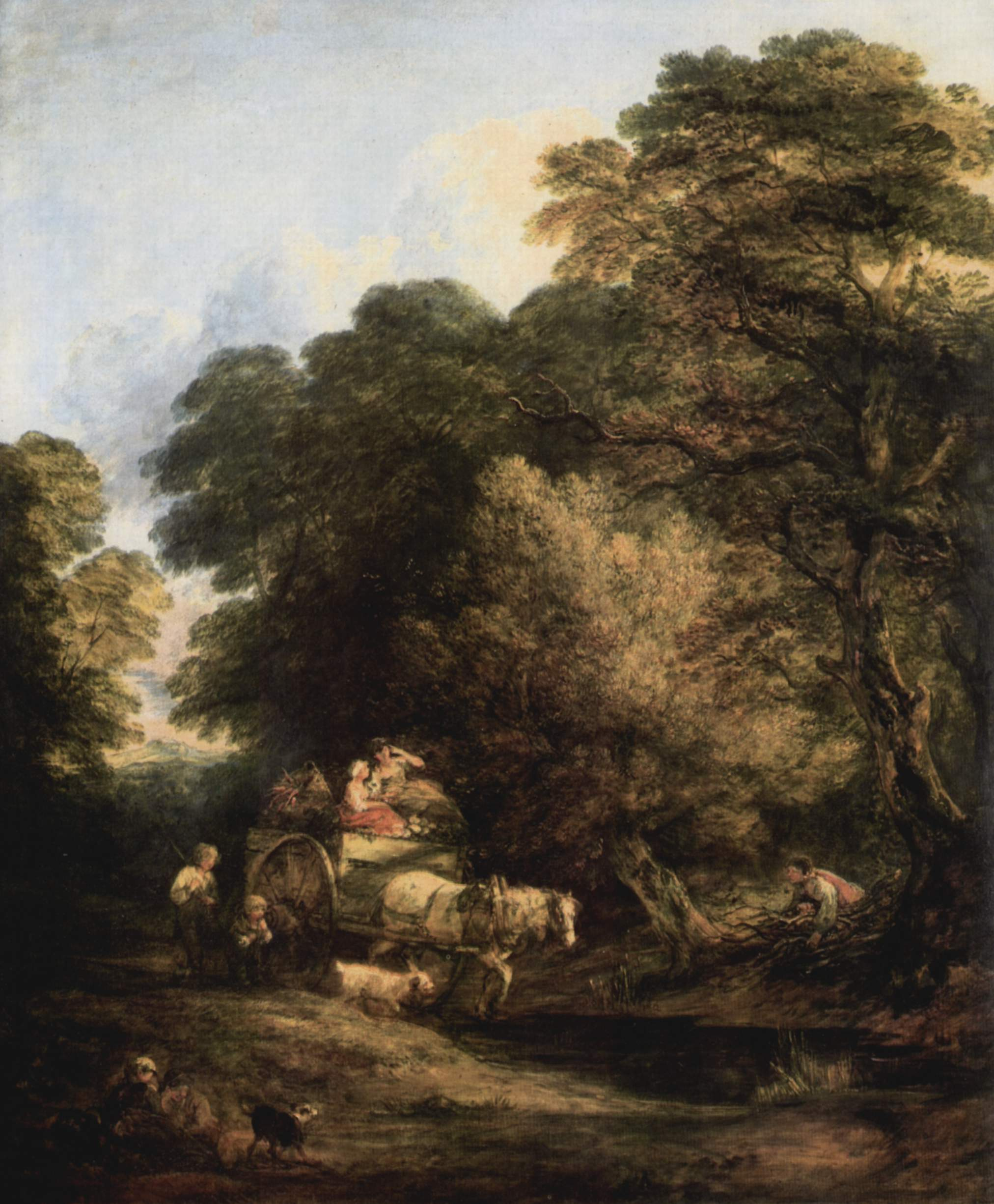
- Artist: Thomas Gainsborough
- Year: 1786
- Medium: Oil on canvas
- Dimensions: 184 cm × 153 cm (72 in × 60 in)
- Location: National Gallery; London

The Market Cart is an oil on canvas painting by the British artist Thomas Gainsborough, from 1786. It is one of his final landscapes, painted about 18 months before his death. It is held in the National Gallery, in London, to which it was presented by the British Institution's governors in 1830.

== Description ==
The painting depicts a horse-drawn cart, with two girls sat aboard, travelling along a woodland path. It was first exhibited at Gainsborough's own home in Pall Mall in 1786. He would later add a figure of a woodman gathering bundles of wood in 1787. William Dutt, in a book published in 1901, claimed that this painting depicted Gainsborough Lane, which later gave its name to part of the South East Area, Ipswich.
