= Carlton Colville Scouts Memorial =

Memorial to Sea Scouts Troop members

Coordinates: 52°27′10″N 1°41′43″E

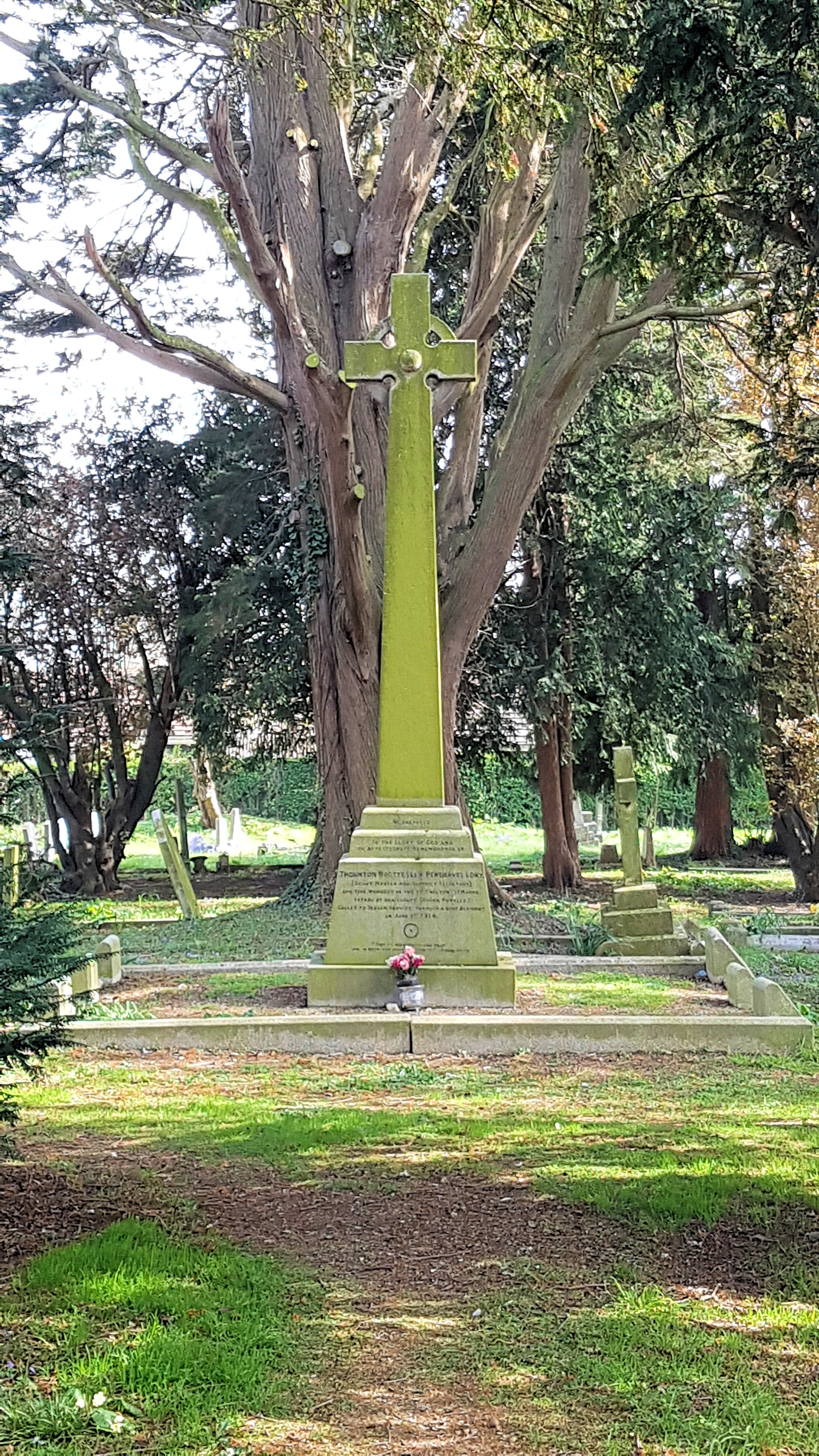
The memorial

The Carlton Colville Scouts Memorial marks the graves of three Boy Scouts and three adult leaders of the 1st Carlton (St Mark's) Sea Scouts Troop, in Carlton Colville, Suffolk, in England who were killed in a boating accident on 1 June 1914. It is also a memorial to the sole survivor of the accident who was killed, two years later, at the Battle of the Somme and his body never found. His name was added to the memorial in 1918. The site received protection as a grade II listed building in 2016.

== Accident ==
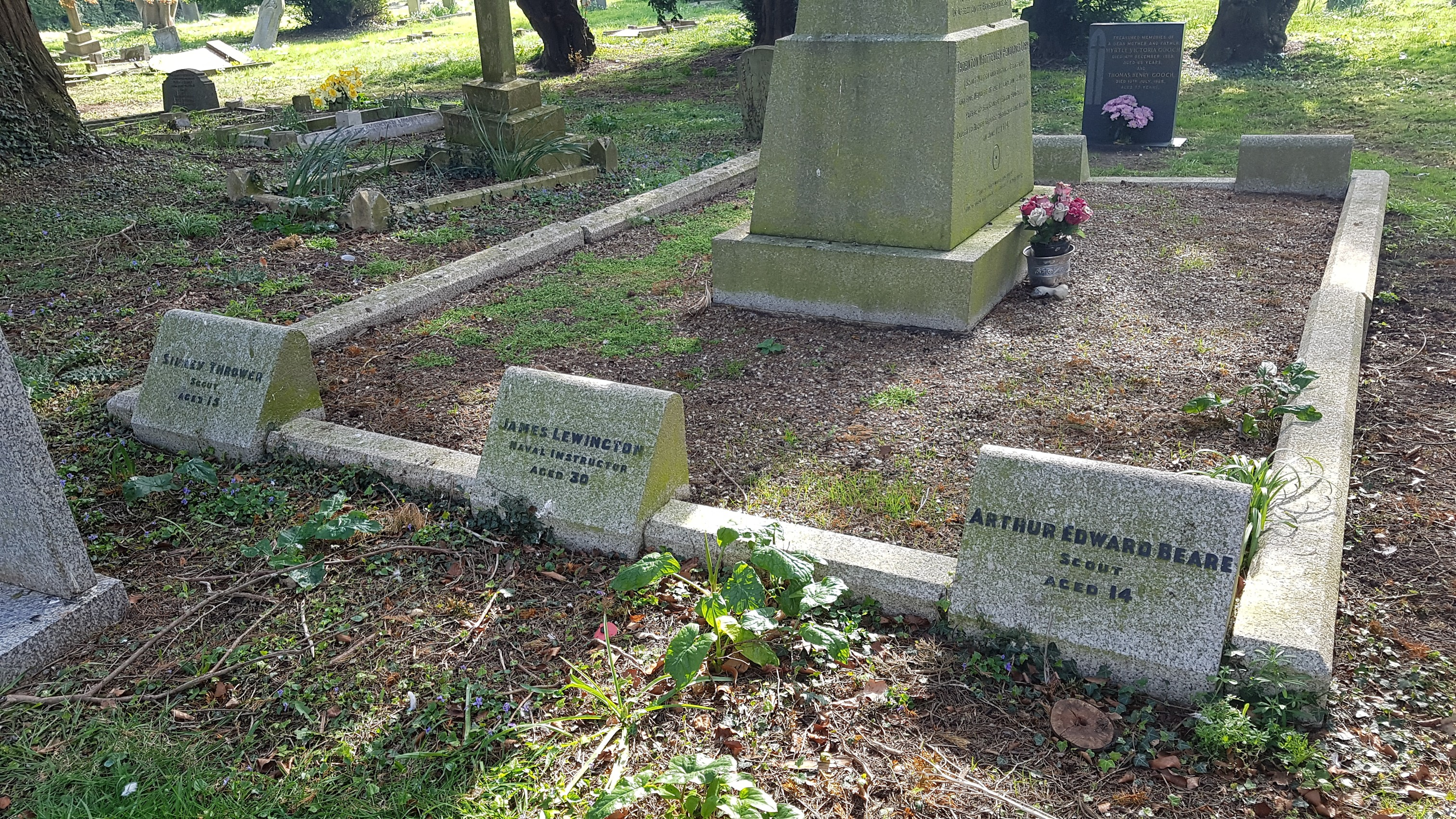
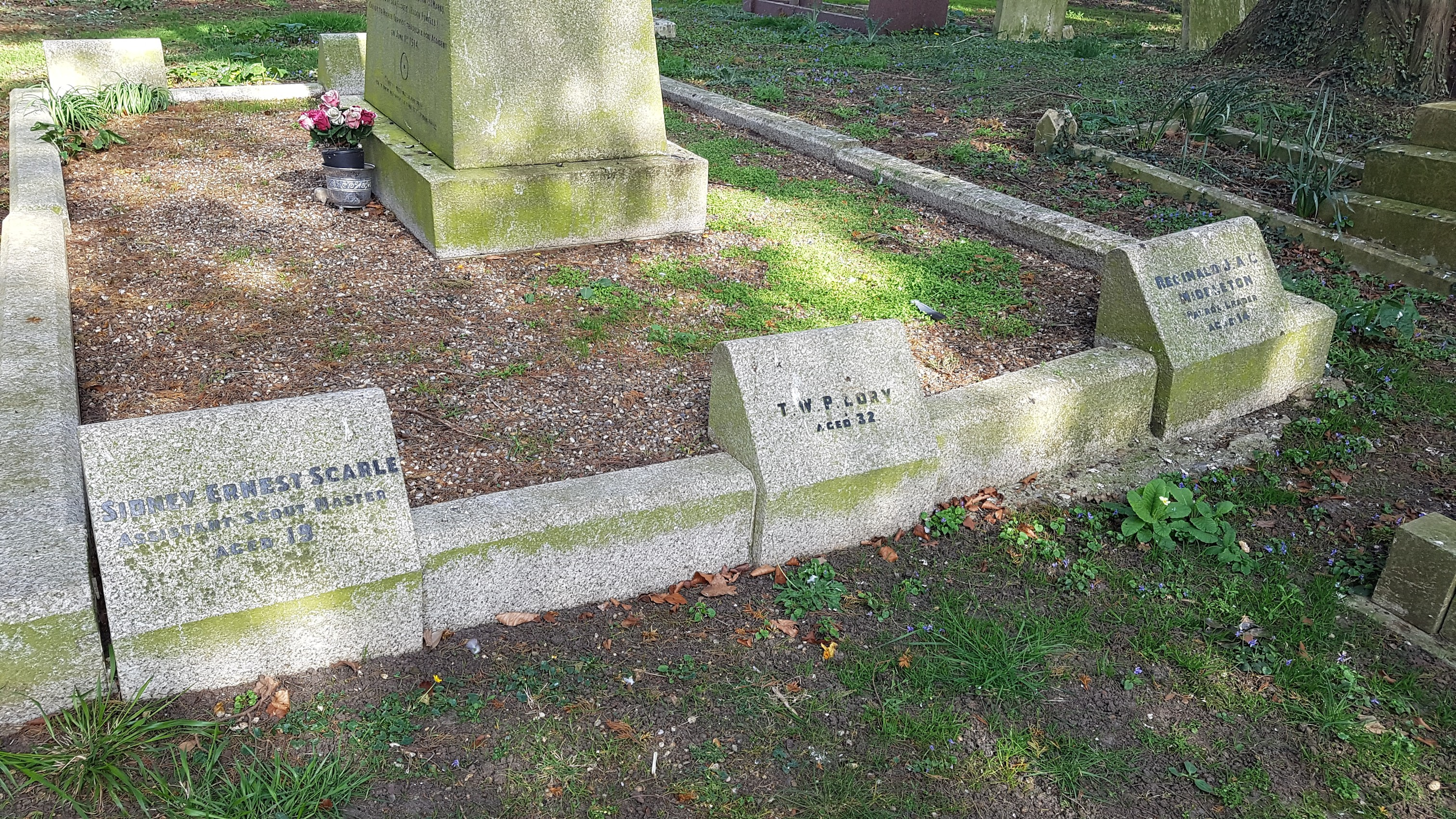
Headstones for those who drowned

The 1st Carlton (St Mark's) Sea Scouts Troop camped at nearby Somerleyton during the Whitsun week of 1914. The troop were led by Scoutmaster Thornton Lory (aged 34), Assistant Scoutmaster Sydney Searle (18) and Naval Instructor James Lewington (30). The scouts were Reginald Middleton (14), Arthur Beare (14), Sydney Thrower (16) and Stanley Wood (17). The party had travelled there along the River Waveney by sailing boat without event. The troop struck camp on the morning of 1 June 1914 and embarked on the boat for the return journey at 8:30 am.

Soon after departing, the party lowered the mast and sail of the boat to pass beneath the bridge carrying the Lowestoft–Norwich rail line across the river. Once they had rowed beneath the bridge, the group attempted to rehoist the sail. It was caught by a strong north-easterly wind, from behind the boat, which forced the front of the vessel under water and caused it to quickly capsize. Many of the occupants were trapped beneath the sail and all were drowned except Wood who managed to swim to one of the banks. Three holidaymakers on a nearby yacht attempted a rescue, assisted by people from the Duke's Head Hotel and a local doctor. The group recovered the bodies by 1 pm and took them to the hotel. The party were buried as a group, in a grave at the New Cemetery, Carlton Colville, following a service at St Mark's Church, with which the troop was associated. The funeral was attended by 300 Scouts from across East Anglia and some 200 wreaths were laid on the grave.

A coroner's inquest was held into the accident but Wood was too ill to attend. The inquest found that, apart from Lewington, all those aboard were "indifferent swimmers" and that the boat was overloaded and the weight unevenly distributed. It heard evidence from a witness that all the baggage was loaded at the front of the boat, making it front-heavy and that it was found with its boom stuck deep into the river bed. The inquest was told by another witness that the person in charge of the vessel should have foreseen the danger posed by the wind and moored before raising sail. The Boy Scouts Association's chief, Sir Robert Baden-Powell and its headquarters commissioner of Sea Scouts sent their condolences.

== Memorial ==
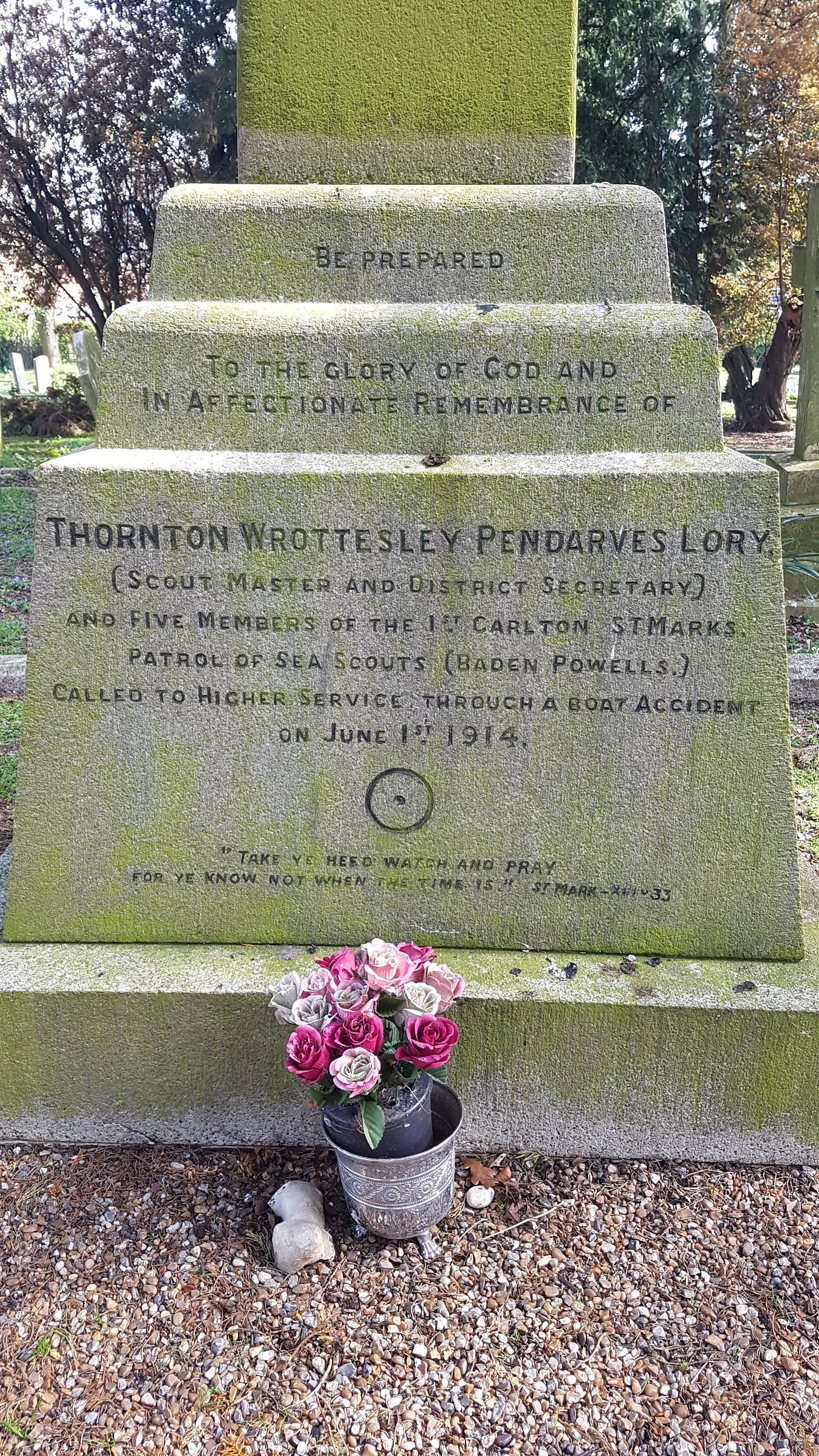
Inscription

A memorial monument, sculpted by James E Proudfoot, was erected above the grave. A square enclosure of granite kerb stones includes six small headstones with the names and ages of each person who died in the accident. At the centre stands a Celtic cross, measuring 14 feet (4.3 m) in height, 47 inches (1,200 mm) in width and 36 inches (910 mm) in thickness. The cross stands on a tapered plinth, the front face of which holds the inscription: BE PREPARED/ TO THE GLORY OF GOD AND/ IN AFFECTIONATE REMEMBRANCE OF/ THORNTON WROTTESLEY PENDARVES LORY,/ (SCOUT MASTER AND DISTRICT SECRETARY)/ AND FIVE MEMBERS OF THE 1ST CARLTON ST MARKS./ PATROL OF SEA SCOUTS (BADEN POWELLS.)/ CALLED TO HIGHER SERVICE THROUGH A BOAT ACCIDENT/ ON JUNE 1ST 1914./ "TAKE YE HEED WATCH AND PRAY/ FOR YE KNOW NOT WHEN THE TIME IS." ST MARK XIII V 33. "Be Prepared" is the Scout motto; the last two lines are the 33rd verse of the 13th chapter of the Gospel of Mark in the King James Bible. Between the date and quotation of the inscription is a circle with a dot in the centre, the Scout tracking symbol for "gone home", commonly used in Scout obituaries of the period.

== Death of Wood and later events ==
The sole survivor of the accident, Stanley Wood, joined the British Army during the First World War. He apparently originally joined the local Suffolk Regiment but was drafted into the Oxfordshire and Buckinghamshire Light Infantry alongside a number of other men from the Lowestoft and Oulton areas. Wood served in the 2nd/1st Buckinghamshire Battalion and was promoted to the rank of lance corporal. He was killed in action during the 19 July 1916 Attack at Fromelles, part of the Battle of the Somme. The battalion was struck by heavy German machine gun fire and 322 of 642 men were killed or wounded; Wood's body was never found. Wood's name was added to the rear of the plinth and the Carlton Colville Scouts Memorial was dedicated on 29 September 1918 by the Bishop of Norwich Bertram Pollock. The additional inscription reads "STANLEY WOOD/ PATROL LEADER/ SAVED TO SERVE/ DIED FOR ENGLAND/ AT THE BATTLE OF THE SOMME, JULY 1916/ AGED 19". Wood is also remembered on the Loos Memorial to the missing in France.

A ceremony to mark the centenary of the drownings was held at the memorial in 2014 and a new memorial plaque installed within the church. The Carlton Colville Scouts Memorial received statutory protection as a grade II listed building on 24 June 2016 as part of commemorations of the centenary of the start of the Battle of the Somme.
