= Bramfield, Hertfordshire =

Village in Hertfordshire, England

Coordinates: 51.8247°N 0.1267°W

Bramfield
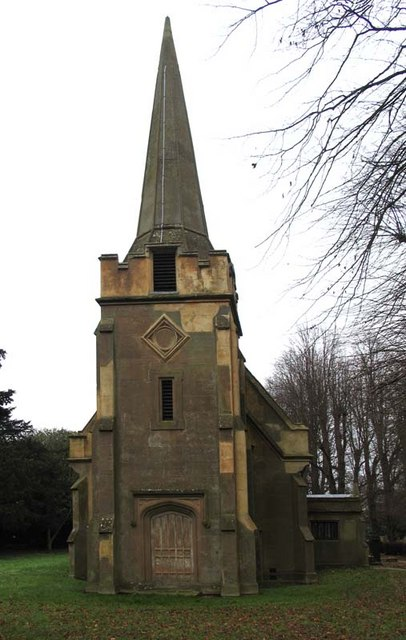
- St Andrew's Church, Bramfield

- Location within Hertfordshire
- Population: 257 (Parish, 2021)
- OS grid reference: TL292156
- Civil parish: Bramfield
- District: East Hertfordshire
- Shire county: Hertfordshire
- Region: East
- Country: England
- Sovereign state: United Kingdom
- Post town: HERTFORD
- Postcode district: SG14
- Dialling code: 01992
- Police: Hertfordshire
- Fire: Hertfordshire
- Ambulance: East of England
- UK Parliament: Hertford

Bramfield is a village and civil parish in the East Hertfordshire district of Hertfordshire, England. It lies 3 miles (5 km) north-west of Hertford, its post town. Other nearby villages include Waterford and Stapleford. At the 2021 census the parish had a population of 257.

Bramfield has a church dedicated to St Andrew.

== See also ==
- Sally Rainbow
