= Sprat's Water and Marshes, Carlton Colville =

Protected area in Suffolk, England

Coordinates: 52.47°N 1.69°E

- Site of Special Scientific Interest
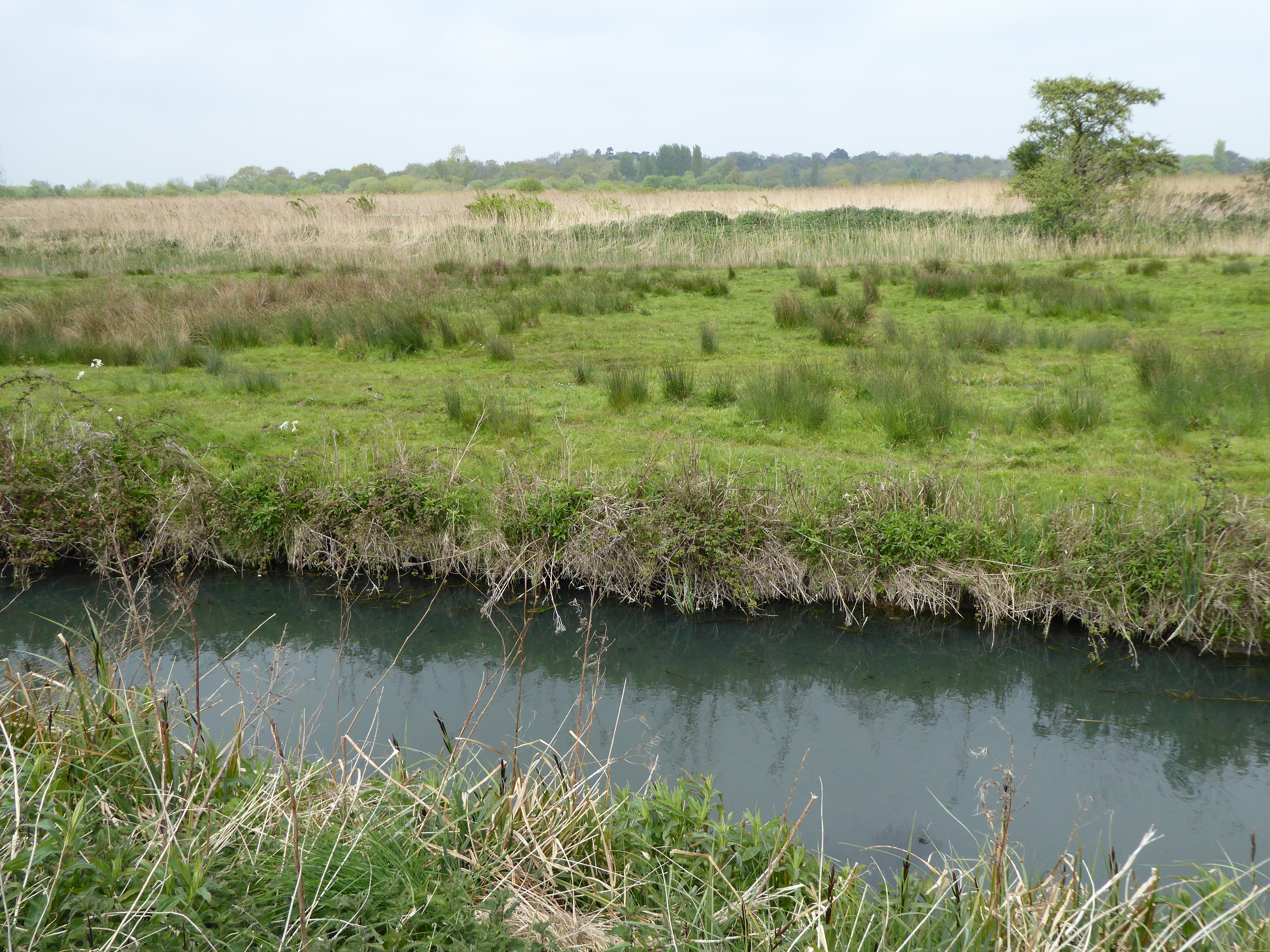
- Carlton Marshes
- Location of Sprat's Water and Marshes, Carlton Colville.
- Area of search: Suffolk
- Grid reference: TM 506 922
- Interest: Biological
- Area: 57.1 hectares
- Notification date: 1986
- Location map: Magic Map

Sprat's Water and Marshes, Carlton Colville is a 57.1-hectare (141-acre) biological Site of Special Scientific Interest on the western outskirts of Lowestoft in Suffolk, England. It is part of the Broadland Ramsar internationally important wetland site, and Special Protection Area under the European Union Directive on the Conservation of Wild Birds, and part of The Broads Special Area of Conservation. The northern part of the site is Carlton Marshes, which is part of Carlton and Oulton Marshes, a nature reserve managed by the Suffolk Wildlife Trust.

The site has open water, mixed fen, alder carr and wet grazing marsh on thick peat. The diverse flora include a number of uncommon species, and the site is also important for breeding birds.

The Angles Way footpath passes through the site, but some parts are closed to the public.
