= Carlton Colville =

Seaside town and civil parish in Suffolk, England

Coordinates: 52.454°N 1.691°E

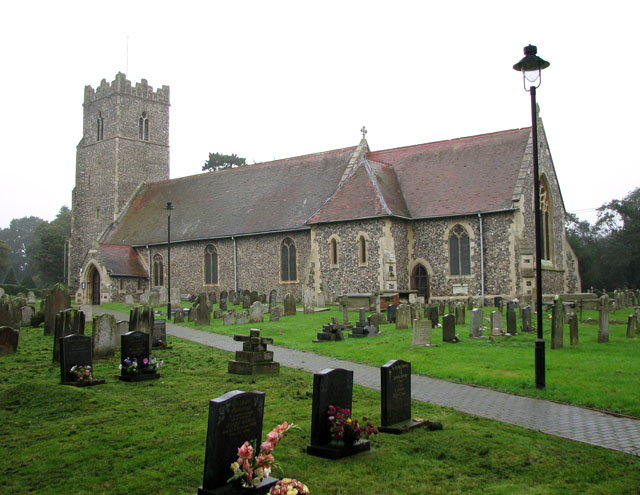
- St Peter's Church, Carlton Colville, seen from the southeast (September 2010)

- Location within Suffolk
- Area: 8 km^{2} (3.1 sq mi)
- Population: 8,505 (2011)
  - Density: 1,063/km^{2} (2,750/sq mi)
- OS grid reference: TM509905
- Civil parish: Carlton Colville
- District: East Suffolk
- Shire county: Suffolk
- Region: East
- Country: England
- Sovereign state: United Kingdom
- Post town: LOWESTOFT
- Postcode district: NR33
- Dialling code: 01502
- UK Parliament: Lowestoft

Carlton Colville is a seaside town and civil parish in the English county of Suffolk. It is 3 miles (5 km) south-west of the centre of the town of Lowestoft in the East Suffolk district. The area lies along the A146 Lowestoft to Beccles road.

Carlton Colville has boundaries with Oulton Broad, Gisleham and Pakefield. It forms the south-western edge of Lowestoft, with Mutford 2 miles (3 km) to the south-east. The electoral ward continues to the north to the River Waveney and had a population of 6,612 at the 2001 census, increasing to 8,505 at the 2011 census. A civil parish, the parish council adopted town council status in August 2011, retaining the same powers and funding.

== History ==
The name Carlton derives from the Old Norse karl meaning free peasant combined with the Old English tūn meaning settlement. 'Colville' was the surname of a medieval landowner.

Archaeological investigations have discovered evidence of settlement from the prehistoric to the medieval periods, including three large stone axe heads dating from the Neolithic or early Bronze Age discovered together in a pit.

Bloodmoor Hill, located between Carlton Colville and Pakefield, was the site of settlement in the 2nd and 3rd centuries and the 7th and 8th centuries. The Saxon period consisted of a relatively dense settlement as well as a cemetery which included at least one rich barrow burial. Artifacts were discovered in the cemetery in the 18th century and the site was the subject of archaeological investigations between 1998 and 2006.

At the Domesday survey Carlton Colville was known as Carletuna or Karletun. It had a population of 45 households and a tax value of 4½ geld and was part of the estate of Earl Hugh of Chester.

A moated site south of Carlton Colville is believed to be the site of a medieval manor and is a scheduled monument.

== Local ecology ==
Carlton Colville has for long been a location of ecological interest. William Dutt lived in the village for many years. He annotated a coy of Flora of Suffolk by Churchill Babington and W. M. Hind, (1889) with plants found by Mrs F. Baker. Many of them were introduced species particularly found between Morse's Malthouse and a yacht building yard. This was an area where corn grown in the Levant had previously been unloaded.

Carlton Colville lies to the south of the River Waveney consisting of area of marshland and reedbed. Part of the area is designated, as Sprat's Water and Marshes, as a Site of Special Scientific Interest 55.5 hectares (137 acres) in size. Much of this area forms part of Carlton and Oulton Marshes Nature Reserve, a 151 hectares (370 acres) site operated by Suffolk Wildlife Trust. These areas are part of The Broads system and are the site of rare water plants such as bladderwort and water soldier as well as dragonfly populations.

== Geography, culture and community ==
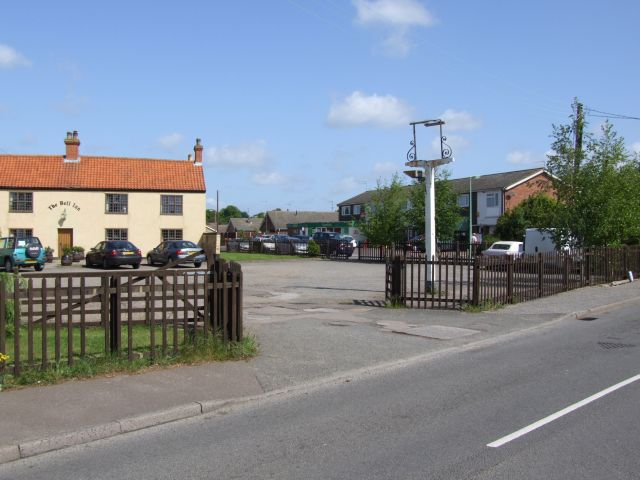
Bell Inn in Carlton Colville. Image author: Ian Robertson

Carlton Colville Primary School is the main primary school serving the surrounding area. The school was previously a lower school located on Church Lane, but due to a schools reorganisation by Suffolk County Council it was extended to a primary school and relocated to the site of the former Gisleham Middle School in September 2011 on Gisleham Road. Beccles Free School temporarily occupied the former site of Carlton Colville Primary School from September 2012, but relocated to Beccles in September 2014.

The parish church is St. Peter's Church, the oldest surviving part of which was built in the 13th century. There are six bells that hang at St Peter's weighing up to 12-1-26 cwt. The oldest bell was cast in 1608 by William Brend.

Carlton Colville is home to the East Anglia Transport Museum.

Carlton Colville Town FC have two teams, a first team and a development team, playing in the Forsters Solicitors Anglian Combination Football League and in the Lowestoft & District Football League respectively.

The New Cemetery holds the Carlton Colville Scouts Memorial to scouts who died in a 1914 boating accident and a survivor who was killed at the Battle of the Somme.
