= Mettingham College =

Monastic college in Suffolk, England

Coordinates: 52.4448°N 1.4714°E

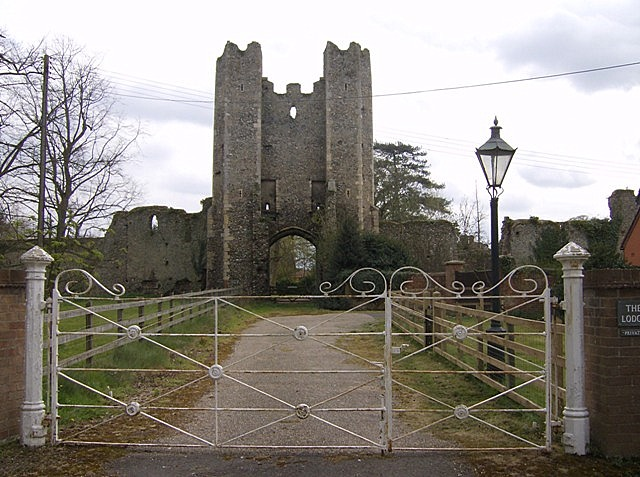
Entrance to Mettingham Castle

Mettingham College was a monastic college in the parish of Mettingham in the English county of Suffolk. The college was located within Mettingham Castle, although it was founded elsewhere.

== Foundation ==
The college was founded on 24 July 1350, originally as a chantry college for eight secular canons under a master at Raveningham in Norfolk. The founder was Sir John de Norwich, eldest son of Sir Walter de Norwich, Chief Baron of the Exchequer, whose sister Margaret married Robert de Ufford, the future 1st Earl of Suffolk, in 1324. The canons were to celebrate in the parish church of St Andrew, Raveningham, for the welfare of Sir John and his wife, the Blessed Virgin, St Andrew the Apostle, and All Saints. The college itself was dedicated to St Mary.

== History ==
When writing his will in 1373, another Sir John, grandson of the founder, was planning to move the college to Norton Subcourse, and left £450 for the building of a new church there. However this plan foundered. His cousin Katherine de Brews became his heir, and as her trustees Sir Roger de Boys, John Playz and others in 1382 paid a very large sum to license the removal of the college to Mettingham Castle. This was also frustrated owing to objections raised by the nuns of Bungay Priory, but the number of canons was increased to thirteen.

In 1387 an interim move was made to Norton Subcourse, but with the concession that the college should have all the original endowments at Raveningham as well as those of Mettingham when the move was eventually made there. It remained at Norton for seven years and finally arrived at Mettingham Castle in 1394, where the college remained until its surrender to the Crown in 1542.

A Register survived in the Stowe Library. The college records have a place in the history of drama in England and the College Library forms the basis of an important study of the ways in which books were acquired and produced. The British Library holds numerous charters relating to Mettingham College.

== The Russian Orthodox College ==
While in no way a re-creation of the original medieval chantry college, on 1 September 2012 the College of Our Lady of Mettingham was formally inaugurated under the auspices of the Russian Orthodox Church Outside Russia in the grounds of The White House in the north of the parish of Mettingham. The college is a unique institution which seeks to become an Orthodox pastoral, pilgrimage and education centre.
