= Mettingham =

Village in Suffolk, England

Coordinates: 52.457°N 1.474°E

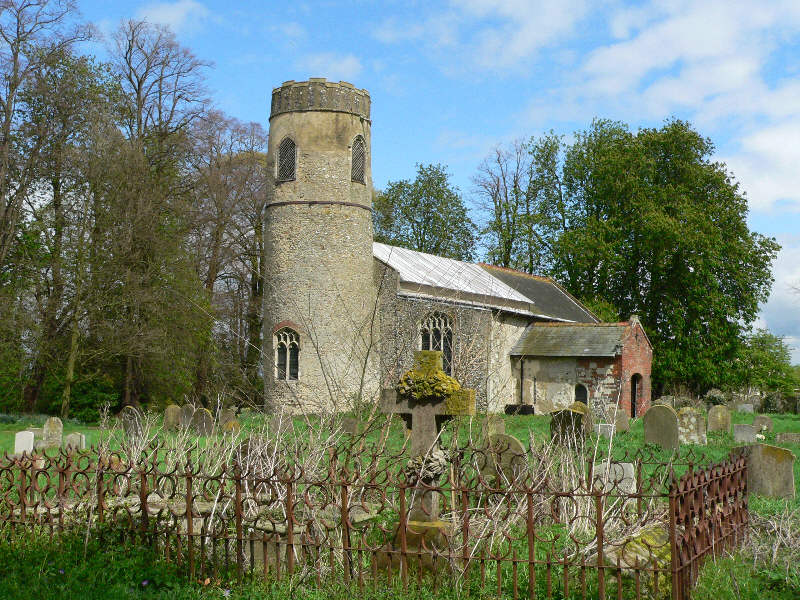
- All Saints' Church

- Location within Suffolk
- Area: 6 km^{2} (2.3 sq mi)
- Population: 211 (2011)
  - Density: 35/km^{2} (91/sq mi)
- OS grid reference: TM359900
- District: East Suffolk
- Shire county: Suffolk
- Region: East
- Country: England
- Sovereign state: United Kingdom
- Post town: Bungay
- Postcode district: NR35
- Dialling code: 01986
- UK Parliament: Waveney

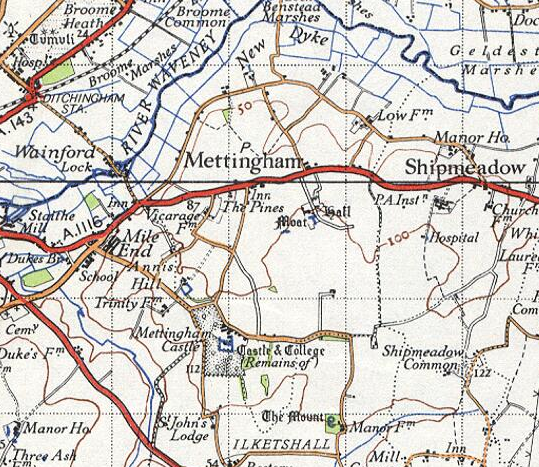
Ordnance Survey map of Mettingham in the 20th century

Mettingham is a village and civil parish in the north of the English county of Suffolk. It is 2 miles (3.2 km) east of the market town of Bungay in the East Suffolk district. It had a population of 211 at the 2011 United Kingdom census.

The northern boundary of the parish is formed by the River Waveney which marks the county boundary with Norfolk. The northern section of the parish is within the area of The Broads National Park. The parish borders the parishes of Bungay, Shipmeadow, Ilketshall St John and the Norfolk parishes of Broome and Ellingham. The B1062 Bungay to Beccles road runs through the centre of the parish.

In the 1870s, Mettingham was described as:

"a village and a parish in Wangford district, Suffolk. The village stands near the river Waveney, at the boundary with Norfolk, 2 miles E of Bungay r. station; is a scattered place; and has a postoffice under Bungay."

Its church, All Saints, is a round-tower church and about a mile to the south, Mettingham Castle comprises the ruins of a moated medieval fortified manor house, with a medieval monastic college, Mettingham College, in its grounds. The college was relocated to the site in 1394 and was dissolved in 1542 during the Dissolution of the Monasteries.

== All Saints Church ==
All Saints is one of around 40 round-tower churches in Suffolk. (Note: The exact number of round-tower churches in the county is a matter of debate. Some sources list 38, others cite between 40 and 43. They almost all date from the late Anglo-Saxon or early Norman periods and were mostly built between the 11th and 14th-centuries. There are around 183 round-tower churches in England, most of them in Norfolk, which has around 124, and Suffolk. Four of the churches now in Norfolk were previously in Suffolk before boundary changes in 1974.) It is a Grade I listed building which was restored in 1898. In 2012, the church was threatened with closure due to the theft of £16,000 worth of lead from its roof: there was insufficient money for repairs on top of daily running costs. The money was raised to replace the lead, but in October 2014, a further section of lead was taken. A cheaper material was used to fix the roof to avoid a recurrence.

== Transport ==
The B1062 road runs through the centre of the parish. Mettingham has very limited public transport with a daily bus service. The closest railway station is Beccles, 4 miles (6.4 km) to the east.
