= SET Beccles School =

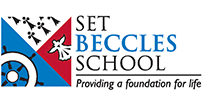
- SET Beccles School

Location
- Castle Hill; Beccles, Suffolk, NR34 7BQ; England; 52.451°N 1.573°E

Information
- Type: Free school
- Motto: Providing a Foundation for Life
- Established: 2012
- Trust: Seckford Education Trust UID:4482
- Department for Education URN: 138274 Tables
- Ofsted: Reports
- Headteacher: Heidi Philpott
- Gender: Coeducational
- Age: 11 to 16
- Enrolment: 296 As of November 2019
- Capacity: 600
- Website: becclesschool.org.uk

SET Beccles School (formerly Beccles Free School) is a coeducational secondary free school located in Beccles in the English county of Suffolk.

== History ==
The school opened in September 2012, the first free school to open in the Waveney district. The school was first located at the site of the former Carlton Colville Primary School in Carlton Colville. However, in 2014 it relocated to the former lower school site of Sir John Leman High School (formerly Beccles Middle School) in Beccles. The school is operated by the Seckford Education Trust, an educational charity based in Woodbridge. The headteacher is David Lees.

There was considerable opposition to the opening of Beccles Free School from local campaigners, head teachers and senior politicians, including the local Conservative Member of Parliament Peter Aldous. The school attracted further controversy when it was revealed that only 68 pupils had enrolled at the school when it opened in September 2012, leading to accusations that the school was a waste of taxpayers money. The school opened with 12 teachers employed and had attempted to attract pupils with offers of free uniforms, school meals and iPod Touch devices. By January 2013 an additional 34 pupils had joined the School, and in 2019 there were 296 in a building with the capacity for 600.

In 2013 the Advertising Standards Authority upheld two complaints about the way in which the school had misrepresented the former roles of its then head teacher, John Lucas, and the results of an Ofsted health and safety check. The school amended some literature as a result.

Following an inspection of the school in May 2014 pupil achievement, teaching and leadership were rated "good" by Ofsted, with behavior of pupils "outstanding". The overall report rated the school as "good". In May 2018 the a short inspection took place in which the school continued to be rated as "good".

== Academics ==
This is a free school, not constrained by the National Curriculum; the Trust board choose to run a longer day 30 teaching hour week. They choose a broad, balanced, traditional curriculum, which includes enrichment. As in a traditional state academy, they divide the students into a 3-year Key Stage 3, and 2-year Key Stage 4. Key Stage 4 is GCSE-oriented for years 10 and 11. There are no options as such, except a choice between Art, Drama, Music, Food or Resistant Materials. The trust believes that traditional GCSE studies provide the students with the range of skills necessary for them to progress to further studies and the life beyond.

=== Enrichment ===
Every Wednesday all students take part in a whole range of sporting, art, and drama activities, work experience or an extra GCSE. There is a Combined Cadet Force and the school runs Duke of Edinburgh Award activities. Enrichment activities are part of the school day, and off-timetable days each term. Enrichment is compulsory, but there are also opt-in clubs before during and after school.

== Academic performance ==
In August 2015 the school received its first set of GCSE results. Just 39% of pupils achieved the government benchmark 5 A*-C grades including English and Maths. These results were below the government "floor" standard for schools and resulted in an external enquiry being launched by the Seckford Foundation. The school described itself as "disappointed" by the results which compared with 67% of pupils achieving the same results at the Sir John Leman High School, the main competitor for Beccles Free School.

The 2016 GCSE results were again below the national average, with a Progress 8 score of −0.37. 47% of pupils earned grades A*-C in GCSE English and Maths.

The 2017 GCSE results showed improvement and were above the national average, with a Progress 8 score of 0.44, eighth best in Suffolk out of 43 mainstream secondary schools. 64% of pupils achieved Grade 4 or above (equivalent to Grade C) in English and Maths.

In 2018 the school received its highest GCSE results, with 67% of pupils achieving at least Grade 4 in English and Maths.
