= Sally Rainbow =

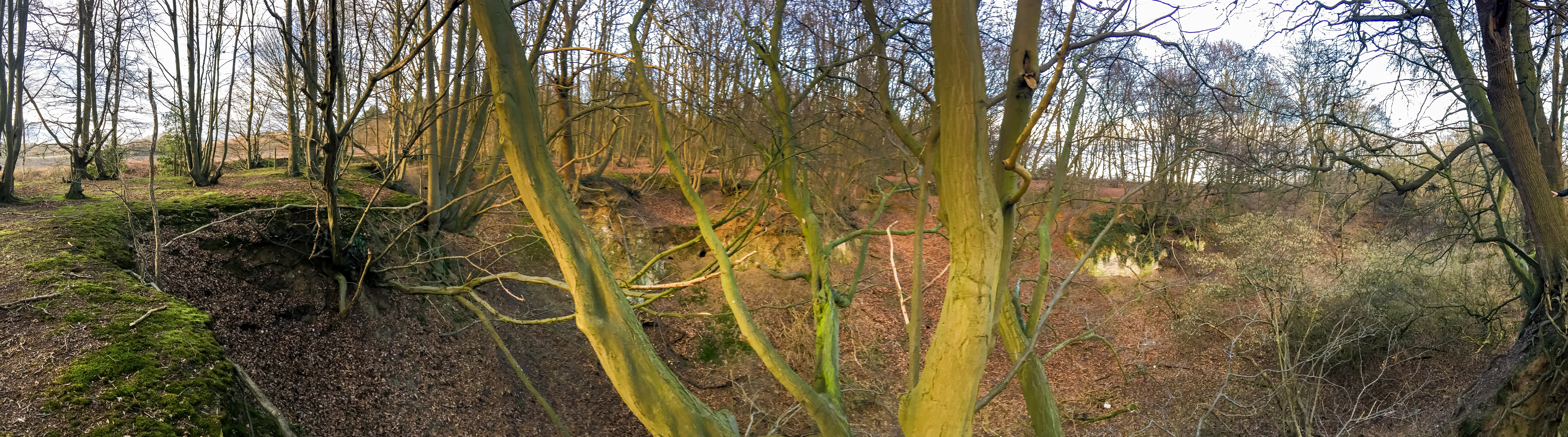
Sally Rainbow's Dell

Sally Rainbow (18th century) was an English woman, alleged to be a witch, who lived near the village of Bramfield, in Hertfordshire.

She was feared by the local population, being fed and placated by local farmers who feared her casting spells to ruin their crops. She made her home in a copse which has subsequently become known as Sally Rainbow's Dell. (grid reference TL 29156 16348). The dell was avoided by everyone in the area, which made it an ideal place for the highwayman Dick Turpin to hide after robbing the coaches travelling along the roads to and from London.
