= Shipmeadow =

Village in Suffolk, England

Coordinates: 52.456°N 1.505°E

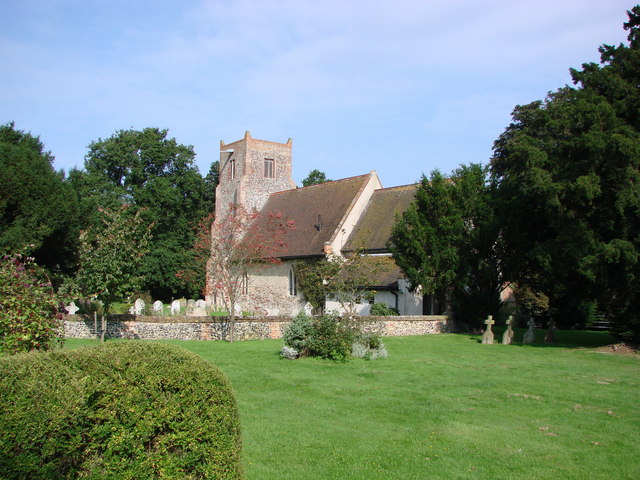
- The former St Bartholomew's church

- Location within Suffolk
- Area: 3 km^{2} (1.2 sq mi)
- Population: 140 (2011)
  - Density: 47/km^{2} (120/sq mi)
- OS grid reference: TM382900
- District: East Suffolk
- Shire county: Suffolk
- Region: East
- Country: England
- Sovereign state: United Kingdom
- Post town: Beccles
- Postcode district: NR34
- Dialling code: 01502
- UK Parliament: Waveney

Shipmeadow is a village and civil parish located in the north of the English county of Suffolk. It is in the East Suffolk district, 2.5 miles (4.0 km) east of Bungay and the same distance west of Beccles on the B1062 road. Norwich is 15 miles (24 km) to the north-west.

At the 2011 United Kingdom census the parish had a population of 140. The parish council operates jointly with Barsham. The parishes share a village hall, but Shipmeadow has no services, with the parish church being sold for use as private housing in 1980.

The River Waveney runs to the north of the parish, with the northern section of the parish within the area of The Broads National Park. The parish borders the parishes of Mettingham, Barsham, Ilketshall St John and Ilketshall St Andrew. The Norfolk parishes of Ellingham and Geldeston border the parish on the northern bank of the Waveney.

== History ==
Shipmeadow is recorded in the Domesday Book of 1086 as Scitmetdua or Scipmedu. It was located in Wangford Hundred. This settlement appears on John Speed's 1610 map as Shepemeadow. This shows that the name has more likely to be sheep meadow rather than the current Shipmeadow.

In the 1870s, John Marius Wilson made the following notes about Shipmeadow:

'Shipmeadow, a parish, with a village, in Wangford district, Suffolk; 2½ miles W by S of Beccles r. station. It has a post-office under Beccles. The church was repaired in 1856. The Wangford workhouse is here, has accommodation for about 400 inmates.'

The workhouse remains, but has since been converted to residential use.

== Transport ==
The B1062 road runs through Shipmeadow, linking it to Beccles to the east and Bungay to the west. The A143 and A146 run to the north of the parish and provide routes to Norwich, Great Yarmouth and Lowestoft. The nearest railway station is at Beccles 2.5 miles (4.0 km) to the east. The operations of NEBOair, an electric aviation company, are based in Shipmeadow Airfield.In its early days, the company considered flying passengers to Damyns Hall Aerodrome near Upminster in East London and Wickenby Aerodrome in Lincolnshire using Pipistrel electrically powered light aircraft.
