= A144 road =

Road in Suffolk, England

Coordinates: 52.393°N 1.499°E

A144

Route information
- Length: 14.4 mi (23.2 km)

Major junctions
- North end: Bungay (A143)
- A143; B1062; B1123 east to Blythburgh; B1123 west to Harleston; B1117 to Stradbroke; A12
- South end: A12

Location
- Country: United Kingdom
- Constituent country: England

Road network
- Roads in the United Kingdom; Motorways; A and B road zones

The A144 is an A road in the English county of Suffolk. It runs from the town of Bungay, close to the border with Norfolk, to the A12 trunk road near the village of Darsham, passing through the market town of Halesworth. It is around 14 miles (23 km) in length and is single carriageway throughout.

== History ==
The A144 was first numbered in 1923 and originally ran from the outskirts of Norwich, through Bungay and Halesworth to the A12 at Darsham. The section north of Bungay was reclassified as the B1332 in the 1960s, reducing the length of the A144 by half.

Prior to the building of the Bungay northern bypass in the 1980s the road started in central Bungay at the Buttercross market place. The bypass was completed in 1983, re-routing the A143 around the northern edge of the town on the former Waveney Valley railway line which had closed to traffic in 1966. This led to the extension of the A144 as far as the bypass. The A143 had previously run through Bungay.

== Route description ==
The A144 runs through the towns of Bungay and Halesworth in a generally north–south direction. It generally runs through rural areas along its route.

=== Bungay section ===
The A144 has its northernmost point at the roundabout with the A143 on the northern edge of Bungay near the Clays printing factory. It passes through the centre of the town, becoming part of the Bungay one way system established on a permanent basis in 2014. This splits the road in places before it is reunited at the southern edge of the town centre having passed the grade I listed St Mary's Church. The road then passes Bungay Pool and Gym on the southern edge of the town before entering a rural section.

=== Bungay to Halesworth ===
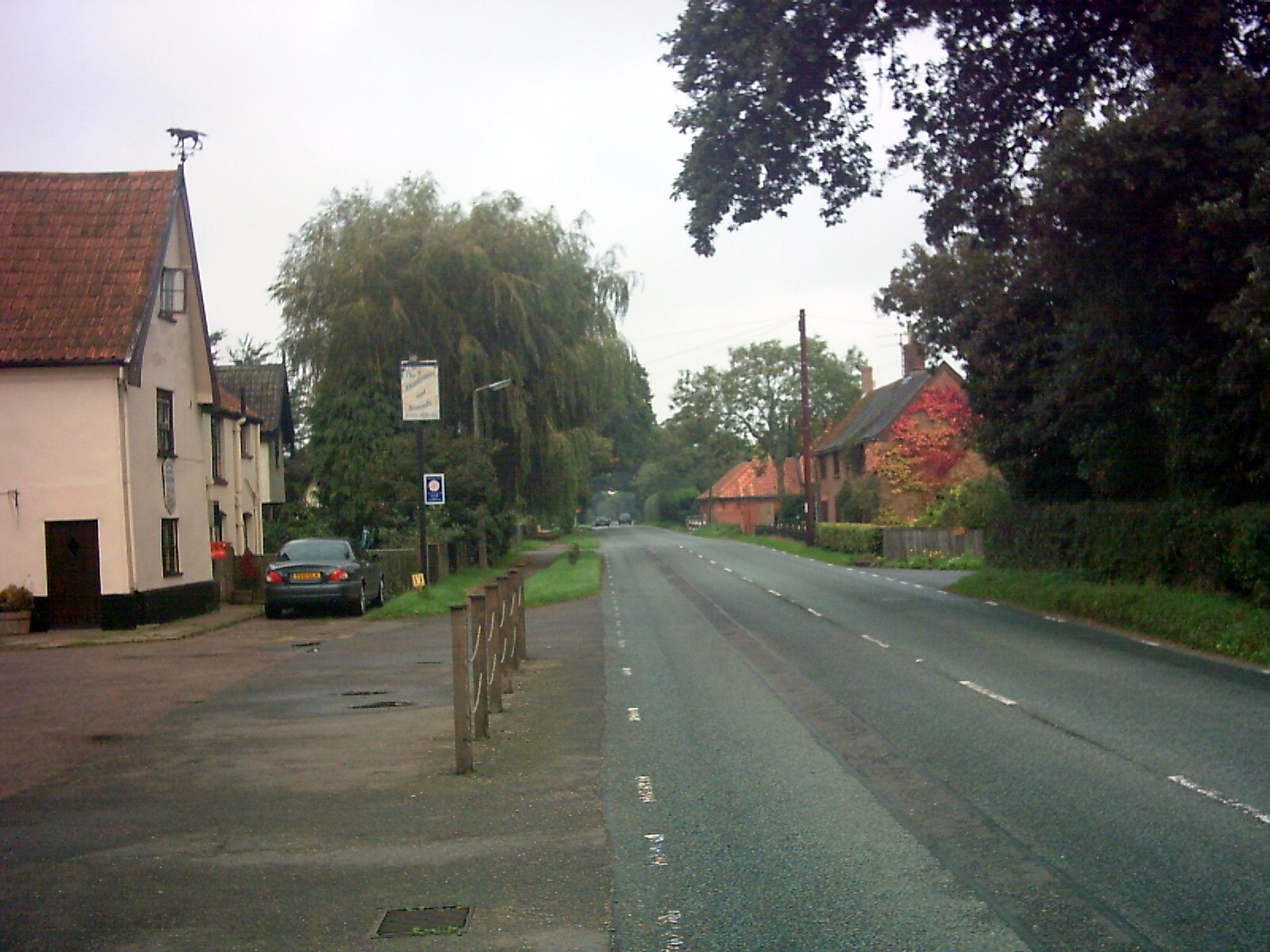
The A144 at Stone Street, Spexhall

South of Bungay the A144 runs through the parishes of St John, Ilketshall and St Lawrence, Ilketshall, passing close to both parish churches. Between St Lawrence and Halesworth it follows the route of the Roman Stone Street for around 5.5 miles (8.9 km). Throughout this section the road is subject to a number of speed restrictions to slow traffic through villages and improve road safety. In Spexhall parish it crosses the Lowestoft to Ipswich railway before arriving at the northern edge of Halesworth.

The road crosses the railway again near Halesworth railway station before bypassing the town centre to the east. The bypass was built in the late 1980s and leaves the town centre mainly pedestrianised. The B1123 from the east meets the A144 at the northern edge of the town centre, linking Halesworth to the A145 at Blythburgh. South of the town centre the westward section of the B1123 towards Metfield and Harleston joins the road, before the junction with the B1117 towards Laxfield and Stradbroke is reached.

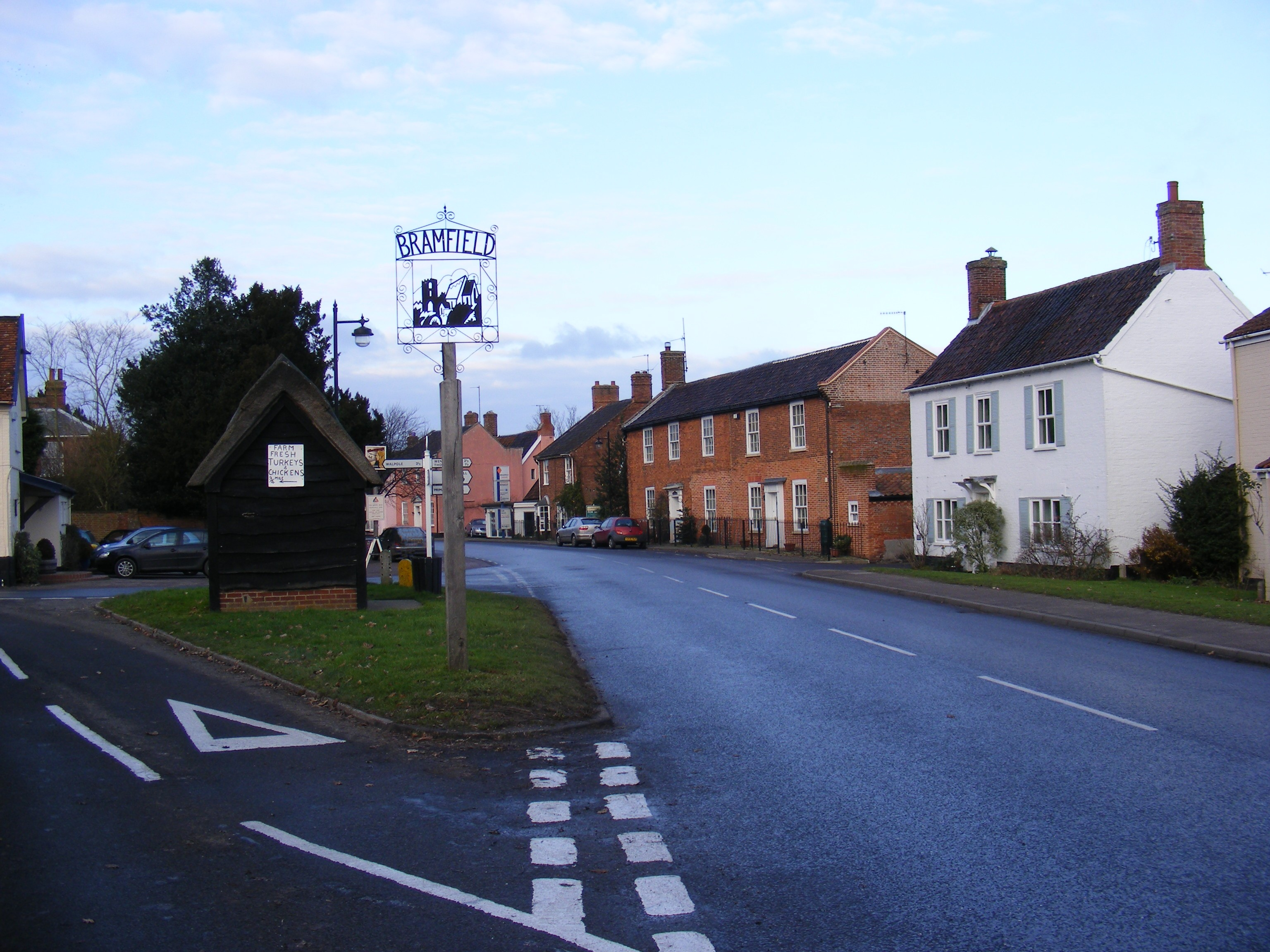
The A144 at Bramfield

=== Halesworth to the A12 ===
The road then re-enters a rural section, crossing the River Blyth before crossing the railway for a third time at a level crossing adjacent to Halesworth Golf Club. The A144 then runs through the centre of the village of Bramfield before reaching the A12 main trunk road between Great Yarmouth and London to the north of the village of Darsham.

== Road Safety ==
The A144 is generally straight and has no record of significant safety issues. It has generally been rated as medium or low–medium risk in European Road Assessment Programme (EuroRAP) surveys. There were nine fatalities associated with road traffic accidents along its length between 1999 and 2010.

Congestion in Bungay has caused some safety problems on the A144 and a one-way system was established in the town in 2014, the town having been bypassed to the north for east–west traffic in the 1980s. The road is limited to 30 miles per hour in Bungay and Halesworth as well as through some village areas. Some 40 mph and 50 mph restrictions are also in place either side of slower speed areas. Suffolk Constabulary operate mobile speed cameras on the road to enforce speed limits. On-road cycle lanes, footpaths and pedestrian crossings are used within built up areas to support road safety, as do roundabouts at the northern junction of the road with the A143 and in Halesworth.
