= Ilketshall St Lawrence =

Village in Suffolk, England

Coordinates: 52.401°N 1.496°E

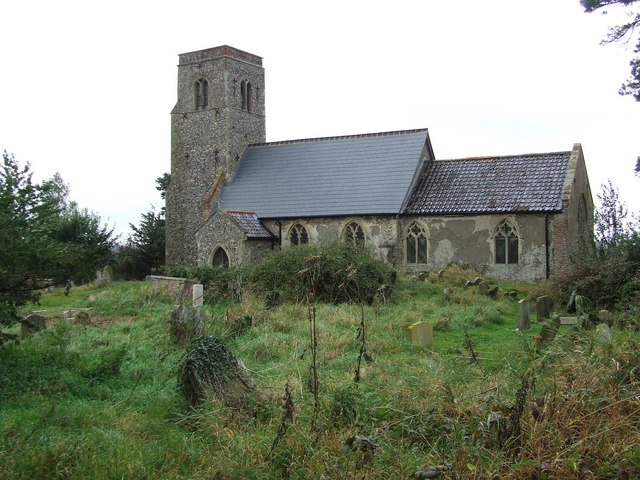

- Location within Suffolk
- Area: 5 km^{2} (1.9 sq mi)
- Population: 158 (2011)
  - Density: 32/km^{2} (83/sq mi)
- OS grid reference: TM379838
- District: East Suffolk
- Shire county: Suffolk
- Region: East
- Country: England
- Sovereign state: United Kingdom
- Post town: Beccles
- Postcode district: NR34
- Dialling code: 01986
- UK Parliament: Waveney

Ilketshall St Lawrence is a village and civil parish in the East Suffolk district of the English county of Suffolk. It is 3 miles (4.8 km) south-east of the market town of Bungay and is part of a group of parishes with similar names known collectively as the Saints.

The parish is spread along a 3 miles (4.8 km) stretch of the A144 road which runs between Bungay and Halesworth. It has an elongated shape, with the parish church located close to the northern border of the parish and the village school, Ilketshall St Lawrence primary school, located close to the southern border. At the 2011 United Kingdom census the parish had a population of 158. It has an area of 5 square kilometres (1.9 mi^{2}) and borders the parishes of Ilketshall St Andrew, Ilketshall St John, Ilketshall St Margaret and Spexhall.

Other than the school and the parish church, there are few services in the village. A garage and petrol station are located on the main road and an apple juice and cider making business operates from the parish. A public house, the Huntsman and Hounds, lies just south of the parish boundary in the hamlet of Stone Street, part of Spexhall parish.

The parish church, which is dedicated to St Lawrence, dates from the 12th-century, although there was a church on the site at the time of the Domesday Book. The tower dates from the 15th-century. The church is a Grade II* listed building and is believed to be built on a Roman site, with pottery found in the grounds in 1929.
