= Queen's Head, Bramfield =

Pub in Bramfield, Suffolk, England

Coordinates: 52.3098°N 1.5192°E

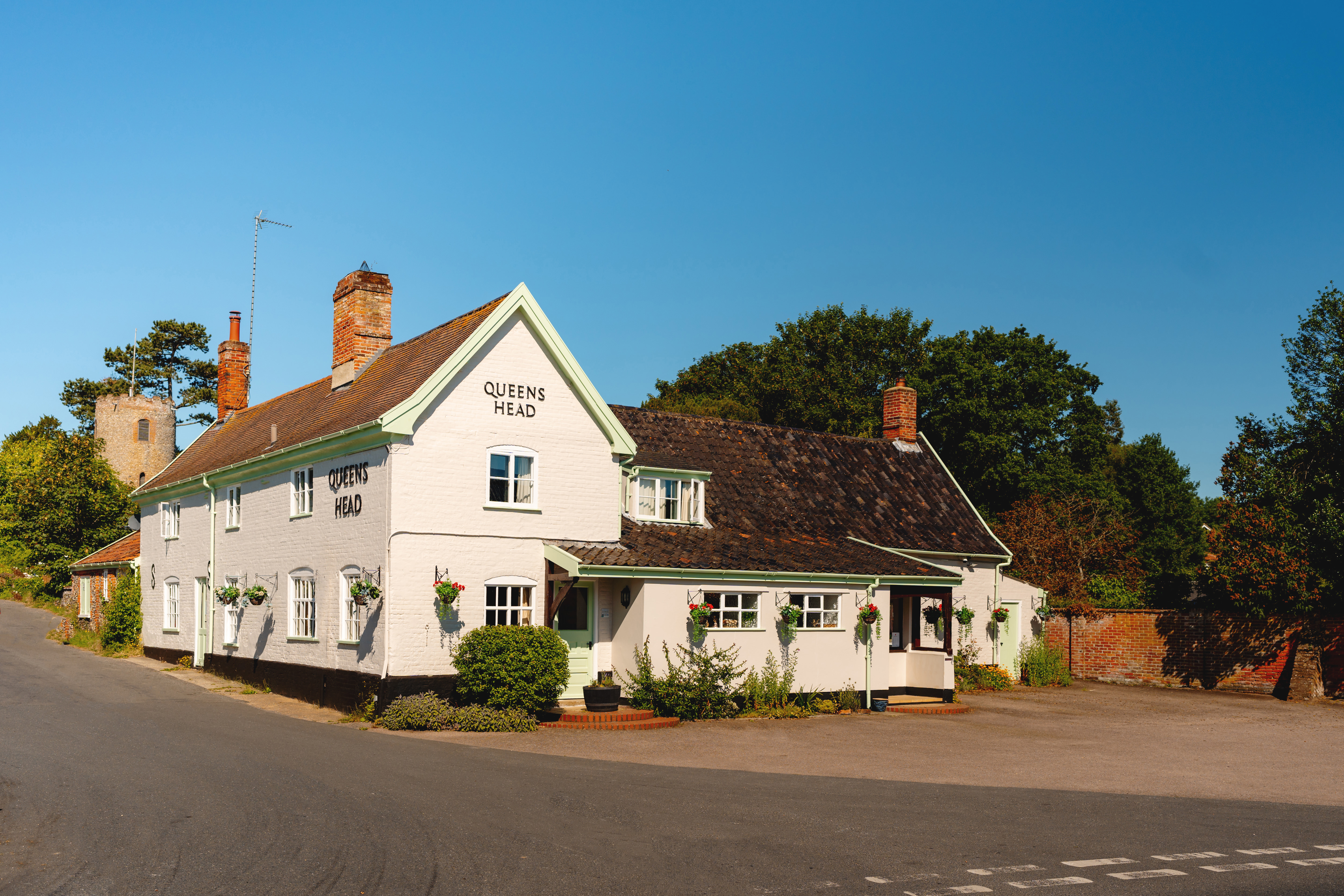

The Queen's Head is a pub in Bramfield, Suffolk, England. The pub was formerly known as the "Skeltons". It is a Grade II listed building, which dates back in part to the 1540s.

The pub has received recognition for its food. It won The Good Food Guide pub of the year twice in a row and was in The Good Pub Guide, The Good Food Guide, AA Pub Guide and Michelin Guide to Eating Out in Pubs in 2008. After 30 years of ownership, the pub was sold in late 2015 by Adnams PLC to property developers, Barsham Securities Limited, who refurbished the building and modernised the kitchen before leasing to a new tenant.

The pub was taken over in 2018 by the Wood family. It won the Muddy Stilettos Award 2024 for 'Best Destination Pub in Suffolk & Cambridgeshire', was voted 'Best Pub in Suffolk' by holidaycottages.co.uk in 2025 and is also featured in the 2025 and 2026 CAMRA Good Beer Guides.

The pub has a chosen charity, The Pear Tree Fund in Halesworth. To date, the pub has raised just over £22,000 for the charity.
