= Bramfield, Suffolk =

Village in Suffolk, England

Coordinates: 52.310°N 1.518°E

Bramfield
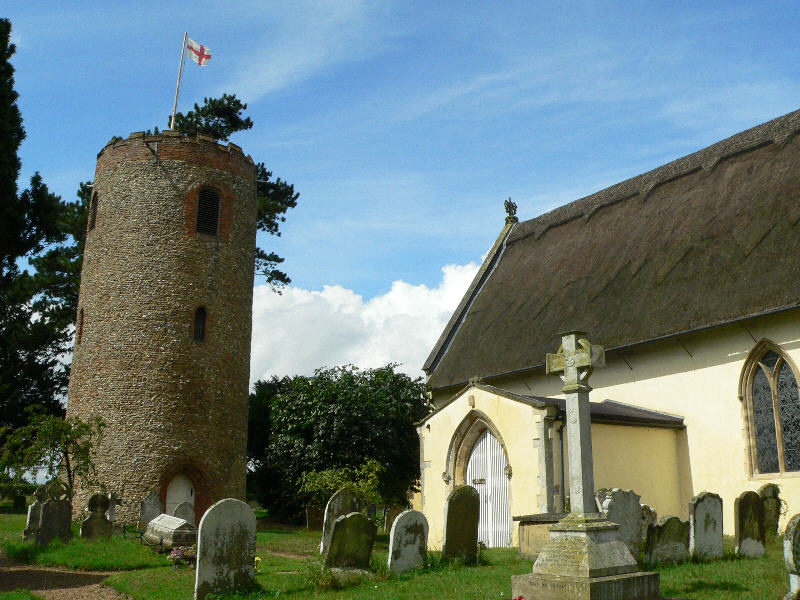
- St Andrew's Church, Bramfield, with its detached round tower at left

- Location within Suffolk
- Interactive map of Bramfield
- Population: 487 (2011)
- Shire county: Suffolk
- Region: East
- Country: England
- Sovereign state: United Kingdom
- Post town: Halesworth
- Postcode district: IP19

Bramfield is a village and civil parish in the east of the English county of Suffolk, and in the East Suffolk district. It is 5 miles (8.0 km) south of the market town of Halesworth on the A144 road between Halesworth and the A12 road, one of the main arterial routes through the county. The village is 24 miles (39 km) north-east of the county town of Ipswich and 15 miles (24 km) south-west of the port of Lowestoft. The East Suffolk railway line between Lowestoft and Ipswich passes close to the west of the village with Halesworth railway station being the nearest station.

== History ==
The village grew up as a crossroads location near the source of a tributary of the River Blyth. It is mentioned in the Domesday Book of 1086 as Bufelda, a large village of 42 households held by Count Alan of Brittany. In the medieval period a main route between the port of Dunwich and Bury St Edmunds crossed the modern day A144 road in the centre of the village. The village retains its basic cross plan, having developed around the crossroads.

Some Bronze Age and Iron Age archaeological sites have been identified close to the village and a number of medieval sites have been identified, including a scheduled ringwork 83 metres (272 ft) in diameter known as Castle Yard south-east of the village. A market was held in the village until the 16th century. The economy has always been based around agriculture, including the linen industry which developed in the Waveney valley area to the north. Malting and milling were important economically from the 18th century. The village had two windmills, with post mills, which were demolished in 1904 and 1944.

== Geography ==
The village lies near the source of a tributary of the River Blyth and the main street is situated along the river valley. An area of sandlings is found in the east of the parish, with the village itself on the eastern edge of the "High Suffolk" clay plateau.

== Culture and community ==
Most of the village has been designated as a conservation area by East Suffolk District Council since 1987. Local services include Bramfield Primary School, a pub, village hall, garage and butchers. Local services have declined since the 1980s. As well as the parish church, the village has a United Reformed chapel, built in 1841, with its own graveyard. A small village green survives in the centre of the village outside the pub, The Queen's Head. The pub includes buildings dating from the 16th century and is a Grade II listed building.

Bramfield House School is 1 mile (1.6 km) west of the village on the road to Walpole. It is a residential school catering for boys aged 7 to 18 with special educational needs.

Nationally renowned poet Roger Langley lived in the village following his retirement as a teacher and much of his work was inspired by the countryside around Bramfield and carvings in the village church. Langley was posthumously awarded the 2011 Forward Prize for Best Single Poem, for "To a Nightingale".

== Landmarks ==
There are a number of listed buildings in Bramfield.

=== St Andrew's Church ===
The 14th-century parish church with its 12th-century detached round tower, is dedicated to St Andrew. It is the only example of a detached round tower church in Suffolk. Both the church and its tower are Grade I listed buildings.

=== Bramfield Hall ===
Bramfield Hall dates from the 16th century but was substantially altered and extended in the 18th century. Built of red brick in three storeys to an H-shaped floorplan, it has a symmetrical 9-bay late 18th-century frontage with projecting wings. The boundary wall of the estate is a crinkle crankle wall built in a wavy line for extra stability. The hall itself is a Grade II* listed building.

The hall was the home of the Rabett family for several centuries. It was later the home of Gladwyn Jebb, the 1st Baron Gladwyn of Bramfield, who was the acting Secretary-General of the United Nations on its formation in 1945 and is buried in the village at St Andrew's church.

== Notable people ==
- Thomas Higham (1795–1844), antiquary and topographical engraver
