= NEBOair =

Aviation company

- Founded: 2021
- Headquarters: Shipmeadow, Suffolk, UK
- Area served: UK
- Key people: Sergey Grachev
- Website: neboair.co.uk

NEBOair is a United Kingdom civil aviation company that operates a fleet of electric aircraft, the Pipistrel Velis Electro.

== History ==
NEBOair was founded in 2021 and headquartered in Shipmeadow, Suffolk. It operates a fleet of Pipistrel Velis Electro. The company focuses on pilot training and short-haul regional flights.
