= St Andrew's Church, Bramfield =

Church in Suffolk, England

Coordinates: 52.3098°N 1.5179°E

St Andrew's
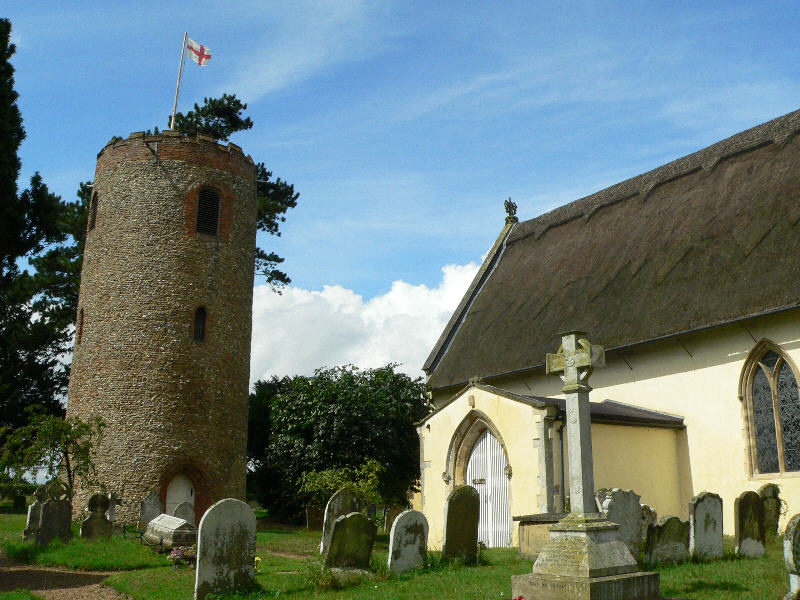
- St Andrew's

St Andrew's Church is a 13th-century church in Bramfield, Suffolk. It has a separate 12th-century tower standing in the church grounds. It is one of 38 existing round-tower churches in Suffolk and the only detached example in the county. The ground before the altar of the church is paved with a number of fine ledger slabs of members of the Rabett and Nelson families.

Both the church and the tower are Grade I listed buildings.

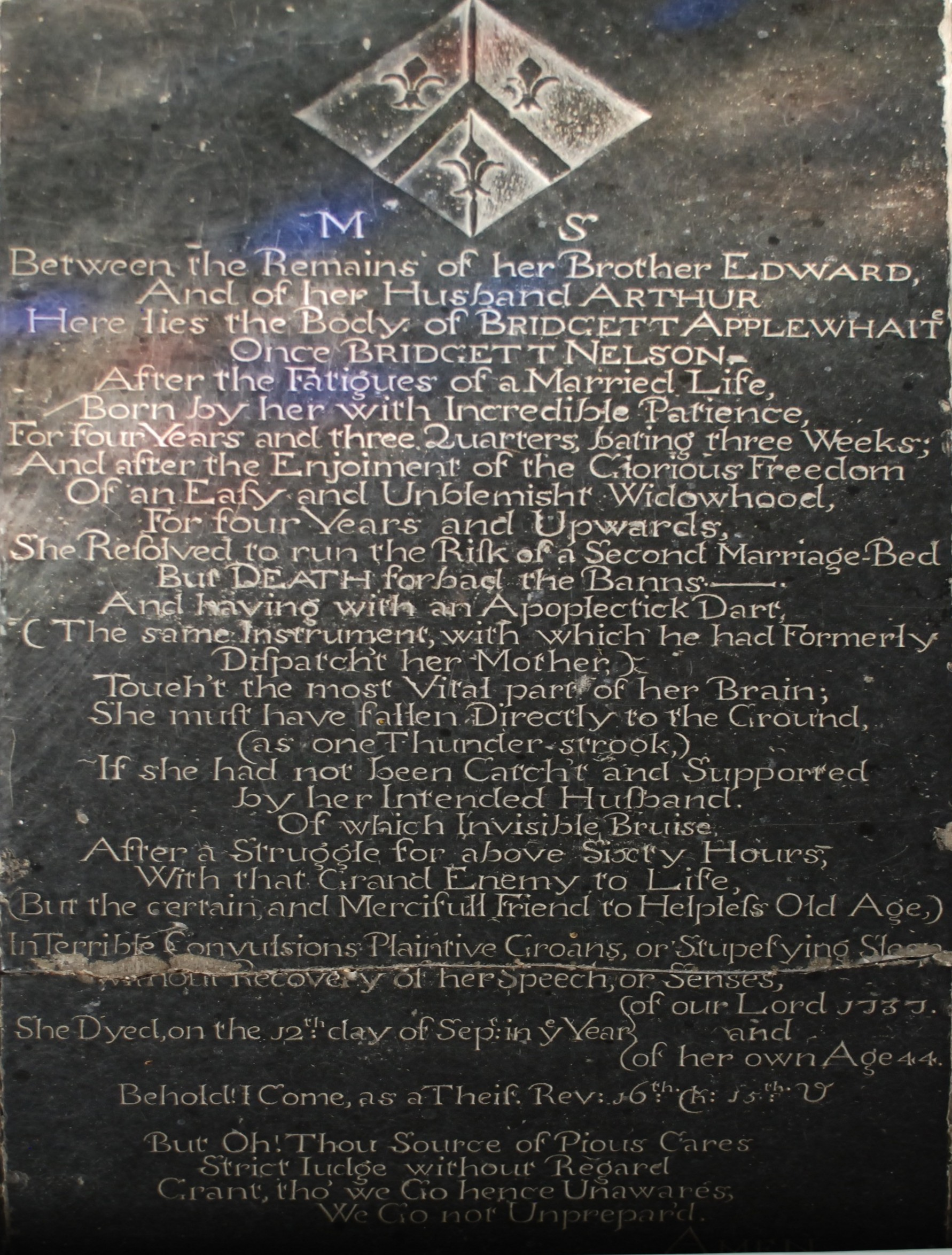
Ledger slab of Bridgett Applewhait
