= St Peter's Church, Carlton Colville =

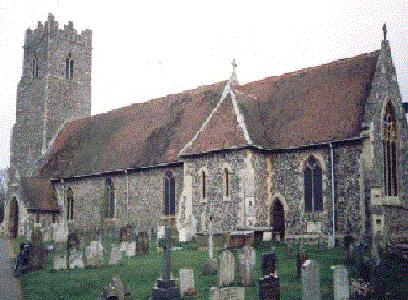
- St Peter's Church, Carlton Colville
- St Peter's Church, Carlton Colville
- 52°27′5.51″N 1°41′33.32″E
- OS grid reference: TM 51000 90143
- Location: Carlton Colville
- Country: England
- Denomination: Church of England

History
- Dedication: St Peter

Architecture
- Heritage designation: Grade II* listed

Administration
- Diocese: Anglican Diocese of Norwich
- Archdeaconry: Norfolk
- Deanery: Lothingland
- Parish: Carlton Colville

St. Peter's Church is the Anglican parish church in the village of Carlton Colville, near Lowestoft in Suffolk, England. It is a small church with 13th-century origins, the oldest recorded building in the village. The structure is Grade II* listed building.

The church as it stands today is largely Victorian however, rebuilt in the style of a medieval church in the 1880s – the church had a wealthy rector, who had the church almost completely rebuilt at his own expense. The tower is original 13th century, restored rather than replaced, but the rest is mainly 19th century work. But several of the old windows were reused, and it is still a fine building, and a popular venue for weddings.

The parish is part of the Carlton Colville and Mutford benefice, within the Diocese of Norwich. It now serves the housing estates around the area, as well as the old village itself.
