= A143 road =

Road in England

Coordinates: 52.34482°N 1.03441°E

A143

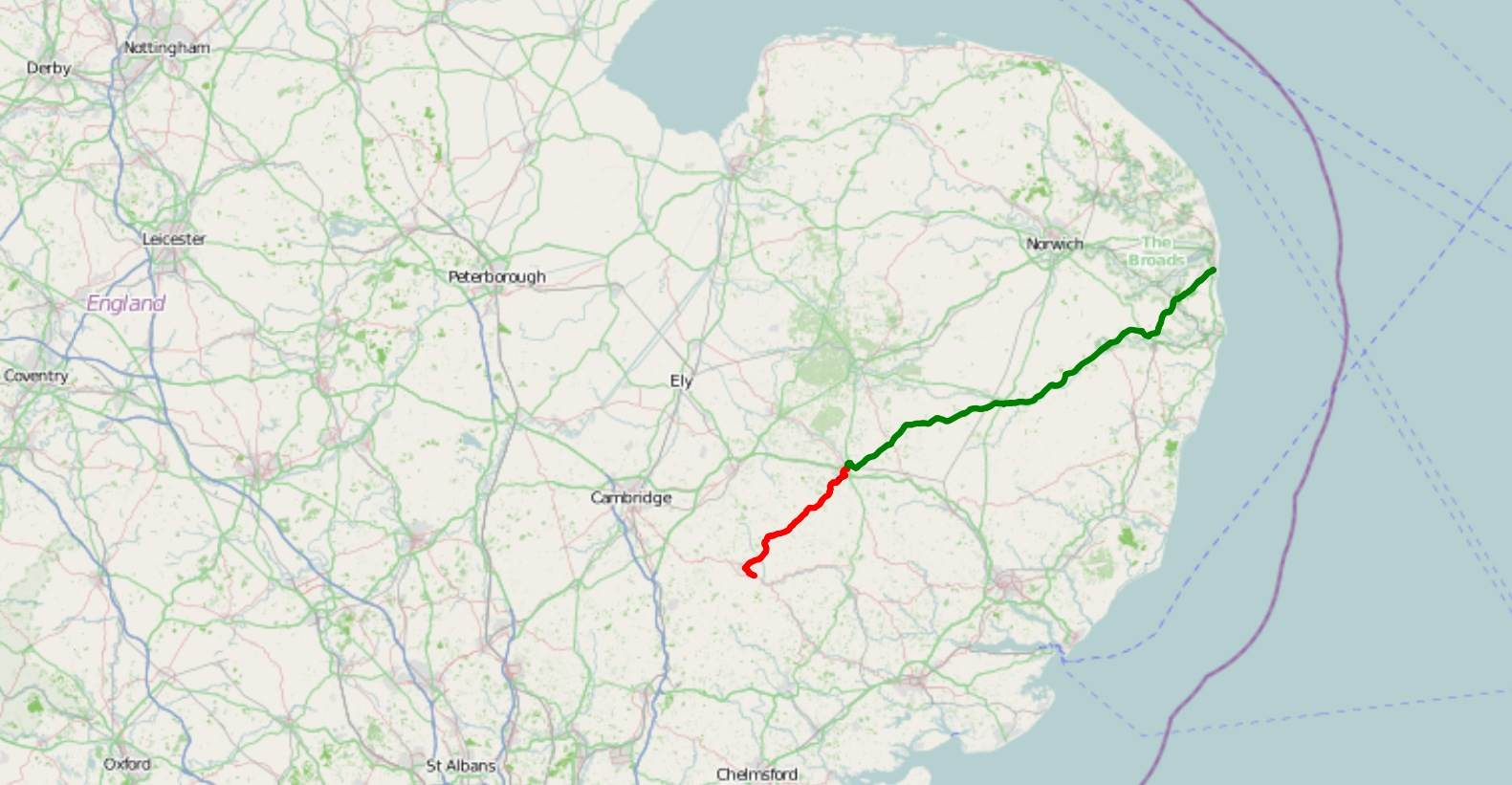
- Click map to enlarge

Route information
- Length: 74.7 mi (120.2 km)

Major junctions
- North-East end: Gorleston-on-Sea area of Great Yarmouth
- A47; A14 A134 A140 A144 A146 A1088 A1307
- South-West end: Haverhill

Location
- Country: United Kingdom
- Primary destinations: Diss; Bury St Edmunds

Road network
- Roads in the United Kingdom; Motorways; A and B road zones

The A143 is a road that runs from the Gorleston-on-Sea area of Great Yarmouth, in Norfolk to Haverhill in Suffolk.

For much of the route (between Gorleston-on-Sea and Bury St Edmunds) the road is classified as a primary route. Over the years the road has been much improved with new by-passes opening at regular intervals. The last of these being the Broome – Ellingham bypass in March 2002.

== Norfolk ==
=== Gorleston-on-Sea to A146 ===
The A143 begins on Beccles Road as an off slip from the A47 road, in the Gorleston-on-Sea area of Great Yarmouth, this is close to the Stone Cross Roundabout. The road continues in a south-westerly direction. On leaving Gorleston-on-Sea there is a very short section of dual carriageway and from there the road is a strictly rural affair and there are not many straight sections.

This part of the route runs through some lovely countryside and passes many local attractions along the way. These include Fritton Lake, Caldecotte Hall and Redwings horse sanctuary. The route passes through the villages of St Olaves and Haddiscoe before joining up, for about 1 mile, with the A146 at a roundabout a few miles from Beccles. During the summer months this is an area very popular with holiday makers so the road can be quite busy at times.

=== A143 to Diss ===
The road in this area has undergone major changes in the last few decades. The original route took you through the centre of many towns and villages and has now been renumbered the B1062. From the Suffolk town of Bungay until Harleston the road follows the route of the now defunct Waveney Valley Line railway and progress along this section of the road is generally quite good as there are no reduced speed limits, save for Billingford. The road eventually intersects with the A140 Norwich to Ipswich road, just outside the Norfolk town of Diss.

== Suffolk ==
=== Diss to Bury St Edmunds ===
Once the road leaves Diss it returns to an older route. This takes it through a number of villages on the way to Bury including Great Barton, where there has long been a campaign for a bypass. Along this section the road crosses the A1088 Thetford to Woolpit road at Ixworth. The A1088 joins the A14 at Woolpit.

=== Bury St Edmunds to Haverhill ===
On arrival in Bury the road travels underneath the A14 and at this point the route is no longer considered primary and now becomes an ordinary A road. It then continues to wind through some nice Suffolk countryside until it links up with the A1307 at Haverhill. From here it is only a short distance to the M11 which gives easy access southwards to London and north to Cambridge. There is a section that won't allow overtaking on the left until Wickhambrook but then it won't last long. There is another section that follows a similar pattern but due to multiple painted islands.

== Safety ==
The road has been criticised for its road safety record, especially in Suffolk, where the road has been described as consistently one of the most dangerous roads in the county.

== Transport links ==
Along the route of the A143 you pass next to or very near to a number of railway stations.

Station	Operator	Destinations
Great Yarmouth	Greater Anglia Wherry Line	Norwich
Haddiscoe	Greater Anglia Wherry Line	Norwich, Lowestoft
Beccles	Greater Anglia East Suffolk Line	Lowestoft, Ipswich, London(Liverpool Street)
Diss	Greater Anglia Great Eastern Main Line	Norwich, Ipswich, London(Liverpool Street)
Bury St Edmunds	Greater Anglia Ipswich to Ely Line	Cambridge, Peterborough, Ipswich

== See also ==
- Chicken Roundabout
