= Mettingham Castle =

Castle in Mettingham, Suffolk, England

- Mettingham, Suffolk
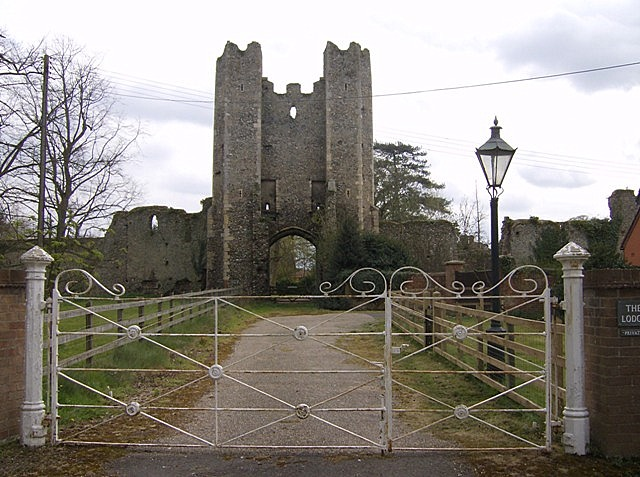
- Gatehouse of Mettingham Castle

Site information
- Type: Fortified manor house
- Owner: Private
- Open to the public: Yes, on selected days
- Condition: Ruined

Location
- Shown within Suffolk
- Coordinates: 52.4448°N 1.4714°E

Site history
- Materials: Stone

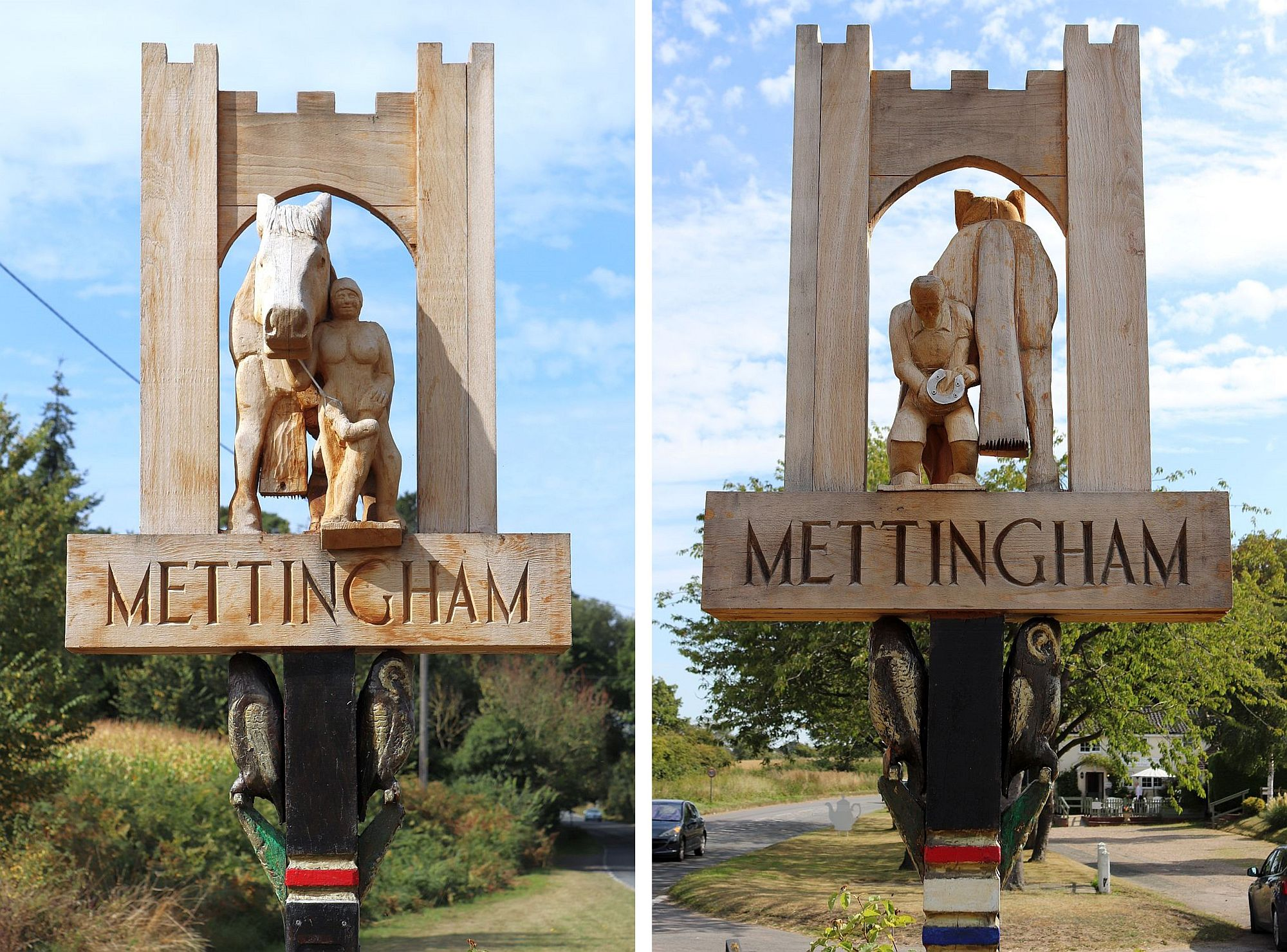
Mettingham Village Sign

Mettingham Castle was a fortified manor house in the parish of Mettingham in the north of the English county of Suffolk.

== Details ==
Mettingham Castle was founded by Sir John de Norwich, who was given a licence to crenellate his existing manor house on the site in 1342. The first house stood within a small moat, up to 15 foot wide with 6 foot high banks; upon receiving permission to crenellate, however, he built another court to the north of this, again moated, with a gateway to the north. Another moated court was later built to the south. An Edwardian style gatehouse formed the entrance to the castle and supplemented a stone wall that surrounded the property. By 1562, there were "stables, servants' lodgings, kitchen, bakehouse, brewhouse, malting house, storehouses, and an aisled hall" within the castle walls.

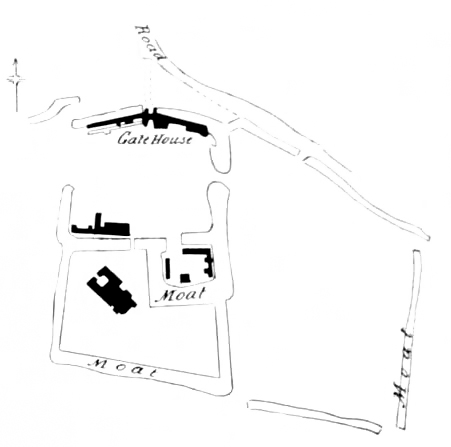
A late 19th century plan of the castle

The castle remained in Sir John's family until 1394, when it was given to a college of secular canons from nearby Norton, who established Mettingham College on the small moated court within the castle. The monks taught up to 13 boys at the castle. After the dissolution of the monasteries the property was sold off to a sequence of private owners after 1542. The castle was largely demolished in the 18th century to make way for a new farm house on the site, which lasted until around 1880 when it was pulled down in turn; the house rebuilt on the site reused parts of the original medieval stonework.

Today the site is a scheduled monument and a Grade II listed building; the gatehouse still survives, as do some of the stone walls and many of the surrounding moats and earthworks. In the 21st century a major renovation project occurred at the castle to repair the worsening damage, involving a grant of £330,000 by English Heritage.

== See also ==
- Castles in Great Britain and Ireland
- List of castles in England

== Bibliography ==
- Mackenzie, J.D. (1896) Castles of England. New York: Macmillan.
- Page, William. (ed) (1911) The Victoria History of Suffolk, Vol. 1. London: University of London.
- Wall, J. C. (1911) "Ancient Earthworks," in Page (ed) (1911).
