= William Dutt =

English writer and naturalist

William Alfred Dutt (1870 - 18 September 1939) was an East Anglian writer and naturalist. He was noted as a very knowledgeable recluse. For many years he lived in a cottage full of books in Carlton Colville, Suffolk.

== Selected bibliography ==
Many of his books have been digitised.

- 1896: George Borrow in East Anglia, London: D. Nutt.
- 1899: Highways, Byways and Waterways of East Anglia, Lowestoft: Dotesio & Todd. Frontispiece by Edwin A. Cox.
- 1900; Norfolk, London: Macmillian and Co. Reprinted several times.
- 1901: Highways and Byways in East Anglia, London: Macmillian and Co., reprinted 1914. Illustrated by Joseph Pennell.
- 1903 The Norfolk Broads, London: Methuen & Co.
- 1904: The King's homeland, Sandringham and north-west Norfolk London : Published for the Homeland association, by A. and C. Black.
- 1904 Suffolk, London: Methuen & Co.
- 1906 Wild life in East Anglia, London, Methuen & Co.
- 1907 Some literary associations of East Anglia, London: Methuen. Illustrated by Walter Dexter.
- 1910 The County Coast Series: The Norfolk and Suffolk Coast, New York: Frederick A. Stokes Company. Illustrated by Owen Dexter.
- 1916 Sunlit Norway, nature's wonderland, London: B & N Steamship Line and the Norwegian State Railways.
