= Carlton and Oulton Marshes =

Nature reserve in Suffolk, England

Coordinates: 52.47°N 1.69°E

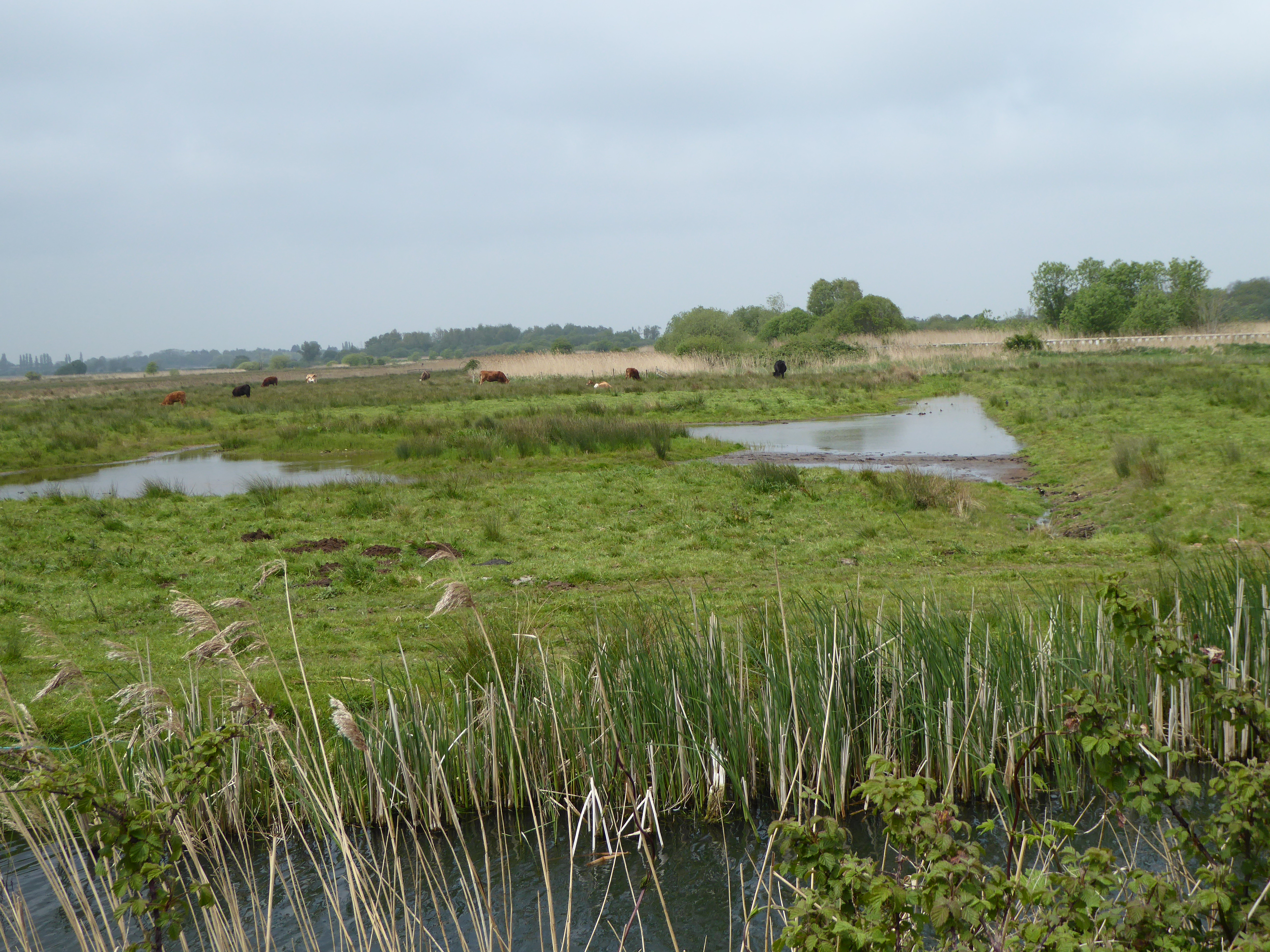
- Interactive map of Carlton and Oulton Marshes
- Type: Nature reserve
- Location: Lowestoft, Suffolk
- OS grid: TM509919
- Area: 151 hectares (370 acres)
- Manager: Suffolk Wildlife Trust

Carlton and Oulton Marshes is a 151 hectare nature reserve in Lowestoft in Suffolk. It is managed by the Suffolk Wildlife Trust. Carlton Marshes is part of the Sprat's Water and Marshes, Carlton Colville Site of Special Scientific Interest, the Broadland Ramsar internationally important wetland site, the Broadland Special Protection Area under the European Union Directive on the Conservation of Wild Birds, and The Broads Special Area of Conservation.

Carlton and Oulton Marshes are separated by Oulton Dyke. Birds of prey include marsh harriers, barn owls and hobbies, and there are many wintering wildfowl and breeding waders. Semi-aquatic fen raft spiders were released on the site in 2012 to boost the low British population, and underwater insectivorous bladderworts trap water fleas.

The Angles Way footpath passes through Carlton Marsh south of Oulton Dyke, and Oulton Marsh north of the Dyke is also accessible by footpaths.
