= Spexhall =

Village in Suffolk, England

Coordinates: 52.367°N 1.494°E

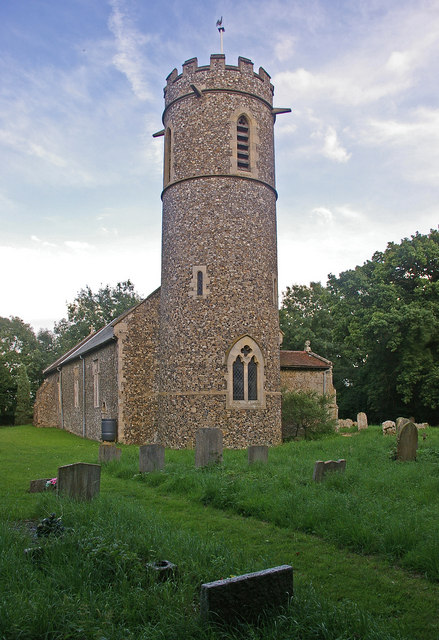
- St Peter's Church, Spexhall

- Location within Suffolk
- Population: 192 (2011)
- District: East Suffolk
- Shire county: Suffolk
- Region: East
- Country: England
- Sovereign state: United Kingdom
- Post town: Halesworth
- Postcode district: IP19
- Dialling code: 01986
- UK Parliament: Suffolk Coastal

Spexhall is a village and civil parish in the north-east of the English county of Suffolk. The village, which is dispersed in nature, is around 1.5 miles (2.4 km) north of the market town of Halesworth and 7 miles (11 km) south of Bungay in the East Suffolk district. It has few basic services, including a village hall and a parish church, which was originally built as a cell of Rumburgh Priory. The A144 road runs through the parish following the route of the Roman Stone Street. The population in 2011 was 192.

This description of Spexhall was written in the late nineteenth century:

SPEXHALL, a parish in Blything district, Suffolk; 2 miles NNW of Halesworth r. station. Post town, Halesworth. Acres, 1,484. Real property, £2,311. Pop., 181. Houses, 36. The property is divided among a few. The living is a rectory in the diocese of Norwich. Value, £277.* Patron, the Lord Chancellor. The church is old. Charities, £15.
