= List of civil parishes in Suffolk =

This is a list of civil parishes in the ceremonial county of Suffolk, England. There are 479 civil parishes. Civil Parishes were established by the Local Government Act 1894 which also established the Rural districts listed below.

== Babergh ==
The whole of the district is parished.

| Image | Name | Status | Population | District | Former local authority | Refs |
|---|---|---|---|---|---|---|
| | Acton | Civil parish | 1800 | Babergh | Melford Rural District | |
| | Aldham | Civil parish | 200 | Babergh | Cosford Rural District | |
| | Alpheton | Civil parish | 242 | Babergh | Melford Rural District | |
| | Arwarton | Civil parish | 110 | Babergh | Samford Rural District | |
| | Assington | Civil parish | 371 | Babergh | Melford Rural District | |
| | Belstead | Civil parish | 189 | Babergh | Samford Rural District | |
| | Bentley | Civil parish | 727 | Babergh | Samford Rural District | |
| | Bildeston | Civil parish | 1011 | Babergh | Cosford Rural District | |
| | Boxford | Civil parish | 1258 | Babergh | Cosford Rural District | |
| | Boxted | Civil parish | 107 | Babergh | Melford Rural District | |
| | Brantham | Civil parish | 2566 | Babergh | Samford Rural District | |
| | Brent Eleigh | Civil parish | 174 | Babergh | Cosford Rural District | |
| | Brettenham | Civil parish | 353 | Babergh | Cosford Rural District | |
| | Bures St Mary | Civil parish | 918 | Babergh | Melford Rural District | |
| | Burstall | Civil parish | 198 | Babergh | Samford Rural District | |
| | Capel St Mary | Civil parish | 2847 | Babergh | Samford Rural District | |
| | Chattisham | Civil parish | 167 | Babergh | Samford Rural District | |
| | Chelmondiston | Civil parish | 1054 | Babergh | Samford Rural District | |
| | Chelsworth | Civil parish | 206 | Babergh | Cosford Rural District | |
| | Chilton | Civil parish | 367 | Babergh | Melford Rural District | |
| | Cockfield | Civil parish | 868 | Babergh | Cosford Rural District | |
| | Copdock and Washbrook | Civil parish | 1114 | Babergh | Samford Rural District | |
| | East Bergholt | Civil parish | 2,765 | Babergh | Samford Rural District | |
| | Edwardstone | Civil parish | 352 | Babergh | Cosford Rural District | |
| | Elmsett | Civil parish | 788 | Babergh | Cosford Rural District | |
| | Freston | Civil parish | 120 | Babergh | Samford Rural District | |
| | Glemsford | Civil parish | 3,382 | Babergh | Melford Rural District | |
| | Great Cornard | Civil parish | 8,908 | Babergh | Melford Rural District | |
| | Great Waldingfield | Civil parish | 1,431 | Babergh | Melford Rural District | |
| | Groton | Civil parish | 288 | Babergh | Cosford Rural District | |
| | Hadleigh (town) | Civil parish | 8,253 | Babergh | Hadleigh Urban District | |
| | Harkstead | Civil parish | 287 | Babergh | Samford Rural District | |
| | Hartest | Civil parish | 446 | Babergh | Melford Rural District | |
| | Higham | Civil parish | 203 | Babergh | Samford Rural District | |
| | Hintlesham | Civil parish | 609 | Babergh | Samford Rural District | |
| | Hitcham | Civil parish | 774 | Babergh | Cosford Rural District | |
| | Holbrook | Civil parish | 2,180 | Babergh | Samford Rural District | |
| | Holton St Mary | Civil parish | 201 | Babergh | Samford Rural District | |
| | Kersey | Civil parish | 359 | Babergh | Cosford Rural District | |
| | Kettlebaston | Civil parish | | Babergh | Cosford Rural District | |
| | Lavenham | Civil parish | 1,722 | Babergh | Cosford Rural District | |
| | Lawshall | Civil parish | 968 | Babergh | Melford Rural District | |
| | Layham | Civil parish | 589 | Babergh | Cosford Rural District | |
| | Leavenheath | Civil parish | 1,370 | Babergh | Melford Rural District | |
| | Lindsey | Civil parish | 208 | Babergh | Cosford Rural District | |
| | Little Cornard | Civil parish | 286 | Babergh | Melford Rural District | |
| | Little Waldingfield | Civil parish | 366 | Babergh | Melford Rural District | |
| | Long Melford | Civil parish | 3,518 | Babergh | Melford Rural District | |
| | Milden | Civil parish | 101 | Babergh | Cosford Rural District | |
| | Monks Eleigh | Civil parish | 505 | Babergh | Cosford Rural District | |
| | Nayland-with-Wissington | Civil parish | 1,163 | Babergh | Melford Rural District | |
| | Nedging-with-Naughton | Civil parish | 404 | Babergh | Cosford Rural District | |
| | Newton | Civil parish | 495 | Babergh | Melford Rural District | |
| | Pinewood | Civil parish | 4,342 | Babergh | Samford Rural District | |
| | Polstead | Civil parish | 851 | Babergh | Cosford Rural District | |
| | Preston St Mary | Civil parish | 177 | Babergh | Cosford Rural District | |
| | Raydon | Civil parish | 507 | Babergh | Samford Rural District | |
| | Semer | Civil parish | 130 | Babergh | Cosford Rural District | |
| | Shelley | Civil parish | | Babergh | Samford Rural District | |
| | Shimpling | Civil parish | 431 | Babergh | Melford Rural District | |
| | Shotley | Civil parish | 2,342 | Babergh | Samford Rural District | |
| | Somerton | Civil parish | 212 | Babergh | Melford Rural District | |
| | Sproughton | Civil parish | 1,376 | Babergh | Samford Rural District | |
| | Stanstead | Civil parish | 319 | Babergh | Melford Rural District | |
| | Stoke-by-Nayland | Civil parish | 682 | Babergh | Melford Rural District | |
| | Stratford St Mary | Civil parish | 701 | Babergh | Samford Rural District | |
| | Stutton | Civil parish | 812 | Babergh | Samford Rural District | |
| | Sudbury | Town | 13,063 | Babergh | Sudbury Municipal Borough | |
| | Tattingstone | Civil parish | 540 | Babergh | Samford Rural District | |
| | Thorpe Morieux | Civil parish | 232 | Babergh | Cosford Rural District | |
| | Wattisham | Civil parish | | Babergh | Cosford Rural District | |
| | Wenham Magna | Civil parish | 185 | Babergh | Samford Rural District | |
| | Wenham Parva | Civil parish | | Babergh | Samford Rural District | |
| | Whatfield | Civil parish | 335 | Babergh | Cosford Rural District | |
| | Wherstead | Civil parish | 342 | Babergh | Samford Rural District | |
| | Woolverstone | Civil parish | 265 | Babergh | Samford Rural District | |

== West Suffolk ==
Much of the district was formerly known as Forest Heath District prior to re-organisation on 1 April 2019, when this former district was merged with the Borough of St Edmundsbury.

The whole of the district is parished.

| Image | Name | Status | Population | District | Former local authority | Refs |
|---|---|---|---|---|---|---|
| | Barton Mills | Civil parish | 867 | West Suffolk | Mildenhall Rural District | |
| | Beck Row, Holywell Row and Kenny Hill | Civil parish | 4048 | West Suffolk | Mildenhall Rural District | |
| | Brandon | Civil parish | 8756 | West Suffolk | Mildenhall Rural District | |
| | Cavenham | Civil parish | 127 | West Suffolk | Mildenhall Rural District | |
| | Dalham | Civil parish | 199 | West Suffolk | Mildenhall Rural District | |
| | Elveden | Civil parish | 248 | West Suffolk | Mildenhall Rural District | |
| | Eriswell | Civil parish | 4438 | West Suffolk | Mildenhall Rural District | |
| | Exning | Civil parish | 1944 | West Suffolk | Newmarket Urban District | |
| | Freckenham | Civil parish | 365 | West Suffolk | Mildenhall Rural District | |
| | Gazeley | Civil parish | 692 | West Suffolk | Mildenhall Rural District | |
| | Herringswell | Civil parish | 197 | West Suffolk | Mildenhall Rural District | |
| | Higham | Civil parish | 151 | West Suffolk | Mildenhall Rural District | |
| | Icklingham | Civil parish | 422 | West Suffolk | Mildenhall Rural District | |
| | Kentford | Civil parish | 408 | West Suffolk | Mildenhall Rural District | |
| | Lakenheath | Civil parish | 4490 | West Suffolk | Mildenhall Rural District | |
| | Mildenhall High | Civil parish | 9906 | West Suffolk | Mildenhall Rural District | |
| | Moulton | Civil parish | 1017 | West Suffolk | Mildenhall Rural District | |
| | Newmarket | Civil parish | 14995 | West Suffolk | Newmarket Urban District | |
| | Red Lodge | Civil parish | 1599 | West Suffolk | Mildenhall Rural District | |
| | Santon Downham | Civil parish | 245 | West Suffolk | Mildenhall Rural District | |
| | Tuddenham | Civil parish | 416 | West Suffolk | Mildenhall Rural District | |
| | West Row | Civil parish | | West Suffolk | Mildenhall Rural District | |
| | Worlington | Civil parish | 480 | West Suffolk | Mildenhall Rural District | |

== Other Districts ==
Ipswich is unparished. Population figures are unavailable for some of the smallest parishes.

| Civil Parish | Civil Parish Population 2011 | Area (km^{2}) 2011 | Pre 1974 District | District |
|---|---|---|---|---|
| Akenham | | | Gipping Rural District | Mid Suffolk |
| Aldeburgh (town) | 2,466 | 9.69 | Aldeburgh Municipal Borough | Suffolk Coastal |
| Alderton | 423 | 10.42 | Deben Rural District | Suffolk Coastal |
| Aldringham cum Thorpe | 759 | 7.95 | Blyth Rural District | Suffolk Coastal |
| All Saints and St Nicholas, South Elmham | 233 | 12.3 | Wainford Rural District | Waveney (East Suffolk) |
| Ampton | 171 | 14.15 | Thingoe Rural District | St Edmundsbury (West Suffolk) |
| Ashbocking | 356 | 5.72 | Gipping Rural District | Mid Suffolk |
| Ashfield cum Thorpe | 219 | 6.39 | Gipping Rural District | Mid Suffolk |
| Aspall | | | Hartismere Rural District | Mid Suffolk |
| Athelington | | | Hartismere Rural District | Mid Suffolk |
| Bacton | 1,228 | 9.24 | Hartismere Rural District | Mid Suffolk |
| Badingham | 489 | 13.00 | Blyth Rural District | Suffolk Coastal |
| Badley | | | Gipping Rural District | Mid Suffolk |
| Badwell Ash | 770 | 7.51 | Thedwastre Rural District | Mid Suffolk |
| Bardwell | 785 | 9.97 | Thingoe Rural District | St Edmundsbury (West Suffolk) |
| Barham | 1,504 | 7.29 | Gipping Rural District | Mid Suffolk |
| Barking | 446 | 12.75 | Gipping Rural District | Mid Suffolk |
| Barnardiston | 168 | 5.07 | Clare Rural District | St Edmundsbury (West Suffolk) |
| Barnby | 479 | 4.46 | Lothingland Rural District | Waveney (East Suffolk) |
| Barnham | 606 | 21.39 | Thingoe Rural District | St Edmundsbury (West Suffolk) |
| Barningham | 956 | 5.33 | Thingoe Rural District | St Edmundsbury (West Suffolk) |
| Barrow | 1,677 | 10.85 | Thingoe Rural District | St Edmundsbury (West Suffolk) |
| Barsham | 215 | 6.98 | Wainford Rural District | Waveney (East Suffolk) |
| Battisford | 458 | 6.40 | Gipping Rural District | Mid Suffolk |
| Bawdsey | 276 | 6.41 | Deben Rural District | Suffolk Coastal |
| Baylham | 266 | 5.49 | Gipping Rural District | Mid Suffolk |
| Beccles (town) | 10,123 | 8.14 | Beccles Municipal Borough | Waveney (East Suffolk) |
| Bedfield | 324 | 5.14 | Hartismere Rural District | Mid Suffolk |
| Bedingfield | 404 | 13.56 | Hartismere Rural District | Mid Suffolk |
| Benacre | 111 | 19.34 | Lothingland Rural District | Waveney (East Suffolk) |
| Benhall | 521 | 8.71 | Blyth Rural District | Suffolk Coastal |
| Beyton | 713 | 2.63 | Thedwastre Rural District | Mid Suffolk |
| Blaxhall | 194 | 8.17 | Deben Rural District | Suffolk Coastal |
| Blundeston | 1,637 | 6.43 | Lothingland Rural District | Waveney (East Suffolk) |
| Blyford | | | Wainford Rural District | Waveney (East Suffolk) |
| Blythburgh | 298 | 15.66 | Blyth Rural District | Suffolk Coastal |
| Botesdale | 905 | 16.13 | Hartismere Rural District | Mid Suffolk |
| Boulge | | | Deben Rural District | Suffolk Coastal |
| Boyton | 147 | 6.19 | Deben Rural District | Suffolk Coastal |
| Bradfield Combust with Stanningfield | 578 | 8.80 | Thingoe Rural District | St Edmundsbury (West Suffolk) |
| Bradfield St Clare | 143 | 6.29 | Thingoe Rural District | St Edmundsbury (West Suffolk) |
| Bradfield St George | 420 | 7.97 | Thingoe Rural District | St Edmundsbury (West Suffolk) |
| Braiseworth | | | Hartismere Rural District | Mid Suffolk |
| Bramfield | 487 | 16.39 | Blyth Rural District | Suffolk Coastal |
| Bramford | 2,303 | 11.50 | Gipping Rural District | Mid Suffolk |
| Brampton with Stoven | 427 | 11.66 | Wainford Rural District | Waveney (East Suffolk) |
| Brandeston | 296 | 5.05 | Blyth Rural District | Suffolk Coastal |
| Bredfield | 340 | 4.48 | Deben Rural District | Suffolk Coastal |
| Brightwell | | | Deben Rural District | Suffolk Coastal |
| Brockley | 312 | 6.17 | Thingoe Rural District | St Edmundsbury (West Suffolk) |
| Brome and Oakley | 475 | 8.95 | Hartismere Rural District | Mid Suffolk |
| Bromeswell | 314 | 5.24 | Deben Rural District | Suffolk Coastal |
| Bruisyard | 160 | 4.81 | Blyth Rural District | Suffolk Coastal |
| Brundish | 287 | 15.23 | Hartismere Rural District | Mid Suffolk |
| Bucklesham | 526 | 6.96 | Deben Rural District | Suffolk Coastal |
| Bungay (town) | 5,127 | 10.70 | Bungay Urban District | Waveney (East Suffolk) |
| Burgate | 160 | 8.36 | Hartismere Rural District | Mid Suffolk |
| Burgh | 182 | 5.03 | Deben Rural District | Suffolk Coastal |
| Bury St Edmunds (town) | 40,664 | 16.95 | Bury St Edmunds Municipal Borough | St Edmundsbury (West Suffolk) |
| Butley | 383 | 33.58 | Deben Rural District | Suffolk Coastal |
| Buxhall | 475 | 10.36 | Gipping Rural District | Mid Suffolk |
| Campsey Ash | 375 | 7.38 | Deben Rural District | Suffolk Coastal |
| Capel St Andrew | | | Deben Rural District | Suffolk Coastal |
| Carlton Colville (town) | 8,505 | 8.20 | Lothingland Rural District | Waveney (East Suffolk) |
| Cavendish | 1,026 | 13.53 | Clare Rural District | St Edmundsbury (West Suffolk) |
| Charsfield | 355 | 5.57 | Deben Rural District | Suffolk Coastal |
| Chedburgh | 597 | 2.48 | Thingoe Rural District | St Edmundsbury (West Suffolk) |
| Chediston | 195 | 10.11 | Blyth Rural District | Suffolk Coastal |
| Chevington | 602 | 9.72 | Thingoe Rural District | St Edmundsbury (West Suffolk) |
| Chillesford | | | Deben Rural District | Suffolk Coastal |
| Clare | 2,028 | 9.26 | Clare Rural District | St Edmundsbury (West Suffolk) |
| Claydon | 2,197 | 4.04 | Gipping Rural District | Mid Suffolk |
| Clopton | 375 | 8.50 | Deben Rural District | Suffolk Coastal |
| Coddenham | 620 | 11.08 | Gipping Rural District | Mid Suffolk |
| Combs | 852 | 10.59 | Gipping Rural District | Mid Suffolk |
| Coney Weston | 394 | 6.69 | Thingoe Rural District | St Edmundsbury (West Suffolk) |
| Cookley | 109 | 6.99 | Blyth Rural District | Suffolk Coastal |
| Corton | 1,099 | 3.78 | Lothingland Rural District | Waveney (East Suffolk) |
| Cotton | 526 | 8.13 | Hartismere Rural District | Mid Suffolk |
| Covehithe | | | Lothingland Rural District | Waveney (East Suffolk) |
| Cowlinge | 548 | 12.43 | Clare Rural District | St Edmundsbury (West Suffolk) |
| Cransford | 162 | 4.75 | Blyth Rural District | Suffolk Coastal |
| Cratfield | 292 | 8.61 | Blyth Rural District | Suffolk Coastal |
| Creeting St Mary | 697 | 10.67 | Gipping Rural District | Mid Suffolk |
| Creeting St Peter | 275 | 5.21 | Gipping Rural District | Mid Suffolk |
| Cretingham | 196 | 6.68 | Deben Rural District | Suffolk Coastal |
| Crowfield | 361 | 7.48 | Gipping Rural District | Mid Suffolk |
| Culford | 578 | 9.02 | Thingoe Rural District | St Edmundsbury (West Suffolk) |
| Culpho | | | Deben Rural District | Suffolk Coastal |
| Dallinghoo | 171 | 6.37 | Deben Rural District | Suffolk Coastal |
| Darmsden | | | Gipping Rural District | Mid Suffolk |
| Darsham | 300 | 6.44 | Blyth Rural District | Suffolk Coastal |
| Debach | 126 | 4.08 | Deben Rural District | Suffolk Coastal |
| Debenham | 2,210 | 16.89 | Gipping Rural District | Mid Suffolk |
| Denham | 197 | 5.19 | Hartismere Rural District | Mid Suffolk |
| Denham | 171 | 5.30 | Thingoe Rural District | St Edmundsbury (West Suffolk) |
| Dennington | 578 | 13.24 | Blyth Rural District | Suffolk Coastal |
| Denston | 104 | 4.85 | Clare Rural District | St Edmundsbury (West Suffolk) |
| Depden | 184 | 6.87 | Clare Rural District | St Edmundsbury (West Suffolk) |
| Drinkstone | 548 | 9.08 | Thedwastre Rural District | Mid Suffolk |
| Dunwich | 183 | 26.64 | Blyth Rural District | Suffolk Coastal |
| Earl Soham | 455 | 8.00 | Blyth Rural District | Suffolk Coastal |
| Earl Stonham | 629 | 10.41 | Gipping Rural District | Mid Suffolk |
| Easton | 331 | 6.01 | Blyth Rural District | Suffolk Coastal |
| Ellough | | | Wainford Rural District | Waveney (East Suffolk) |
| Elmswell | 3,950 | 8.58 | Thedwastre Rural District | Mid Suffolk |
| Euston | 138 | 21.92 | Thingoe Rural District | St Edmundsbury (West Suffolk) |
| Eye (town) | 2,154 | 17.85 | Eye Municipal Borough | Mid Suffolk |
| Eyke | 362 | 12.62 | Deben Rural District | Suffolk Coastal |
| Fakenham Magna | 167 | 7.50 | Thingoe Rural District | St Edmundsbury (West Suffolk) |
| Falkenham | 170 | 6.18 | Deben Rural District | Suffolk Coastal |
| Farnham | 118 | 4.95 | Blyth Rural District | Suffolk Coastal |
| Felixstowe (town) | 23,689 | 16.60 | Felixstowe Urban District | Suffolk Coastal |
| Felsham | 448 | 6.69 | Thedwastre Rural District | Mid Suffolk |
| Finningham | 480 | 5.09 | Hartismere Rural District | Mid Suffolk |
| Flempton | 149 | 3.80 | Thingoe Rural District | St Edmundsbury (West Suffolk) |
| Flixton | | | Lothingland Rural District | Waveney (East Suffolk) |
| Flixton | 176 | 7.18 | Wainford Rural District | Waveney (East Suffolk) |
| Flowton | 117 | 1.99 | Gipping Rural District | Mid Suffolk |
| Fornham All Saints | 1,160 | 5.14 | Thingoe Rural District | St Edmundsbury (West Suffolk) |
| Fornham St Genevieve | | | Thingoe Rural District | St Edmundsbury (West Suffolk) |
| Fornham St Martin | 1,319 | 8.02 | Thingoe Rural District | St Edmundsbury (West Suffolk) |
| Foxhall | 200 | 9.35 | Deben Rural District | Suffolk Coastal |
| Framlingham (town) | 3,342 | 18.97 | Blyth Rural District | Suffolk Coastal |
| Framsden | 357 | 11.59 | Gipping Rural District | Mid Suffolk |
| Fressingfield | 1,021 | 18.70 | Hartismere Rural District | Mid Suffolk |
| Friston | 344 | 10.70 | Blyth Rural District | Suffolk Coastal |
| Frostenden | 167 | 5.35 | Lothingland Rural District | Waveney (East Suffolk) |
| Gedding | 125 | 2.00 | Thedwastre Rural District | Mid Suffolk |
| Gedgrave | | | Deben Rural District | Suffolk Coastal |
| Gipping | | | Gipping Rural District | Mid Suffolk |
| Gisleham | 778 | 6.35 | Lothingland Rural District | Waveney (East Suffolk) |
| Gislingham | 1,040 | 9.20 | Hartismere Rural District | Mid Suffolk |
| Gosbeck | 236 | 5.51 | Gipping Rural District | Mid Suffolk |
| Great Ashfield | 378 | 6.36 | Thedwastre Rural District | Mid Suffolk |
| Great Barton | 2,191 | 15.05 | Thingoe Rural District | St Edmundsbury (West Suffolk) |
| Great Bealings | 302 | 4.19 | Deben Rural District | Suffolk Coastal |
| Great Blakenham | 1,235 | 3.46 | Gipping Rural District | Mid Suffolk |
| Great Bradley | 431 | 13.42 | Clare Rural District | St Edmundsbury (West Suffolk) |
| Great Bricett | 1,530 | 3.77 | Gipping Rural District | Mid Suffolk |
| Great Finborough | 808 | 6.85 | Gipping Rural District | Mid Suffolk |
| Great Glemham | 224 | 7.77 | Blyth Rural District | Suffolk Coastal |
| Great Livermere | 226 | 6.51 | Thingoe Rural District | St Edmundsbury (West Suffolk) |
| Great Thurlow | 213 | 8.29 | Clare Rural District | St Edmundsbury (West Suffolk) |
| Great Whelnetham | 849 | 6.22 | Thingoe Rural District | St Edmundsbury (West Suffolk) |
| Great Wratting | 196 | 5.45 | Clare Rural District | St Edmundsbury (West Suffolk) |
| Grundisburgh | 1,584 | 10.67 | Deben Rural District | Suffolk Coastal |
| Hacheston | 345 | 7.21 | Blyth Rural District | Suffolk Coastal |
| Halesworth (town) | 4,726 | 4.47 | Halesworth Urban District | Waveney (East Suffolk) |
| Hargrave | 310 | 7.21 | Thingoe Rural District | St Edmundsbury (West Suffolk) |
| Harleston | 204 | 4.71 | Gipping Rural District | Mid Suffolk |
| Hasketon | 402 | 6.81 | Deben Rural District | Suffolk Coastal |
| Haughley | 1,638 | 11.16 | Gipping Rural District | Mid Suffolk |
| Haverhill (town) | 27,041 | 10.97 | Haverhill Urban District | St Edmundsbury (West Suffolk) |
| Hawkedon | 134 | 5.99 | Clare Rural District | St Edmundsbury (West Suffolk) |
| Hawstead | 338 | 9.45 | Thingoe Rural District | St Edmundsbury (West Suffolk) |
| Helmingham | 186 | 9.93 | Gipping Rural District | Mid Suffolk |
| Hemingstone | 244 | 5.87 | Gipping Rural District | Mid Suffolk |
| Hemley | | | Deben Rural District | Suffolk Coastal |
| Hengrave | 173 | 3.64 | Thingoe Rural District | St Edmundsbury (West Suffolk) |
| Henley | 573 | 5.00 | Gipping Rural District | Mid Suffolk |
| Henstead with Hulver Street | 408 | 11.02 | Lothingland Rural District | Waveney (East Suffolk) |
| Hepworth | 536 | 6.86 | Thingoe Rural District | St Edmundsbury (West Suffolk) |
| Hessett | 464 | 6.49 | Thedwastre Rural District | Mid Suffolk |
| Heveningham | 223 | 11.64 | Blyth Rural District | Suffolk Coastal |
| Hinderclay | 326 | 6.01 | Thedwastre Rural District | Mid Suffolk |
| Hollesley | 1,581 | 16.05 | Deben Rural District | Suffolk Coastal |
| Holton | 832 | 5.15 | Wainford Rural District | Waveney (East Suffolk) |
| St Mary, South Elmham otherwise Homersfield | 158 | 4.06 | Wainford Rural District | Waveney (East Suffolk) |
| Honington | 1,472 | 4.74 | Thingoe Rural District | St Edmundsbury (West Suffolk) |
| Hoo | 160 | 9.52 | Deben Rural District | Suffolk Coastal |
| Hopton | 653 | 9.93 | Thingoe Rural District | St Edmundsbury (West Suffolk) |
| Horham | 305 | 5.89 | Hartismere Rural District | Mid Suffolk |
| Horringer | 1,055 | 13.40 | Thingoe Rural District | St Edmundsbury (West Suffolk) |
| Hoxne | 889 | 16.40 | Hartismere Rural District | Mid Suffolk |
| Hundon | 1,894 | 18.40 | Clare Rural District | St Edmundsbury (West Suffolk) |
| Hunston | 197 | 7.81 | Thedwastre Rural District | Mid Suffolk |
| Huntingfield | 188 | 8.71 | Blyth Rural District | Suffolk Coastal |
| Ickworth | | | Thingoe Rural District | St Edmundsbury (West Suffolk) |
| Iken | 101 | 10.77 | Deben Rural District | Suffolk Coastal |
| Ingham | 451 | 7.40 | Thingoe Rural District | St Edmundsbury (West Suffolk) |
| Ixworth Thorpe | | | Thingoe Rural District | St Edmundsbury (West Suffolk) |
| Ixworth | 2,365 | 13.64 | Thingoe Rural District | St Edmundsbury (West Suffolk) |
| Kedington | 1,849 | 9.52 | Clare Rural District | St Edmundsbury (West Suffolk) |
| Kelsale cum Carlton | 990 | 14.36 | Blyth Rural District | Suffolk Coastal |
| Kenton | 237 | 4.97 | Hartismere Rural District | Mid Suffolk |
| Kesgrave (town) | 14,168 | 5.42 | Deben Rural District | Suffolk Coastal |
| Kessingland | 4,327 | 7.02 | Lothingland Rural District | Waveney (East Suffolk) |
| Kettleburgh | 231 | 5.87 | Blyth Rural District | Suffolk Coastal |
| Kirton | 1,146 | 8.29 | Deben Rural District | Suffolk Coastal |
| Knettishall | | | Thingoe Rural District | St Edmundsbury (West Suffolk) |
| Knodishall | 852 | 7.09 | Blyth Rural District | Suffolk Coastal |
| Lackford | 255 | 9.45 | Thingoe Rural District | St Edmundsbury (West Suffolk) |
| Langham | | | Thedwastre Rural District | Mid Suffolk |
| Laxfield | 910 | 15.06 | Hartismere Rural District | Mid Suffolk |
| Leiston (town) | 5,508 | 18.03 | Leiston cum Sizewell Urban District | Suffolk Coastal |
| Letheringham | | | Deben Rural District | Suffolk Coastal |
| Levington | 259 | 6.98 | Deben Rural District | Suffolk Coastal |
| Lidgate | 241 | 8.23 | Clare Rural District | St Edmundsbury (West Suffolk) |
| Linstead Magna | | | Blyth Rural District | Suffolk Coastal |
| Linstead Parva | 132 | 7.67 | Blyth Rural District | Suffolk Coastal |
| Little Bealings | 420 | 3.23 | Deben Rural District | Suffolk Coastal |
| Little Blakenham | 295 | 4.33 | Gipping Rural District | Mid Suffolk |
| Little Bradley | | | Clare Rural District | St Edmundsbury (West Suffolk) |
| Little Finborough | | | Gipping Rural District | Mid Suffolk |
| Little Glemham | 187 | 5.20 | Blyth Rural District | Suffolk Coastal |
| Little Livermere | | | Thingoe Rural District | St Edmundsbury (West Suffolk) |
| Little Thurlow | 249 | 5.71 | Clare Rural District | St Edmundsbury (West Suffolk) |
| Little Whelnetham | 188 | 2.15 | Thingoe Rural District | St Edmundsbury (West Suffolk) |
| Little Wratting | 147 | 3.69 | Clare Rural District | St Edmundsbury (West Suffolk) |
| Lound | 359 | 5.11 | Lothingland Rural District | Waveney (East Suffolk) |
| Lowestoft | | | Lowestoft Municipal Borough | Waveney (East Suffolk) |
| Market Weston | 245 | 3.97 | Thingoe Rural District | St Edmundsbury (West Suffolk) |
| Marlesford | 233 | 5.27 | Blyth Rural District | Suffolk Coastal |
| Martlesham | 5,478 | 10.99 | Deben Rural District | Suffolk Coastal |
| Mellis | 519 | 5.52 | Hartismere Rural District | Mid Suffolk |
| Melton | 3,741 | 5.68 | Deben Rural District | Suffolk Coastal |
| Mendham | 451 | 11.76 | Hartismere Rural District | Mid Suffolk |
| Mendlesham | 1,407 | 16.02 | Hartismere Rural District | Mid Suffolk |
| Metfield | 388 | 9.46 | Hartismere Rural District | Mid Suffolk |
| Mettingham | 211 | 5.61 | Wainford Rural District | Waveney (East Suffolk) |
| Mickfield | 231 | 5.16 | Gipping Rural District | Mid Suffolk |
| Middleton | 343 | 8.28 | Blyth Rural District | Suffolk Coastal |
| Monewden | 120 | 4.46 | Deben Rural District | Suffolk Coastal |
| Monk Soham | 156 | 6.54 | Hartismere Rural District | Mid Suffolk |
| Mutford | 471 | 6.47 | Lothingland Rural District | Waveney (East Suffolk) |
| Nacton | 757 | 7.77 | Deben Rural District | Suffolk Coastal |
| Needham Market (town) | 4,528 | 6.42 | Gipping Rural District | Mid Suffolk |
| Nettlestead | | | Gipping Rural District | Mid Suffolk |
| Newbourne | 304 | 6.63 | Deben Rural District | Suffolk Coastal |
| North Cove | 449 | 5.06 | Wainford Rural District | Waveney (East Suffolk) |
| Norton | 1,003 | 9.95 | Thedwastre Rural District | Mid Suffolk |
| Nowton | 163 | 4.71 | Thingoe Rural District | St Edmundsbury (West Suffolk) |
| Occold | 519 | 6.11 | Hartismere Rural District | Mid Suffolk |
| Offton | 358 | 6.34 | Gipping Rural District | Mid Suffolk |
| Old Newton with Dagworth | 1,211 | 14.04 | Gipping Rural District | Mid Suffolk |
| Onehouse | 877 | 3.94 | Gipping Rural District | Mid Suffolk |
| Orford | 713 | 19.17 | Deben Rural District | Suffolk Coastal |
| Otley | 676 | 8.77 | Deben Rural District | Suffolk Coastal |
| Oulton Broad | | | Lowestoft Municipal Borough | Waveney (East Suffolk) |
| Oulton | 4,060 | 6.97 | Lothingland Rural District | Waveney (East Suffolk) |
| Ousden | 266 | 5.60 | Clare Rural District | St Edmundsbury (West Suffolk) |
| Pakenham | 922 | 14.73 | Thingoe Rural District | St Edmundsbury (West Suffolk) |
| Palgrave | 905 | 6.08 | Hartismere Rural District | Mid Suffolk |
| Parham | 263 | 8.96 | Blyth Rural District | Suffolk Coastal |
| Peasenhall | 517 | 8.86 | Blyth Rural District | Suffolk Coastal |
| Pettaugh | 207 | 3.27 | Gipping Rural District | Mid Suffolk |
| Pettistree | 194 | 7.19 | Deben Rural District | Suffolk Coastal |
| Playford | 215 | 5.12 | Deben Rural District | Suffolk Coastal |
| Poslingford | 187 | 9.87 | Clare Rural District | St Edmundsbury (West Suffolk) |
| Purdis Farm | 2,092 | 3.27 | Deben Rural District | Suffolk Coastal |
| Ramsholt | | | Deben Rural District | Suffolk Coastal |
| Rattlesden | 959 | 13.18 | Thedwastre Rural District | Mid Suffolk |
| Rede | 131 | 5.02 | Thingoe Rural District | St Edmundsbury (West Suffolk) |
| Redgrave | 459 | 2.65 | Hartismere Rural District | Mid Suffolk |
| Redisham | 125 | 2.98 | Wainford Rural District | Waveney (East Suffolk) |
| Redlingfield | 144 | 6.30 | Hartismere Rural District | Mid Suffolk |
| Rendham | 216 | 6.94 | Blyth Rural District | Suffolk Coastal |
| Rendlesham | 3,013 | 8.24 | Deben Rural District | Suffolk Coastal |
| Reydon | 2,582 | 11.54 | Lothingland Rural District | Waveney (East Suffolk) |
| Rickinghall Inferior | 449 | 8.01 | Thedwastre Rural District | Mid Suffolk |
| Rickinghall Superior | 719 | 0.68 | Hartismere Rural District | Mid Suffolk |
| Ringsfield | 323 | 7.42 | Wainford Rural District | Waveney (East Suffolk) |
| Ringshall | 670 | 8.64 | Gipping Rural District | Mid Suffolk |
| Risby | 866 | 11.35 | Thingoe Rural District | St Edmundsbury (West Suffolk) |
| Rishangles | | | Hartismere Rural District | Mid Suffolk |
| Rumburgh | 327 | 6.23 | Wainford Rural District | Waveney (East Suffolk) |
| Rushbrooke with Rougham | 1,200 | 19.92 | Thingoe Rural District | St Edmundsbury (West Suffolk) |
| Rushmere St Andrew | 6,185 | 5.57 | Deben Rural District | Suffolk Coastal |
| Rushmere | | | Lothingland Rural District | Waveney (East Suffolk) |
| Sapiston | 178 | 5.19 | Thingoe Rural District | St Edmundsbury (West Suffolk) |
| Saxmundham (town) | 3,644 | 5.45 | Saxmundham Urban District | Suffolk Coastal |
| Saxtead | 335 | 4.89 | Blyth Rural District | Suffolk Coastal |
| Shadingfield | 178 | 5.67 | Wainford Rural District | Waveney (East Suffolk) |
| Shelland | | | Gipping Rural District | Mid Suffolk |
| Shipmeadow | 140 | 3.31 | Wainford Rural District | Waveney (East Suffolk) |
| Shottisham | 197 | 12.06 | Deben Rural District | Suffolk Coastal |
| Sibton | 182 | 11.23 | Blyth Rural District | Suffolk Coastal |
| Snape | 611 | 6.90 | Blyth Rural District | Suffolk Coastal |
| Somerleyton, Ashby and Herringfleet | | 4.27 | Lothingland Rural District | Waveney (East Suffolk) |
| Somersham | 733 | 4.42 | Gipping Rural District | Mid Suffolk |
| Sotherton | 193 | 7.98 | Wainford Rural District | Waveney (East Suffolk) |
| Sotterley | 113 | 6.48 | Wainford Rural District | Waveney (East Suffolk) |
| South Cove | | | Lothingland Rural District | Waveney (East Suffolk) |
| Southolt | | | Hartismere Rural District | Mid Suffolk |
| Southwold (town) | 1,098 | 2.68 | Southwold Municipal Borough | Waveney (East Suffolk) |
| Spexhall | 192 | 7.80 | Wainford Rural District | Waveney (East Suffolk) |
| St Andrew, Ilketshall | 291 | 6.95 | Wainford Rural District | Waveney (East Suffolk) |
| St Cross, South Elmham | 217 | 7.7 | Wainford Rural District | Waveney (East Suffolk) |
| St James, South Elmham | 205 | 5.32 | Wainford Rural District | Waveney (East Suffolk) |
| St John, Ilketshall | | | Wainford Rural District | Waveney (East Suffolk) |
| St Lawrence, Ilketshall | 158 | 4.77 | Wainford Rural District | Waveney (East Suffolk) |
| St Margaret, Ilketshall | 209 | 11.54 | Wainford Rural District | Waveney (East Suffolk) |
| St Margaret, South Elmham | | | Wainford Rural District | Waveney (East Suffolk) |
| St Michael, South Elmham | | | Wainford Rural District | Waveney (East Suffolk) |
| St Peter, South Elmham | | | Wainford Rural District | Waveney (East Suffolk) |
| Stansfield | 221 | 7.76 | Clare Rural District | St Edmundsbury (West Suffolk) |
| Stanton | 2,507 | 16.33 | Thingoe Rural District | St Edmundsbury (West Suffolk) |
| Sternfield | 132 | 4.21 | Blyth Rural District | Suffolk Coastal |
| Stoke Ash | 314 | 7.92 | Hartismere Rural District | Mid Suffolk |
| Stoke-by-Clare | 512 | 9.89 | Clare Rural District | St Edmundsbury (West Suffolk) |
| Stonham Aspal | 601 | 9.97 | Gipping Rural District | Mid Suffolk |
| Stonham Parva | 399 | 4.91 | Gipping Rural District | Mid Suffolk |
| Stowlangtoft | 228 | 5.98 | Thedwastre Rural District | Mid Suffolk |
| Stowmarket (town) | 19,280 | 7.56 | Stowmarket Urban District | Mid Suffolk |
| Stowupland | 1,988 | 9.93 | Gipping Rural District | Mid Suffolk |
| Stradbroke | 1,408 | 15.35 | Hartismere Rural District | Mid Suffolk |
| Stradishall | 451 | 5.69 | Clare Rural District | St Edmundsbury (West Suffolk) |
| Stratford St Andrew | 185 | 3.24 | Blyth Rural District | Suffolk Coastal |
| Stratton Hall | | | Deben Rural District | Suffolk Coastal |
| Stuston | 194 | 3.25 | Hartismere Rural District | Mid Suffolk |
| Sudbourne | 309 | 19.58 | Deben Rural District | Suffolk Coastal |
| Sutton Heath | | | | Suffolk Coastal |
| Sutton | 1,804 | 22.47 | Deben Rural District | Suffolk Coastal |
| Swefling | 187 | 4.58 | Blyth Rural District | Suffolk Coastal |
| Swilland | 163 | 3.88 | Deben Rural District | Suffolk Coastal |
| Syleham | 180 | 6.53 | Hartismere Rural District | Mid Suffolk |
| Tannington | | | Hartismere Rural District | Mid Suffolk |
| The Saxhams | 286 | 11.21 | Thingoe Rural District | St Edmundsbury (West Suffolk) |
| Theberton | 279 | 10.49 | Blyth Rural District | Suffolk Coastal |
| Thelnetham | 254 | 7.78 | Thingoe Rural District | St Edmundsbury (West Suffolk) |
| Thorington | | | Blyth Rural District | Suffolk Coastal |
| Thorndon | 648 | 11.01 | Hartismere Rural District | Mid Suffolk |
| Thornham Magna | 210 | 8.27 | Hartismere Rural District | Mid Suffolk |
| Thornham Parva | | | Hartismere Rural District | Mid Suffolk |
| Thrandeston | 146 | 5.62 | Hartismere Rural District | Mid Suffolk |
| Thurston | 3,232 | 8.61 | Thedwastre Rural District | Mid Suffolk |
| Thwaite | 149 | 3.38 | Hartismere Rural District | Mid Suffolk |
| Timworth | | | Thingoe Rural District | St Edmundsbury (West Suffolk) |
| Tostock | 472 | 4.18 | Thedwastre Rural District | Mid Suffolk |
| Trimley St Martin | 1,942 | 9.30 | Deben Rural District | Suffolk Coastal |
| Trimley St Mary | 3,665 | 6.67 | Deben Rural District | Suffolk Coastal |
| Troston | 952 | 7.32 | Thingoe Rural District | St Edmundsbury (West Suffolk) |
| Tuddenham St Martin | 353 | 5.15 | Deben Rural District | Suffolk Coastal |
| Tunstall | 513 | 11.28 | Deben Rural District | Suffolk Coastal |
| Ubbeston | | | Blyth Rural District | Suffolk Coastal |
| Ufford | 948 | 4.70 | Deben Rural District | Suffolk Coastal |
| Uggeshall | 145 | 6.05 | Lothingland Rural District | Waveney (East Suffolk) |
| Walberswick | 380 | 7.89 | Blyth Rural District | Suffolk Coastal |
| Waldringfield | 464 | 3.76 | Deben Rural District | Suffolk Coastal |
| Walpole | 238 | 6.78 | Blyth Rural District | Suffolk Coastal |
| Walsham-le-Willows | 1,213 | 11.40 | Thedwastre Rural District | Mid Suffolk |
| Wangford with Henham | 591 | 10.95 | Lothingland Rural District | Waveney (East Suffolk) |
| Wantisden | | | Deben Rural District | Suffolk Coastal |
| Wattisfield | 475 | 6.19 | Thedwastre Rural District | Mid Suffolk |
| Wenhaston with Mells Hamlet | 801 | 9.72 | Blyth Rural District | Suffolk Coastal |
| West Stow | 174 | 21.29 | Thingoe Rural District | St Edmundsbury (West Suffolk) |
| Westerfield | 442 | 3.07 | Deben Rural District | Suffolk Coastal |
| Westhall | 342 | 9.39 | Wainford Rural District | Waveney (East Suffolk) |
| Westhorpe | 208 | 5.42 | Hartismere Rural District | Mid Suffolk |
| Westleton | 349 | 2.29 | Blyth Rural District | Suffolk Coastal |
| Westley | 183 | 3.92 | Thingoe Rural District | St Edmundsbury (West Suffolk) |
| Weston | 257 | 10.84 | Wainford Rural District | Waveney (East Suffolk) |
| Wetherden | 543 | 7.52 | Gipping Rural District | Mid Suffolk |
| Wetheringsett-cum-Brockford | 669 | 15.44 | Hartismere Rural District | Mid Suffolk |
| Weybread | 432 | 10.14 | Hartismere Rural District | Mid Suffolk |
| Whepstead | 422 | 11.11 | Thingoe Rural District | St Edmundsbury (West Suffolk) |
| Whitton | 168 | 5.52 | Gipping Rural District | Mid Suffolk |
| Wickham Market | 2,156 | 4.81 | Deben Rural District | Suffolk Coastal |
| Wickham Skeith | 321 | 7.22 | Hartismere Rural District | Mid Suffolk |
| Wickhambrook | 1,191 | 17.54 | Clare Rural District | St Edmundsbury (West Suffolk) |
| Wilby | 239 | 8.63 | Hartismere Rural District | Mid Suffolk |
| Willingham St Mary | 152 | 4.17 | Wainford Rural District | Waveney (East Suffolk) |
| Willisham | 362 | 7.83 | Gipping Rural District | Mid Suffolk |
| Wingfield | 345 | 10.10 | Hartismere Rural District | Mid Suffolk |
| Winston | 159 | 6.10 | Gipping Rural District | Mid Suffolk |
| Wissett | 268 | 8.43 | Wainford Rural District | Waveney (East Suffolk) |
| Withersfield | 450 | 9.72 | Clare Rural District | St Edmundsbury (West Suffolk) |
| Witnesham | 792 | 8.28 | Deben Rural District | Suffolk Coastal |
| Wixoe | 145 | 2.27 | Clare Rural District | St Edmundsbury (West Suffolk) |
| Woodbridge (town) | 7,749 | 4.68 | Woodbridge Urban District | Suffolk Coastal |
| Woolpit | 1,995 | 7.48 | Thedwastre Rural District | Mid Suffolk |
| Wordwell | | | Thingoe Rural District | St Edmundsbury (West Suffolk) |
| Worlingham | 3,745 | 6.76 | Wainford Rural District | Waveney (East Suffolk) |
| Worlingworth | 802 | 10.01 | Hartismere Rural District | Mid Suffolk |
| Wortham | 722 | 11.09 | Hartismere Rural District | Mid Suffolk |
| Wrentham | 966 | 9.44 | Lothingland Rural District | Waveney (East Suffolk) |
| Wyverstone | 396 | 6.23 | Hartismere Rural District | Mid Suffolk |
| Yaxley | 588 | 5.08 | Hartismere Rural District | Mid Suffolk |
| Yoxford | 726 | 11.09 | Blyth Rural District | Suffolk Coastal |

== See also ==
- List of civil parishes in England
