= Deben Rural District =

Rural district in East Suffolk, England

Coordinates: 52.1°N 1.4°E

Deben
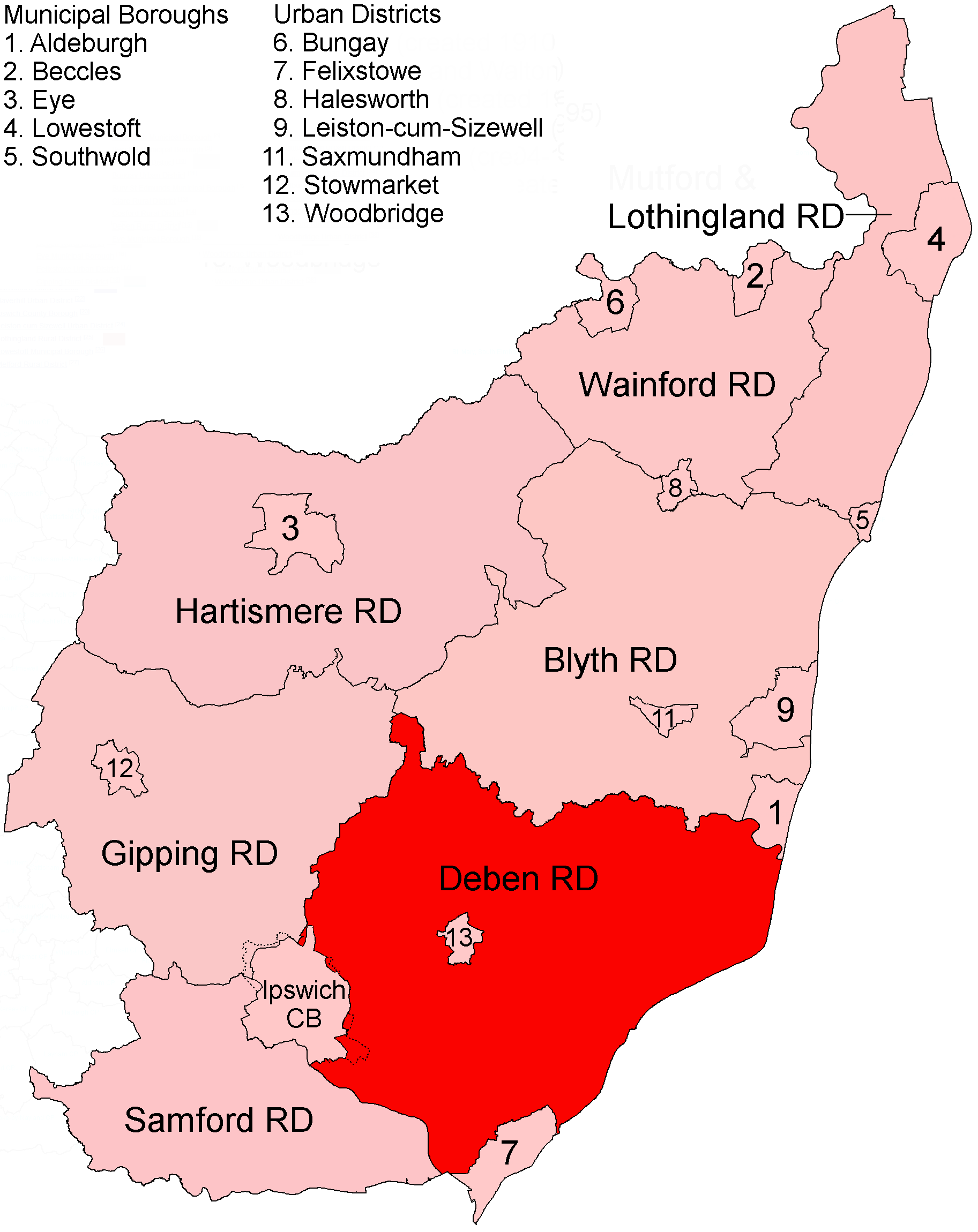
- Location within East Suffolk, 1934
- History
  - Created: 1934
  - Abolished: 1974
  - Succeeded by: Suffolk Coastal
- Status: Rural district
  - HQ: Woodbridge

Deben Rural District was a rural district in the county of East Suffolk, England. It was created in 1934 by the merger of parts of the disbanded Bosmere and Claydon Rural District, the disbanded Plomesgate Rural District and the disbanded Woodbridge Rural District, under a County Review Order. It was named after the River Deben and administered from Woodbridge.

Its area was reduced slightly in 1952 by an expansion of the county borough of Ipswich.

On 1 April 1974, it was abolished under the Local Government Act 1972, and has since formed part of the District of Suffolk Coastal.

== Statistics ==
Year	Area		Population	Density (pop/ha)
Year	acres	ha	Population	Density (pop/ha)
1951	109,978	44,507	27,505	0.62
1961	109,310	44,237	32,309	0.73

== Parishes ==
At the time of its dissolution it consisted of the following 66 civil parishes.

1. Alderton
2. Bawdsey
3. Blaxhall
4. Boulge
5. Boyton
6. Bredfield
7. Brightwell
8. Bromeswell
9. Bucklesham
10. Burgh
11. Butley
12. Campsea Ashe
13. Capel St. Andrew
14. Charsfield
15. Chillesford
16. Clopton
17. Cretingham
18. Culpho
19. Dallinghoo
20. Dallinghoo Wield
21. Debach
22. Eyke
23. Falkenham
24. Foxhall
25. Gedgrave
26. Great Bealings
27. Grundisburgh
28. Hasketon
29. Havergate Island
30. Hemley
31. Hollesley
32. Hoo
33. Iken
34. Kesgrave
35. Kirton
36. Letheringham
37. Levington
38. Little Bealings
39. Martlesham
40. Melton
41. Monewden
42. Nacton
43. Newbourn
44. Orford
45. Otley
46. Pettistree
47. Playford
48. Purdis Farm
49. Ramsholt
50. Rendlesham
51. Rushmere St. Andrew
52. Shottisham
53. Stratton Hall
54. Sudbourne
55. Sutton
56. Swilland
57. Trimley St. Martin
58. Trimley St. Mary
59. Tuddenham St. Martin
60. Tunstall
61. Ufford
62. Waldringfield
63. Wantisden
64. Westerfield
65. Wickham Market
66. Witnesham
