= Thingoe Rural District =

Former rural district in West Suffolk, England

Coordinates: 52.22°N 0.63°E

Thingoe
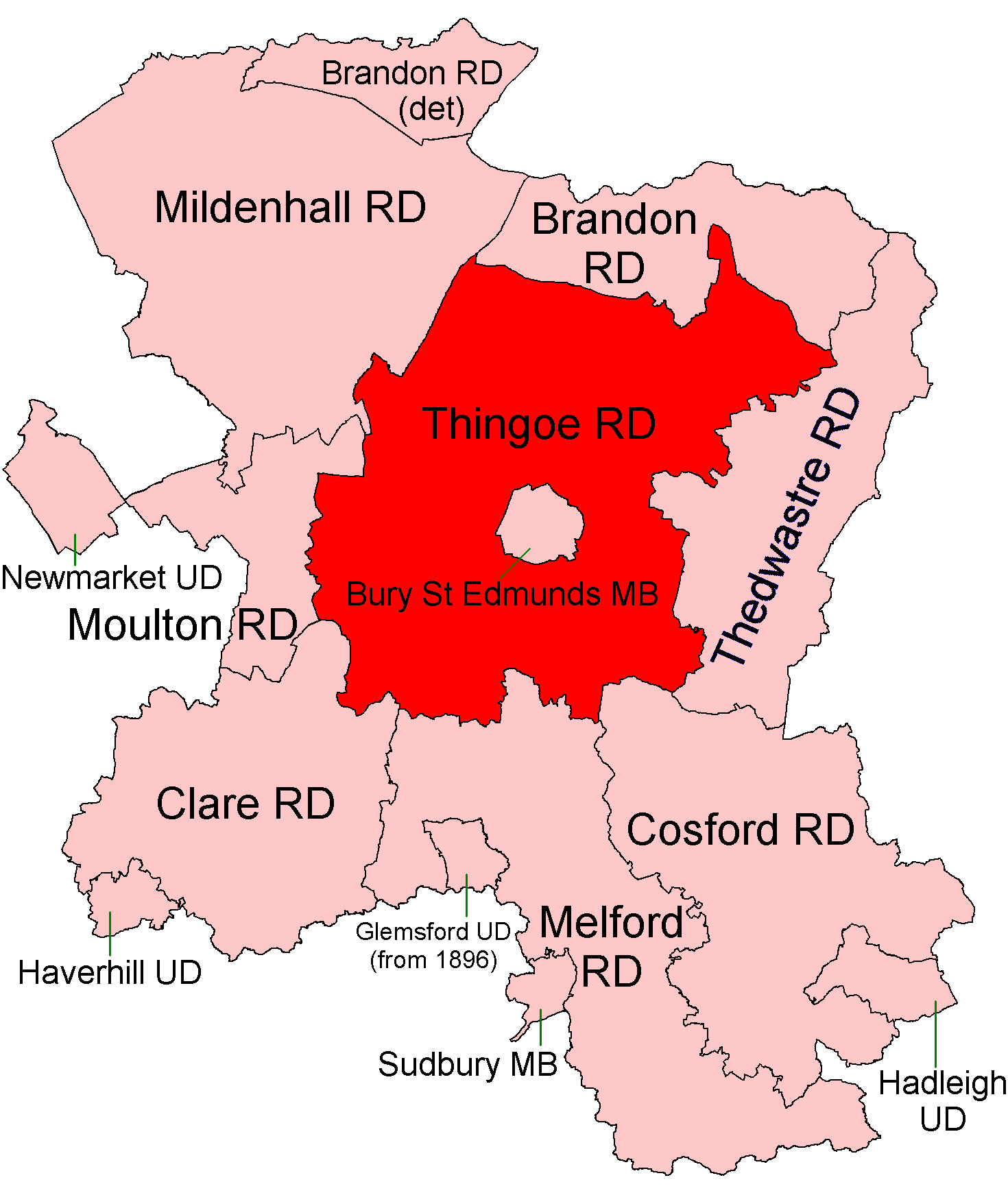
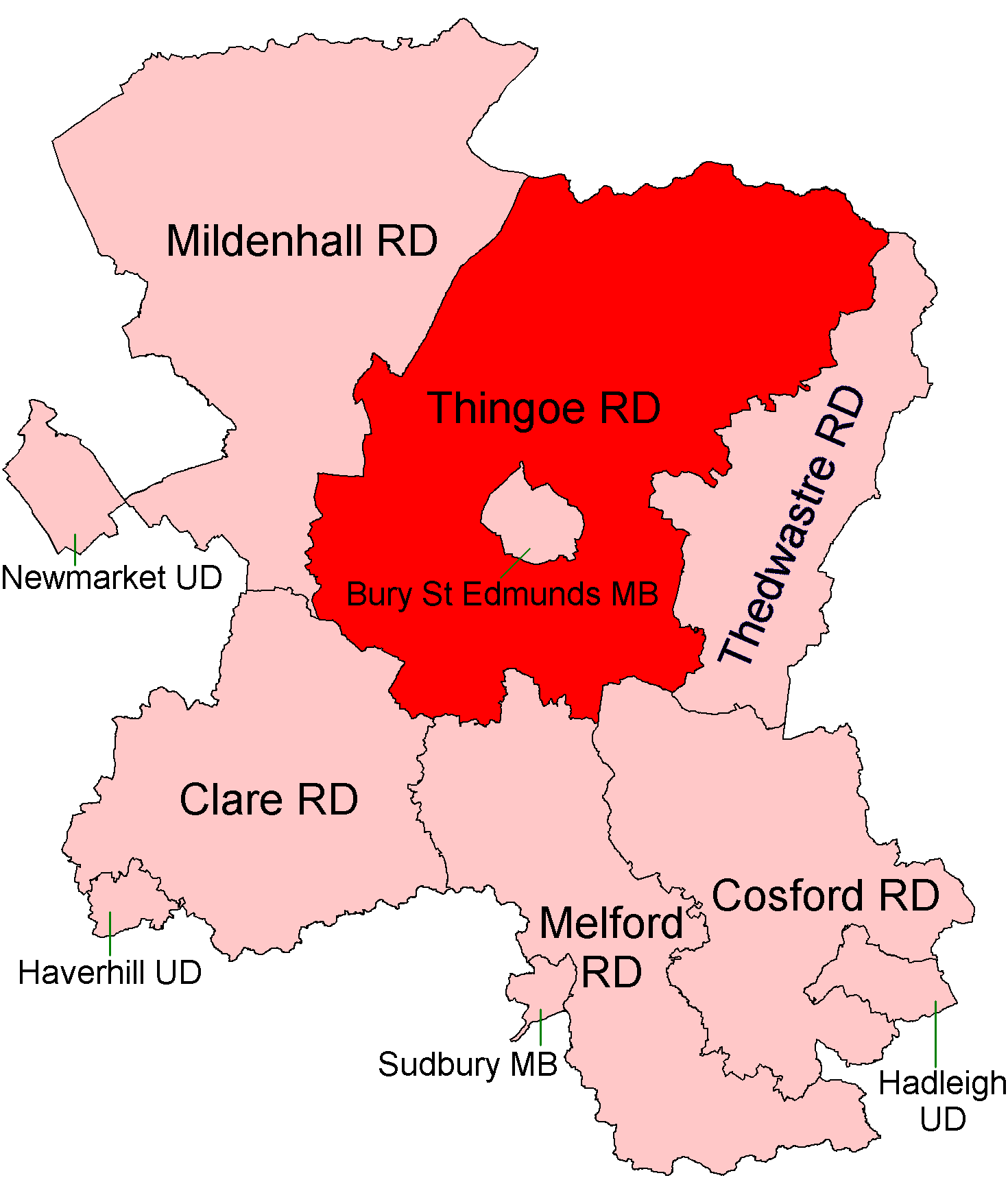
- Location within West Suffolk, 1894 Location within West Suffolk, 1935
- History
  - Created: 1894
  - Abolished: 1974
  - Succeeded by: St Edmundsbury Borough
- Status: Rural district
  - HQ: Bury St Edmunds

Thingoe Rural District was a rural district in the county of West Suffolk, England between 1894 and 1974. It was named after the ancient Hundred of Thingoe ("thing-hoe" – "assembly-mound") and administered from Bury St Edmunds, which it surrounded.

== History ==
The district had its origins in the Thingoe Poor Law Union, which had been created in 1836 under the Poor Law Amendment Act 1834. The 1834 act transferred responsibilities under the poor laws from individual parishes to unions of many parishes, able to fund a large central workhouse for the area. The Thingoe union covered numerous parishes surrounding Bury St Edmunds, but did not include the town itself, which already ran its own workhouse under the Bury Saint Edmunds (Poor Relief) Act 1747 (21 Geo. 2. c. 21) and so was exempted from being included in a poor law union under the 1834 act. Whilst the Thingoe union did not include Bury St Edmunds, the board of guardians for the union chose to build the Thingoe Union Workhouse there as a central and accessible location for all the parishes in the Thingoe union; the workhouse was built on Mill Lane in 1836. The Thingoe union took its name from the ancient hundred, which had covered some of the area.

In 1872 sanitary districts were established, giving public health and local government responsibilities for rural areas to the existing boards of guardians of poor law unions. Rural sanitary districts were converted into rural districts with elected councils under the Local Government Act 1894.

On 1 April 1935 the parish of Depden was transferred to the Clare Rural District. On the same date the district was enlarged by the transfer of the civil parishes of Barnham, Barningham, Coney Weston, Euston, Fakenham Magna, Hepworth, Honington, Hopton, Knettishall, Market Weston, Sapiston, and Thelnetham from the disbanded Brandon Rural District.

The district was abolished in 1974 under the Local Government Act 1972. The area became part of the borough of St Edmundsbury, which in turn became part of West Suffolk district in 2019.

== Parishes ==
At the time of its dissolution it consisted of the following 58 parishes.

1. Ampton
2. Bardwell
3. Barnham
4. Barningham
5. Barrow
6. Bradfield Combust
7. Bradfield St Clare
8. Bradfield St George
9. Brockley
10. Chedburgh
11. Chevington
12. Coney Weston
13. Culford
14. Denham St Mary
15. Euston
16. Fakenham Magna
17. Flempton
18. Fornham All Saints
19. Fornham St Genevieve
20. Fornham St Martin
21. Great Barton
22. Great Livermere
23. Great Saxham
24. Great Whelnetham
25. Hardwick
26. Hargrave
27. Hawstead
28. Hengrave
29. Hepworth
30. Honington
31. Hopton
32. Horringer
33. Ickworth
34. Ingham
35. Ixworth Thorpe
36. Ixworth
37. Knettishall
38. Lackford
39. Little Livermere
40. Little Saxham
41. Little Whelnetham
42. Market Weston
43. Nowton
44. Pakenham
45. Rede
46. Risby
47. Rushbrooke
48. Rougham
49. Sapiston
50. Stanningfield
51. Stanton
52. Thelnetham
53. Timworth
54. Troston
55. West Stow
56. Westley
57. Whepstead
58. Wordwell

== Statistics ==
Year	Area		Population	Density (pop/ha)
Year	acres	ha	Population	Density (pop/ha)
1911	83,998	33,993	14,439	0.42
1921	83,998	33,993	13,397	0.39
1931	83,998	33,993	12,878	0.38
1951	106,739	43,196	17,266	0.40
1961	106,738	43,196	20,021	0.46

== Premises ==
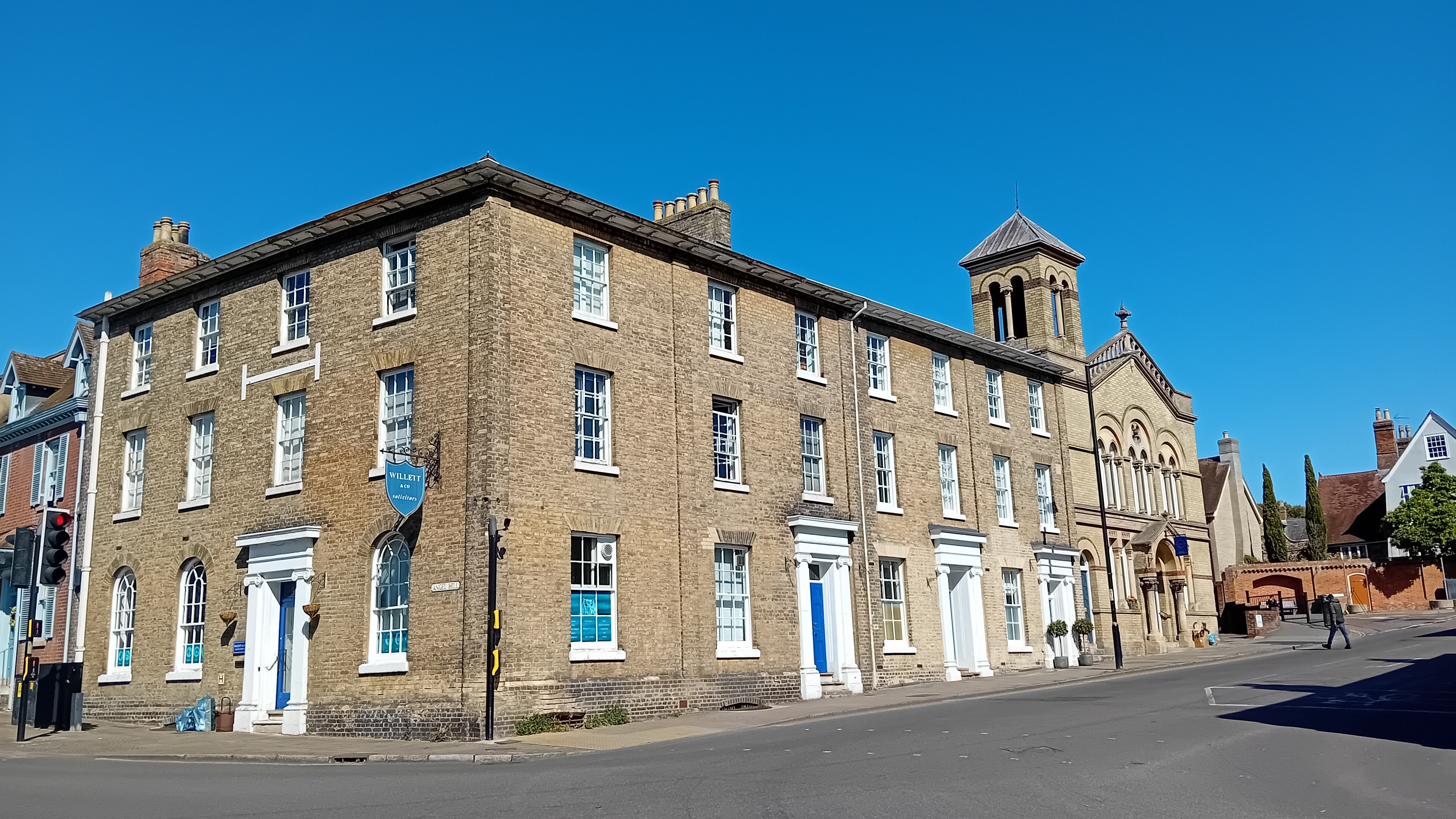
Council's former offices at 1 Northgate Street, Bury St Edmunds

Throughout its existence, the council was based outside its administrative area, in the neighbouring town of Bury St Edmunds, which the district encircled. In the early years, the council met at the board room at the Thingoe Union Workhouse on Mill Lane, reflecting the district's origins in the Thingoe poor law union. By the 1950s the council was based at 1 Northgate Street, remaining there until the council's abolition in 1974.
