= Thedwastre Rural District =

Former rural district in West Suffolk, England

Coordinates: 52.24°N 0.89°E

Thedwastre
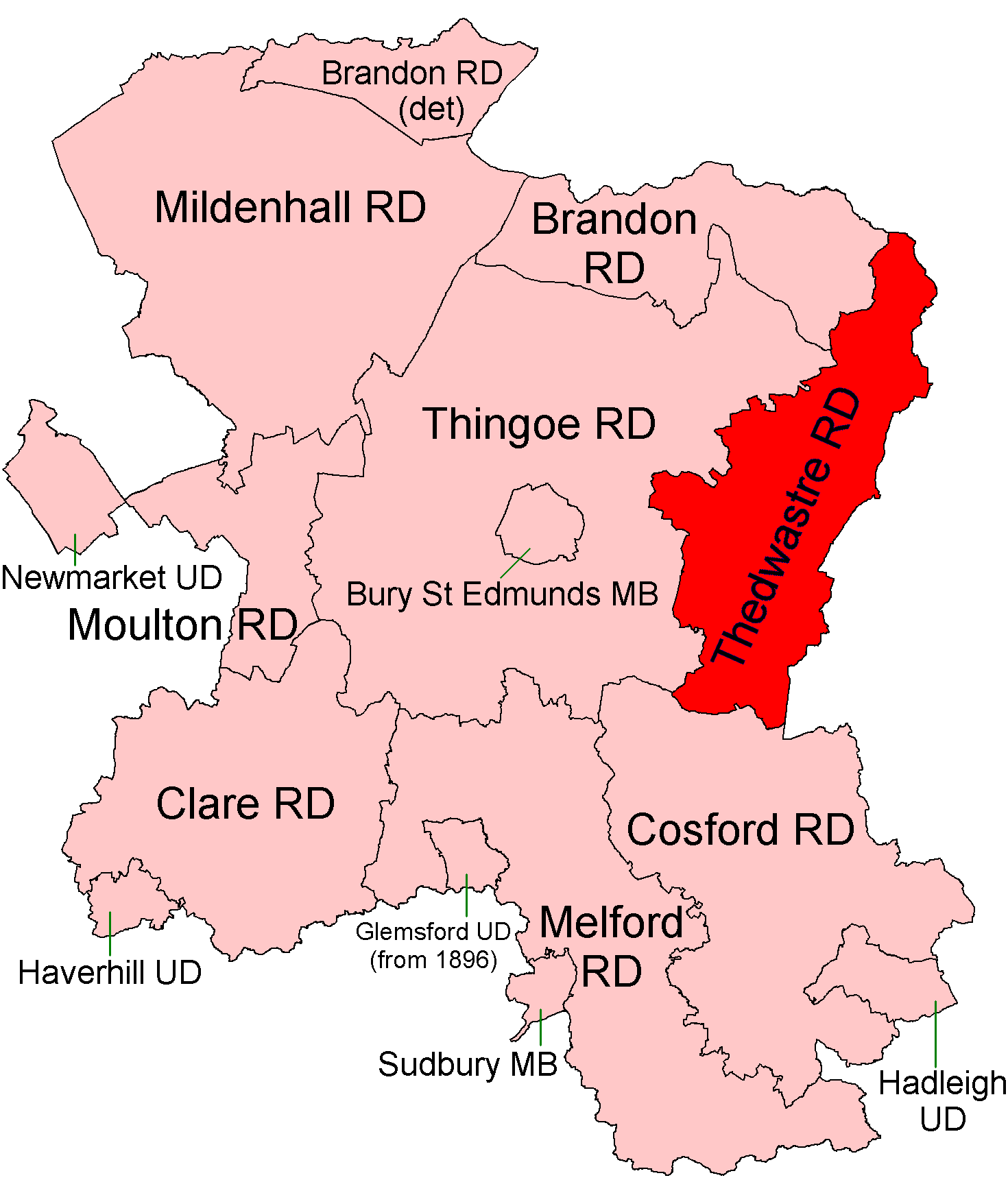
- Location within West Suffolk, 1894
- Area
  - 1901: 34,126 acres (138.1 km²)
  - 1971: 34,126 acres (138.1 km²)
- Population
  - 1901: 9,075
  - 1971: 10,692
- History
  - Created: 28 December 1894
  - Abolished: 31 March 1974
- Status: Rural district
  - HQ: Stowmarket (1895–1959); Elmswell (1959–1974)

Thedwastre was a rural district in West Suffolk, England from 1894 to 1974. Thedwastre was formed under the Local Government Act 1894, from the part of the Stow Rural Sanitary District which was in West Suffolk (the rest forming East Stow Rural District in East Suffolk). It was named after the historic hundred of Thedwastre.

The district was abolished in 1974, under the Local Government Act 1972, and went to form part of the Mid Suffolk district in Suffolk. Its boundaries never changed during its 80 years existence.

== Parishes ==
The rural district comprised the following civil parishes:

1. Badwell Ash
2. Beyton
3. Drinkstone
4. Elmswell
5. Felsham
6. Gedding
7. Great Ashfield
8. Hessett
9. Hinderclay
10. Hunston
11. Langham
12. Norton
13. Rattlesden
14. Rickinghall Inferior
15. Stowlangtoft
16. Thurston
17. Tostock
18. Walsham le Willows
19. Wattisfield
20. Woolpit

== Statistics ==
Year	Area		Population	Density (pop/ha)
Year	acres	ha	Population	Density (pop/ha)
1911	34,126	13,810	9,018	0.65
1921	34,126	13,810	8,492	0.61
1931	34,126	13,810	8,039	0.58
1951	34,126	13,810	8,870	0.64
1961	34,126	13,810	9,270	0.67

== Premises ==
The council held its first meeting on 10 January 1895 at the Stow Union Workhouse in the parish of Onehouse, just outside Stowmarket. Hervey Aston Oakes was appointed the council's first chairman, and it was decided that subsequent meetings would be held at the courthouse in Stowmarket.

The council remained based in Stowmarket (and therefore outside its administrative area) until 1959, when it moved to purpose-built premises on Cooks Road in Elmswell. The council remained based at Elmswell until its abolition in 1974. The council's former offices were subsequently converted into retirement housing and renamed Manns Court.
