= Brandon Rural District =

Former rural district in Suffolk, England

Coordinates: 52.38°N 0.74°E

Brandon
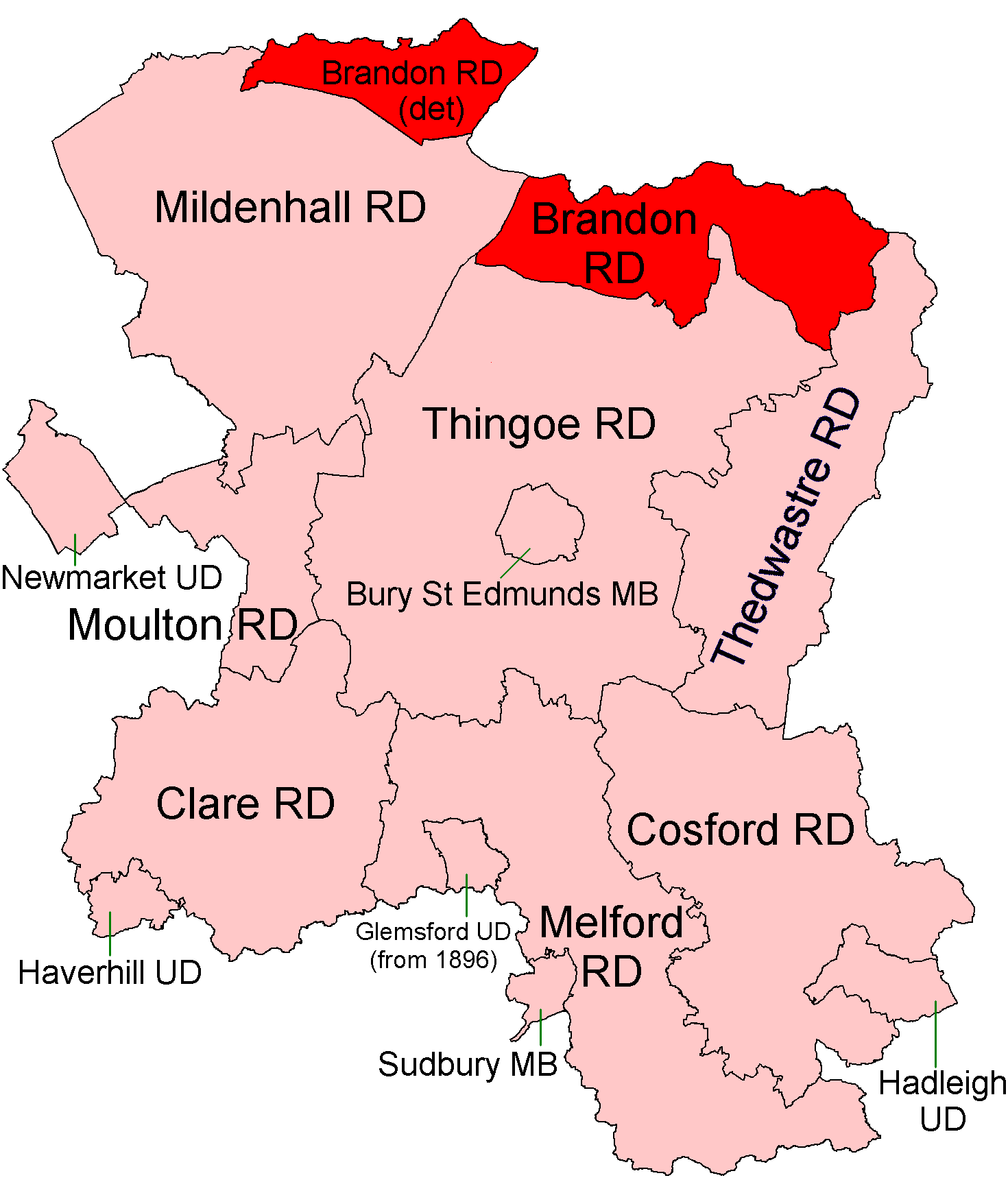
- Location within West Suffolk, 1894
- History
  - Created: 1894
  - Abolished: 1935
  - Succeeded by: Thingoe & Mildenhall RDs
- Status: Rural district

Brandon was a rural district in Suffolk, England from 1894 to 1935. The district was created in 1894 as the Suffolk part of the Thetford rural sanitary district, the Norfolk part becoming Thetford Rural District. This left the westernmost parishes of Brandon and Santon Downham detached from the rest of the district.

It was abolished in 1935 and the main section of the district (the parishes of Barnham, Barningham, Coney Weston, Euston, Fakenham Magna, Hepworth, Honington, Hopton, Knettishall, Market Weston, Sapiston and Thelnetham) became part of Thingoe Rural District, which in 1974 became part of the modern Borough of St Edmundsbury. The two western parishes became part of Mildenhall Rural District in 1935, and are now in neighbouring Forest Heath district and then from 1st April 2019 onwards West Suffolk district.

== Statistics ==
Year	Area		Population	Density (pop/ha)
Year	acres	ha	Population	Density (pop/ha)
1911	35,760	14,472	8,311	0.57
1921	35,760	14,472	7,990	0.55
1931	35,760	14,472	7,815	0.54
