= Monks Risbridge =

Former civil parish in Suffolk, England

Coordinates: 52.126981°N 0.50268888°E

- Location within Suffolk
- Civil parish: Barnardiston
- District: West Suffolk
- Shire county: Suffolk
- Region: East
- Country: England
- Sovereign state: United Kingdom

Monks Risbridge is a former civil parish now in the parish of Barnardiston, in the West Suffolk district, in the county of Suffolk, England. In 1971 the parish had a population of 0.

== History ==
The name "Risbridge" means 'Brushwood bridge'. Monks Risbridge was an extra-parochial area, it became a civil parish in 1858. In 1889 it became part of the administrative county of West Suffolk, in 1894 it became part of Clare Rural District. In 1974 it became part of the non-metropolitan district of St Edmundsbury in the non-metropolitan county of Suffolk. On 1 April 1988 the parish was abolished and merged with Barnardiston. In 2019 the area became part of West Suffolk district.

Monks Risbridge was given by Thomas de Woodstock, Earl of Buckingham and Duke of Gloucester to Pleshy College.
