= Barnardiston =

Village in Suffolk, England

Coordinates: 52.111°N 0.498°E

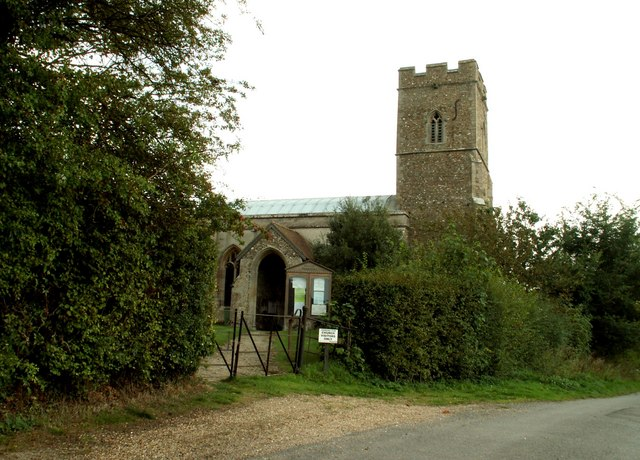
- All Saints church, Barnardiston

- Location within Suffolk
- Interactive map of Barnardiston
- Population: 168 (2011 census)
- OS grid reference: TL710480
- Civil parish: Barnardiston
- District: West Suffolk
- Shire county: Suffolk
- Region: East
- Country: England
- Sovereign state: United Kingdom
- Post town: Haverhill
- Postcode district: CB9
- Dialling code: 01440
- UK Parliament: West Suffolk

Barnardiston (/bɑːrnərˈdɪstən/ bar-nər-DIS-tən) is a village and parish in the West Suffolk district of Suffolk, England. The village is located about four miles north-east of Haverhill off the A143. In 2011 the parish had a population of 168.

== History ==
The name has an older form Bernardeston, which means 'farmstead of a man called Beornheard'. Prior to the mid-eighteenth century it is often listed as "Barnardiston otherwise Chilbourne", and it is listed as Cileburna in the Domesday Book. The Earl Ralph's holdings, which Goodrich the Steward held in the King's possession in Suffolk, are included in the first Domesday document. That was only a socman with 30 acres. There were a bordar, a ploughteam, and 6 acres of meadow, formerly valued at ten shillings. Then at twenty shillings. The other Domesday listing is part of the great possessions of Richard, son of Earl Gislebert. Goodwin, a freeman, held 2 carucates of land, 1 villein, 4 bordars, formerly 2 ploughteams but then one only, 6 acres of meadow, one mill, and one rouncy. The value had been forty shillings, but was then fifty shillings. Geoffrey, son of Hamon, then held over Goodwin.

In 1889 it became part of the administrative county of West Suffolk, in 1894 it became part of Clare Rural District. In 1974 it became part of the non-metropolitan district of St Edmundsbury in the non-metropolitan county of Suffolk. On 1 April 1988 the parish of Monks Risbridge was abolished and merged with Barnardiston.

== Barnardiston Church ==
All Saints church is in the centre of Barnardiston. The church was built before the thirteenth century (according to English Heritage the chancel is thirteenth century but the nave is of earlier origin). It is situated in the South West corner of the outer enclosure of the medieval manor (see below). Barnardiston Parish forms part of the Stourhead Benefice, sharing a Rector with Kedington, Little Wratting, Great Wratting, Little Thurlow, Great Thurlow, Little Bradley and Great Bradley. Records of a Rector at Barnardiston go well back into the sixteenth century with Thomas Dyeson being the earliest recorded holder in 1555. Between 1815 and around 1860 Barnardiston shared a Rector with Hundon, having only a stipendary curate, but again for around a century from 1860 it had its own Rector and rectory for a population of less than a hundred, before the present arrangements began.

== Barnardiston Manor ==
Barnardiston is also the location of two of only 32 scheduled ancient monuments in Suffolk, the moats and carp pond of a medieval manor. The manor itself was not listed separately in the Domesday book but its moats and carp-pond are scheduled as being dated prior to 1150 AD. The manor was not present on the 1850 enclosure map, which shows another building, probably a previous rectory, outside the moats in the outer enclosure adjacent to the church.

According to Walter Copinger's Manors of Suffolk,

"the manor was certainly held by Alexander de Walpole, with evidence from 1312 of a fine levied whereby this Alexander de Walpole, son and heir of Walter de Barnardiston, granted the manor with the advowson to Margery "Wileghby", and Thomas de Barnardiston her son. It was "probably" therefore held by his great-grandfather A. de Barnardiston in the time of Richard I (1189-1199), then by his grandfather Simon de Barnardiston, and then by his father Walter de Barnardiston. The Thomas de Barnardiston to whom the manor was granted in 1312 shared the same great-grandfather as Alexander be Walpole but his grandfather was William, the brother of the Simon de Barnardiston above-mentioned. Alexander de Walpole had a grant of free warren in Barnardiston Manor in 1347, and presented to the church in 1332 and 1349.

Amongst the Harleian Charters in the British Museum is a grant of seisin of the manor in 1397. A fine was levied of part of the manor and also of Kedington Manor by Sir John Bussy, Sir John Leek, and Sir John de Birton against Sir Edmund Perponnte and Francisa his wife. In 1403 there is the record of a fine levied of the manor by Sir Thomas Hawley and others against Roger de Barnardiston. The manor is mentioned in the inquest into the death of Sir Thomas Barnardiston in 1542. Amongst the Harleian manuscripts is a surrender of the manor by Sir John Cheke to Queen Mary I, rated for Francis Knighton 31 May 1557."

No written record of the Barnardiston manor existing as a building has been found after 1557. Today the moats and carp pond form part of private gardens.

== Present day ==
Barnardiston Hall boarding school, a mile away from the village, used to be the old village hall and farm buildings. It has 250 pupils.

Tour of Britain 2010 Stage 7 went close to the village.
