= Clare Rural District =

Former local government area in the UK

Coordinates: 52.14°N 0.54°E

Clare
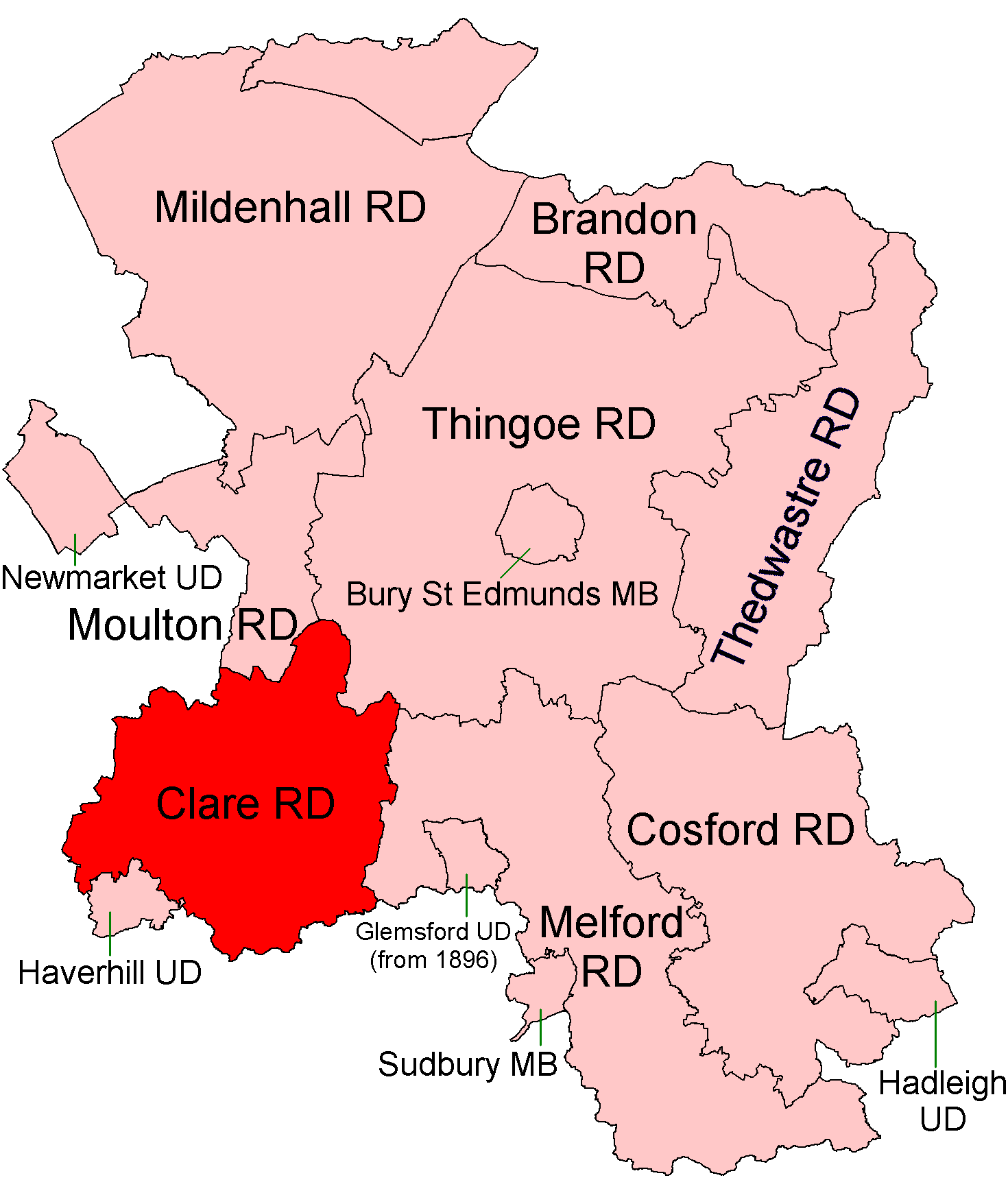
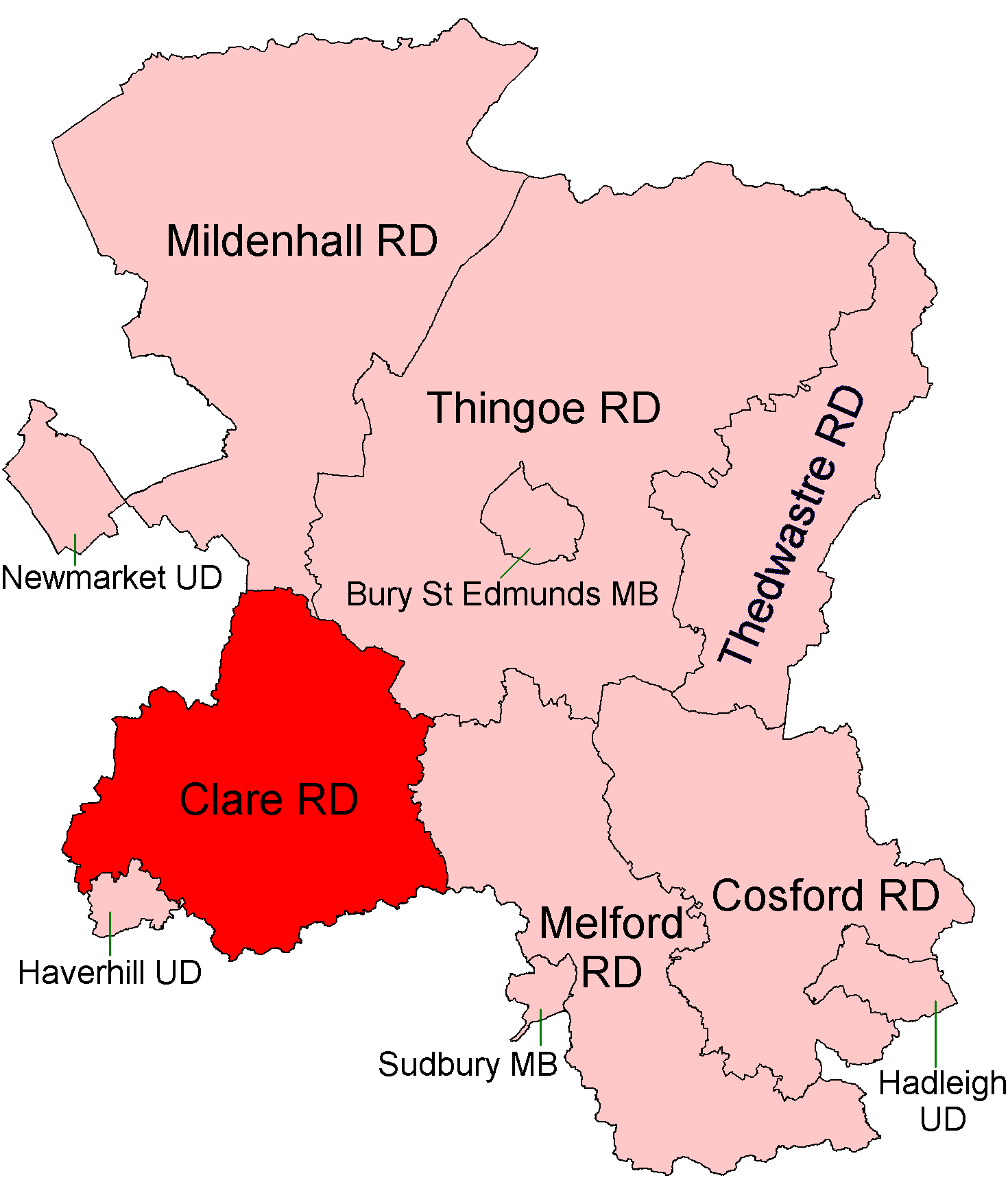
- Location within West Suffolk, 1894 Location within West Suffolk, 1935
- History
  - Created: 1894
  - Abolished: 1974
  - Succeeded by: Borough of St Edmundsbury
- Status: Rural district
  - HQ: Clare

Clare Rural District was a rural district in the county of West Suffolk, England. It was created by the Local Government Act 1894, comprising those parishes in the Risbridge rural sanitary district which were in Suffolk.

On 1 April 1935 it was enlarged by the addition of the parishes of Lidgate and Ousden from the disbanded Moulton Rural District, Cavendish and Hawkedon from the Melford Rural District and Depden from the Thingoe Rural District. It was named after and administered from Clare.

Since 1 April 1974 it has formed part of the borough of St Edmundsbury which became West Suffolk district in 2019.

== Parishes ==
Parish	From	Notes
Barnardiston		
Cavendish	1935	From Melford RD
Clare		
Cowlinge		
Denston		
Depden	1935	From Thingoe RD
Great Bradley		
Great Thurlow		
Great Wratting		
Hawkedon	1935	From Melford RD
Hundon		
Kedington		
Lidgate	1935	From Moulton RD
Little Bradley		
Little Thurlow		
Little Wratting		
Monks Risbridge		
Ousden	1935	From Moulton RD
Poslingford		
Stansfield		
Stoke by Clare		
Stradishall		
Wickhambrook		
Withersfield		
Wixoe		

== Statistics ==
Year	Area		Population	Density (pop/ha)
Year	acres	ha	Population	Density (pop/ha)
1911	39,522	15,994	8,567	0.54
1921	39,522	15,994	7,348	0.46
1931	39,522	15,994	6,958	0.44
1951	49,360	19,975	9,413	0.47
1961	49,360	19,975	8,828	0.44
