= West Suffolk (county) =

English administrative county (1889–1974)

Coordinates: 52.2500°N 0.7167°E

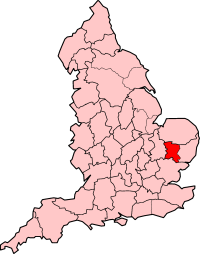
- Area
  - 1911: 390,916 acres (1,581.98 km^{2})
  - 1961: 390,915 acres (1,581.98 km^{2})
- Population
  - 1901: 117,553
  - 1971: 164,718
- History
  - Created: 1889
  - Abolished: 1974
  - Succeeded by: Suffolk
- Status: Administrative county
- Government: West Suffolk County Council
  - HQ: Bury St. Edmunds

West Suffolk was an administrative county of England created in 1889 from part of the county of Suffolk. It survived until 1974 when it was rejoined with East Suffolk. Its county town was Bury St Edmunds.

Before the introduction of county councils, Suffolk had been divided into eastern and western divisions, each with their own quarter sessions. The western division corresponded to the Liberty of Saint Edmund. This area had been established by Edward the Confessor in 1044 and was a separate jurisdiction under the control of the abbot of Bury St Edmunds Abbey until the dissolution of the monasteries.

This history was reflected in the coat of arms of the county council. The council initially adopted the attributed arms of Edward the Confessor: a cross patonce between five martlets. When the council received an official grant of arms from the College of Arms in 1959, abbots' mitres and the emblem of St Edmund: crossed arrows through an open crown were added. The motto adopted was For King, Law and People, referring to the association of Magna Carta with Bury.

Shortly before its abolition the West Suffolk County Council commissioned Elisabeth Frink to sculpt a statue of St Edmund to commemorate the end of 970 years of independent administration of the area. The statue, in the grounds of the abbey of Bury St Edmunds, was completed in 1976.

== Subdivisions ==
From 1894 the administrative county was divided into municipal boroughs, urban districts and rural districts:

- Boroughs: Bury St Edmunds, Sudbury
- Urban districts: Glemsford (created 1896, abolished 1935), Hadleigh, Haverhill, Newmarket
- Rural districts: Brandon (abolished 1935), Clare, Cosford, Melford, Mildenhall, Moulton (abolished 1935), Thedwastre, Thingoe

The rural districts were further subdivided into civil parishes.

== District Council ==
On 1 April 2019 a West Suffolk district was established by the merger of Forest Heath district and St Edmundsbury borough. The new district covers a smaller area than the pre-1974 West Suffolk county council.
