= Samford Rural District =

Former rural district in West Suffolk, England

Coordinates: 51.99°N 1.06°E

Samford
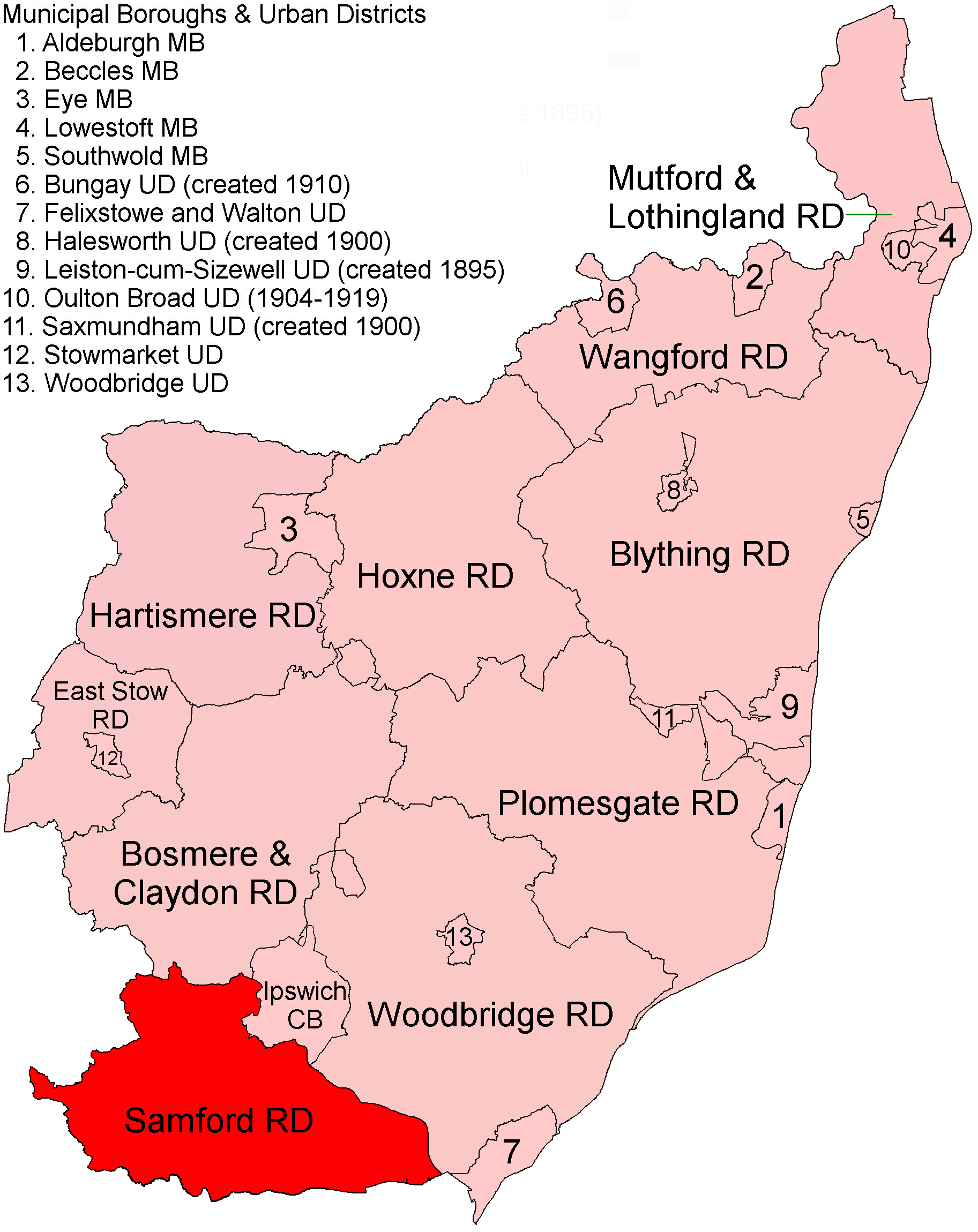
- Location within East Suffolk, 1894
- History
  - Created: 1894
  - Abolished: 1974
  - Succeeded by: Babergh
- Status: Rural district

Samford Rural District was a rural district within the administrative county of East Suffolk between 1894 and 1974. It was created out of the earlier Samford rural sanitary district. It was named after the historic hundred of Samford, whose boundaries it closely matched, containing the same parishes.

Under the East Suffolk County Review Order of 1934, the only changes made were a revision of the boundary with the county borough of Ipswich. This boundary was revised again in 1952.

Under the Local Government Act 1972, Samford Rural District was abolished in 1974, and its area became part of the district of Babergh.

== Statistics ==
Year	Area		Population	Density (pop/ha)
Year	acres	ha	Population	Density (pop/ha)
1911	45,347	18,351	13,868	0.76
1921	45,347	18,351	14,640	0.80
1931	45,347	18,351	13,931	0.76
1951	45,139	18,267	15,324	0.84
1961	45,030	18,223	14,509	0.80

== Parishes ==
Samford Rural District contained the following parishes:

OS Map (1946)	Parish	Area (acres)
	Belstead	1012
	Bentley	2801
	Brantham	1922
	Burstall	766
	Capel St Mary	1910
	Chattisham	714
	Chelmondiston	1293
	Copdock	932
	East Bergholt	3064
	Erwarton	1318
	Freston	1414
	Great Wenham	1108
	Harkstead	1727
	Higham	863
	Hintlesham	2828
	Holbrook	2203
	Holton St Mary	810
	Little Wenham	970
	Raydon	2335
	Shelley	928
	Shotley	2051
	Sproughton	2380
	Stratford St Mary	1432
	Stutton	2138
	Tattingstone	1637
	Washbrook	1414
	Wherstead	2019
	Woolverstone	951
