= Gedding =

Village in Suffolk, England

Coordinates: 52.18483°N 0.85410°E

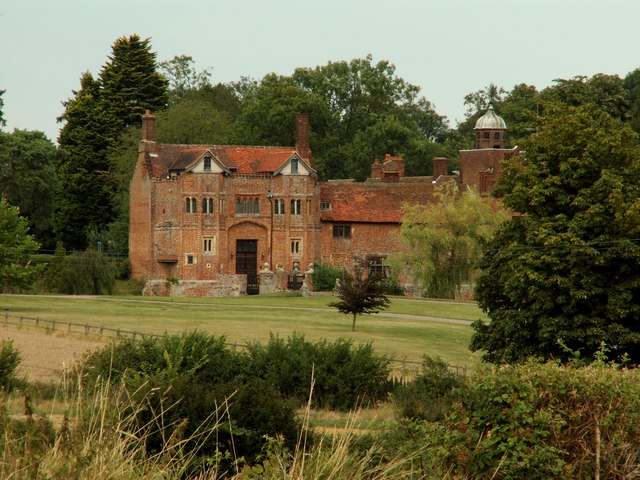
- Gedding Hall

- Location within Suffolk
- Area: 2.00 km^{2} (0.77 sq mi)
- Population: 125 (2011)
  - Density: 63/km^{2} (160/sq mi)
- OS grid reference: TL950580
- District: Mid Suffolk
- Shire county: Suffolk
- Region: East
- Country: England
- Sovereign state: United Kingdom
- Post town: Bury St Edmunds
- Postcode district: IP30
- Police: Suffolk
- Fire: Suffolk
- Ambulance: East of England
- UK Parliament: Bury St Edmunds and Stowmarket

Gedding is a village and civil parish in the Mid Suffolk district of Suffolk in eastern England. Located around six miles south east of Bury St Edmunds. At the 2011 census its population was 125, rising to 134 at the 2018 ONS mid year estimate.

== History ==
The village's name derives from the old english phrase meaning Gydda's People. In 1086 it is recorded in the Domesday Book as Geldinga with 18 households made up of 15 freemen and 3 smallholders along with 5 acres of meadow. The land was held by Bury Abbey and William de Warenne, 1st Earl of Surrey.

There were two windmills in the parish, both were Post mills with one existing from 1783 to c. 1904. The other post mill came from Felsham in 1867 having been originally constructed in 1824, it was demolished in 1944, on the journey from Felsham it was pulled by 26 horses and got stuck at a ford.

There are six listed buildings in Gedding, four are grade II with the early C.16th Gedding Hall being grade II* listed and the grade I church of St Mary.

== Bradfield Woods ==
Bradfield Woods National Nature Reserve and Site of Special Scientific Interest is located just to the west of the village.
