= Wainford Rural District =

Former rural district in East Suffolk, England

Coordinates: 52.43°N 1.47°E

Wainford
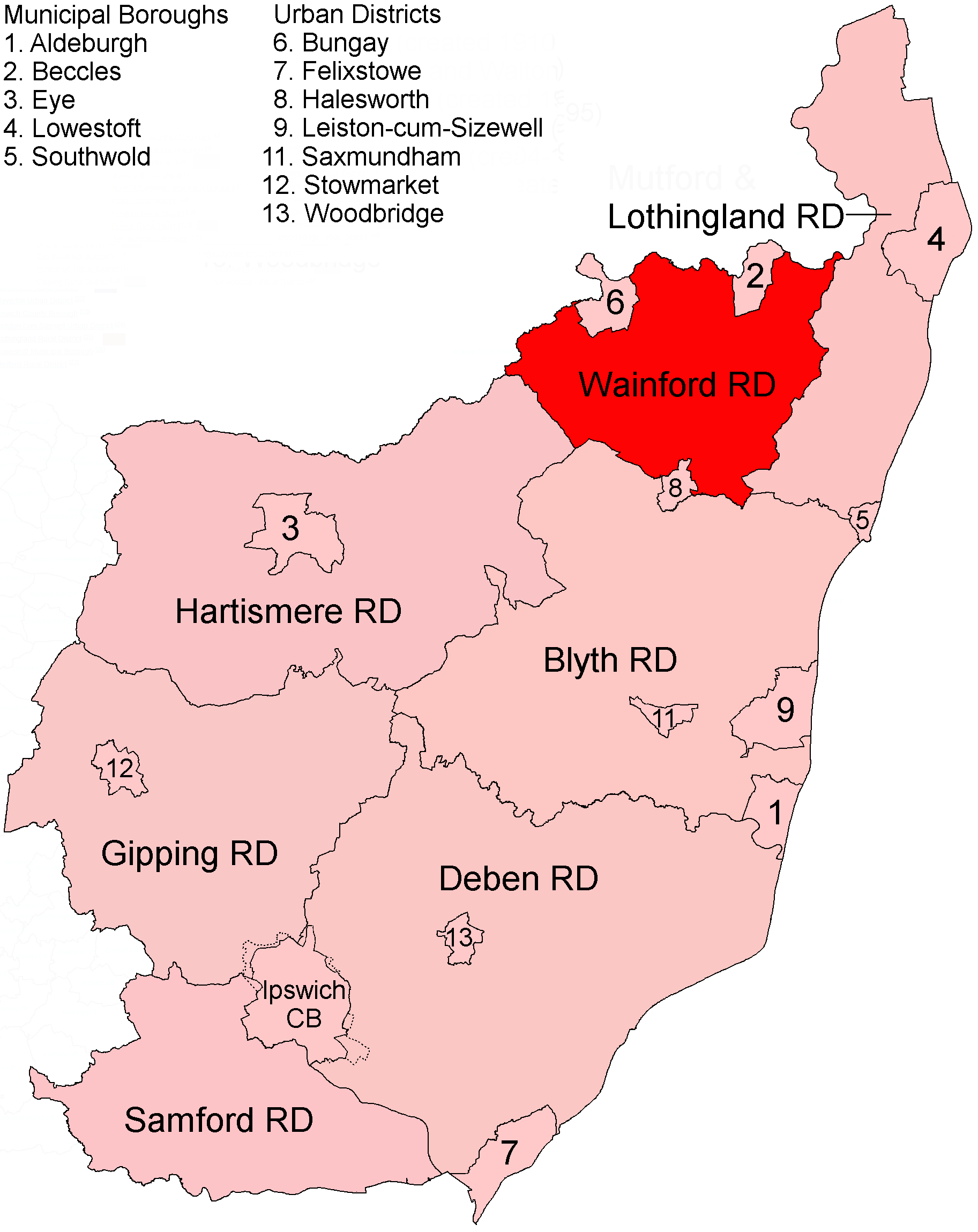
- Location within East Suffolk, 1934
- History
  - Created: 1934
  - Abolished: 1974
  - Succeeded by: Waveney
- Status: Rural district

Wainford Rural District was a rural district in East Suffolk, England, between 1934 and 1974. It was created by a merger of the disbanded Wangford Rural District and parts of Blything Rural District, and contained the group of small villages collectively known as The Saints. The name Wainford is linked to that of Wangford, a historic hundred of Suffolk.

The district was abolished in 1974 under the Local Government Act 1972, and the area became part of the Waveney district.

== Statistics ==
| Year | Area | | Population | Density (pop/ha) |
| Year | acres | ha | Population | Density (pop/ha) |
|---|---|---|---|---|
| 1951 | 44,900 | 18,171 | 7,069 | 0.39 |
| 1961 | 44,900 | 18,171 | 6,299 | 0.35 |

== Parishes ==
Parishes formerly in Wangford RD: Stoven, Westhall, Wissett, Barsham, Ellough, Flixton, Homersfield, Ilketshall (St Andrew, St John, St Lawrence, St Margaret), Mettingham, North Cove, Redisham, Ringsfield, Shadingfield, Shipmeadow, Sotterley, South Elmham (All Saints and St Nicholas, St Cross, St James, St Margaret, St Michael, St Peter), Weston, Willingham St Mary, Worlingham.

Formerly in Blything RD: Blyford, Brampton, Holton, Rumburgh, Sotherton, Spexhall
