= East Suffolk (county) =

Former county in eastern England

Coordinates: 52.20°N 1.25°E

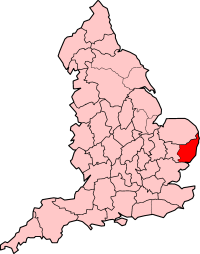
- Area
  - 1911: 549,241 acres (2,222.70 km^{2})
  - 1961: 547,397 acres (2,215.24 km^{2})
- Population
  - 1901: 189,170
  - 1971: 258,054
- History
  - Created: 1889
  - Abolished: 1974
  - Succeeded by: Suffolk, with a small part transferred to Norfolk
- Status: Administrative county
- Government: East Suffolk County Council
  - HQ: Ipswich

East Suffolk, along with West Suffolk, was created in 1888 as an administrative county of England. The administrative county was based on the eastern quarter sessions division of Suffolk. East Suffolk County Council's headquarters were at East Suffolk County Hall in Ipswich.

In 1974, most of the county reunified with West Suffolk and the county borough of Ipswich to form the non-metropolitan county of Suffolk.

== Subdivisions ==
From 1894 the administrative county was divided into municipal boroughs, urban districts and rural districts:

- Boroughs: Aldeburgh, Beccles, Eye, Lowestoft, Southwold
- Urban districts: Bungay (created 1910), Felixstowe and Walton, (renamed Felixstowe 1914), Halesworth (created 1900), Leiston-cum-Sizewell (created 1895), Oulton Broad (created 1904, abolished 1919), Saxmundham (created 1900), Stowmarket, Woodbridge
- Rural districts created in 1894: Blything, Bosmere and Claydon, East Stow, Hartismere, Hoxne, Mutford and Lothingland, Plomesgate, Samford, Wangford, Woodbridge
  - The Rural Districts were completely reorganised by a County Review Order in 1934, and reduced to seven in number: Blyth, Deben, Gipping, Hartismere, Lothingland, Samford, Wainford

The rural districts were further subdivided into civil parishes.

== District Council ==
On 1 April 2019 a new East Suffolk district was created by the abolition and merger of Waveney and Suffolk Coastal districts. The new district, covers a smaller area than the pre-1974 East Suffolk county council.
