= Melford Rural District =

Former rural district in West Suffolk, England

Coordinates: 52.04°N 0.75°E

Melford
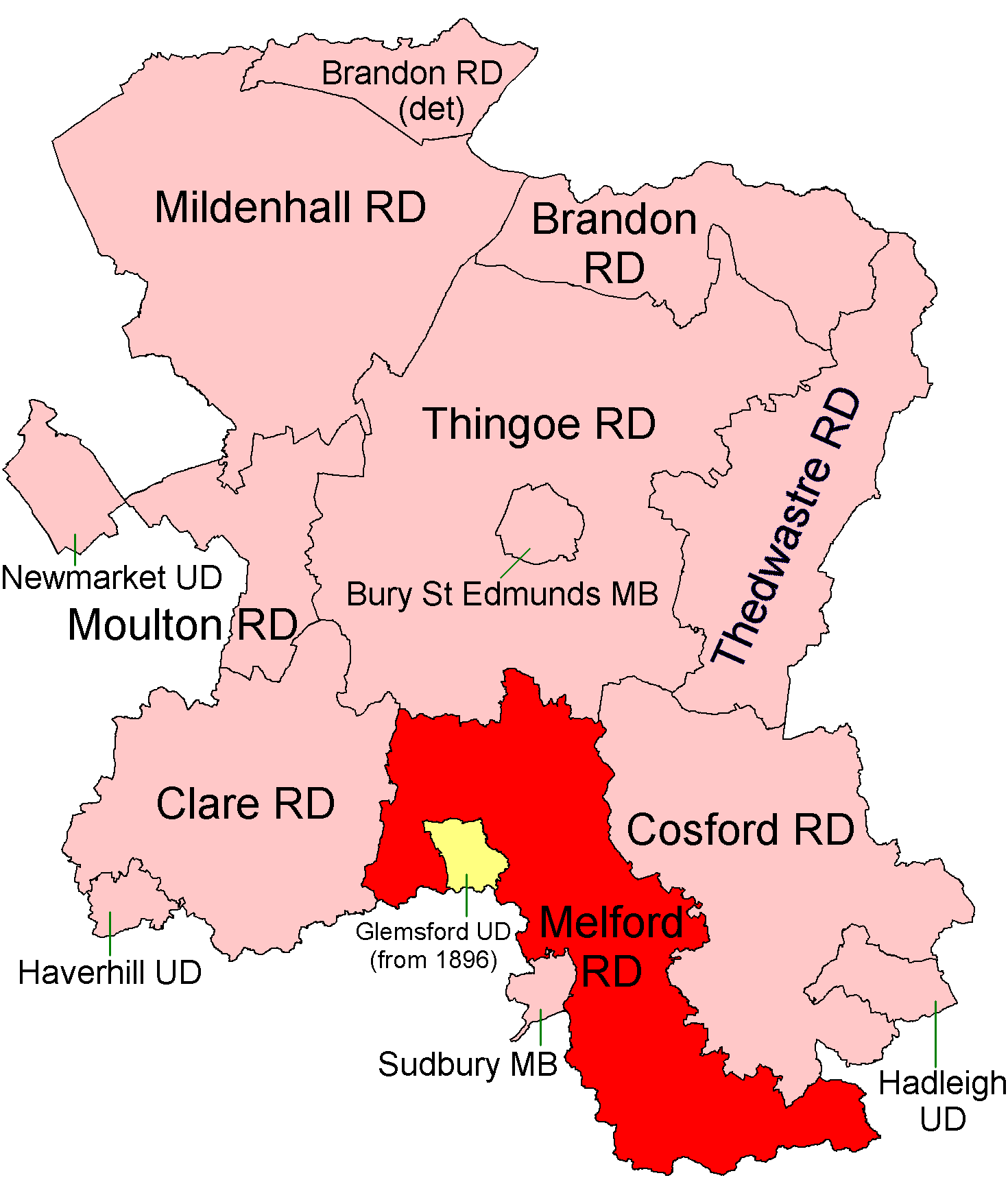
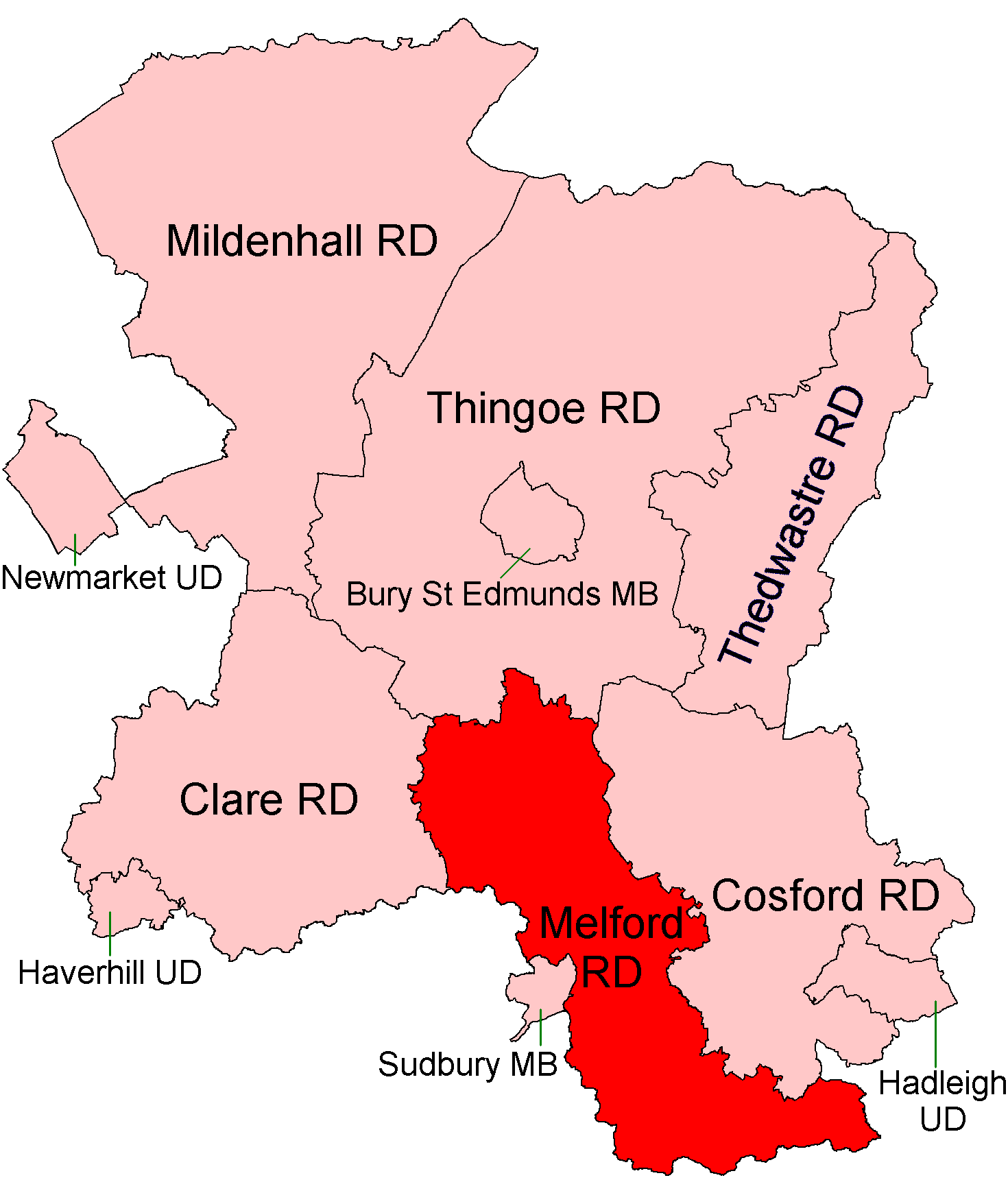
- Location within West Suffolk, 1894; Glemsford UD in yellow. Location within West Suffolk, 1935
- History
  - Created: 1894
  - Abolished: 1974
  - Succeeded by: Babergh
- Status: Rural district
  - HQ: Sudbury

Melford Rural District was a rural district in the county of West Suffolk, England. It was created in 1894, under the Local Government Act 1894 from that part of the Sudbury rural sanitary district in West Suffolk (the rest becoming Belchamp Rural District in Essex). It was named after Long Melford and administered from Sudbury. Shortly after its creation, in 1896, the parish of Glemsford was made a separate urban district.

On 1 April 1935 it lost the parishes of Cavendish and Hawkedon to the Clare Rural District. At the same time the Glemsford Urban District was abolished and restored to the district.

Since 1 April 1974 it has formed part of the District of Babergh.

== Parishes ==
At the time of its dissolution it consisted of the following 21 civil parishes.

- Acton
- Alpheton
- Assington
- Boxted
- Bures St. Mary
- Chilton
- Glemsford
- Great Cornard
- Great Waldingfield
- Hartest
- Lawshall
- Leavenheath
- Little Cornard
- Little Waldingfield
- Long Melford
- Nayland-with-Wissington
- Newton
- Shimpling
- Somerton
- Stanstead
- Stoke-by-Nayland

== Statistics ==
Year	Area		Population	Density (pop/ha)
Year	acres	ha	Population	Density (pop/ha)
1911	49,850	20,174	12,791	0.63
1921	49,850	20,174	12,189	0.60
1931	49,850	20,174	11,618	0.58
1951	47,398	19,181	12,957	0.68
1961	47,397	19,181	13,317	0.69
