= Charsfield =

Village in Suffolk, England

Coordinates: 52.161096°N 1.292329°E

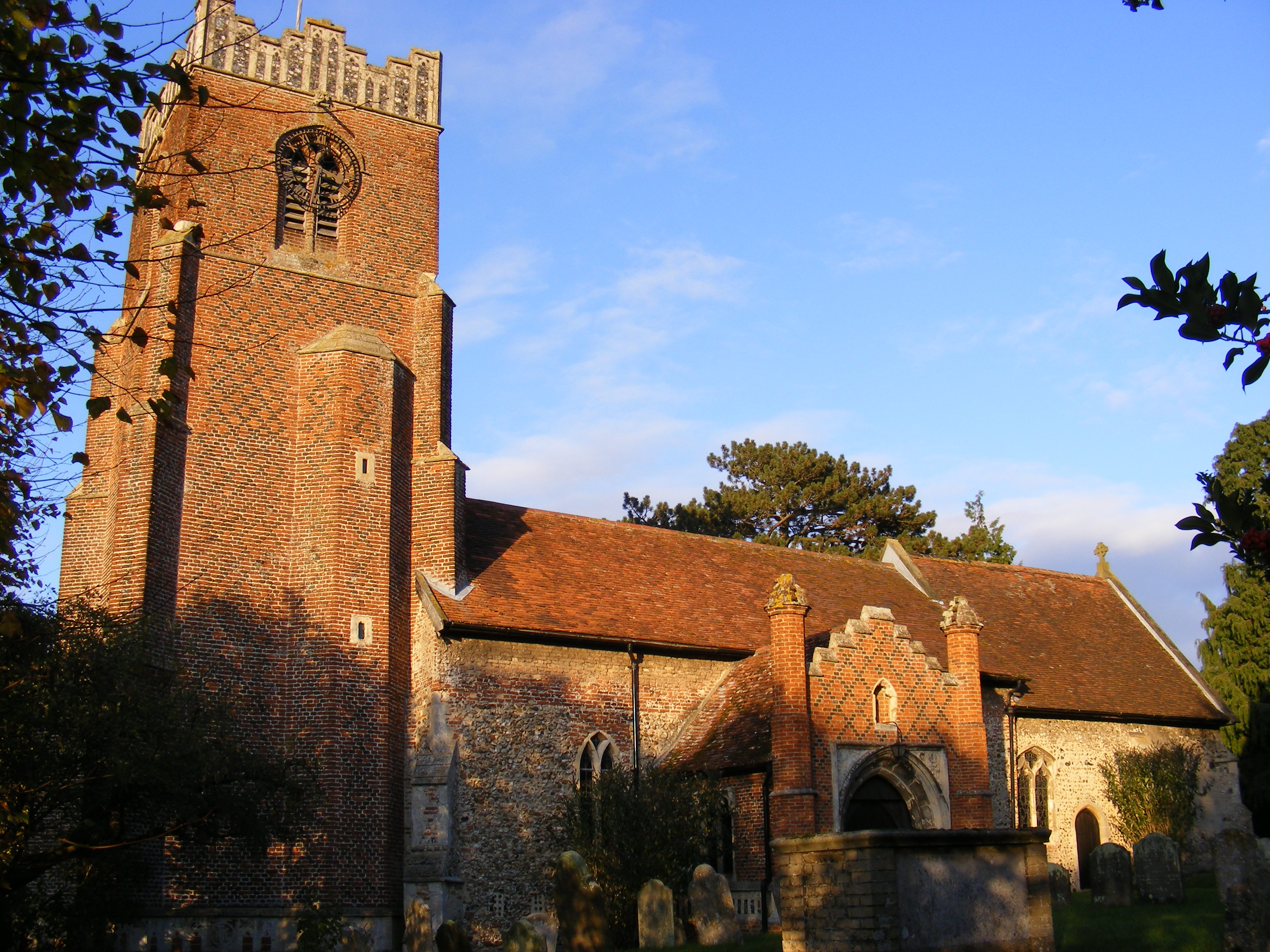
- Church of St Peter, Charsfield

- Location within Suffolk
- Population: 342 (2021)
- District: East Suffolk
- Shire county: Suffolk
- Region: East
- Country: England
- Sovereign state: United Kingdom
- Post town: Woodbridge
- Postcode district: IP13

Charsfield is a small Suffolk village of 342 residents, 3 miles (4.8 km) from Wickham Market, 7 miles (11 km) from Woodbridge and 12 miles (19 km) from Ipswich and is located near the villages of Debach and Dallinghoo. A civil parish in East Anglia, Charsfield was famously used as one of the key locations in the 1974 film Akenfield, based loosely upon the book Akenfield: Portrait of an English Village by Ronald Blythe (1969). Charsfield hosted the first Greenbelt festival – an annual festival of arts, faith and justice – on a pig farm just outside the village over the August 1974 bank holiday weekend.

== Local facilities ==
- Charsfield village hall
- Baptist Chapel
- Charsfield Primary School (linked to St Peter's church); famous alumni of the school include Charlotte Greig, a British novelist, singer, and songwriter.
- Charsfield recreation ground
- Garage
- St Peter's Church (Church of England parish church)

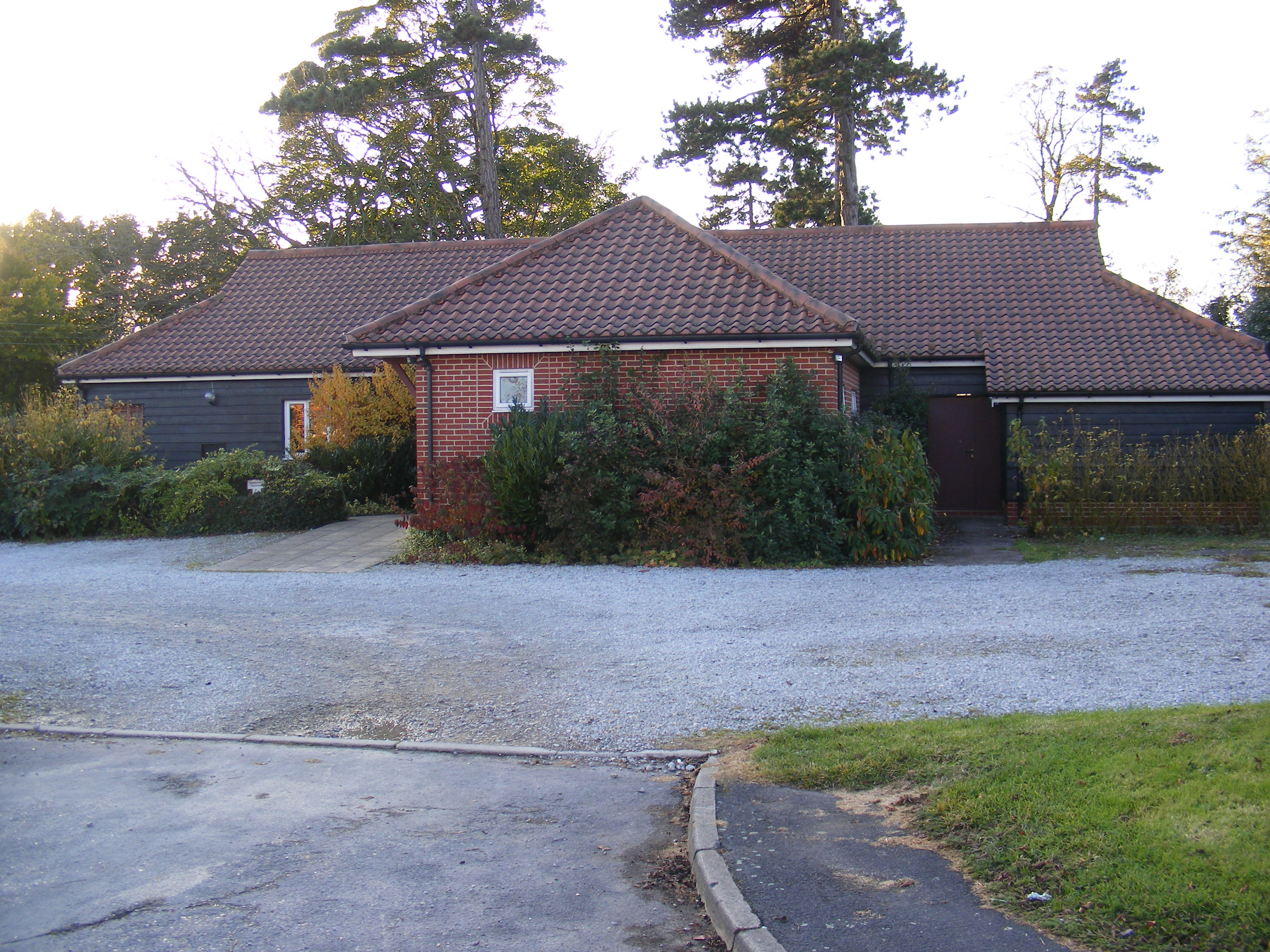
Charsfield Village Hall

== Notable people ==
- George Fox the Younger (died 1661) was born in Charsfield. He came to the same religious conclusions in the early 1650s as his namesake, George Fox (1624–1691), the founder of the Quaker movement. The former was so-named because, of the two, he was "the younger in the truth". His strong-worded tracts were published after his death.
- Michael Parkes (1931–1977) an engineer at Rootes in the 1950s, on the Hillman Imp project, when he began a sports car racing career (including Le Mans). Joining Ferrari as an engineer in 1963, he had his chance to drive in the Formula One championship when John Surtees split with the company. He raced four times in 1966 (coming second twice) but this career ended in 1967 when he skidded in his second race, breaking both legs. He returned to sports car racing in the 1970s but died in a road accident in Italy in August 1977. His father, John Joseph Parkes, who had been Chairman of the Alvis Car Company, retired to Suffolk and was living at Brook Farmhouse in Charsfield by that time. Both father and son are buried near the north-east corner of St Peter's churchyard.
- Peggy Cole (1936–2016) was born in Easton, Suffolk, but by the early 1970s was resident in Charsfield when local Akenfield author Ronald Blythe introduced her to the Director, Peter Hall at the village flower show. This led to her being cast as Dulcie Rouse, mother of the central character in the film of Akenfield and, subsequently, caused her to be a well-known local figure. Her "council house garden", previously opened on occasion for charity, became highly visited (once by Princess Margaret). Peggy was keenly interested in Suffolk rural life. She wrote several books, gave talks and regularly broadcast on local radio. She received the MBE in 1993 for her charity work. She died in January 2016, aged 80.
