= Bromeswell =

Village in Suffolk, England

Coordinates: 52.106928°N 1.360356°E

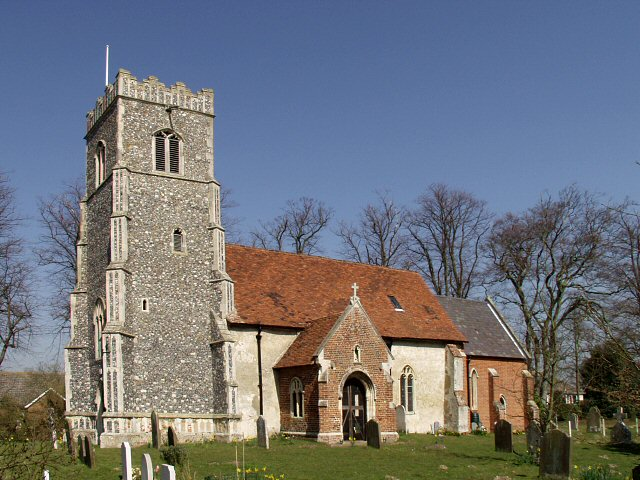
- Church of St Edmund, Bromeswell

- Location within Suffolk
- Population: 314 (2011 census)
- District: East Suffolk
- Shire county: Suffolk
- Region: East
- Country: England
- Sovereign state: United Kingdom
- Post town: Woodbridge
- Postcode district: IP12

Bromeswell is a village and civil parish in the East Suffolk district of Suffolk, England about 2 miles east of Woodbridge.

Situated near the River Deben, Bromeswell lies on fairly high and fertile ground with low-lying heathland to the South and marshland to the West.

A mile to the south west is Sutton Hoo, the Anglo-Saxon burial site situated alongside the River Deben.

The parish church of Bromeswell is situated in what is considered the centre of the village. The church has roots from several centuries ago, with a tower to the West, a vestry to the North and a South porch. The church consists of various additional features from various centuries.

Bromeswell lacks most public amenities but has a bus stop, post box and traditional village inn, the Unruly Pig.
