= Cretingham =

Village in Suffolk, England

Coordinates: 52.196°N 1.259°E

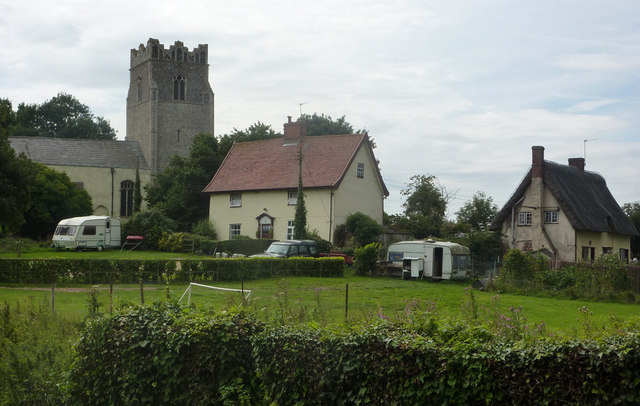
- St Peter's church

- Location within Suffolk
- Population: 196 (2011)
- OS grid reference: TM2260
- Civil parish: Cretingham
- District: East Suffolk
- Shire county: Suffolk
- Region: East
- Country: England
- Sovereign state: United Kingdom
- Post town: WOODBRIDGE
- Postcode district: IP13
- Dialling code: 01728
- UK Parliament: Central Suffolk and North Ipswich

Cretingham is a village and a civil parish in the East Suffolk district, in the English county of Suffolk. It is on the River Deben, 2 miles south off the A1120 road. It is four miles west from Framlingham and eight miles northwest from Woodbridge.

== Description ==
It is based on a crossroads formed by The Street (north-south) and Framsden Road (west) and Brandeston Road (east) and has a church, a pub and a golf course (to the northeast of the village).

The church of St Peter is half the way up the north part of The Street. It dates from c.1300 and is a grade II* listed building. The old Bell Inn is now a dwelling called Dial House. The new Cretingham Bell pub opened in 1967 located at the crossroads. It dates from 1620s and was formerly four cottages.

Several farms lie in the area:

- Bungalow Farm in the southwest
- Corner Farm in the southeast
- Duck's Farm to the west
- Rookery Farm and Manor Farm to the north

== History ==
The village's name means The people of a gravelly village being derived from the Old English word grēot meaning gravel.

In 1086 it was described as "Gretingeham" or "Gretingaham" in the Domesday Book and located in the old Hundred of Loes. The population was recorded as 78 households along with 30 acres of meadow, wood for 20 pigs, 4 cobs, 7 cattle, 40 pigs, 64 sheep, 32 goats, 4 beehives, and 1 mill.

There are 21 listed buildings in the parish including the grade II* listed church of St Peter.

Six bells are hung in the tower for change ringing with the heaviest weighing 7 cwt-2qr-23lb, and the oldest dating from about 1416 cast by Richard Baxter of Norwich, the tower is affiliated to the Suffolk Guild of Ringers. The bells were rehung and augmented to six with a new bell cast by John Taylor & Co in 2017. The first peal was rung on the bells on 30 Apr 1883; up to 2019 29 peals had been rung at Cretingham.

During renovation work on a hunting lodge near Aldeburgh in 1996, a carpenter uncovered a plank of wood revealing a chilling pencilled message: "A fearful murder was committed the first day of this month (October 1887) at Cretingham. A curate cut the vicar's throat at 12 o'clock at night." Sheila Hardy wrote a book about it called The Cretingham Murder.

Cretingham Primary School closed in the early 1960s (Miss Last being the final teacher).
