= Ramsholt =

Village in Suffolk, England

Coordinates: 52.02884°N 1.36737°E

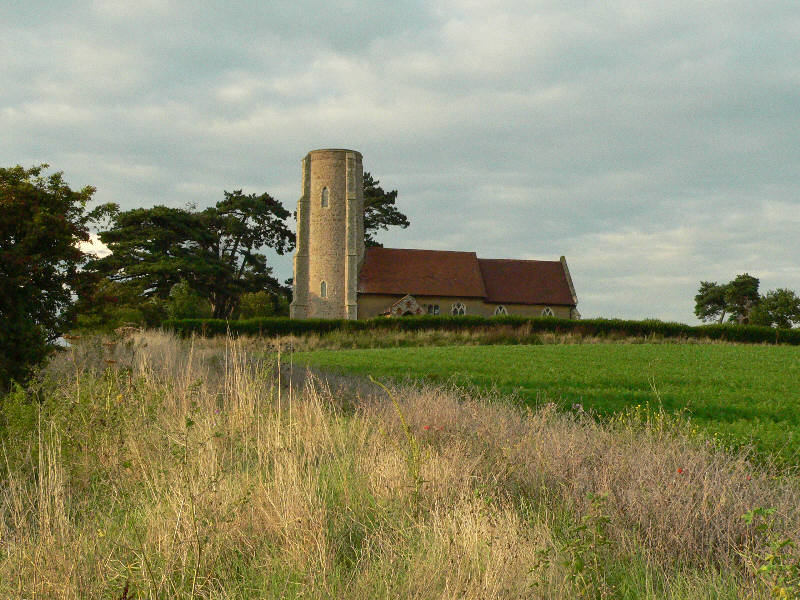
- All Saints' church

- Location within Suffolk
- Population: 32 (2001 census)
- OS grid reference: TM310420
- Civil parish: Ramsholt
- District: East Suffolk
- Shire county: Suffolk
- Region: East
- Country: England
- Sovereign state: United Kingdom
- Post town: WOODBRIDGE
- Postcode district: IP12
- Police: Suffolk
- Fire: Suffolk
- Ambulance: East of England
- UK Parliament: Suffolk Coastal

Ramsholt is a small village and civil parish in the East Suffolk district, in the county of Suffolk, England. It is situated on the northern shore of the River Deben. In 2001 the parish had a population of 32. From 1974 until 2019 it was in Suffolk Coastal district.

The parish church of All Saints is one of 38 surviving round-tower churches in Suffolk and is a Grade II* listed building.

The village economy revolves around the pub next to the river dock.

Ramsholt was a historic fishing town before Felixstowe docks.
