= Felsham =

Village in Suffolk, England

Coordinates: 52.17727°N 0.84672°E

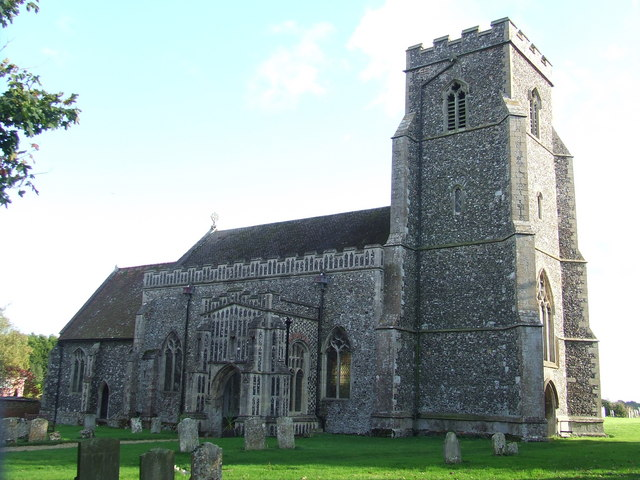
- St Peter's Church, Felsham

- Location within Suffolk
- Population: 420 (2005); 448 (2011)
- OS grid reference: TL946570
- District: Mid Suffolk
- Shire county: Suffolk
- Region: East
- Country: England
- Sovereign state: United Kingdom
- Post town: BURY ST EDMUNDS
- Postcode district: IP30
- Dialling code: 01449
- Police: Suffolk
- Fire: Suffolk
- Ambulance: East of England

Felsham is a village and civil parish in the Mid Suffolk district of Suffolk in eastern England. In 2005 its population was 420.

== History ==
The origin of the name "Felsham" is not clear, but one theory gives its meaning as Faela or "pleasant enclosure". Felsham was listed as Fealsham in the Domesday Book of 1086.

== Church ==
The church of St Peter serves the parish of Felsham. The present church was largely built in the 14th and 15th century and has an impressive north porch. The interior was unsympathetically renovated during the 19th century.

== Village life ==
The village is home to the Six Bells public house. Parts of the present building date from the 16th century, though it was largely rebuilt in the 19th and 20th centuries. Felsham was also the home of the Mudlen End Studio, which produced ceramic models of mainly cottages and dwellings from the local area.
