= Knettishall =

Village in Suffolk, England

Coordinates: 52.386°N 0.900°E

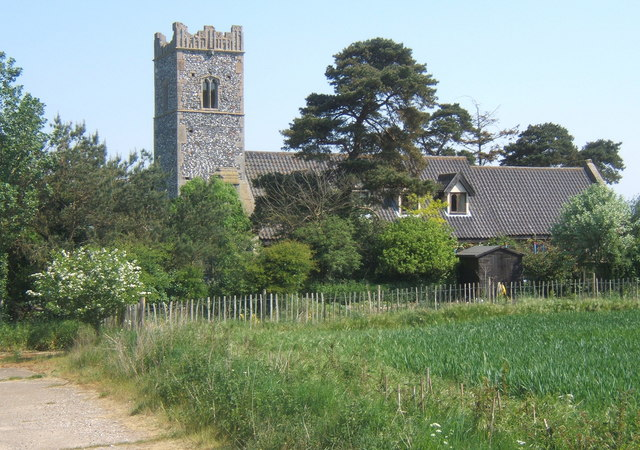
- All Saints Church, Knettishall

- Location within Suffolk
- Population: 40 (2005)
- District: West Suffolk
- Shire county: Suffolk
- Region: East
- Country: England
- Sovereign state: United Kingdom
- Post town: Diss
- Postcode district: IP22
- Dialling code: 01953
- Police: Suffolk
- Fire: Suffolk
- Ambulance: East of England
- UK Parliament: West Suffolk

Knettishall is a village and civil parish in the West Suffolk district of Suffolk, England. Located on the south bank of the River Little Ouse (the Norfolk-Suffolk border), in 2005 it had a population of 40. From the 2011 census the population of the village was included in the civil parish of neighbouring Hopton.

The parish contains Knettishall Heath Country Park and the remains of RAF Knettishall, a World War II airfield.
