= Depden =

Village in Suffolk, England

Coordinates: 52.180°N 0.607°E

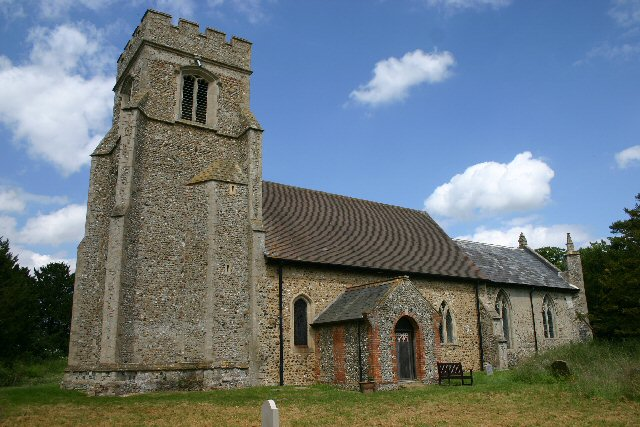
- St Mary's Church, Depden

- Location within Suffolk
- Population: 200 (2005); 184 (2011)
- District: West Suffolk
- Shire county: Suffolk
- Region: East
- Country: England
- Sovereign state: United Kingdom
- Post town: Bury St Edmunds
- Postcode district: IP29
- Police: Suffolk
- Fire: Suffolk
- Ambulance: East of England

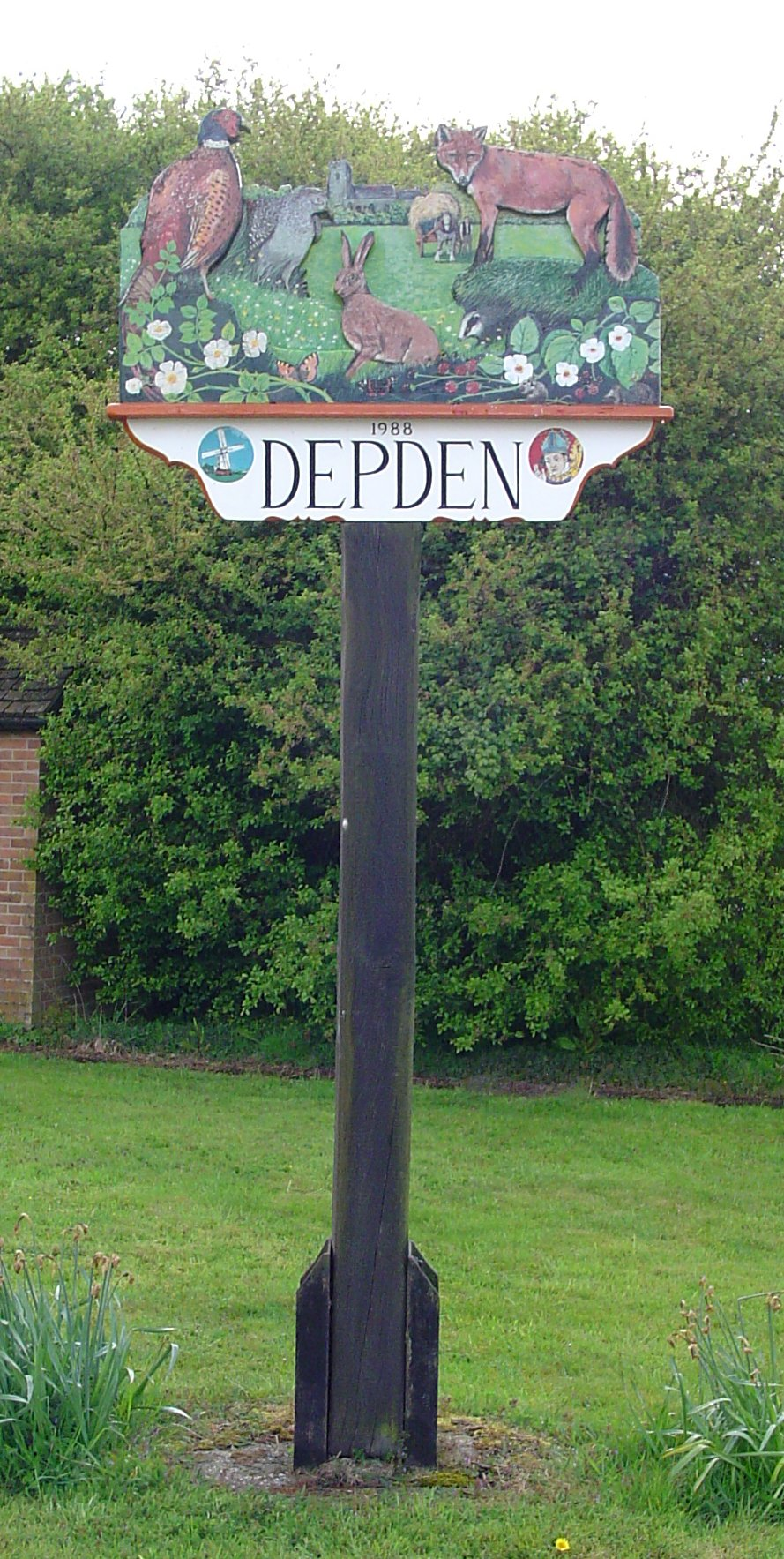
Signpost in Depden

Depden is a village and civil parish in the West Suffolk district of Suffolk in eastern England. Located on the A143 around five miles south-west of Bury St Edmunds, in 2005 its population was 200, reducing to 184 at the 2011 Census.
