= Market Weston =

Village in Suffolk, England

Coordinates: 52.360°N 0.917°E

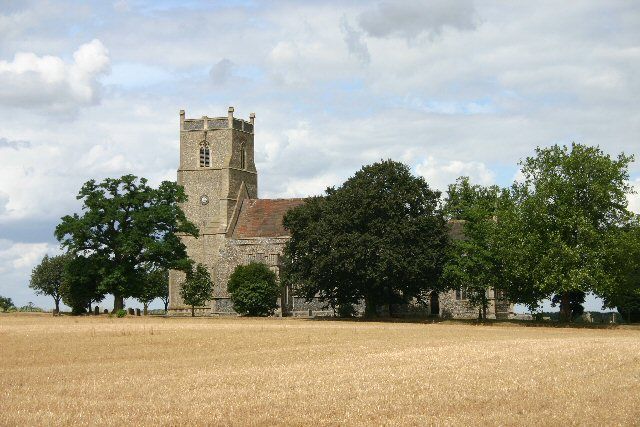
- St Mary's church

- Location within Suffolk
- Area: 3.97 km^{2} (1.53 sq mi)
- Population: 245 (2011)
  - Density: 62/km^{2} (160/sq mi)
- OS grid reference: TL988776
- District: West Suffolk
- Shire county: Suffolk
- Region: East
- Country: England
- Sovereign state: United Kingdom
- Post town: Diss
- Postcode district: IP22
- Dialling code: 01359
- Police: Suffolk
- Fire: Suffolk
- Ambulance: East of England
- UK Parliament: Bury St Edmunds and Stowmarket

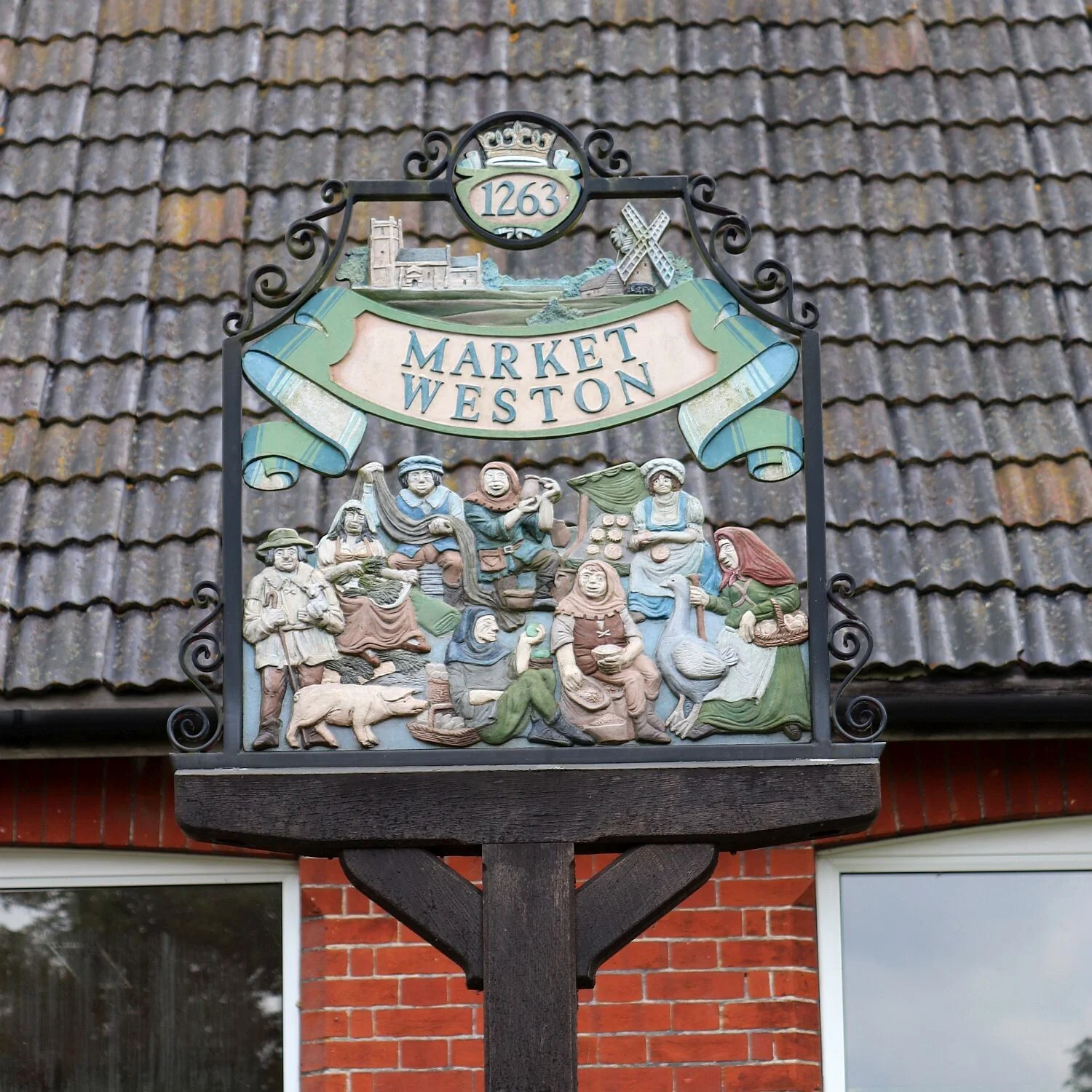
Market Weston Village Sign

Market Weston is a small village and civil parish in the West Suffolk district of Suffolk in eastern England. It is located near the Norfolk border around seven miles east-south-east of Thetford. In 2005 its population was estimated to be 260. 245 people were recorded at 2011 census. The parish also contains the Weston Fen SSSI.

The village was given a market charter in 1263.

The church of St. Mary has regular services and is part of the United Benefice of Stanton, Hopton, Market Weston, Barningham, Coney Weston, Hepworth, Hinderclay and Thelnetham. It dates from the 14th century and is a Grade II* listed building.
