= Blything Rural District =

Former local government area in the UK

Coordinates: 52.33°N 1.54°E

Blything
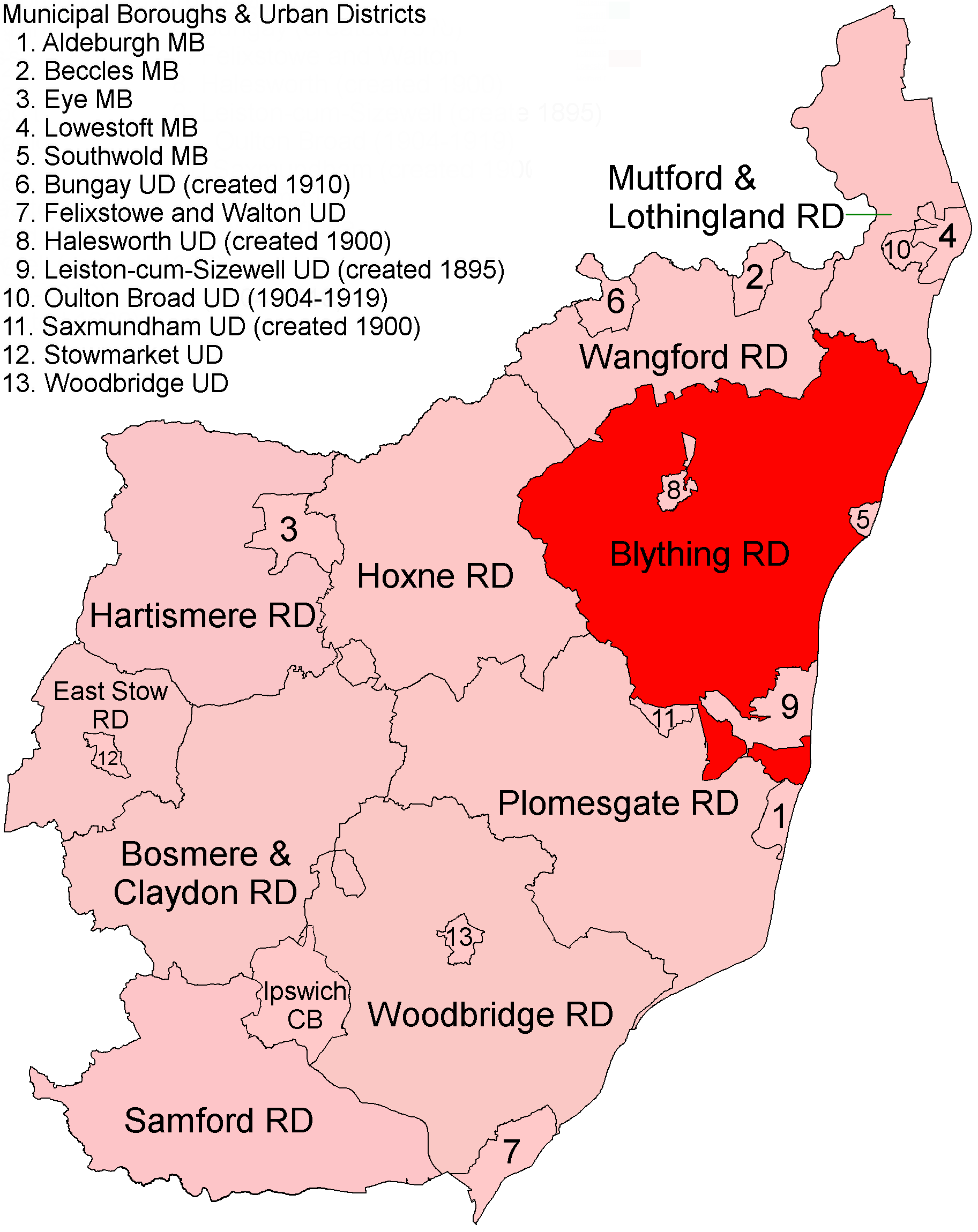
- Location within East Suffolk, 1894
- History
  - Created: 28 December 1894
  - Abolished: 31 March 1934
  - Succeeded by: Blyth Rural District
- Status: Rural district
  - HQ: Bulcamp, Blythburgh

Blything Rural District was a rural district within the administrative county of East Suffolk between 1894 and 1934.

== Evolution ==
The district had its origins in the Blything Hundred Incorporation, set up in 1764 to administer the poor laws in the hundred of Blything. A workhouse to serve the area was built at Bulcamp in the parish of Blythburgh, opening in 1766. Following the Poor Law Amendment Act 1834, the old incorporation was dissolved and replaced by the Blything Poor Law Union in 1835. In 1872, sanitary districts were established, with responsibility for public health and local government given to the boards of guardians of poor law unions for areas without urban authorities. The Blything Rural Sanitary District therefore covered the area of the Blything Poor Law Union except for the parish of Southwold, which was a municipal borough and so formed its own urban sanitary district.

Under the Local Government Act 1894, rural sanitary districts became rural districts on 28 December 1894. Blything Rural District Council held its first meeting on 31 December 1894 at the Blything Union Workhouse at Bulcamp, Blythburgh. Thomas Lomax of Grove Park, Yoxford, was appointed the first chairman of the council; he had previously been chairman of the Blything Board of Guardians. The council continued to be based at the workhouse at Bulcamp throughout its existence.

Two urban districts were subsequently created out of parishes within Blything: Leiston cum Sizewell in 1895 and Halesworth in 1900.

In 1934, under a county review order, Blything Rural District was abolished. The largest part of its territory passed to the new but similarly named Blyth Rural District; apart from small adjustments the rest went to Lothingland and Wainford rural districts.

== Statistics ==
Year	Area		Population	Density (pop/ha)
Year	acres	ha	Population	Density (pop/ha)
1911	87,438	35,385	18,190	0.51
1921	87,438	35,385	17,896	0.51
1931	87,438	35,385	16,614	0.47

== Parishes ==
Parish	To	Notes
Aldringham cum Thorpe	1934	Detached. To Blyth RD
Benacre	1934	To Lothingland RD
Blyford	1934	To Wainford RD
Blythburgh	1934	To Blyth RD
Bramfield	1934	To Blyth RD
Brampton	1934	To Wainford RD
Chediston	1934	To Blyth RD
Cookley	1934	To Blyth RD
Covehithe	1934	To Lothingland RD
Cratfield	1934	To Blyth RD
Darsham	1934	To Blyth RD
Dunwich	1934	To Blyth RD (part to Southwold MB)
Easton Bavents	1934	To Lothingland RD (part to Southwold MB)
Frostenden	1934	To Lothingland RD
Halesworth	1900	To Halesworth UD
Henham	1934	To Lothingland RD
Henstead	1934	To Lothingland RD
Heveningham	1934	To Blyth RD
Holton	1934	To Wainford RD (part to Halesworth UD)
Huntingfield	1934	To Blyth RD
Kelsale cum Carlton	1934	To Blyth RD
Knodishall	1934	To Blyth RD
Leiston	1895	To Leiston cum Sizewell UD
Linstead Magna	1934	To Blyth RD
Linstead Parva	1934	To Blyth RD
Middleton	1934	To Blyth RD
Peasenhall	1934	To Blyth RD
Reydon	1934	To Lothingland RD
Rumburgh	1934	To Wainford RD
Sibton	1934	To Blyth RD
Sotherton	1934	To Wainford RD
South Cove	1934	To Lothingland RD
Spexhall	1934	To Wainford RD
Stoven	1934	To Wainford RD
Theberton	1934	To Blyth RD (part to Leiston-cum-Sizewell UD)
Thorington	1934	To Blyth RD
Ubbeston	1934	To Blyth RD
Uggeshall	1934	To Lothingland RD
Walberswick	1934	To Blyth RD (part to Southwold MB)
Walpole	1934	To Blyth RD
Wangford	1934	To Lothingland RD
Wenhaston	1934	To Blyth RD
Westhall	1934	To Wainford RD
Westleton	1934	To Blyth RD
Wissett	1934	To Wainford RD (part to Halesworth UD)
Wrentham	1934	To Lothingland RD
Yoxford	1934	To Blyth RD
