= Blything Hundred =

Historical division of Suffolk, England

Coordinates: 52.34°N 1.54°E

Blything Hundred

Blything was a hundred of eastern Suffolk, and with an area of 87,641 acres (354.67 km^{2}) was the largest of Suffolk's 21 hundreds.

The origins of the hundred centre on the ancient royal estate of Blythburgh, whose hall housed the hundred's central meeting place.

Listed as Blidinga in the Domesday Book, the hundred's name means "the people of the Blyth" a subgroup of the Iceni who populated the valleys of the River Blyth; the hundred corresponds closely to the drainage basin of the River Blyth together with other minor rivers. The name "Blyth" itself means 'blithe' or 'pleasant' and shares its name with a river in Northamptonshire, and one in Northumberland.

== Blythburg Hundred Incorporation ==
Blythburgh Hundred Incorpration was created by act of parliament in 1746.

== Parishes ==
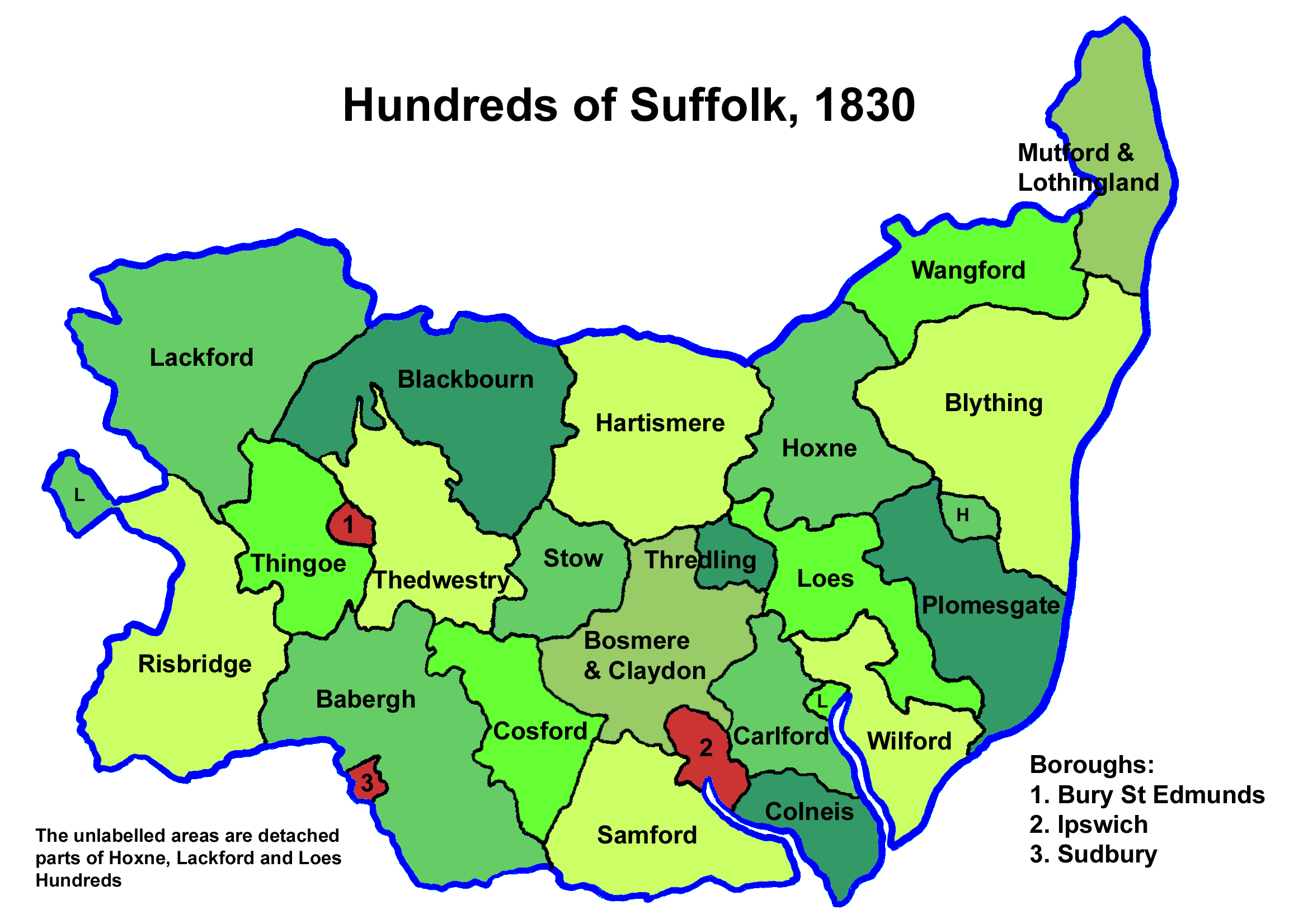
Suffolk hundreds

Blything Hundred consisted of the following parishes:

Parish	Area (acres)
Aldringham	628
Benacre	2576
Blythburgh	4111
Blythford	1373
Bramfield	2547
Brampton	1967
Chediston	2378
Cookley	1552
Covehithe	1524
Cratfield	2000
Darsham	1493
Dunwich	1334
Easton Bavents	260
Frostenden	1292
Halesworth	1420
Henham	1500
Heveningham	1900
Henstead	1920
Hulverstreet	293
Holton	1132
Huntingfield	2011
Knodishall	1731
Leiston	4966
Linstead Magna	1304
Linstead Parva	554
Middleton cum Fordley	2024
Peasenhall	1972
Reydon	2675
Rumburgh	1370
Sibton	2680
Sotherton	1084
South Cove	1198
Southwold	632
Spexhall	1482
Stoven	762
Theberton	2050
Thorington	1411
Ubbeston	1207
Uggeshall	1455
Walberswick	1771
Walpole	1624
Wangford	829
Wenhaston	2327
Westhall	2194
Westleton	6103
Wissett	2260
Wrentham	1280
Yoxford	2670
