= Wangford with Henham =

Civil parish in Suffolk, England

Coordinates: 52.352°N 1.611°E

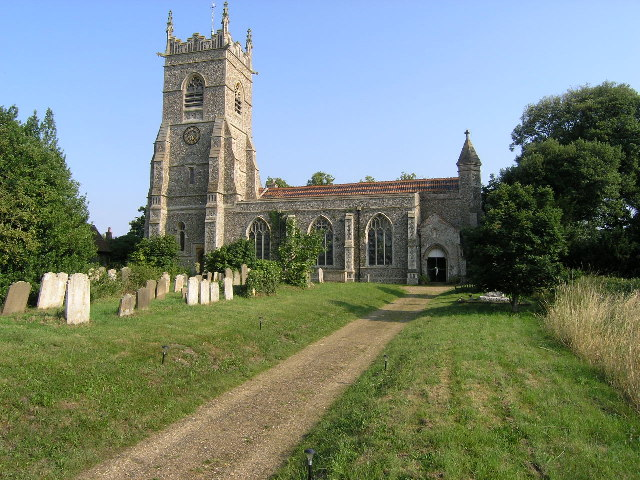
- Wangford church

- Location within Suffolk
- Area: 11 km^{2} (4.2 sq mi)
- Population: 591
  - Density: 54/km^{2} (140/sq mi)
- OS grid reference: TM460788
- Civil parish: Wangford with Henham
- District: East Suffolk
- Shire county: Suffolk
- Region: East
- Country: England
- Sovereign state: United Kingdom
- Post town: Beccles
- Postcode district: NR34
- Dialling code: 01502
- Police: Suffolk
- Fire: Suffolk
- Ambulance: East of England
- UK Parliament: Suffolk Coastal

Wangford with Henham is a civil parish in the East Suffolk district of the English county of Suffolk. It is around 5.5 miles (8.9 km) east of Halesworth, 3 miles (4.8 km) north-west of Southwold and 8.5 miles (13.7 km) south of Beccles. The parish includes the village of Wangford, the hamlet of Barnaby Green and Henham Park, the site of the Latitude Festival and a variety of other events. The Henham estate, owned by the Rous family, later the Earls of Stradbroke, owned much of the land in the parish and were responsible for many of the buildings in the area.

The parish has an area of 11 square kilometres (4.2 mi^{2}). The current parish was formed on 1 April 1987 from the parishes of Wangford and Henham. It borders the parishes of Blyford, Blythburgh, Frostenden, Reydon, Sotherton and Uggeshall. Until 2019 it was in Waveney district.

At the 2011 United Kingdom census the parish had a population of 591, reduced from a mid 2005 estimate of 640. (Note: 2011 United Kingdom census population data from the Office for National Statistics used a 'best-fit' method and, as a result, does not necessarily map exactly to parish boundaries.) A 2016 estimate suggested that the population had continued to decline to a total of 546.

The A12 runs through the east of the parish, bypassing the village of Wangford. The A145 road runs through to the west of Henham Park through the western part of the parish, whilst the A1095 marks the southern edge of the parish, linking Southwold to the A12 at Blythburgh and the B1126 runs from Wangford to Reydon and Southwold.
