= Blyth Rural District =

Former local government area in the UK

Coordinates: 52.22°N 1.49°E

Blyth
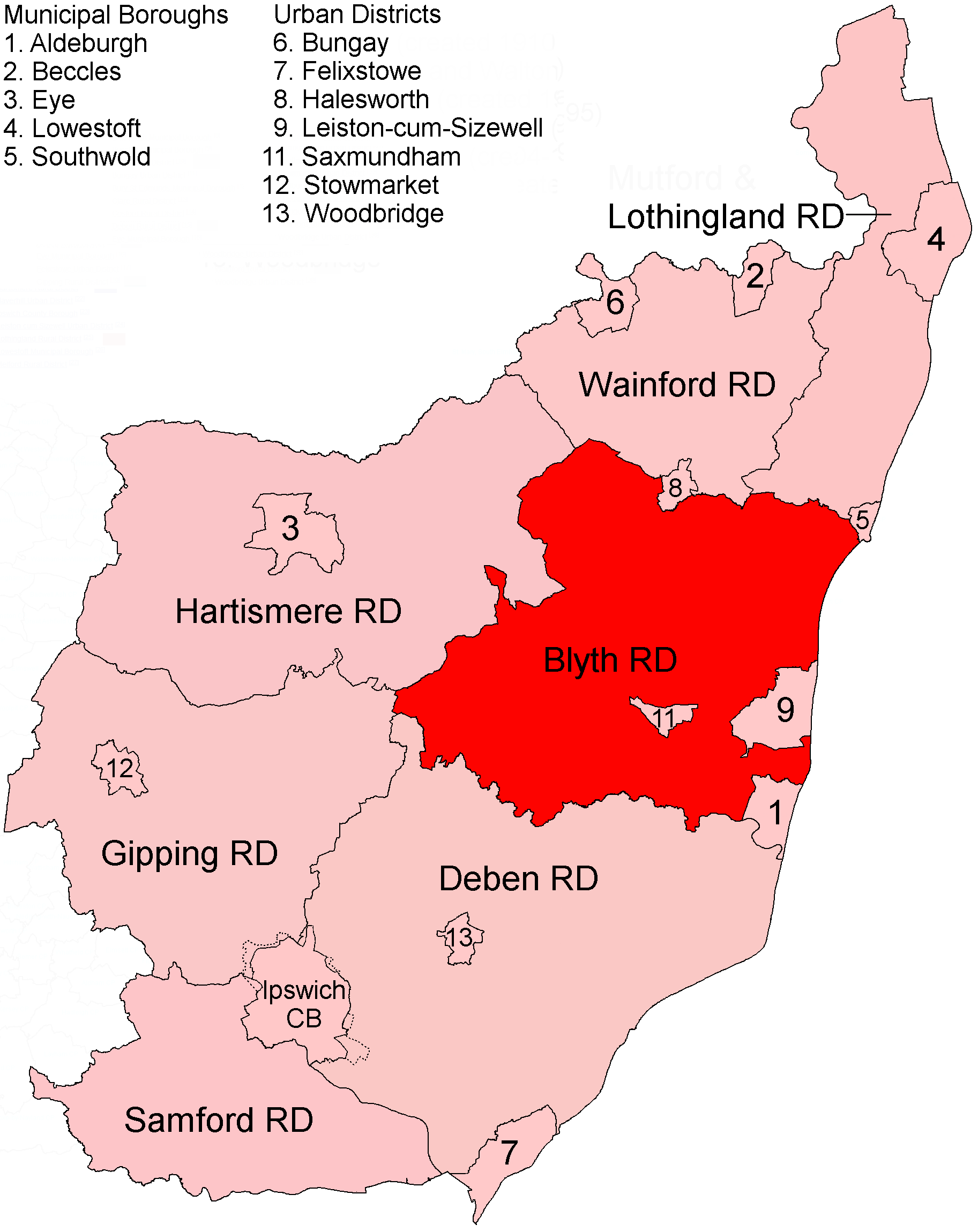
- Location within East Suffolk, 1934
- History
  - Created: 1 April 1934
  - Abolished: 31 March 1974
  - Succeeded by: Suffolk Coastal
- Status: Rural district
  - HQ: Blyth House, Rendham Road, Saxmundham

Blyth Rural District was a rural district in East Suffolk, England, between 1934 and 1974.

The rural district was formed by the merger of parts of Blything Rural District and Plomesgate Rural District with a small parts of Hoxne Rural District, all of which were being abolished. It covered a coastal area north of Aldeburgh and inland parishes around Saxmundham, although both those towns were excluded from the district.

Shortly after the district's creation the council built itself an office on Rendham Road in Saxmundham, holding its first meeting in the new building (later known as Blyth House) in April 1935.

The district was abolished in 1974 under the Local Government Act 1972, and became part of Suffolk Coastal district.

== Statistics ==
Year	Area		Population	Density (pop/ha)
Year	acres	ha	Population	Density (pop/ha)
1939			21,215	
1951	98,184	39,734	19,281	0.49
1961	98,182	39,733	18,600	0.47

== Parishes ==
Parishes formerly in Blything Rural District:

- Blythburgh,
- Bramfield,
- Chediston,
- Cookley,
- Cratfield,
- Darsham,
- Dunwich,
- Heveningham,
- Huntingfield,
- Kelsale cum Carlton,
- Knodishall,
- Linstead Magna,
- Linstead Parva,
- Middleton,
- Peasenhall,
- Sibton,
- Theberton,
- Thorington,
- Ubbeston,
- Walberswick,
- Walpole,
- Wenhaston,
- Westleton,
- Yoxford.

Formerly in Plomesgate Rural District:

- Benhall,
- Brandeston,
- Bruisyard,
- Cransford,
- Earl Soham,
- Easton,
- Farnham,
- Framlingham,
- Friston,
- Great Glemham,
- Hacheston,
- Kettleburgh,
- Little Glemham,
- Marlesford,
- Parham,
- Rendham,
- Snape,
- Sternfield,
- Stratford St Andrew,
- Swefling.

Formerly in Hoxne Rural District:

- Badingham,
- Dennington,
- Saxtead.
