= Brampton with Stoven =

Civil parish in Suffolk, England

Coordinates: 52.387°N 1.573°E

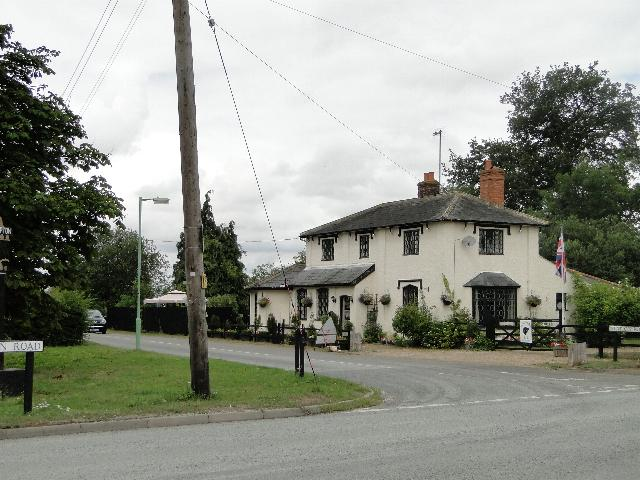
- The former Dog Public House in Brampton

- Location within Suffolk
- Area: 12 km^{2} (4.6 sq mi)
- Population: 427
  - Density: 36/km^{2} (93/sq mi)
- OS grid reference: TM495860
- District: East Suffolk
- Shire county: Suffolk
- Region: East
- Country: England
- Sovereign state: United Kingdom
- Post town: Beccles
- Postcode district: NR34
- Dialling code: 01502
- UK Parliament: Suffolk Coastal

Brampton with Stoven is a civil parish in the East Suffolk district of the English county of Suffolk. It is located 6 miles (9.7 km) south of the town of Beccles and 4 miles (6.4 km) north-east of Halesworth, with an area of 12 square kilometres (4.6 mi^{2}). The parish was formed in 1987 from the parishes of Brampton and Stoven, and the two villages are the major population centres in the parish, with Brampton the larger centre with almost all of the parishes services. It borders the parishes of Sotterley, Uggeshall, Sotherton, Westhall, Ilketshall St Andrew and Shadingfield.

At the 2011 census the population of the parish was 427, down from a mid-2005 population estimate of 460. (Note: 2011 United Kingdom census population data from the Office for National Statistics used a 'best-fit' method and, as a result, does not necessarily map exactly to parish boundaries.) A 2016 estimate suggested the population had fallen further to 411.

The A145 road passes north–south through the parish, linking Beccles to the A12 at Blythburgh to the south. The East Suffolk Line also runs north–south through the parish, with a request stop at Brampton railway station.
