= Hazlewood, Suffolk =

Former civil parish in Suffolk, England

Coordinates: 52.175546°N 1.5785201°E

Hazlewood
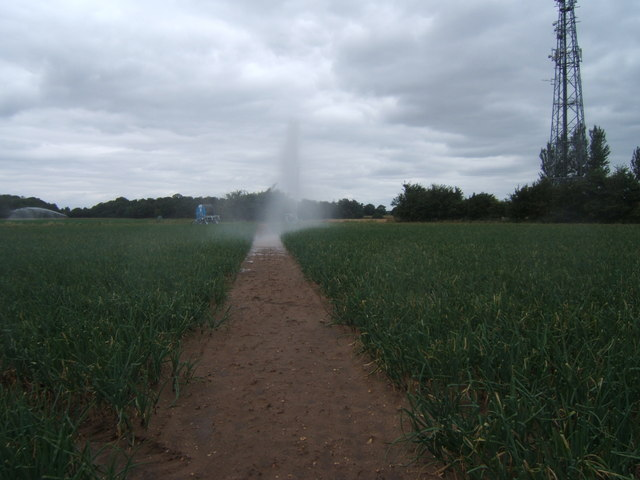

- Location within Suffolk
- Civil parish: Aldeburgh; Friston
- District: East Suffolk
- Shire county: Suffolk
- Region: East
- Country: England
- Sovereign state: United Kingdom

Hazlewood or Haslewood is a former civil parish now in the parishes of Aldeburgh and Friston, in the East Suffolk district, in the county of Suffolk, England. In 1931 the parish had a population of 177. It once has a church called St Mary but it was in ruins by 1600. Aldeburgh Golf course was in the parish.

== History ==
The name "Hazlewood" means 'Hazel wood'. Hazlewood was a chapelry, it became a civil parish in 1866, on 1 April 1934 the parish was abolished and merged into Aldeburgh and Friston.

Hazlewood was in Plomesgate hundred, from 1894 until the parish's abolition in 1934 Hazlewood was in Plomesgate Rural District in the administrative county of East Suffolk. The part that went to Aldeburgh became part of the existing municipal borough of Aldeburgh while the Friston part became part of Blyth Rural District. The entire area became part of Suffolk Coastal district in the non-metropolitan county of Suffolk in 1974, in 2019 the area became part of East Suffolk district.

== See also ==
- Hazlewood Marshes
