= Wangford Priory =

Monastery in Wangford, Suffolk, England

Coordinates: 52.3546°N 1.6201°E

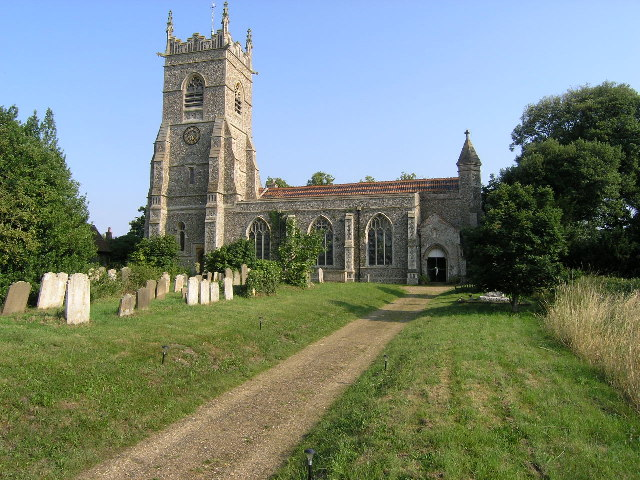
The parish church of St Peter and St Paul, restored, served as the priory church of the Wangford convent

The Cluniac Priory of Wangford was a small religious house in Wangford in the English county of Suffolk. It was founded before 1159 as a dependency of Thetford Priory. In 1376, it was naturalised before being dissolved in 1540.

== Facility and inhabitants ==
The Priory buildings adjoined the south side of the parish church. It is recorded within the church that the last remaining portions of the Priory were demolished in the late 19th century. At any given time, its complement of monks ranged from three to five men. By 1537 they had been withdrawn and the house leased as a farm.

== Priors ==
The Prior of Wangford was appointed in 1226 by Pope Honorius III to be joint Papal Commissioner along with the Abbot of Westminster and the Archdeacon of Sudbury. Together, these three men resolved important disputes over the tithes due to the church, making the prior an important figure in English Roman Catholicism.

== Dissolution ==
The final dispossession of Wangford and the mother house of Thetford was effected in 1540 with the Dissolution of the Monasteries ordered by Henry VIII of England.

== See also ==
- Cluny Abbey
- Cluniac Reforms
- Order of Saint Benedict
