= Hoxne Rural District =

Former local government area in the UK

Coordinates: 52.30°N 1.28°E

Hoxne
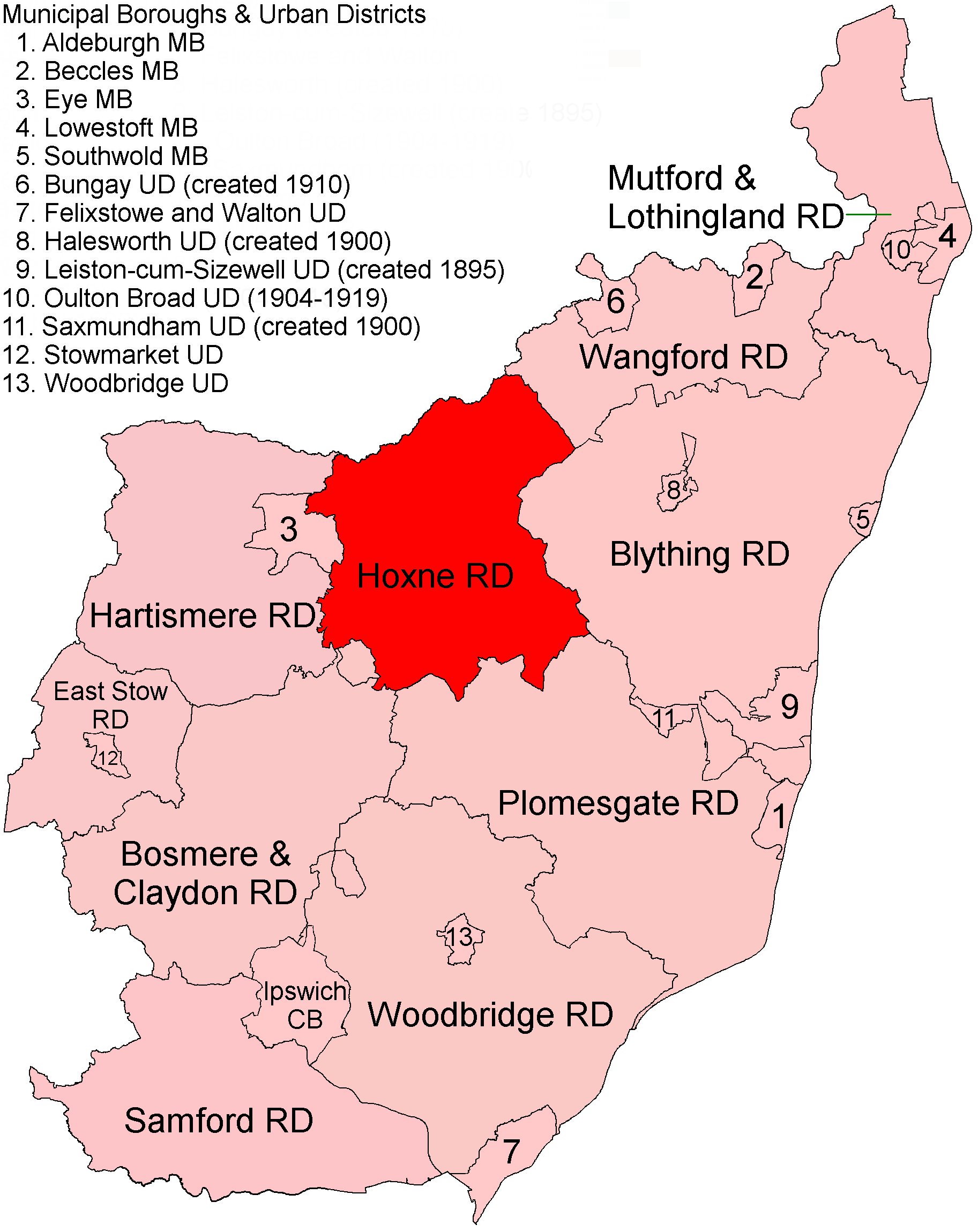
- Location within East Suffolk, 1894
- History
  - Created: 1894
  - Abolished: 1934
  - Succeeded by: Hartismere Rural District
- Status: Rural district

Hoxne Rural District was a rural district within the administrative county of East Suffolk between 1894 and 1934. It was created out of the earlier Hoxne rural sanitary district. It was named after the historic hundred of Hoxne, whose boundaries it closely matched. The hundred, in turn, took its name from the village of Hoxne.

In 1934, under a County Review Order, Hoxne Rural District was abolished and its parishes transferred to Hartismere Rural District, and in 1974 to Mid Suffolk district. 3 parishes went into the new Blyth Rural District.

== Statistics ==
Year	Area		Population	Density (pop/ha)
Year	acres	ha	Population	Density (pop/ha)
1911	52,842	21,385	10,408	0.49
1921	52,842	21,385	9,631	0.45
1931	52,842	21,385	9,045	0.42

== Parishes ==
Parishes which would be transferred to Hartismere RD: Athelington, Bedfield, Bedingfield, Brundish, Denham, Fressingfield, Horham, Hoxne, Laxfield, Mendham, Metfield, Monk Soham, Southolt, Stradbroke, Syleham, Tannington, Weybread, Wilby, Wingfield, Worlingworth.

Transferred to Blyth RD: Badingham, Dennington, Saxtead
