= Thomas Curteis =

English cricketer and clergyman

Personal information
- Full name: Thomas Spencer Curteis
- Born: 10 March 1843; Shelton, Norfolk, England
- Died: 5 June 1914 (aged 71); Brampton, Suffolk, England
- Bowling: Left-arm roundarm fast-medium

Domestic team information
- Years: Team
- 1864–1865: Cambridge University

Career statistics
| Competition | First-class |
|---|---|
| Matches | 7 |
| Runs scored | 65 |
| Batting average | 7.22 |
| 100s/50s | 0/0 |
| Top score | 16 |
| Balls bowled | 1,199 |
| Wickets | 24 |
| Bowling average | 19.43 |
| 5 wickets in innings | 0 |
| 10 wickets in match | 0 |
| Best bowling | 4/23 |
| Catches/stumpings | 6/– |
- Source: Cricinfo, 23 April 2021

Thomas Spencer Curteis (10 March 1843 – 5 June 1914) was an English first-class cricketer and clergyman.

The son of The Reverend Jeremiah Curteis, he was born in February 1836 at Shelton, Norfolk. He was educated firstly at Felsted School, before attending King Edward VI School, Bury St Edmunds, leaving in 1862. He played for the cricket eleven at King Edward VI, where he was coached by John Loraine Baldwin. From King Edward VI he went up to Trinity College, Cambridge. While studying at Cambridge, he played first-class cricket for Cambridge University Cricket Club in 1864 and 1865, making seven appearances and playing both years in The University Match against Oxford. His bowling was described by Wisden as being "very valuable" and his style as being "left-handed and very straight" and "exceedingly difficult to play". He took 24 wickets in his seven matches, with best figures of 4 for 23 and a bowling average of 19.43. Less accomplished as a batsman, he was described by Wisden as "a neat bat, but rather too fond of hitting"; his seven first-class matches yielding 65 runs. He was one of the treasurers of Cambridge University Cricket Club in 1865. His later cricket included minor matches for Norfolk and Suffolk.

After graduating from Cambridge, he took holy orders in the Anglican Church in 1866. His first ecclesiastical post was as curate at Rostherne in Cheshire, from 1866 to 1868. He held various other curacies until 1873, after which he became rector of Brampton in Suffolk in 1873. He held this rectorship until his death at Brampton in June 1914.
