= Friston =

Village in Suffolk, England

Coordinates: 52.190°N 1.528°E

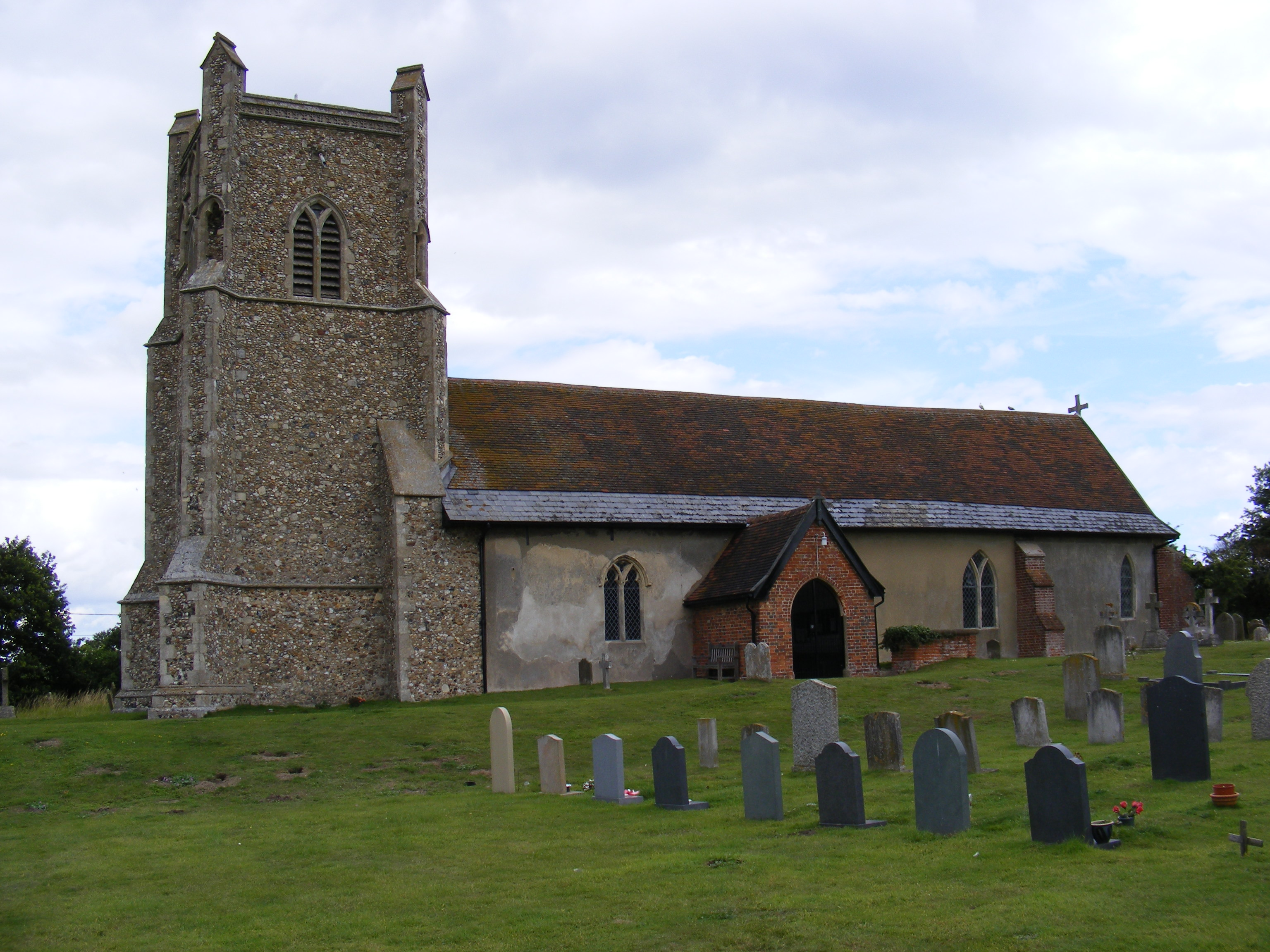
- St Mary Magdalene Church, Friston

- Location within Suffolk
- Population: 344 (2011 Census)
- Civil parish: Friston
- District: East Suffolk
- Shire county: Suffolk
- Region: East
- Country: England
- Sovereign state: United Kingdom
- Post town: SAXMUNDHAM
- Postcode district: IP17
- UK Parliament: Suffolk Coastal
- Website: www.friston.org.uk

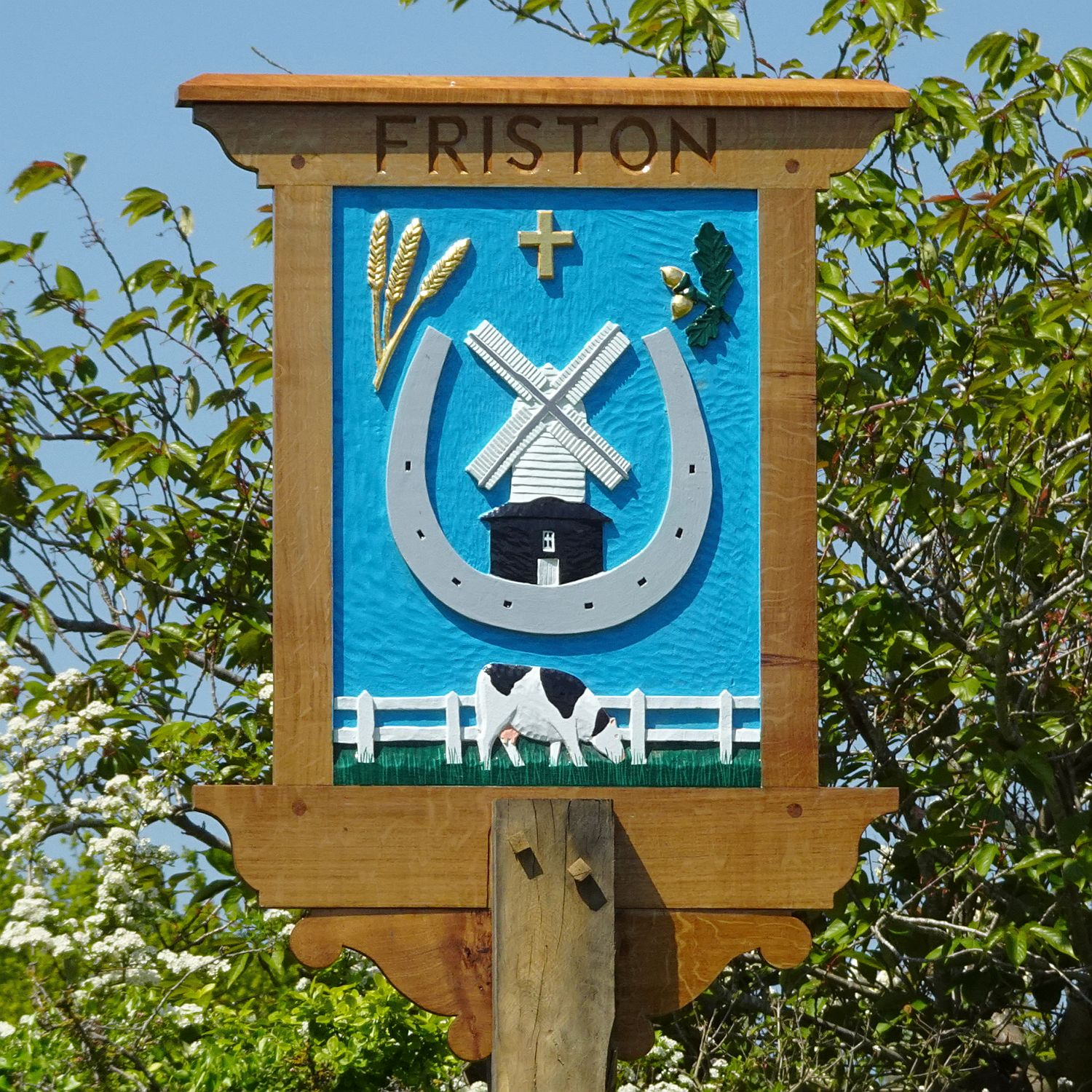
Friston Village Sign, Suffolk

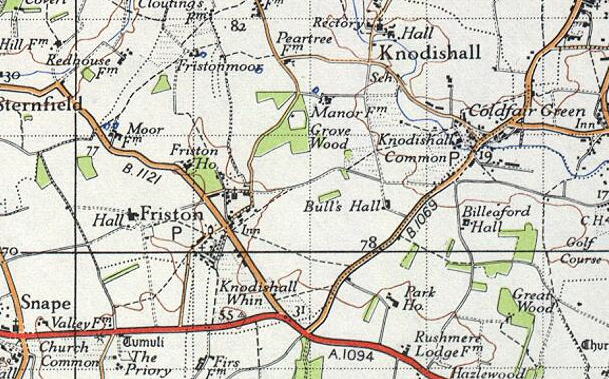
20th Century Map of Friston

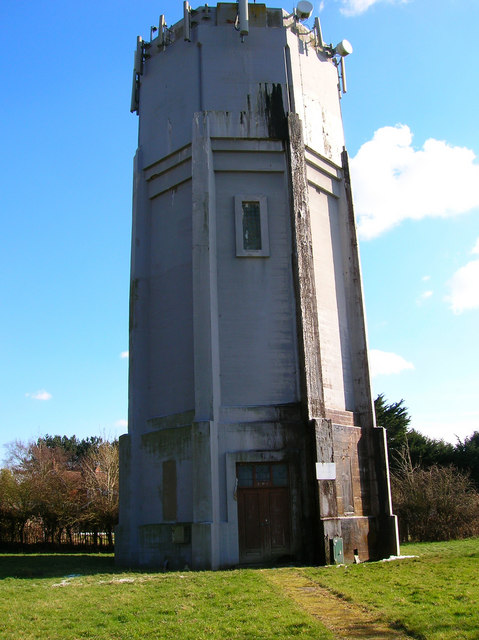
Old Water Tower, Friston

Friston is a village and civil parish in the East Suffolk district, in the county of Suffolk, England. It is three miles (5 km) southeast of Saxmundham, its post town, and four miles (6 km) northwest of Aldeburgh. The River Alde bounds the village on the south. The surrounding land is chiefly arable. The soil becomes partly marshy in the lower grounds. The village is noted for its early nineteenth century post mill. It is located next to the village of Knodishall. In 2011 the parish had a population of 344.

In 1887, John Bartholomew described Friston as:

Friston, par. and vil., E. Suffolk, 3 miles SE. of Saxmundham, 1846 ac., pop. 385; P.O.; in NW. vicinity of vil. is Friston Hall.

== History ==
The village's name is recorded in the Domesday Book as Frisetuna and seems to come from Old English Frīsa tūn ('the farmstead of the Frisians'). Some Frisians may have come with the Angles and Saxons during the Anglo-Saxon settlement of Britain. An alternative name for the parish is Freston.

Thomas Bacon owned Friston Hall until he sold it in 1674.

On 1 April 1934 Hazlewood was abolished part of it became part of Friston.

From 1894 to 1934 it was in Plomesgate Rural District, from 1934 it was in Blyth Rural District, until 1974 it was in East Suffolk administrative county. From 1974 it was in Suffolk Coastal district, in 2019 it became part of East Suffolk district.

== Population ==
According to the census in 2011, the parishes male population was 164 and the female population was 180. The historical reports show that Friston's total population in 1841 was 455 with 210 people being under 20 and 245 people being 20 years and upwards indicating the parishes young population. The population graph from 1801 to 2011 shows an increase in population from 1801 to 1850 where it declined to just under 400 people. After this point the population of Friston fluctuated but continued increasing before the huge decline in the village's population around the 1970s which was common in most rural areas due to people migrating to metropolitan areas with higher accessibility for social and economic activities.

== Industry ==
The 1881 occupational graph demonstrates that the most common occupations for men were in agriculture and commodities with approximately 30 men working in each of these occupations. The second most popular occupation was house construction with 9 men working in that occupation. Females occupations differ in comparison with 17 females employed in domestic services such as transporters of messages and 56 females without specified occupations suggesting they worked around their homes.

== Community ==
Friston is located in a rural area close to the sea, rivers and woodland area. Friston is close to a famous bird sanctuary in Minsmere and is also home to its own wind mill dating back to the 19th century called 'Frison Post Mill'. The village has its own church, called St Mary's Church. The village which once had nine shops has now seen closure to its school and its post office; it is however close to surrounding towns with shops and supermarkets. There are two cinemas and a theatre within four miles of the village. Friston has a village Parish Council which hosts an annual general meeting with its seven members and the clerk. The village has a thriving pub called 'Old Chequers Pub' with a traditional log burner and was referred to as a 'community asset' after fears of it being sold for residential development in 2014.

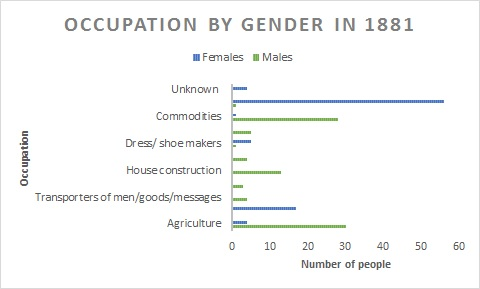
Occupation of Friston's population by gender, 1881

== Church ==
The Church at Friston, called St Mary's Church dates back to the Norman period with the main body of the church dating back to the 14th century. The church is built with a nave, chancel, west tower and south porch which is the ideal parish church plan. The Church contains a Tudor Bible written in 1550 and is possibly the first bible to have ever been used in St Mary's church. The church also has a churchyard which has several graves of the Bowater family members, of which three were Lord Mayors of London.

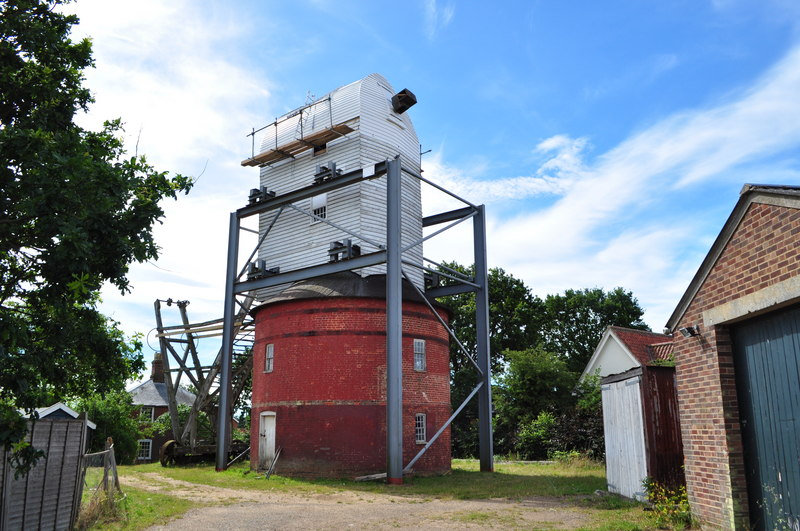
Friston Post Mill

== Friston Post Mill ==
Friston post mill was built in 1812 and is the tallest of its type in England. It was said to have been built by John Collins before getting sold to Joseph Colling of Bramfield and then getting sold to John Wells of Halesworth for £40 in 1813. The Mill has been repaired ever since it was built, in 1976 there were 7 major repairs because it was affected by Deathwatch beetle infestation. The Mill was updated in August 1983 and was described as:

Post Windmill, Early C19; partly restored 1977. Timber framed and weatherboarded body on 3-storey painted brick roundhouse. Fantain and sails removed. The principal machinery, which drove 3 pairs of millstones, remains intact. An outstanding landmark.
