= Plomesgate Rural District =

Former rural district in East Suffolk, England

Coordinates: 52.17°N 1.42°E

Plomesgate
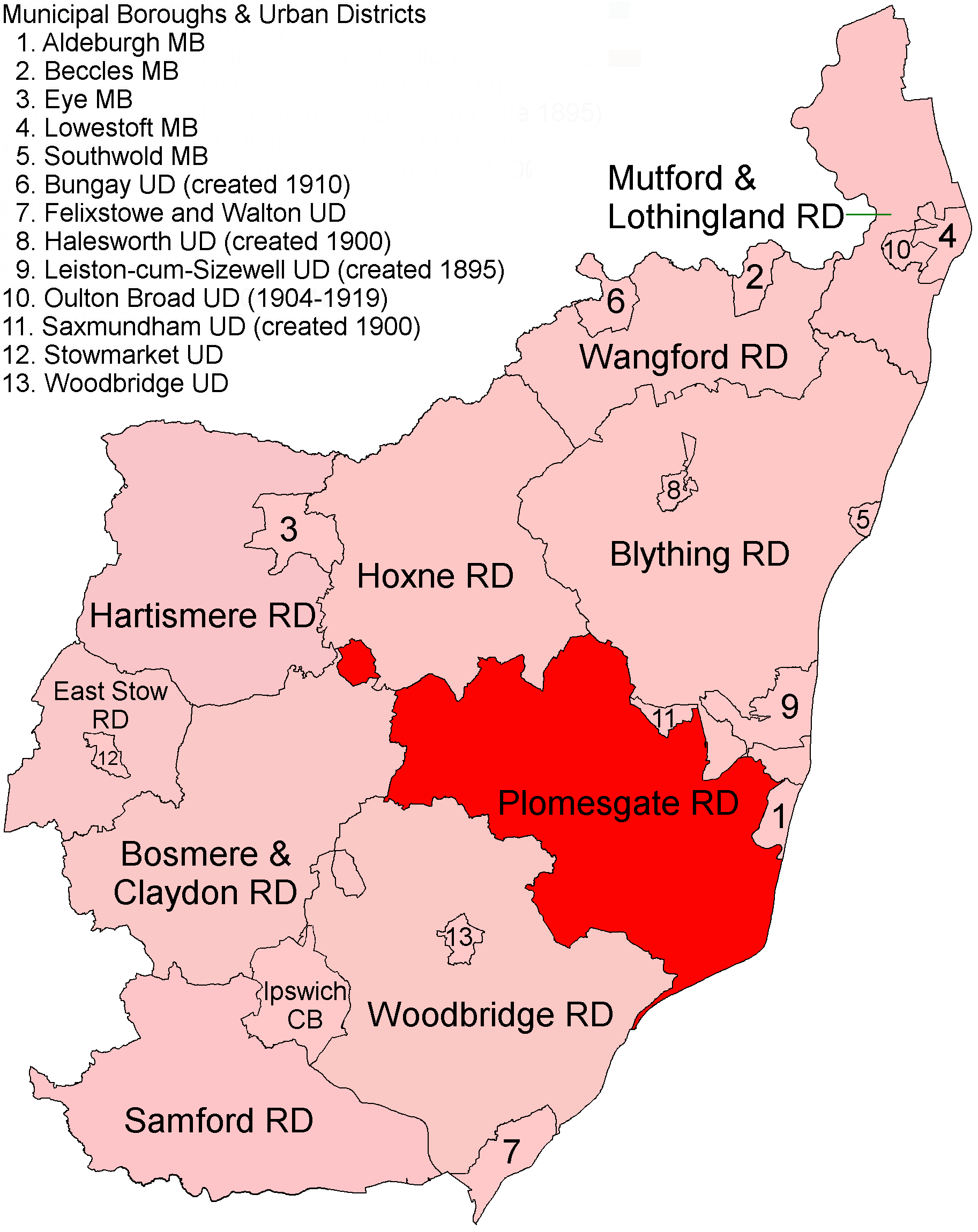
- Location within East Suffolk, 1894
- History
  - Created: 28 December 1894
  - Abolished: 31 March 1934
  - Succeeded by: Blyth Rural District and Deben Rural District
- Status: Rural district
  - HQ: Plomesgate House, Chapel Lane, Wickham Market

Plomesgate Rural District was a rural district within the administrative county of East Suffolk between 1894 and 1934.

== History ==
The district had its origins in the Plomesgate Poor Law Union, which had been created in 1835. It was named after the historic hundred of Plomesgate, although it covered a significantly larger area that included most, but not all, of the historic hundred. A workhouse was built to serve the poor law union in 1836–1837 on Chapel Lane in Wickham Market. In 1872, sanitary districts were established, with responsibility for public health and local government given to the boards of guardians of poor law unions for areas without urban authorities. The Plomesgate Rural Sanitary District initially covered the same area as the Plomesgate Poor Law Union, but in 1885 the town of Aldeburgh became a municipal borough and thereafter formed its own urban sanitary district.

Under the Local Government Act 1894, rural sanitary districts became rural districts on 28 December 1894. Plomesgate Rural District Council held its first meeting on 31 December 1894 at the Plomesgate Union Workhouse (later known as Plomesgate House) in Wickham Market. George Walker, the previous chairman of the board of guardians, was appointed the first chairman of the council. Plomesgate House served as the council's meeting place throughout the period the council existed.

In 1900 the parish of Saxmundham was made an urban district, removing it from the Plomesgate Rural District.

In 1934, under a County Review Order, Plomesgate Rural District was abolished and most of its parishes transferred to the new Blyth and Deben Rural Districts. The parish of Kenton, which was detached from the rest of the Plomesgate Rural District, became part of Hartismere Rural District. The parish of Hazlewood was abolished at the same time, being split between the parish of Friston (which went to Blyth Rural District) and the borough of Aldeburgh.

== Noted People ==
- Grizelda Hervey, (born Plomesgate, 1901), film (Kiss the Blood Off my Hands),, and radio Appointment with Fear (radio) actress; wife to Clarence Bruce, 3rd Baron Aberdare.

== Statistics ==
| Year | Area | | Population | Density (pop/ha) |
| Year | acres | ha | Population | Density (pop/ha) |
|---|---|---|---|---|
| 1911 | 72,629 | 29,392 | 15,708 | 0.53 |
| 1921 | 72,629 | 29,392 | 14,940 | 0.51 |
| 1931 | 72,629 | 29,392 | 13,967 | 0.48 |

== Parishes ==
Plomesgate Rural District comprised the following civil parishes:

| Parish | From | To | Subsequent district | Notes |
|---|---|---|---|---|
| Benhall | 28 Dec 1894 | 31 Mar 1934 | Blyth RD | |
| Blaxhall | 28 Dec 1894 | 31 Mar 1934 | Deben RD | |
| Brandeston | 28 Dec 1894 | 31 Mar 1934 | Blyth RD | |
| Bruisyard | 28 Dec 1894 | 31 Mar 1934 | Blyth RD | |
| Butley | 28 Dec 1894 | 31 Mar 1934 | Deben RD | |
| Campsey Ash | 28 Dec 1894 | 31 Mar 1934 | Deben RD | |
| Chillesford | 28 Dec 1894 | 31 Mar 1934 | Deben RD | |
| Cransford | 28 Dec 1894 | 31 Mar 1934 | Blyth RD | |
| Cretingham | 28 Dec 1894 | 31 Mar 1934 | Deben RD | |
| Earl Soham | 28 Dec 1894 | 31 Mar 1934 | Blyth RD | |
| Easton | 28 Dec 1894 | 31 Mar 1934 | Blyth RD | |
| Eyke | 28 Dec 1894 | 31 Mar 1934 | Deben RD | |
| Farnham | 28 Dec 1894 | 31 Mar 1934 | Blyth RD | |
| Framlingham | 28 Dec 1894 | 31 Mar 1934 | Blyth RD | |
| Friston | 28 Dec 1894 | 31 Mar 1934 | Blyth RD | |
| Gedgrave | 28 Dec 1894 | 31 Mar 1934 | Deben RD | |
| Great Glemham | 28 Dec 1894 | 31 Mar 1934 | Blyth RD | |
| Hacheston | 28 Dec 1894 | 31 Mar 1934 | Blyth RD | |
| Havergate Island | 28 Dec 1894 | 31 Mar 1934 | Deben RD | |
| Hazlewood | 28 Dec 1894 | 31 Mar 1934 | abolished | Parish abolished same time as Plomesgate Rural District, being split between Aldeburgh Municipal Borough and Friston parish in Blyth Rural District. |
| Hoo | 28 Dec 1894 | 31 Mar 1934 | Deben RD | |
| Iken | 28 Dec 1894 | 31 Mar 1934 | Deben RD | |
| Kenton | 28 Dec 1894 | 31 Mar 1934 | Hartismere RD | |
| Kettleburgh | 28 Dec 1894 | 31 Mar 1934 | Blyth RD | |
| Letheringham | 28 Dec 1894 | 31 Mar 1934 | Deben RD | |
| Little Glemham | 28 Dec 1894 | 31 Mar 1934 | Blyth RD | |
| Marlesford | 28 Dec 1894 | 31 Mar 1934 | Blyth RD | |
| Monewden | 28 Dec 1894 | 31 Mar 1934 | Deben RD | |
| Orford | 28 Dec 1894 | 31 Mar 1934 | Deben RD | |
| Parham | 28 Dec 1894 | 31 Mar 1934 | Blyth RD | |
| Rendham | 28 Dec 1894 | 31 Mar 1934 | Blyth RD | |
| Rendlesham | 28 Dec 1894 | 31 Mar 1934 | Deben RD | |
| Saxmundham | 28 Dec 1894 | 30 Sep 1900 | Saxmundham UD | Became an urban district on 1 October 1900. |
| Snape | 28 Dec 1894 | 31 Mar 1934 | Blyth RD | |
| Sternfield | 28 Dec 1894 | 31 Mar 1934 | Blyth RD | |
| Stratford St Andrew | 28 Dec 1894 | 31 Mar 1934 | Blyth RD | |
| Sudbourne | 28 Dec 1894 | 31 Mar 1934 | Deben RD | |
| Swefling | 28 Dec 1894 | 31 Mar 1934 | Blyth RD | |
| Tunstall | 28 Dec 1894 | 31 Mar 1934 | Deben RD | |
| Wantisden | 28 Dec 1894 | 31 Mar 1934 | Deben RD | |
| Wickham Market | 28 Dec 1894 | 31 Mar 1934 | Deben RD | |
