= Henham, Suffolk =

Former civil parish in Suffolk, England

Coordinates: 52.349053°N 1.5997968°E

Henham
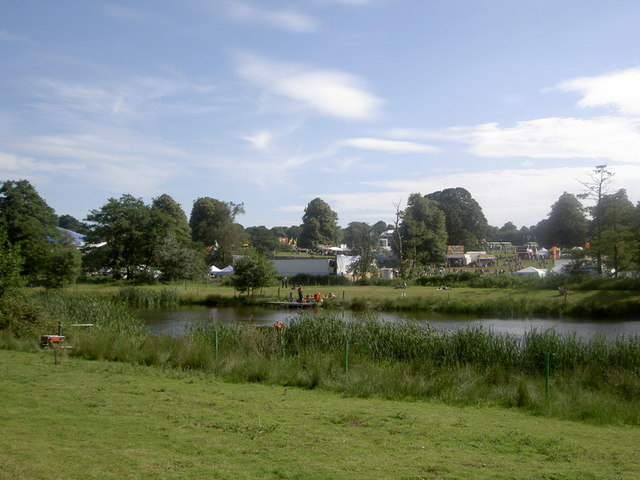

- Location within Suffolk
- Civil parish: Wangford with Henham
- District: East Suffolk
- Shire county: Suffolk
- Region: East
- Country: England
- Sovereign state: United Kingdom

Henham is a former civil parish now in the parish of Wangford with Henham, in the East Suffolk district, in the county of Suffolk, England. In 1961 the parish had a population of 90. The majority of the parish was covered by Henham Park.

== History ==
The name "Henham" means 'High homestead/village'. Henham was recorded in the Domesday Book as Henham. At this time Ralph Baynard had the lordship. This subsequently passed to Robert Kerdeston remaining in his family until about 1440. It then passed to the de la Pole family.

Historically it was in the Blything Hundred and in the Deanery of Dunwich, (Dunwich North for the period 1868 to 1914, when that deanery was administratively divided in three).

There are some medieval remains of Henham village along with a moat and church located in Tuttles Wood.

Under the Poor Law Amendment Act 1866 Henham became a civil parish in 1866. At the same time the hamlet of Wangford also became a distinct civil parish, but without ecclesiastical status.

== Abolition ==
On 1 April 1987 the parish was abolished and merged with Wangford to form "Wangford with Henham".
