= Wangford =

Village in Suffolk, England

Coordinates: 52.355°N 1.622°E

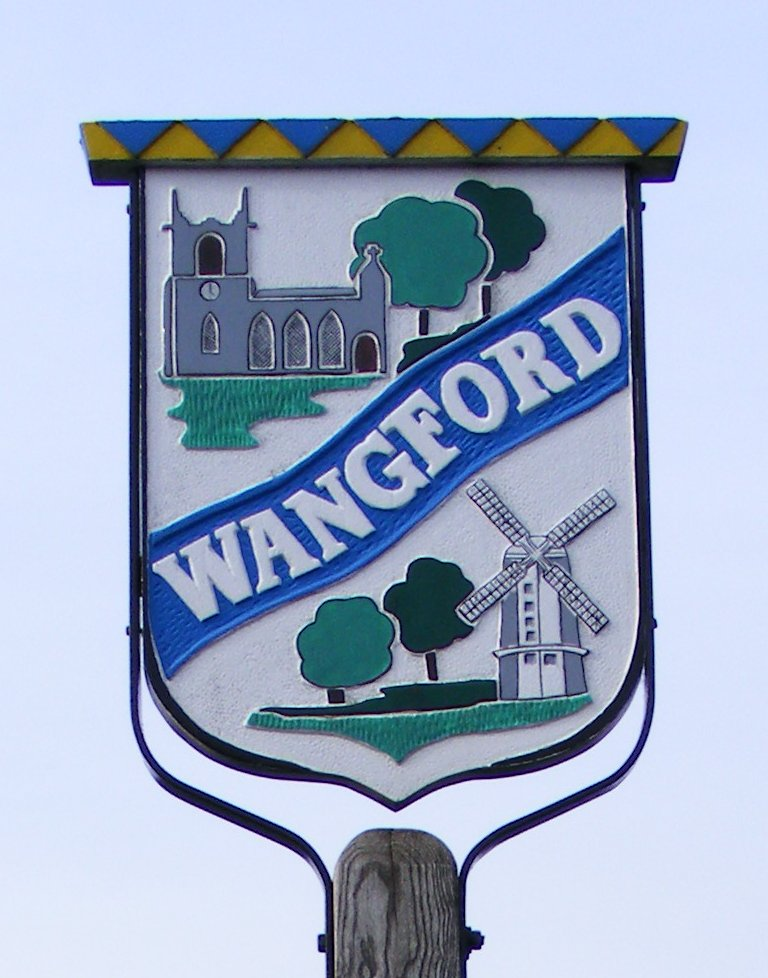
- Wangford

- Location within Suffolk
- Population: 591 (2011)
- OS grid reference: TM465795
- Civil parish: Wangford with Henham
- District: East Suffolk
- Shire county: Suffolk
- Region: East
- Country: England
- Sovereign state: United Kingdom
- Post town: BECCLES
- Postcode district: NR34
- Dialling code: 01502
- Police: Suffolk
- Fire: Suffolk
- Ambulance: East of England
- UK Parliament: Suffolk Coastal

Wangford is a village and former civil parish, now in the parish of Wangford with Henham, in the East Suffolk district, in the county of Suffolk, England, just off the A12 trunk road on the edge of the Henham Park estate just outside Southwold.

Wangford is connected to the rest of Suffolk by two main roads. At one side of the village the road leads straight on to the A12 (dual carriage way), and the other side of the village leads to Reydon, and Southwold (B1126).

In 1961 the civil parish had a population of 427. On 1 April 1987 the parish was merged with Henham to form "Wangford with Henham". Wangford with Henham has approximately 640 residents, reducing to 591 at the 2011 Census. and the main village covers about 50 acres (200,000 m^{2}).

At the centre of the village there is a community centre, containing a reasonably-sized hall, a bar, a kitchen and a small games room. There is also a shop, a pub (the Angel Inn), a farm shop, a playing field and allotments, tennis courts and the local vet's.

== History ==
At the dissolution of the monasteries, Wangford Priory was granted to Thomas Howard, 3rd Duke of Norfolk.

== The church of St Peter and St Paul ==
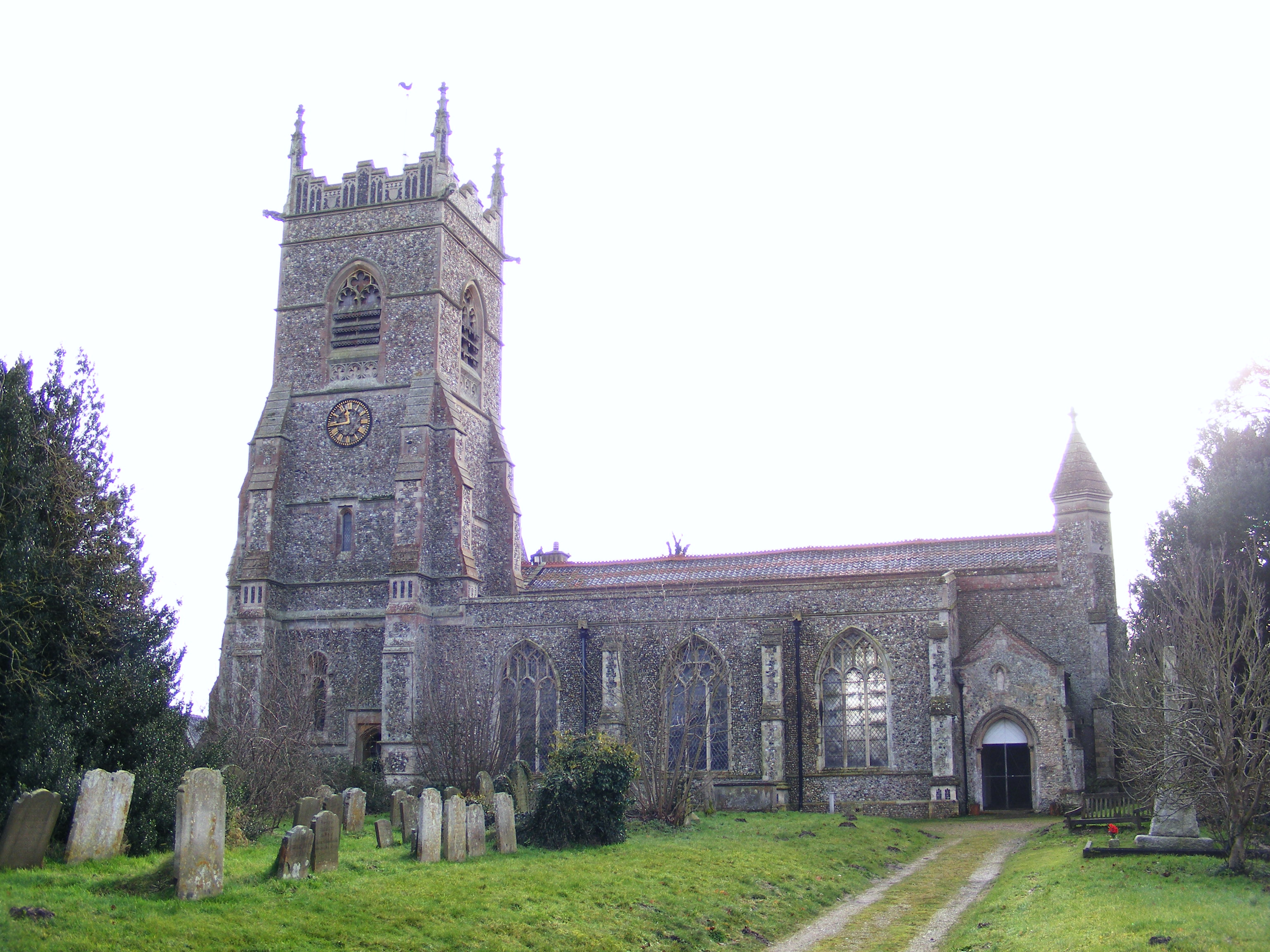
St Peter and St Paul's Church, Wangford

The Parish church of Wangford cum Henham is dedicated to St Peter and St Paul; situated near the centre of the village. The church here was near derelict by the mid-19th century. It was all that survived of a Cluniac Priory, a cell to the mother Priory at Thetford in Norfolk. Left derelict at the end of the 19th century, it was restored by the local Rous family, the Earls of Stradbroke who set about creating a monument to themselves here because there is no church in the parish of Henham. The architect was A. L. Blackburne. All was demolished except for the nave walls. A grand chancel was then built at the east end, and beside it in the 1870s, an impressive tower. The top of the tower is finished in the 14th-century Suffolk manner. It sits at the east end of the north aisle. Inside, the west end of the nave has a huge window, which may possibly be the rebuilding of a previous tower arch. The north porch is the only other medieval survival which seems to have had a side sliced off it by the buttress to the north aisle. As the church is principally 19th century, so is all the stained glass.

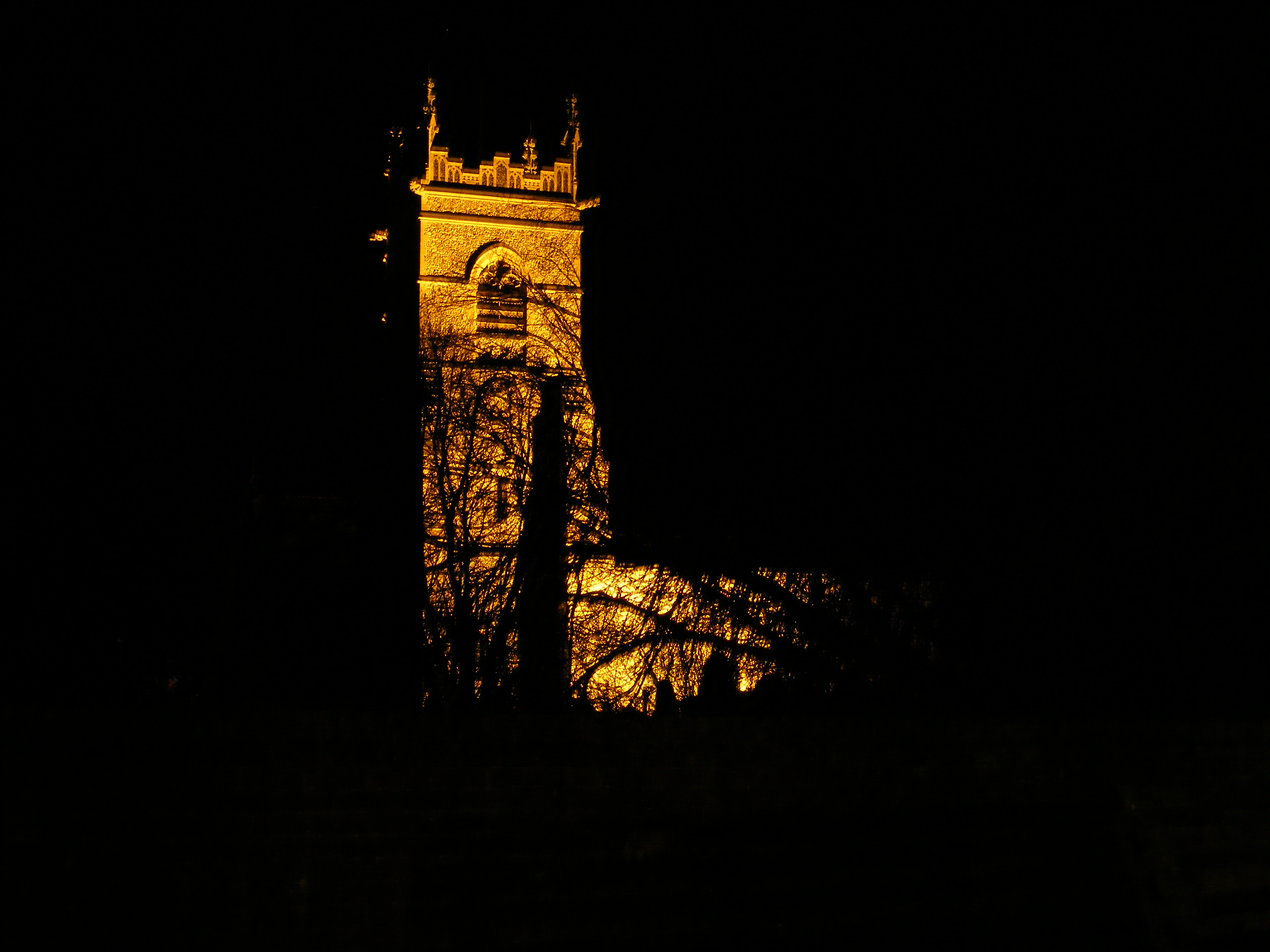
Wangford Church at night

Angels look down from the simple but effective roof. The lectern is made of brass, and the column is surrounded by angels about to take flight. The pulpit is 17th century and was brought here from the chapel at Henham Hall along with the reading desk. The font is 14th century but with a later cover. The walls are covered with memorials to the Rouses. The building is currently suffering from water damage but fundraising is continuing with the aim of reroofing. The Parish of Wangford is part of the Sole Bay Team Ministry (formed in 1999), along with the Parishes of Blythburgh, Reydon, Sotherton, South Cove, Southwold, Uggeshall and Walberswick.

=== The church bells of St Peter and St Paul ===
Wangford church has an unringable peal of five bells. Originally the bells were intended for change ringing. The bells hang in a derelict timber frame with dilapidated fittings and have not been rung for many years. The treble (the smallest) is the oldest bell in the tower, being cast by William Brend of Norwich in 1624. The following year, in 1625, the tenor (the largest) was cast at the same foundry by William & Alice Brend. The third was cast by John Darbie of Ipswich in 1668 and the fourth dates from 1721 and is by John Stephens of Norwich. The newest bell in the tower is the second which was cast by John Warner & Sons of London in 1863. This bell was recast from the metal of an earlier bell also cast by John Stephens. The precise weight of the bells is not known but the tenor is estimated to weigh between 8 and 9 hundredweight.

== Notable people and connections ==
- Wangford village provided the inspiration for the stage name of Sam Hutt, a well-known London gynaecologist who, as Hank Wangford, also performs spoof Country and Western music.
- Fred Copeman OBE, who served in the International Brigades in the Spanish Civil War and organised London's air raid defences during the Second World War, was born in Wangford Union Workhouse in 1907.

The annual Latitude Festival is held at Henham Hall Park nearby.

== Photos ==
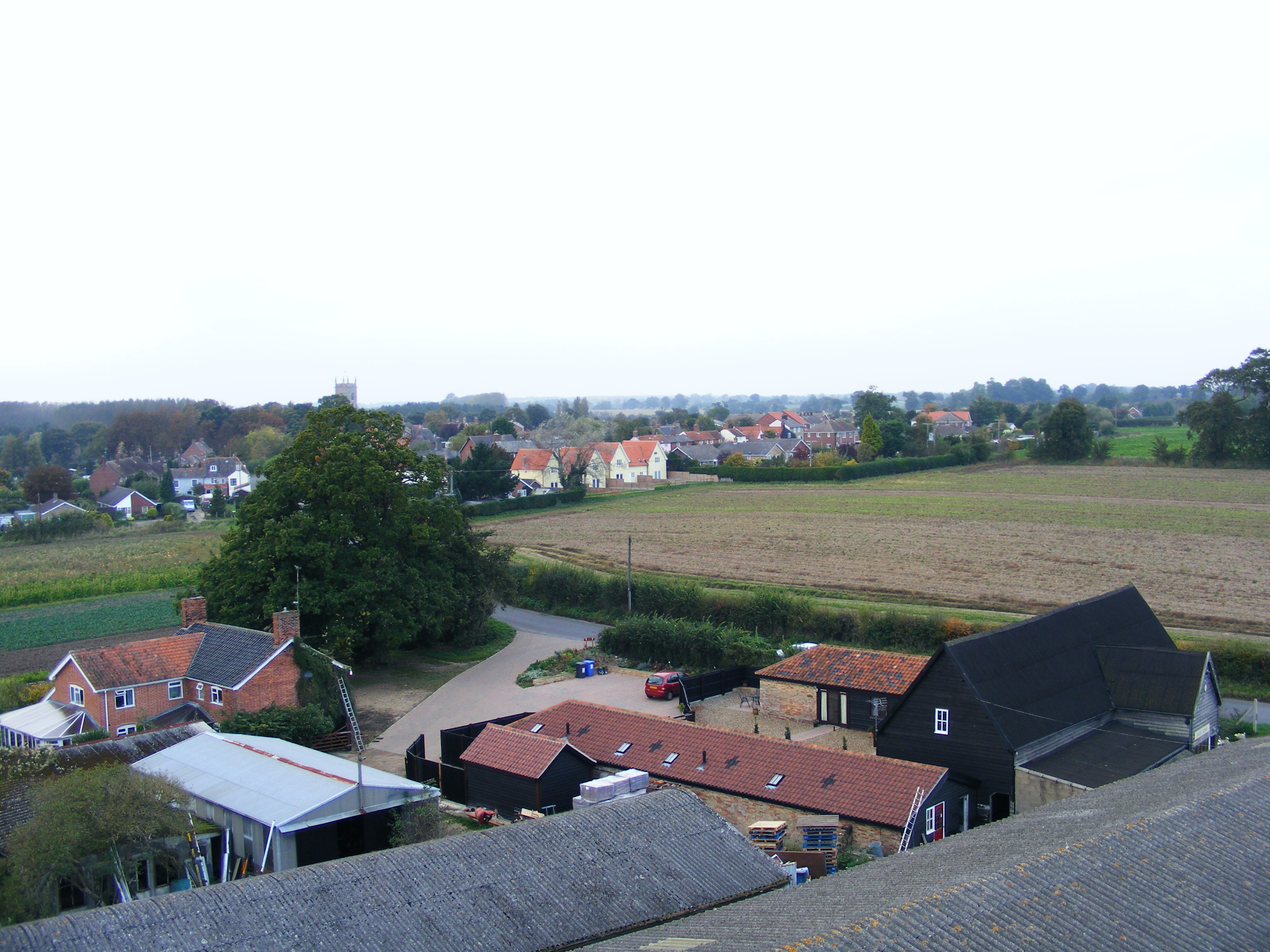
An aerial view of Wangford from the South East side of the village

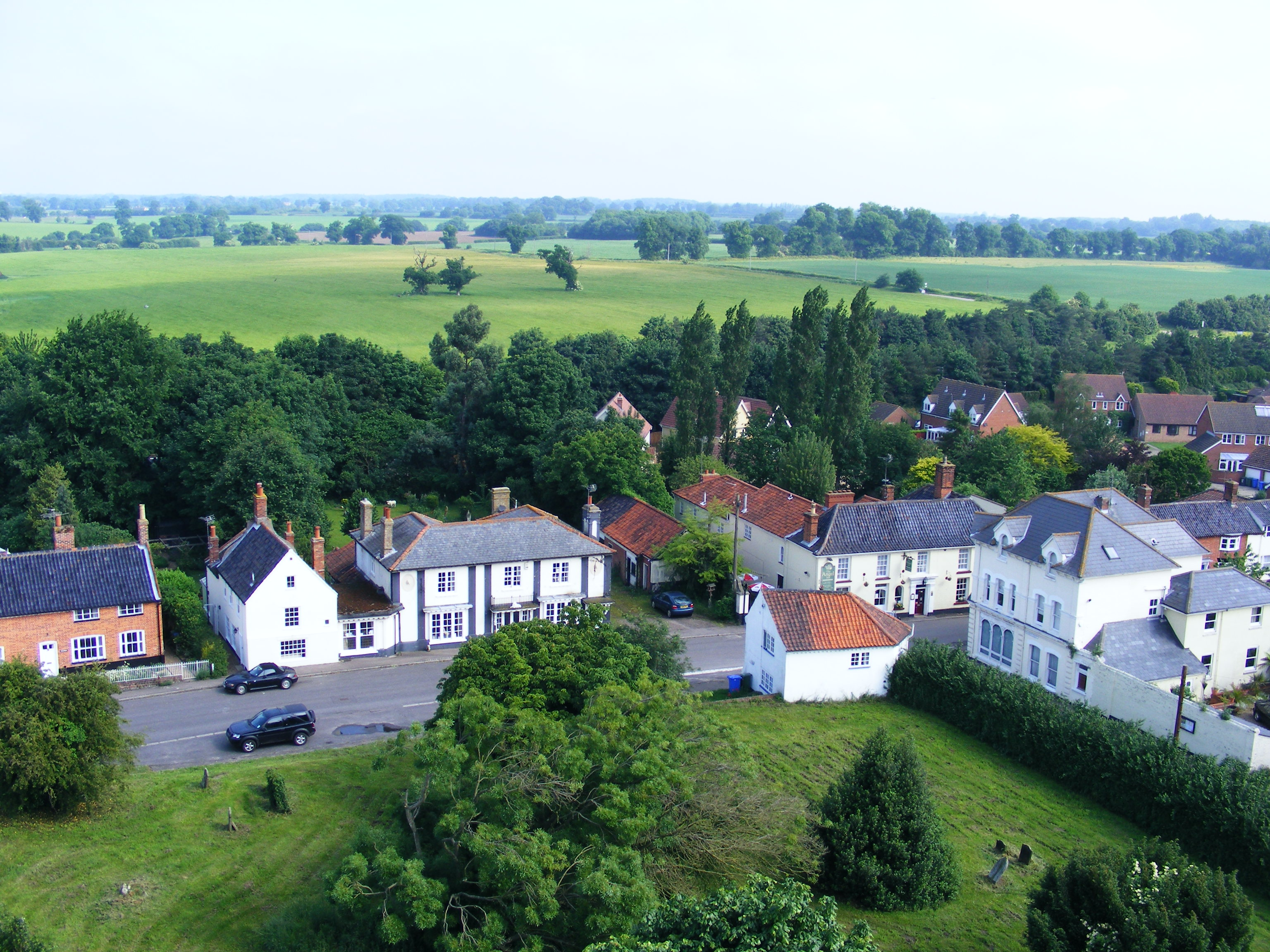
An aerial view of Wangford from the Church Tower

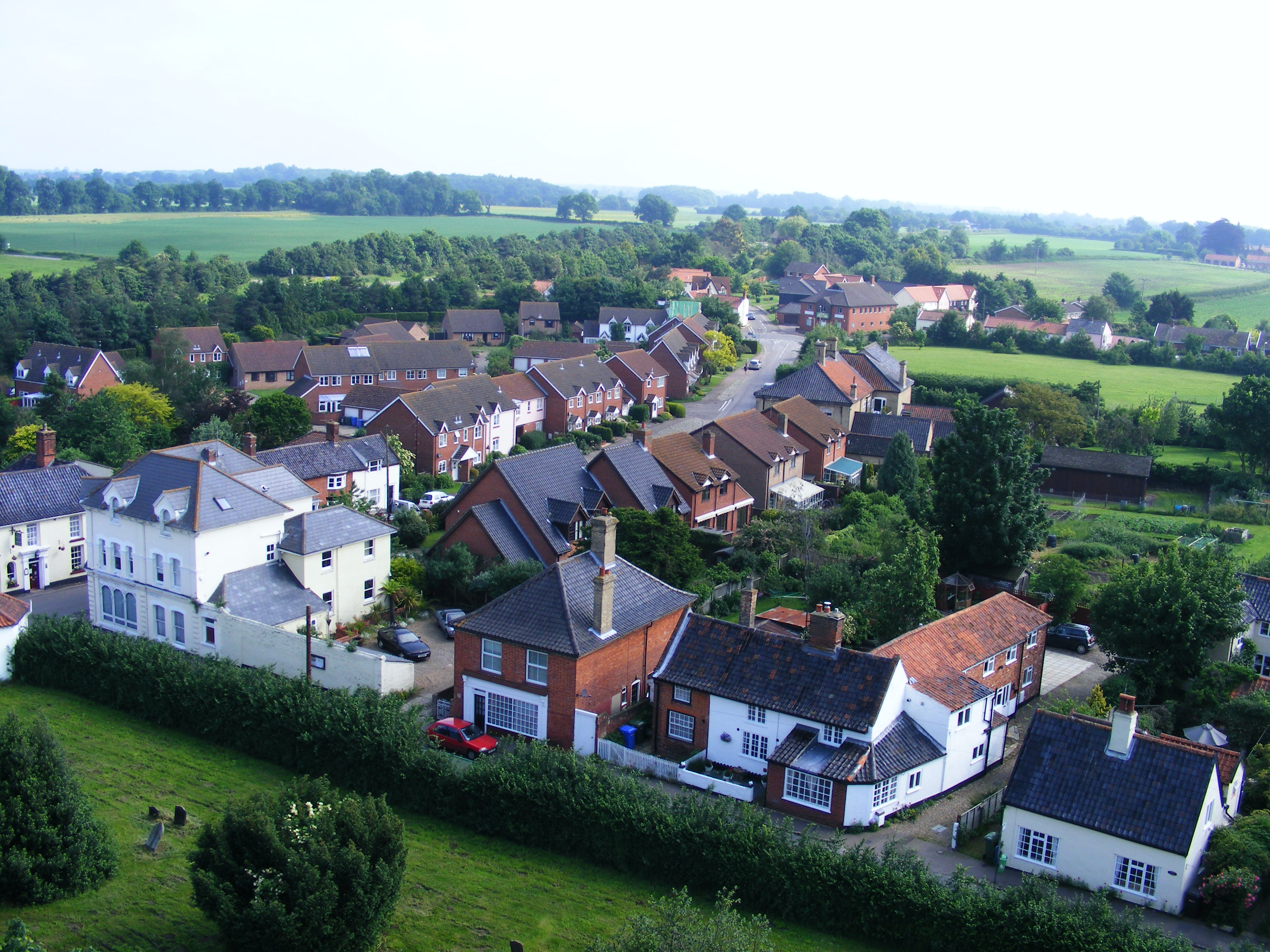
An aerial view of Wangford from the Church Tower

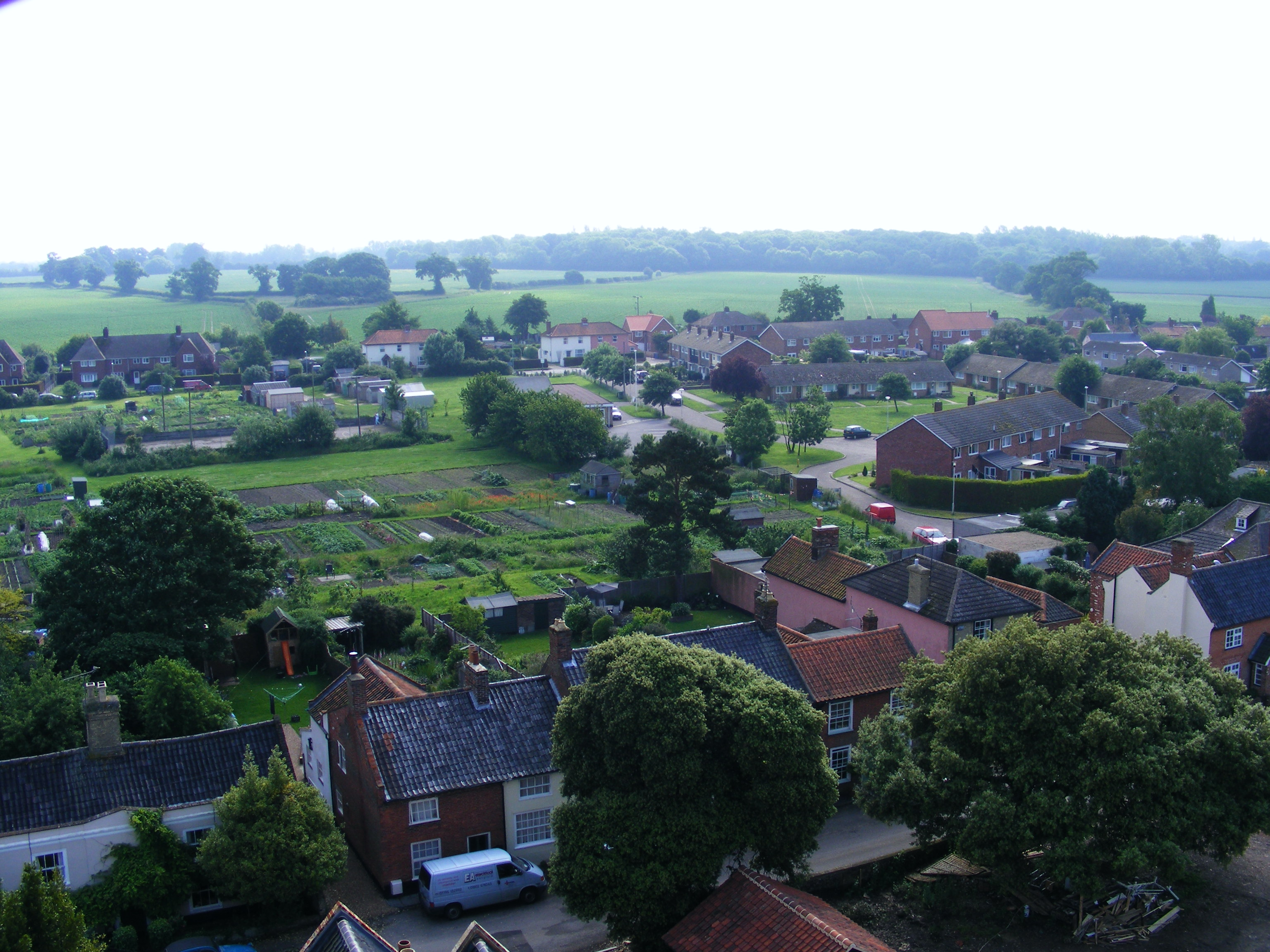
An aerial view of Wangford from the Church Tower

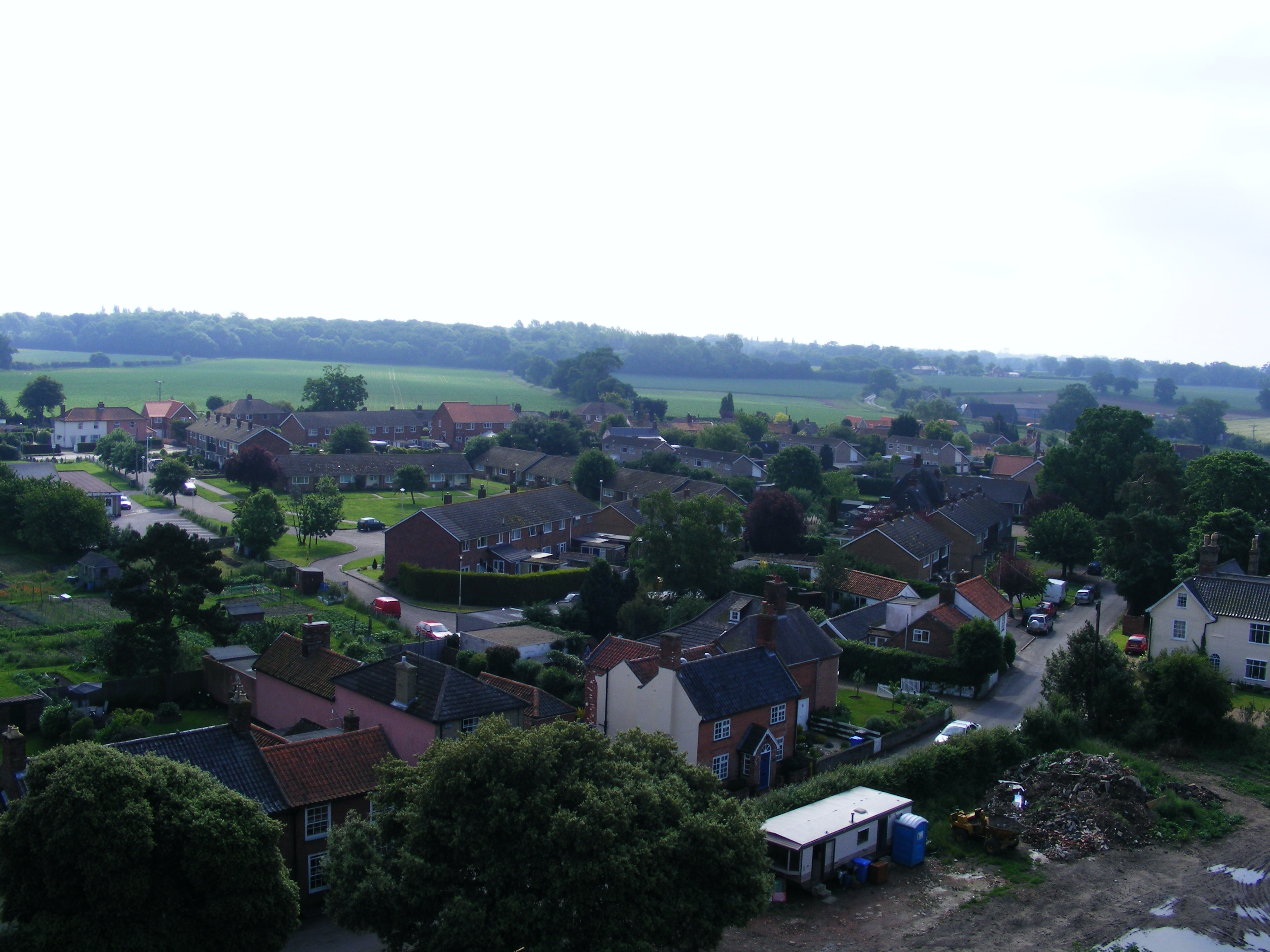
An aerial view of Wangford from the Church Tower

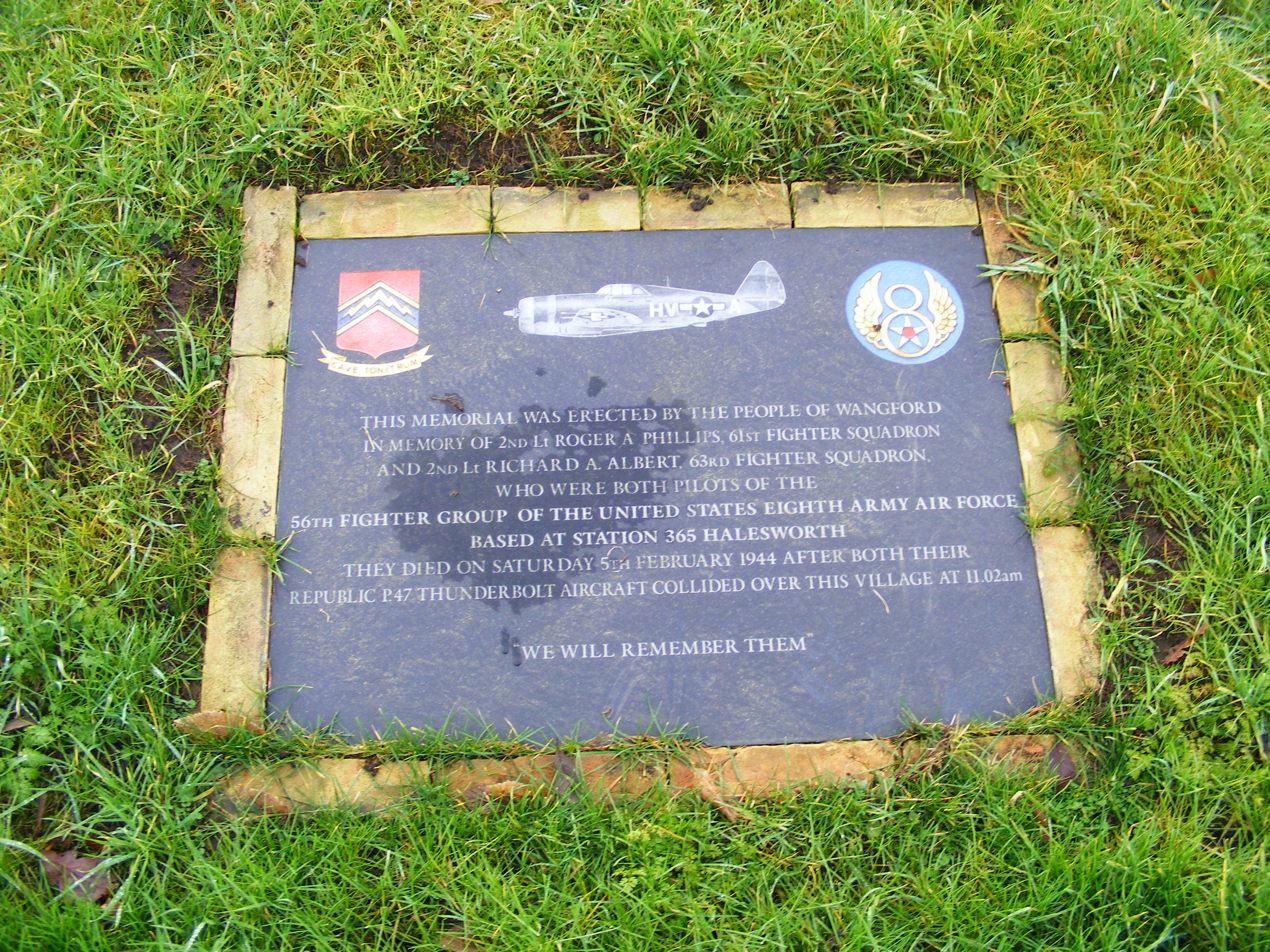
Wangford war memorial for two American airmen killed when their republic P47 Thunderbolts collided over the village on 05–02–1944

== See also ==
- Grand Henham Steam Rally
