= Brampton, Suffolk =

Village in Suffolk, England

Coordinates: 52.383°N 1.577°E

Brampton
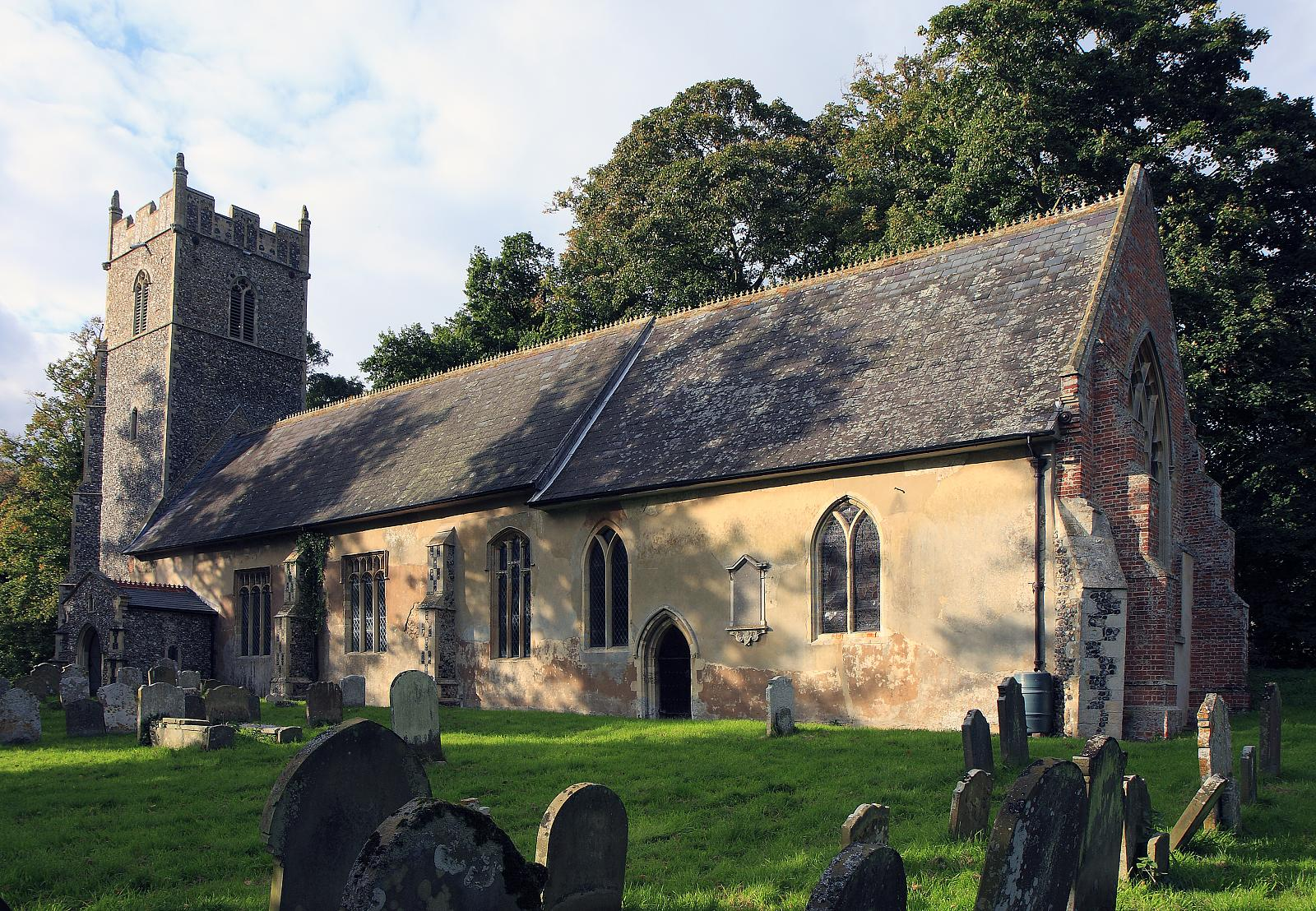
- Brampton church

- Location within Suffolk
- OS grid reference: TM435822
- Civil parish: Brampton with Stoven
- District: East Suffolk
- Shire county: Suffolk
- Region: East
- Country: England
- Sovereign state: United Kingdom
- Post town: Beccles
- Postcode district: NR34
- Dialling code: 01502
- UK Parliament: Suffolk Coastal

Brampton is a village and former civil parish, now in the parish of Brampton with Stoven, in the East Suffolk district, in the county of Suffolk, England. It is around 4 miles (6.4 km) north-east of Halesworth, 5 miles (8.0 km) south of Beccles and 5 miles (8.0 km) north-west of Southwold. In 1961 the parish had a population of 306. On 1 April 1987, the parish was merged with Stoven to form "Brampton with Stoven" parish and the mid-2005 population estimate for the expanded parish was 460.

Stoven is immediately to the east of Brampton, Uggeshall to the south-east and Shadingfield to the north. The village is served by Brampton railway station, a request stop around 1.5 miles (2.4 km) west of the village, on the Ipswich–Lowestoft East Suffolk Line. The A145 road divides the village and passes the village church which is Grade I listed and dedicated to St Peter. Areas of housing, including at Brampton Street, are clustered on either side of the road throughout the parish area. Brampton Primary School serves the village and the surrounding area.

Brampton Hall is a listed country house built in 1794 of red brick for Rev Naunton Thomas Orgill Leman and the Leman family who had long associations in the area. The previous Brampton Hall burned down in 1733. A 16th century farmhouse was built on the same site, known as Brampton Old Hall. Both buildings are Grade II listed.

== Notable residents ==
- Humphrey Primatt (1734 – c1776), clergyman and animal rights writer.
- Robert Leman (1799–1869), painter of landscapes and a member of the Norwich School of painters.
- Edward Robinson (1839–1913), Member of the Western Australian Legislative Council for North Province from 1894 to 1896.
- Thomas Curteis (1843–1914), first-class cricketer and clergyman.
