= Stoven =

Village in Suffolk, England

Coordinates: 52.379°N 1.595°E

Steven
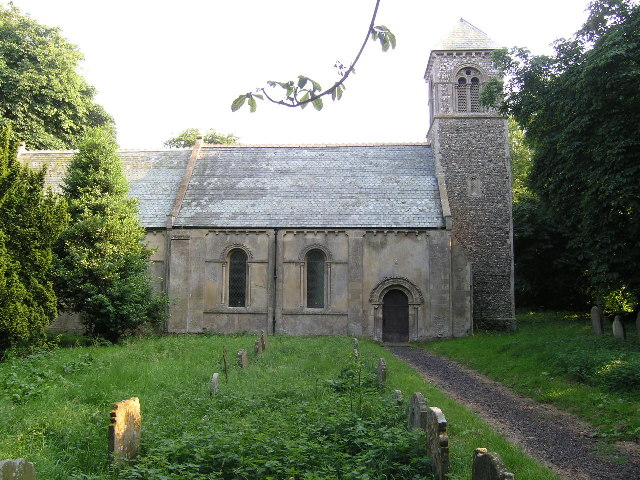
- St Margaret's Church

- Location within Suffolk
- Area: 3.25 km^{2} (1.25 sq mi)
- OS grid reference: TM448817
- Civil parish: Brampton with Stoven
- District: East Suffolk
- Shire county: Suffolk
- Region: East
- Country: England
- Sovereign state: United Kingdom
- Post town: Beccles
- Postcode district: NR34
- Dialling code: 01502
- UK Parliament: Suffolk Coastal

Stoven is a village and former civil parish now in the parish of Brampton with Stoven, in the East Suffolk district of the English county of Suffolk. It is located approximately 4.5 miles (7.2 km) north east of Halesworth and 5.5 miles (8.9 km) south of Beccles. In 1961 the parish had a population of 110. On 1 April 1987 the parish was abolished and merged with Brampton to form "Brampton with Stoven" and the population of the expanded parish was 427 at the 2011 United Kingdom census. Brampton is located just to the west, Uggeshall to the south and Sotterley to the north.

The parish church is dedicated to St Margaret and is a Grade II* listed building. It was threatened with demolition and sale in the late 1980s and early 1990s before being listed when its medieval structure was revealed. The church re-opened in 1996 and restoration work is believed to be ongoing.

Stoven has no services other than the church. Children attend primary school in Brampton and high school in Beccles. The local public house, a 17th-century Grade II listed building, re-opened in July 2008 after having been closed for three and a half years, but closed again in early 2011 and has been converted to residential use.
