= Blyford =

Village in Suffolk, England

Coordinates: 52.335°N 1.558°E

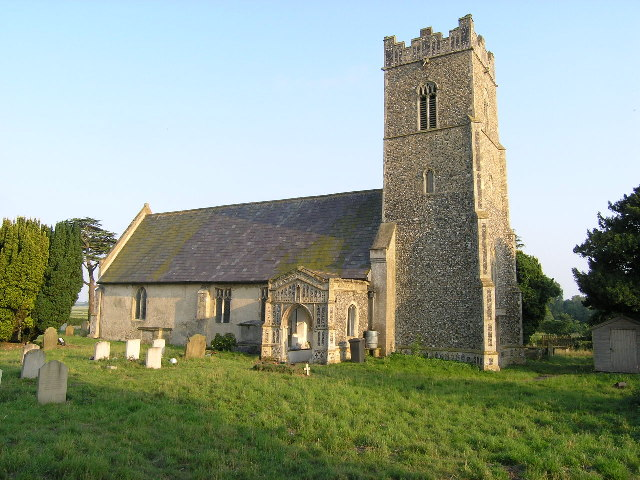
- Church of All Saints, Blyford

- Location within Suffolk
- Interactive map of Blyford
- Population: 110 (2001 census)
- OS grid reference: TM4276
- District: East Suffolk
- Shire county: Suffolk
- Region: East
- Country: England
- Sovereign state: United Kingdom
- Post town: Halesworth
- Postcode district: IP19

Blyford (formerly known as Blythford) is a village and civil parish in the East Suffolk district of Suffolk, England, about 3 miles (5 km) east of Halesworth and separated from Wenhaston by the River Blyth, Suffolk to the south. It is in the civil parish of Sotherton.

Population in 1801 was 163 and by 1840 had risen to 223. In 1861 the population was 193.

In 1870–72, John Marius Wilson's Imperial Gazetteer of England and Wales described Blyford like this:

Blyford, formerly Blythford, is a parish in Blything district, Suffolk; on the river Blythe, 2½ miles E by S of Halesworth r. station. Post Town, Halesworth. Acres, 947. Real property, £1,548. Pop., 193. Houses, 41. The living is a donative in the diocese of Norwich. Value, not reported. Patron, the Rev. Jeremy Day. The church, made of mainly flint, has two Norman doors and a perpendicular English tower, but is mainly decorated English.

On 9 August 2010, BBC Radio Suffolk reported at the 14th/15th century thatched Queen's Head Inn. The inn sign features St Etheldreda as the Queen. Chickens are located at the inn. The thatched roof was replaced in 1988 after a fire.

The church is just across the road from the inn with rumours of a smugglers' passage being located there. The church was built in 1088, with a 13th-century font added.
