= Darsham =

Coordinates: 52.274847°N 1.54237°E

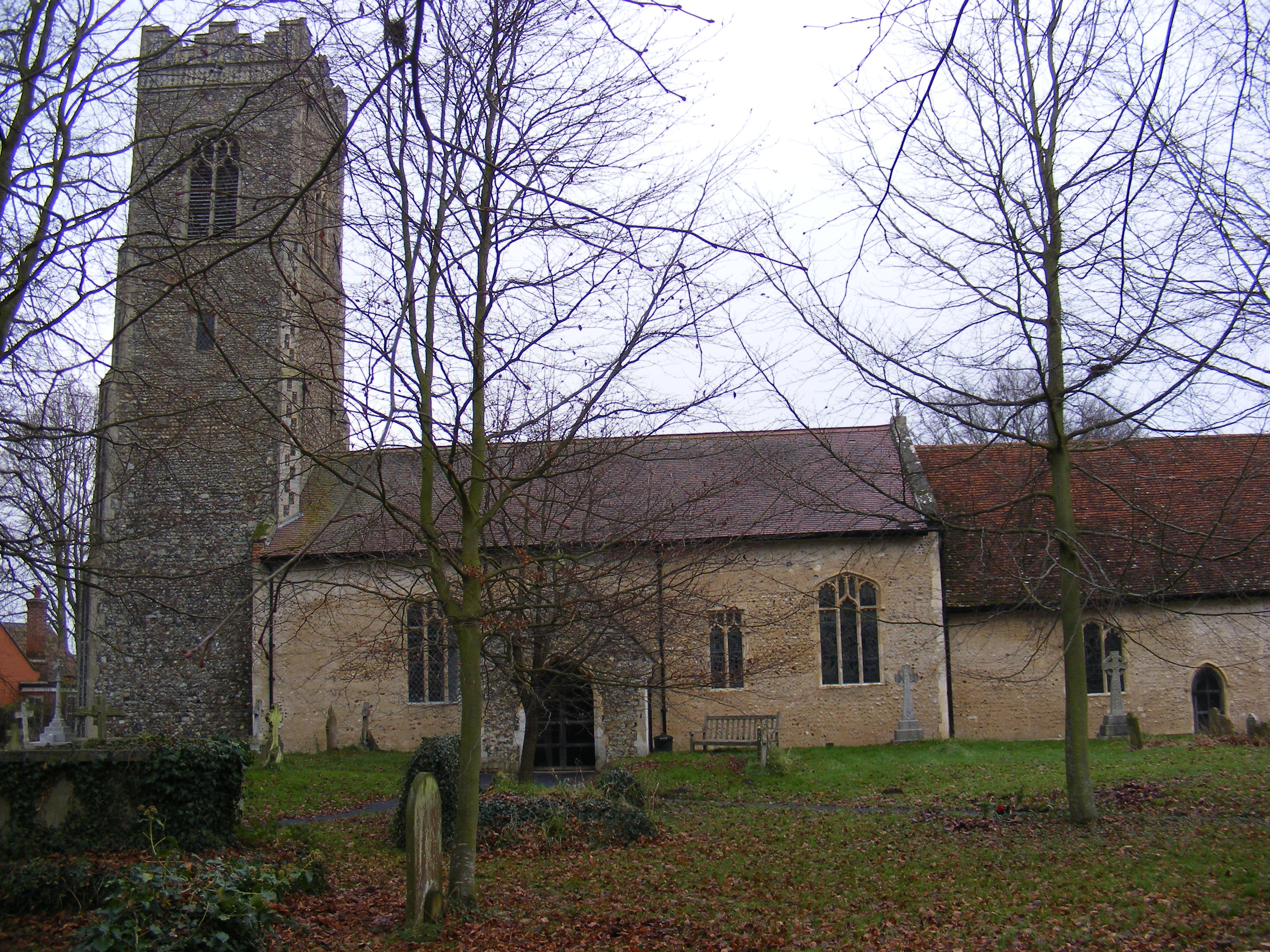
- Church of All Saints, Darsham

- Location within Suffolk
- Population: 300 (2011)
- District: East Suffolk
- Shire county: Suffolk
- Region: East
- Country: England
- Sovereign state: United Kingdom
- Post town: SAXMUNDHAM
- Postcode district: IP17
- Dialling code: 01728

Darsham is a village in Suffolk, England. It is located approximately 4 miles (6 km) north-east of Saxmundham. The village is bypassed by the A12 and is served by Darsham railway station, which is approximately one mile away from the village centre, on the Ipswich-Lowestoft East Suffolk Line.

The name of the village of Darsham derives from Deores Ham — home of the deer. This name is borne out by early reference to local roadways as chaseways. There was hunting in this area as late as the 18th century. Darsham is a mixed community with six farms. The village still has a pub, The Fox, however over the past few years the village has lost its school, shop and post office.

The garage on the A12, now primarily a petrol station, has a cafe and a shop. There is also a farm shop, a handmade tile factory, a pottery, a builder, an irrigation contractor, seed and feed merchants and a cafe, a private nursing home and a plant nursery with a shop and restaurant.

== History ==
The village gave its name to the Ham class minesweeper HMS Darsham.

In WW2, Darsham was the site of RAF High Street, situated just off the A144 road to Bramfield and Halesworth, an early radar station part of Chain Home which originated at Bawdsey Manor, in Suffolk. The High Street radar station had "Type 1 radar", 4 (Receive towers) of 240 ft made from wood and five (Transmit towers) of 360 ft made of steel. The wood towers stood in a close formation. The site later became a fireworks factory.

Further down the A12 towards Lowestoft there are a row of cottages, Optney Cottages, that used to be the Darsham Coaching Inn.

== Darsham Marshes Nature Reserve ==
Darsham Marshes is a nature reserve located south of the village. The reserve is 20 hectares (49 acres) in size and is owned and managed by Suffolk Wildlife Trust. The reserve consists of areas of marshland, meadow and fen land along the Minsmere River and is designated as a County Wildlife Site.
