= Linstead Parva =

Village in Suffolk, England

Coordinates: 52.349°N 1.427°E

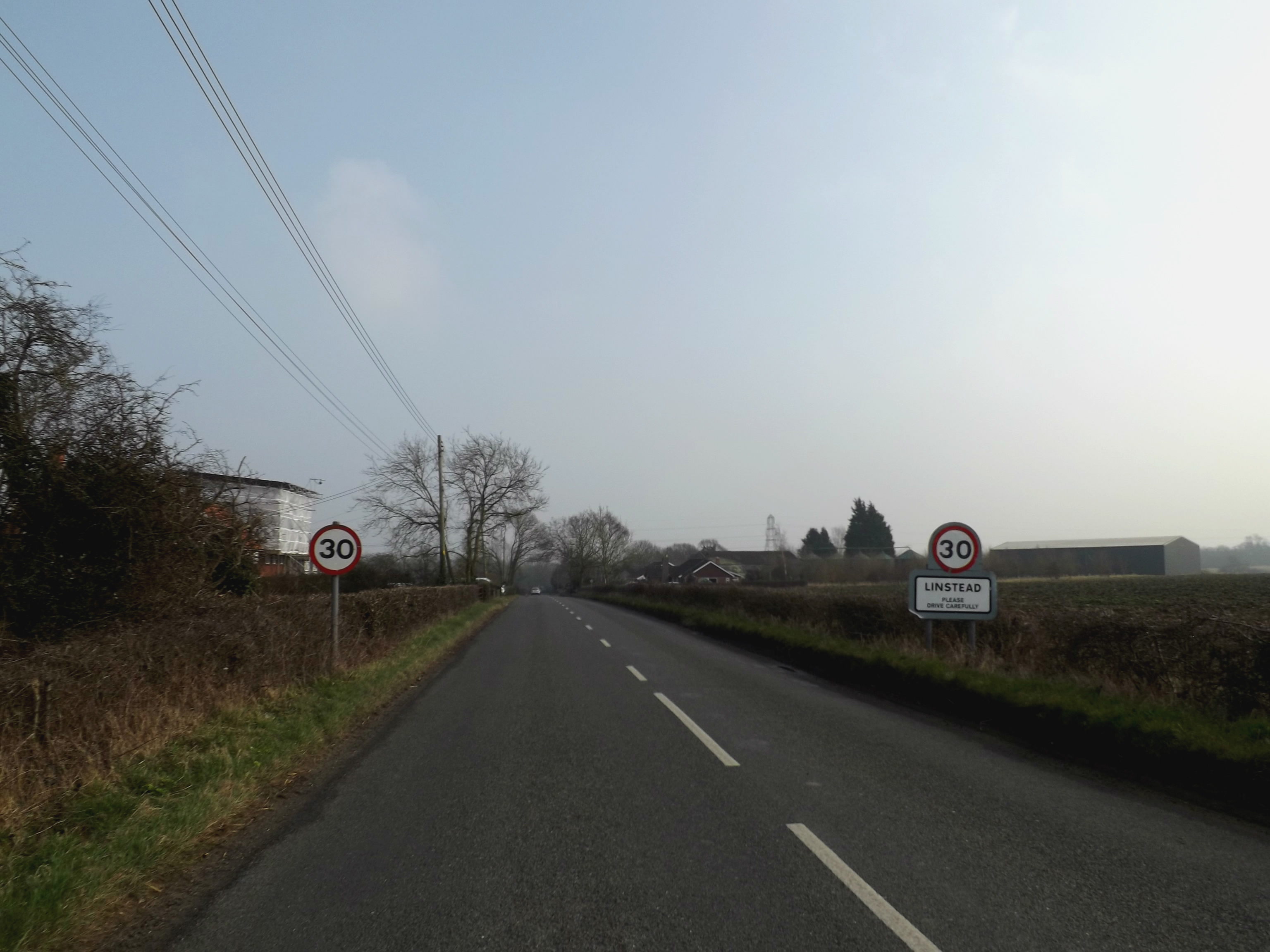
- Entering the village from Harleston

- Location within Suffolk
- Population: 132 (2011)
- District: East Suffolk
- Shire county: Suffolk
- Region: East
- Country: England
- Sovereign state: United Kingdom
- Post town: Halesworth
- Postcode district: IP19
- Police: Suffolk
- Fire: Suffolk
- Ambulance: East of England

Linstead Parva is a small village and civil parish in the East Suffolk district of Suffolk in eastern England. It has a small but notable 13th-century parish church, still in regular use. The village pub, The Greyhound, was already established and trading when referenced in 1874, but it closed permanently in March 1955, and is now a private dwelling.

== Population ==
In 2005 its population was 90. This had increased significantly to 132 at the 2011 Census, a 47% increase, caused by the combination of population statistics in 2011 for both Linsteads (Parva and Magna). In true terms, the population size of the village is stable.

Although "Parva" means smaller, Linstead Parva is today significantly larger than neighbouring Linstead Magna, which is now just a satellite hamlet.

== Ecclesiastical parish ==
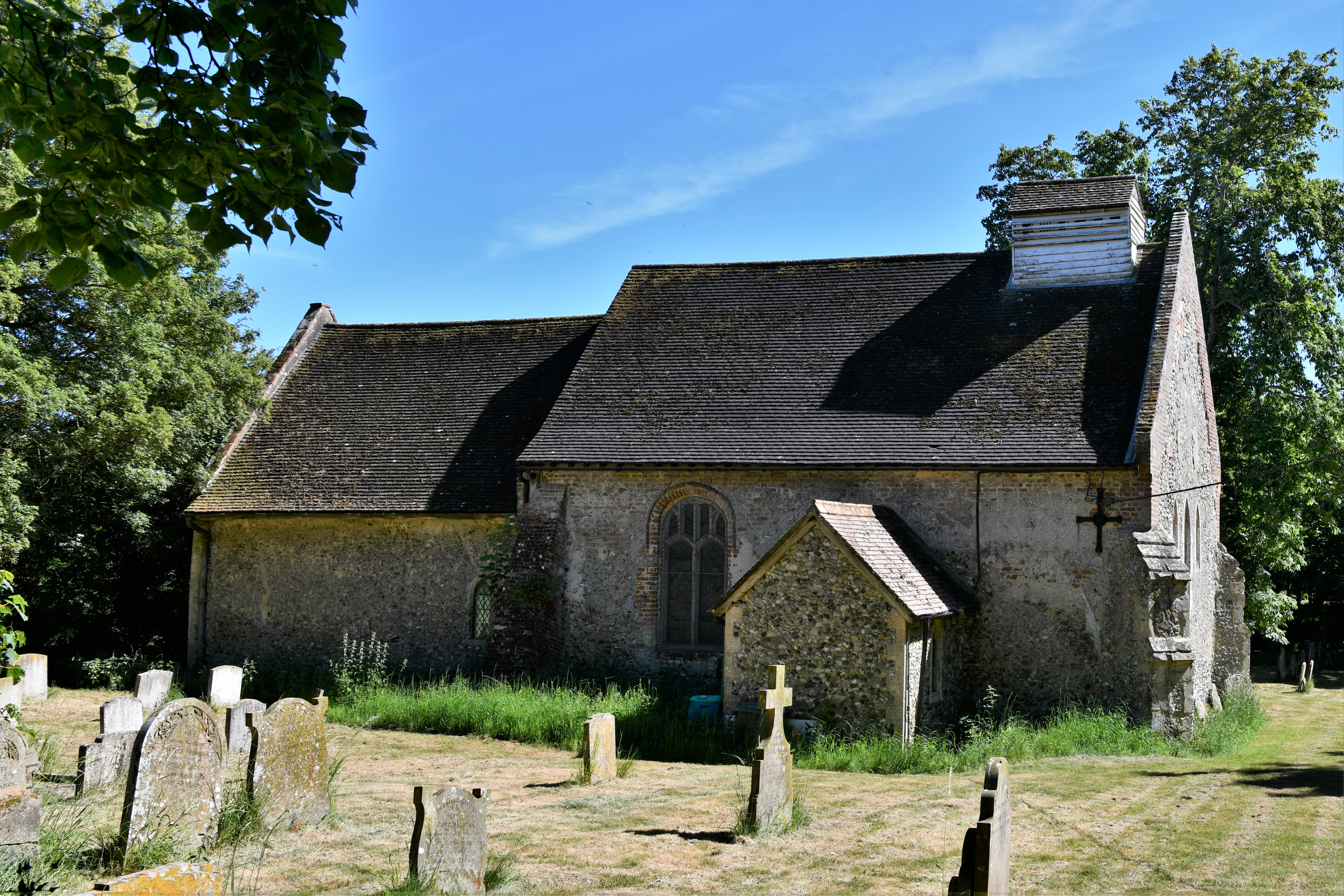
Church of St Margaret of Antioch

The parish church of Linstead (Parva and Magna) is in Linstead Parva, and dedicated to St Margaret of Antioch, an early Christian martyr. The 13th-century church building is well maintained and in regular use.

Historically the two Linsteads were separate parishes, with a church in Linstead Magna dedicated to St Peter. There is almost no trace of St Peter's Church today, and the two communities have been a single parish for centuries, but a procession is still held every two years to the site of St Peter's church in Church Farm, Linstead Magna.

Linstead Parva was also the possible birthplace of the pirate John Rackham.

In 1979 the parishes of the River Blyth, Suffolk were reorganised, with eight of them forming a large new team ministry, named the Halesworth Team Ministry. Linstead was incorporated into the new team. In 1996 three further parishes were added into the team, and in 1999 it was renamed the Blyth Valley Team Ministry. In 2020 three further parishes were added, giving 14 parishes and churches in the team.

== Civil parish ==
Linstead Parva shares a parish council with Linstead Magna and nearby Chediston.
