= Linstead Magna =

Civil parish in Suffolk, England

Coordinates: 52.340°N 1.406°E

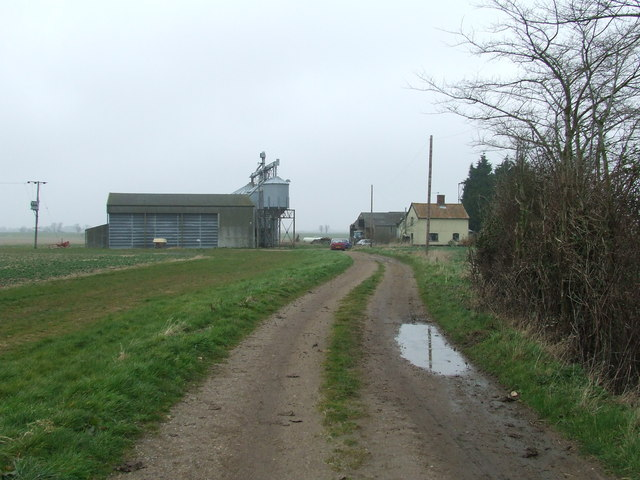
- Magna Farm

- Location within Suffolk
- Population: 60
- District: East Suffolk
- Shire county: Suffolk
- Region: East
- Country: England
- Sovereign state: United Kingdom
- Post town: Halesworth
- Postcode district: IP19
- Police: Suffolk
- Fire: Suffolk
- Ambulance: East of England

Linstead Magna is a civil parish in the East Suffolk district of Suffolk in eastern England.

== Population and civil parish ==
In 2005 its population was 60. It shares a civil parish council with nearby Chediston and Linstead Parva. At the 2011 Census the population was listed under Linstead Parva only. From 1974 to 2019 it was in Suffolk Coastal district.

== Parish church ==
The ancient parish church of Linstead Magna was dedicated to St Peter. The church fell into ruins many centuries ago, and almost no trace remains. The two Linstead parishes were combined, and now share the parish church of Linstead Parva (dedicated to St Margaret of Antioch). Nonetheless, a procession and open air service is held at the site of the church on Church Farm, Linstead Magna, every two years.
