= Chediston =

Village in Suffolk, England

Coordinates: 52.346762°N 1.463335°E

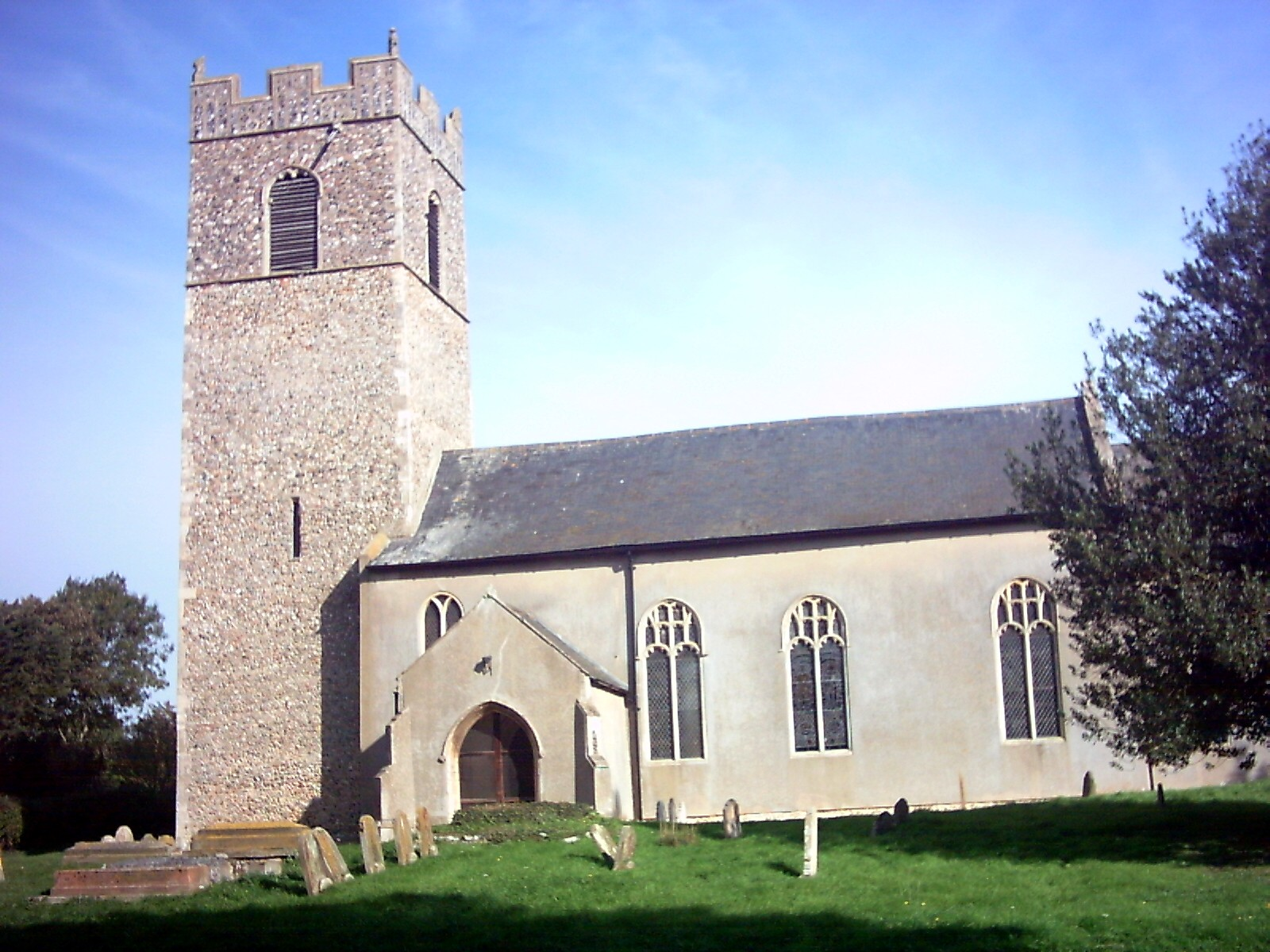
- Church of St Mary, Chediston

- Location within Suffolk
- Population: 195 (2011 Census)
- District: East Suffolk
- Shire county: Suffolk
- Region: East
- Country: England
- Sovereign state: United Kingdom
- Post town: HALESWORTH
- Postcode district: IP19
- Dialling code: 01986
- Police: Suffolk
- Fire: Suffolk
- Ambulance: East of England
- UK Parliament: Suffolk Coastal

Chediston is a village and a civil parish on the B1123 road, in the East Suffolk district, in the English county of Suffolk. It is located 2 miles west of Halesworth, its post town. The population of the civil parish as of the 2011 census was 195 and in 2018 it was estimated to be 234. Chediston shares a parish council with the nearby villages of Linstead Magna and Linstead Parva.

== History ==
Chediston, mentioned in the Domesday Book of 1086, and also known as Cedestan, Cheddeston, Sedestane and other variations, is thought to take its name from Saint Cedd (Cedd's town). Another possibility is that Cedd preached from a large stone (Cedd's stone) which can still be seen at Rockstone in Chediston. The parish was once administered by the Augustinian Order, based in Pentney, Norfolk, along with four other parishes.

== Sites ==
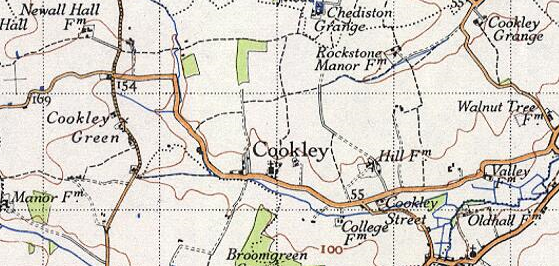
Historical map of the area

=== Cedd's Stone ===
Cedd's Stone, a large stone south of town located at Rockstone, is a large stone, once over 9 feet high, now mostly gone. The stone is said to have either been a Druidic sacrificial site or a sited dedicated to the Germanic god Woden / Odin, whose worship at the stone Bishop Cedd, who was in service of Æthelwold of East Anglia at the time, stamped out in 660AD. The stone is depicted as a hörgr/hearg with a large runestone and a sacred tree in the 2020 video game Assassin's Creed Valhalla.

=== Chediston Green ===
There is a dispersed settlement at Chediston Green lying about half a mile away from the church to the north. The pub at Chediston Green, named The Duke of Wellington, is now closed and has been converted into a private dwelling.

=== Parish church ===
Chediston has a parish church, dedicated to St Mary. The bulk of the current building dates from the 13th century and the 15th century, although there are traces of Norman stonework, and some Victorian restoration features, including much of the glass.

== Notable residents ==
- Walter Plumer, Member of Parliament for Aldeburgh
