= Sotherton =

Village in Suffolk, England

Coordinates: 52.359°N 1.584°E

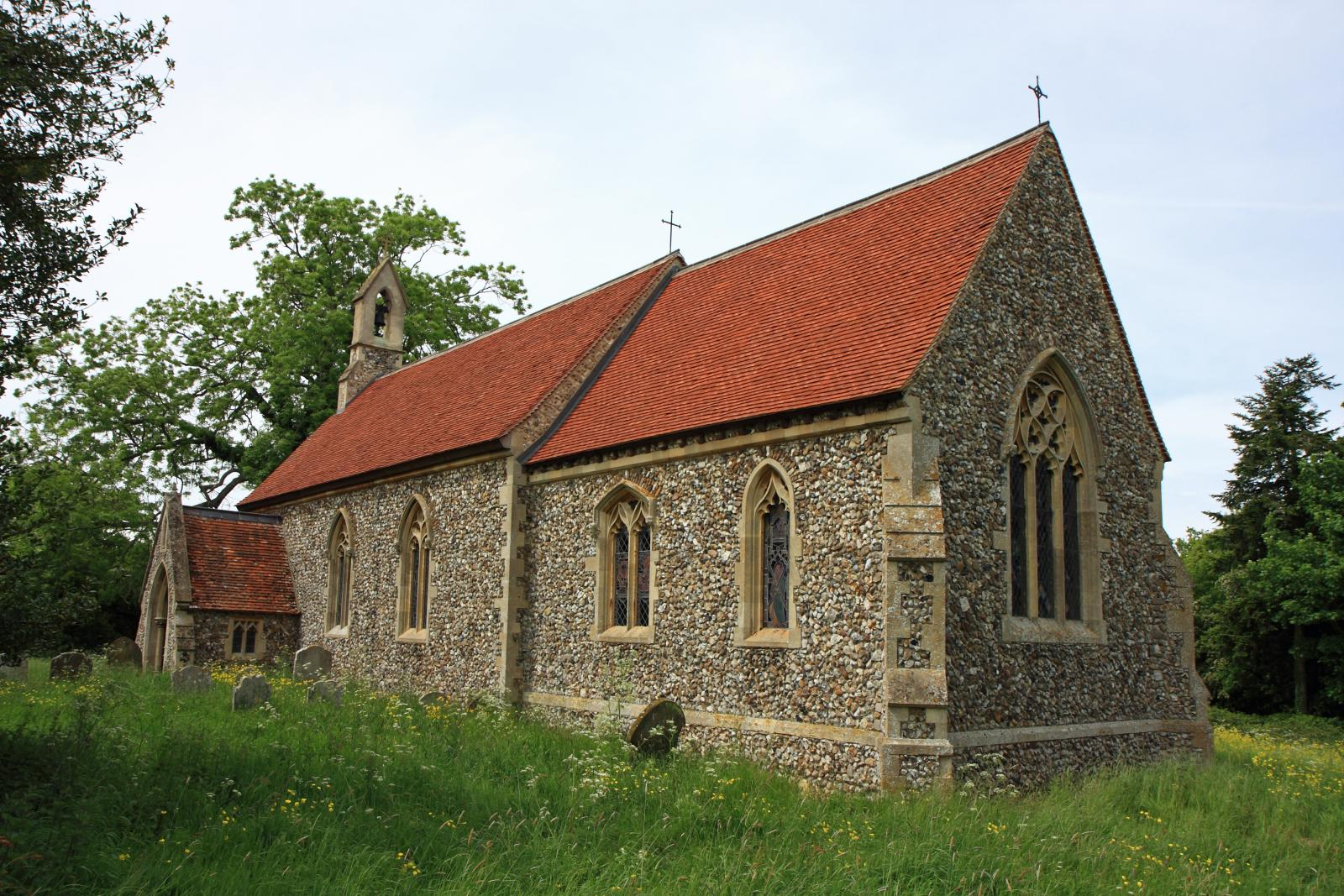
- St Andrew's church

- Location within Suffolk
- Area: 4 km^{2} (1.5 sq mi)
- Population: 80 (2005 est.)
  - Density: 20/km^{2} (52/sq mi)
- OS grid reference: TM442796
- District: East Suffolk
- Shire county: Suffolk
- Region: East
- Country: England
- Sovereign state: United Kingdom
- Post town: Beccles
- Postcode district: NR34
- Dialling code: 01502
- UK Parliament: Suffolk Coastal

Sotherton is a dispersed village and civil parish in the East Suffolk district, in the English county of Suffolk. It is located approximately 7 miles (11 km) south of Beccles and 3 3/4 miles (6.0 km) north-east of Halesworth. The A145 road passes through the east of the parish area. The mid-2005 population estimate for Sotherton parish was 80. (Note: At the 2011 United Kingdom census Sotherton was combined with the neighbouring parish of Blyford for statistical purposes. The Office for National Statistics does not report population figures for parishes where the population is small enough to potential identify individuals. The 2011 population of the two parishes combined was 193.) Uggeshall is located just to the north-east, Byford to the south and Blythburgh to the south-east. Latitude Festival takes place a couple of miles east.

== Domesday Book entry ==
HUNJRET OF BlIDINGA [BlYTHING] (At) SuDRETUNA [Sotherton] Rada a freeman held under Harold 2 carucates of land as a manor. now Franc holds it of Drogo. Then and after- wards 16 bordars, now 19. Then as now 2 serfs. Then and afterwards I plough on the demesne, now 2. Then as now 3 ploughs be- longing to the men. And 2 acres of meadow. Wood(land) for 100 swine. A church with 5 acres. And 1 rouncey. And now i beast. Then 12 swine, now 24, and 25 sheep. Then as now it was worth /^.os. It is i league long and half a league broad. And (pays) i\d. in geld. Rada, Drogo's predecessor, had soke and sac. To this manor Humphrey de Sancto Bertino added I freeman with 12 acres, over whom his predecessor had commendation T.R.E. Then as now 1 bordar. And half a plough. Worth 2s.

== 19th century gazetteer descriptions ==
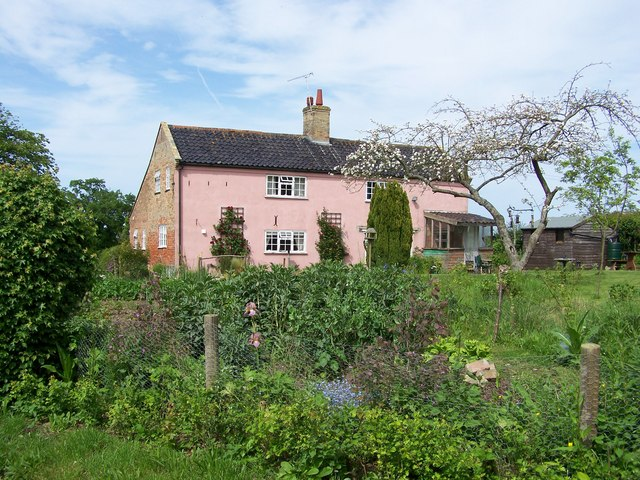
Church Cottage, Sotherton

In 1868 The National Gazetteer of Great Britain and Ireland:

"SOTHERTON, a parish in the hundred of Blything, county Suffolk, 4 miles N.E. of Halesworth, 7 S. of Beccles, and 2 N.W. of Wangford, its post town. The village, which is of small extent, is situated on the river Blyth, and is wholly agricultural. The living is a rectory annexed to that of Uggeshall, in the diocese of Norwich. The church is dedicated to St. Andrew."

In 1870–72, John Marius Wilson's Imperial Gazetteer of England and Wales:

"SOTHERTON, a parish in Blything district, Suffolk; 4 miles ENE of Halesworth r. station. Post town, Wangford. Acres, 1,085. Real property, £1,675. Pop., 187. Houses, 39. The property belongs to the Earl of Stradbroke. The living is a rectory, annexed to Uggeshall. The church was rebuilt in 1854."

And in 1894-5 The Comprehensive Gazetteer of England and Wales:

"Sotherton, a parish in Suffolk, 4 miles ENE of Halesworth station on the East Suffolk branch of the G.E.R. Post town and money order and telegraph office, Wangford (R.S.O.) Acreage, 1095; population, 159. The property belongs to the Earl of Stradbroke, who is lord of the manor. The living is a rectory, annexed to Uggeshall; joint gross value, £588 with residence, in the gift of the Earl of Stradbroke. The church, which was rebuilt in 1854, is a small building of flint in the Decorated style. "

== St Andrews Church ==
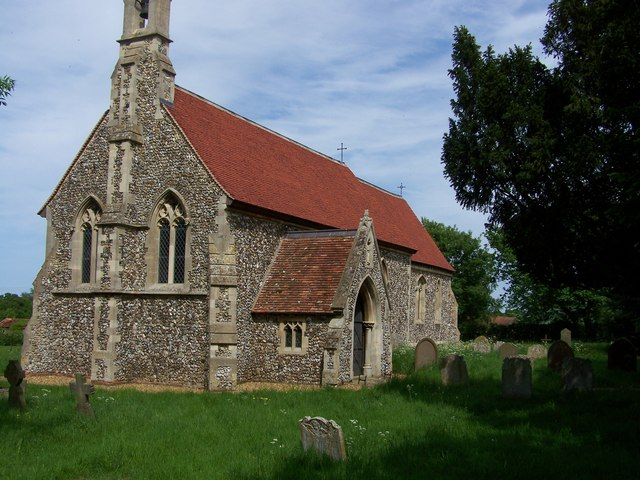
St Andrews Church, Sotherton

The parish church is dedicated to St Andrew and is located on a small dead-end lane signposted off the A145. It is a Grade II* listed building. It possesses a fine 1811 bust of John Rous, 1st Earl of Stradbroke by Nollekens, and a good late C13 effigy of a knight, of which the British Museum possesses 2 C19 prints.

== Global Village Trucking Company ==
In the 1970s Jeremy and James Lascelles, sons of the 7th Earl of Harewood, had a commune in Church Farm, with their band Global Village Trucking Company, roadies, etc. Jeremy Thorpe was a regular visitor. The writer Dinah Jefferies lived there, and has written about her experiences. In 1973 the BBC made a documentary film about the rock group living in a Suffolk commune with their families, friends, roadies and managers. They made a follow-up in 2003. Church Farm is now a holiday let.

== Sotherton Hall ==
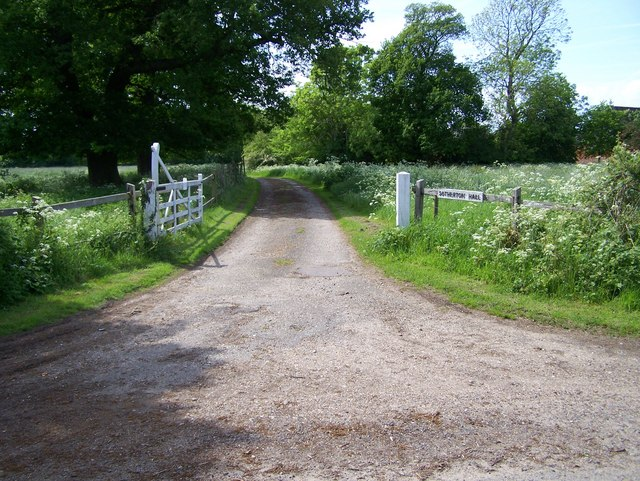
Sotherton Hall drive

Sotherton Hall is a grade II listed Tudor timber framed farmhouse or Hall house with a shaped brick gable end, set by a listed 17th/18th century timber framed and weatherboarded barn, in a small park towards the north of the parish mentioned by Nikolaus Pevsner. It belonged to the Earls of Stradbroke, as part of the Henham Park estate, until 1951 when it became part of the Blyford Estate of John Hill.
