= Uggeshall =

Village in Suffolk, England

Coordinates: 52.363°N 1.593°E

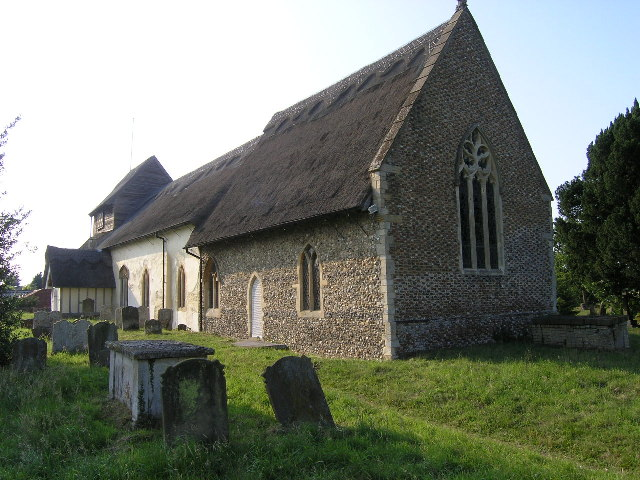
- Uggeshall, Church of St Mary

- Location within Suffolk
- Population: 170 (2005); 145 (2011)
- OS grid reference: TM456804
- District: East Suffolk
- Shire county: Suffolk
- Region: East
- Country: England
- Sovereign state: United Kingdom
- Post town: Beccles
- Postcode district: NR34
- Dialling code: 01502
- UK Parliament: Suffolk Coastal

Uggeshall is a village and civil parish in the East Suffolk district, in the county of Suffolk, England, located approximately 6 miles (10 km) south of Beccles and 4 miles (6 1/2km) north east of Halesworth close to the A145. The mid-2005 population estimate for Uggeshall parish was 170, reducing to 145 at the 2011 Census. Sotherton is located just to the south-west, Wangford to the south-east and Brampton and Stoven to the north.

The parish church is dedicated to St Mary and is one of only a handful with a thatched tower.
