= Woodbridge Rural District =

Former rural district in East Suffolk, England

Coordinates: 52.07°N 1.28°E

Woodbridge
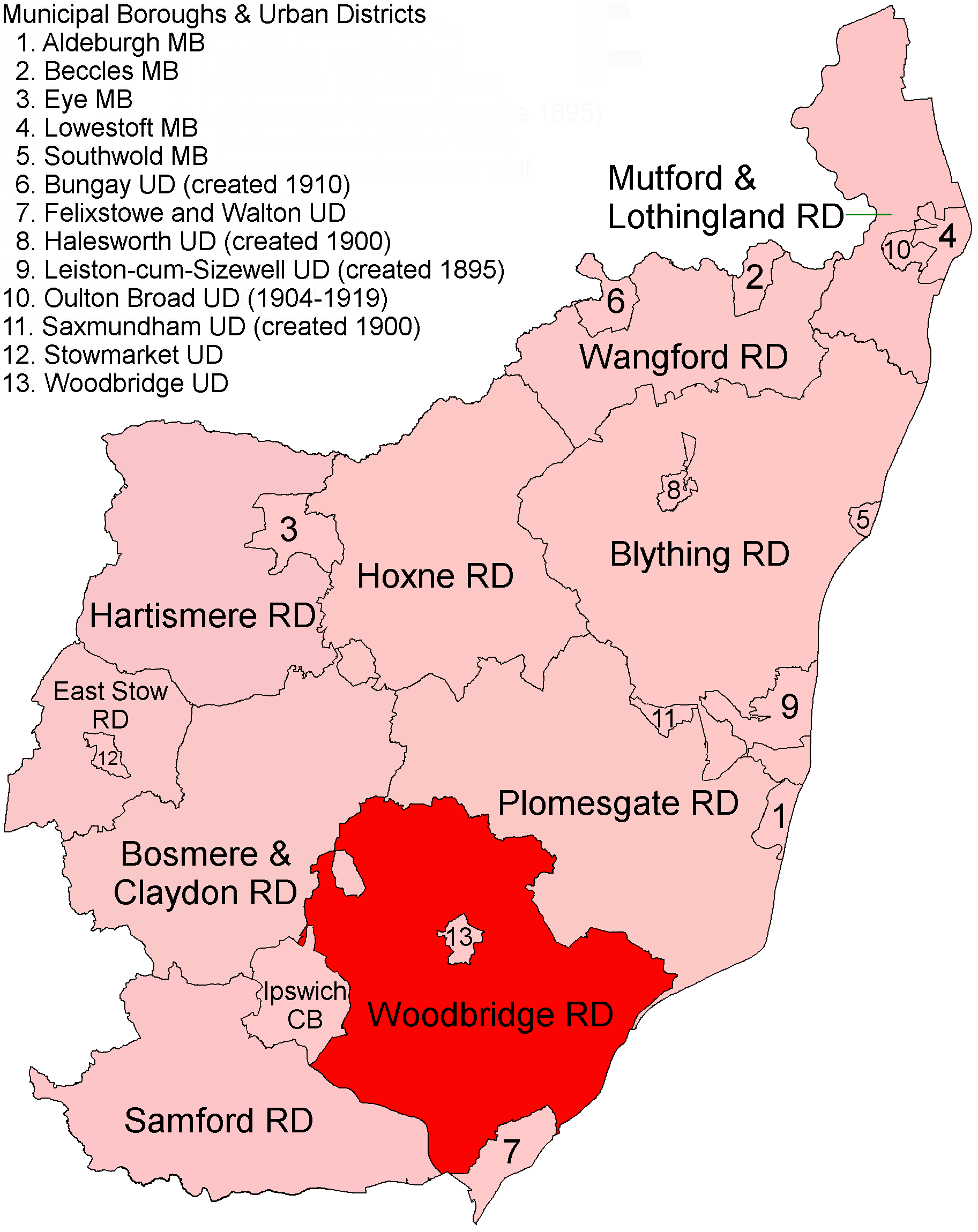
- Location within East Suffolk, 1894
- History
  - Created: 1894
  - Abolished: 1934
  - Succeeded by: Deben Rural District
- Status: Rural district

Woodbridge Rural District was a rural district within the administrative county of East Suffolk between 1894 and 1934. It was created out of the earlier Woodbridge rural sanitary district. It surrounded the town of Woodbridge, which had earlier been created as an urban district.

In 1934, under a County Review Order, Woodbridge Rural District was abolished and its parishes transferred to the new Deben Rural District.

== Statistics ==
Year	Area		Population	Density (pop/ha)
Year	acres	ha	Population	Density (pop/ha)
1911	73,327	29,675	16,314	0.55
1921	73,327	29,675	16,046	0.54
1931	73,327	29,675	18,386	0.62

== Parishes ==
Woodbridge RD contained the following parishes:

- Alderton
- Alnesbourn Priory
- Bawdsey
- Boulge
- Boyton
- Bredfield
- Brightwell
- Bromeswell
- Bucklesham
- Burgh
- Capel St Andrew
- Charsfield
- Clopton
- Culpho
- Dallinghoo
- Dallinghoo Wield
- Debach
- Falkenham
- Foxhall
- Great Bealings
- Grundisburgh
- Hasketon
- Hemley
- Hollesley
- Kesgrave
- Kirton
- Levington
- Little Bealings
- Martlesham
- Melton
- Nacton
- Newbourne
- Otley
- Pettistree
- Playford
- Purdis Farm
- Ramsholt
- Rushmere St Andrew
- Shottisham
- Stratton Hall
- Sutton
- Trimley St Martin
- Trimley St Mary
- Tuddenham St Martin
- Ufford
- Waldringfield
- Westerfield
- Witnesham
