= Thomas Seckford =

Member of the Parliament of England

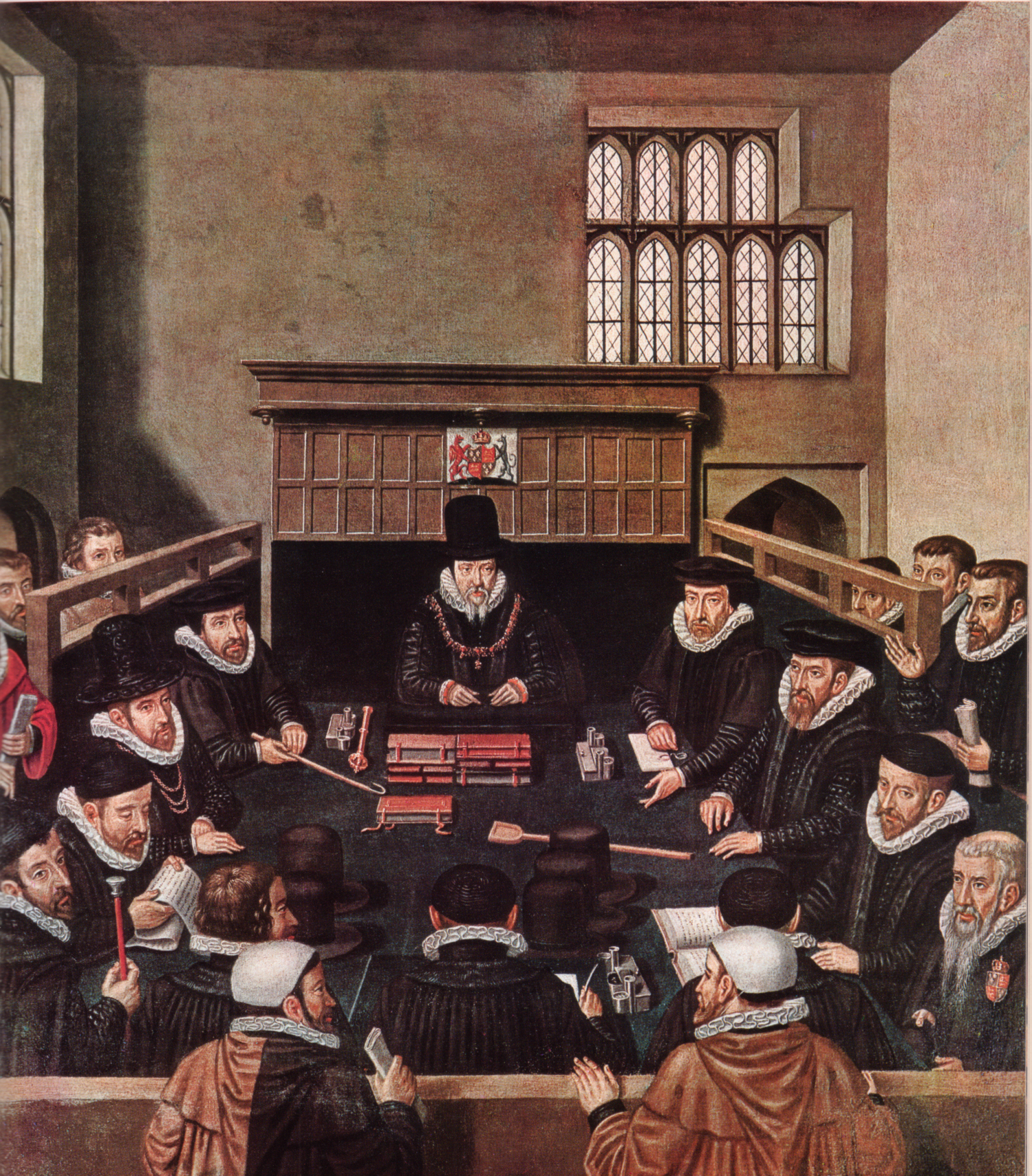
William Cecil presiding over the Court of Wards: the supposed Seckford figure is seated mid-left.

Thomas Seckford or Thomas Sakford Esquire (1515–1587) was a senior lawyer, a "man of business" at the court of Queen Elizabeth I, a landowner of the armigerous Suffolk gentry, Member of Parliament, and public benefactor of the town of Woodbridge. He was one of the Masters in Ordinary of the Court of Requests to Queen Elizabeth, 1569–1587, and was Surveyor of the Court of Wards and Liveries 1581–1587. He built mansions in Woodbridge, Ipswich and Clerkenwell, and was at different times Steward of the Liberty of Ely (St Etheldreda) in Suffolk, Bailiff for the Crown of the former possessions of Clerkenwell Priory in the City of London and County of Middlesex, and deputy Steward for the northern parts of the Duchy of Lancaster (to which he owed his early patronage). He was the patron of Christopher Saxton in the making of the first surveyed County Atlas of England and Wales.

The received portrait of Thomas Seckford, as it appears on Loder's 1796 token, as frontispiece to Loder's 1792 printing of Seckford's original Statutes for the Almshouses which he founded in Woodbridge, and in other recensions, was derived by the Woodbridge artist Isaac Johnson (c. 1754–1835) from a 16th-century painting depicting William Cecil presiding over the Court of Wards and Liveries. The figure identified as Seckford wears a tall patterned hat and sits at the table on the mid-left of the early painting. The possible identification as Seckford was made in the caption to an engraving by George Vertue after the original painting, published by the Society of Antiquaries of London in 1747 for the Vetusta Monumenta, noting that the figure is likely to be the Surveyor because he wears his tall hat in the presence of the Master.

He is not to be confused with his younger brother, Thomas Seckford of Ludlow, also a member of parliament, nor with his father, also Thomas Seckford (of Great Bealings), nor with his nephew Thomas Seckford, buried at Trinity College, Cambridge.

== Sekford of Great Bealings and Woodbridge ==
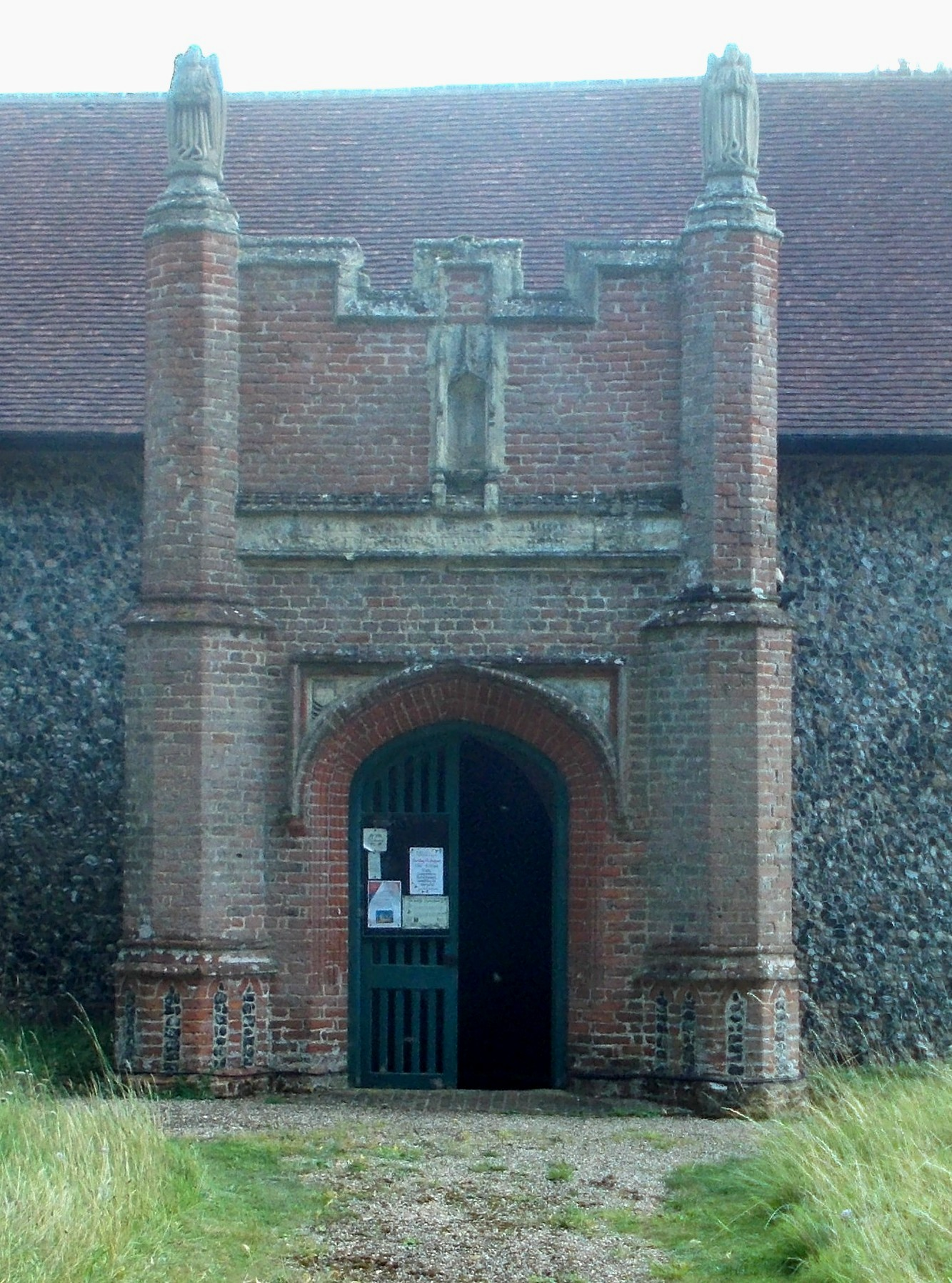
Porch of Great Bealings church, with carved inscription and angel turrets. The Seckford arms appear in the dexter spandrel of the arch

The Seckford family was associated with a place named Sekford in the parish of Great Bealings from early times. A Sekford Hall manor, the second manor, is listed in Domesday Book, and it was held in 1185 by Bartholomew de Sekford, son of William de Sekford, when it passed to Bartholomew's son John de Sekford. From this period the tenure of the Seckford Hall manor came down to the family of Thomas Seckford. The Seckford family had also been substantial landowners in Woodbridge since the time of Edward III at least, when (in 1335) a grant (of special grace) of free warren was made to John de Sekford and his heirs in his demesne lands in Great and Little Bealings, Martlesham, Woodbridge, Hasketon, Burgh and Boulge: John was also holding a manor of Clopton from John, Earl of Cornwall. Lands were released by Sir John de Sekford, Kt., in 1359.

At the time of his death in 1505, the benefactor's grandfather Thomas Seckford held Seckford Hall manor and the advowson of Little Bealings from Sir John Wingfield, Kt., and lands and estates in the parishes mentioned above, principally from Sir William Willoughby, Lord de Willoughby and from John Blenerhassett of Loudham, Suffolk (an historic estate in Pettistree). He and his wife Margaret (Purrye) were buried at Great Bealings, where a monument was recorded by John Weever. It was perhaps the grandfather Thomas who built the brick porch of Great Bealings church, as recorded by a carved inscription. By his will, his lands were to be held by his widow, making an allowance to his son Thomas (the benefactor's father), then aged nearly ten, until he should reach the age of 21. He also held manors in Norfolk which were to be administered for Thomas until that time. The Woodbridge manor and market were anciently granted to Woodbridge Priory, but at the time of the dissolution came into the hands of the Wingfield family.

== Early life ==
Thomas Seckford the benefactor was born near Woodbridge, Suffolk, England, the second son of Thomas Seckford of Great Bealings (c. 1495–1575) and his wife Margaret (c. 1482–1557), daughter of Sir John Wingfield (died 1509) of Letheringham, Suffolk and his wife Anne Tuchet, daughter of the 6th Baron Audley. His mother was a sister of Sir Anthony Wingfield's. His elder brother's name was Francis, and there were younger brothers John, Anthony, Humfrey, Henry and Thomas and sisters Mary and Elizabeth.

Thomas is believed to have been educated at the University of Cambridge (where he presumably studied law): if so, he was in the university at the time of the flourishing of reformed classical learning under the influence of Thomas Smith and John Cheke and their circle. In 1540 he entered Gray's Inn: his name in the register of admissions appears alongside that of Cheke's most eminent pupil William Cecil, the future Lord Burghley, with whom he worked at various times during his life. He was called to the bar in 1542, and Gray's Inn admitted him to the grand company of Ancients in 1547.

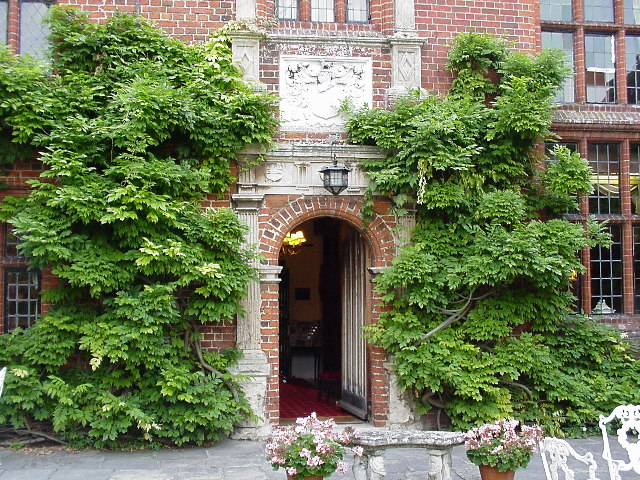
Seckford Hall, Great Bealings: main range entrance, south-western side (begun after 1553)

It has been presumed that Seckford's religious sympathies were with the reforming party. In 1539 Seckford's uncle Sir Anthony Wingfield, then newly admitted to the Privy Council of Henry VIII, had a lease of the former priory manor of Woodbridge from the Augmentions Office, and the reversion and rent of the manor was granted to his eldest son, John Wingfield of Hasketon and his wife Dorothy, in 1541. In 1542 John Wingfield demolished the priory church and added the land to the parish churchyard. However John Wingfield died without an heir, and the priory manor remained to his widow for term of her life, with reversion to the Crown.

Seckford's near relationship to Anthony Wingfield no doubt favoured him, and despite his uncle's death in 1552 that advantage persisted through Sir Anthony's son, Seckford's cousin Robert Wingfield, Captain of the Guard to Edward VI. In 1549 Robert Wingfield was active in persuading the king to remove Protector Somerset, and to place him under guard. Wingfield married Cecily, sister of Thomas Wentworth, 2nd Baron Wentworth (whom Queen Mary appointed Lord Deputy of Calais in 1553), and received knighthood from Mary.

At the start of Mary's reign, early in 1554, Seckford obtained a minor post in the Duchy of Lancaster, and this is taken to account for his entry into parliament for the duchy seat of Ripon in November 1554; similarly, the patronage of William Willoughby, 1st Baron Willoughby of Parham, is supposed to underlie Seckford's return to parliament as MP for Orford in 1555 and 1558. His distinction as a lawyer was thoroughly recognized by his appointment as Lent Reader at Gray's Inn in 1556.

Seckford's father began the building of the great brick mansion of Seckford Hall in Great Bealings after 1553, but, although it was so close to Woodbridge, and Queen Elizabeth is known later to have held court there, this never became the benefactor's personal residence. Nor did his mother live long to enjoy it, for Margaret Seckford (née Wingfield) died in 1557 aged 64.

== Elizabethan prosperity ==
At the onset of the reign of Elizabeth, Thomas Seckford received rapid advancement and various tokens of royal approval. In her Letters Patent of 1587 for Seckford's Almshouses in Woodbridge, Elizabeth wrote of "Our well beloved and faithful Thomas Seckford, Esquire, who hath faithfully served Us from the first Day of February, in the Third Year of Our Reign, for Our Counsel about Our Person and attendances about the same."

He and Dr. Walter Haddon were almost immediately appointed Elizabeth's two Masters in Ordinary of the Court of Requests, a role which Seckford held until his death. In January 1558/59 they are described as "learned in the Comon Lawes of this realme." These officers, assistants to the Lord Privy Seal (Sir Nicholas Bacon, 1558–1571) as chief Judge, dealt with poor men's causes brought by petition before Elizabeth as she journeyed around her realm. In accompanying her he maintained a position close to the monarch and gained a knowledge of the different parts of Britain. In a commission of October 1560 he is mentioned as a Doctor of both laws, having sat with Archbishop Matthew Parker, Sir Anthony Cooke and others in a Final Decree.

He was, simultaneously, Steward of the Court of the Marshalsea, deputy chief Steward for the Duchy of Lancaster (northern parts), in the commission of the peace for Suffolk and Middlesex (1558/59), and a commissioner for ecclesiastical causes in 1559. In 1561 he was a commissioner for the preparation of orders and regulations for the governance of the Fleet Prison.

=== Ipswich and Woodbridge ===
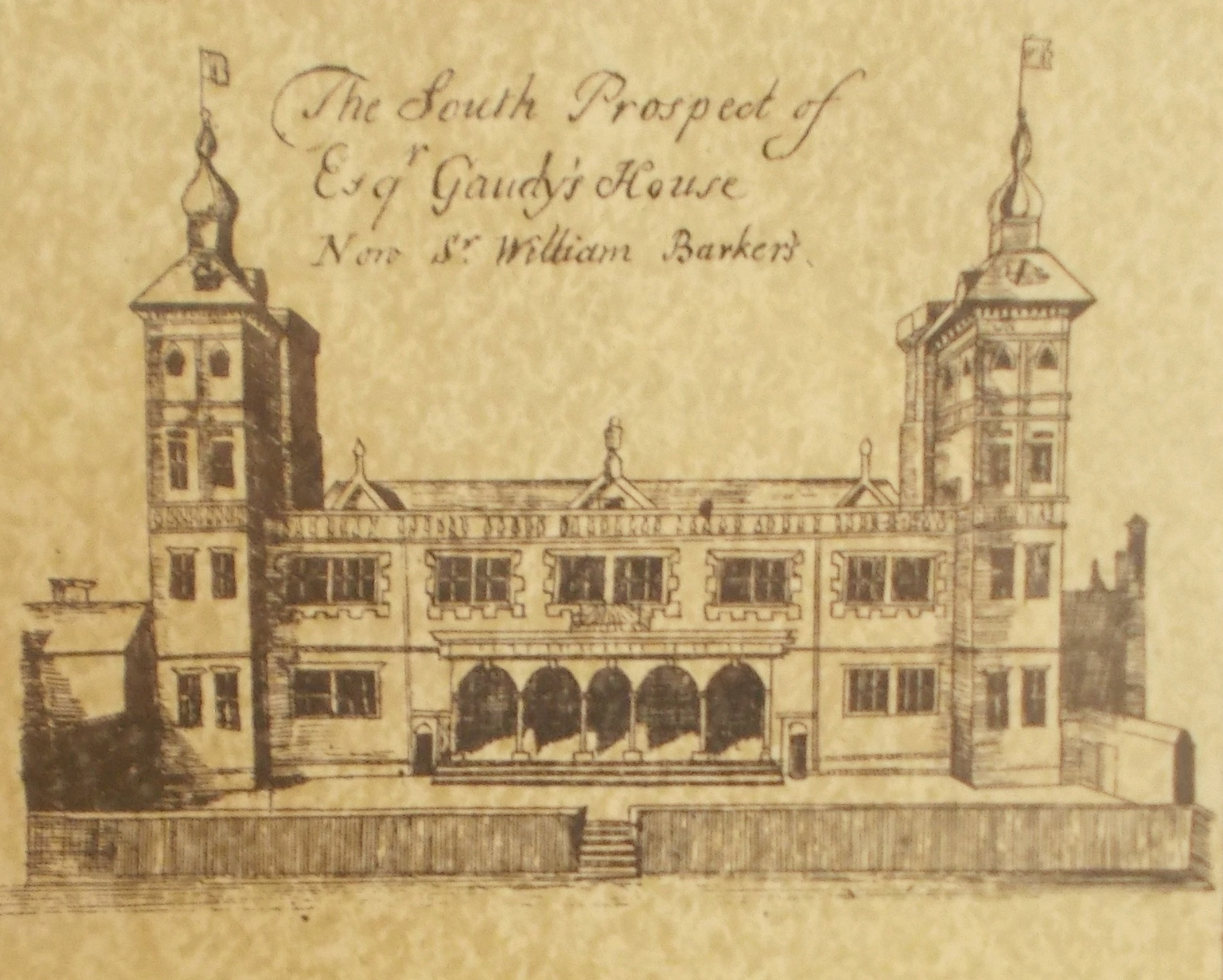
Thomas Seckford's mansion (the "Great Place") in Ipswich, south frontage, as shown in Ogilby's map of 1674.

Seckford was chosen with Robert Barker to represent Ipswich in parliament in 1559, and again with Edward Grimston in 1563. In the latter year he was appointed Steward of the Liberty of the Bishop of Ely (Liberty of St Etheldreda) in Suffolk.

In February 1562 he had permission to rebuild the sill of his mansion in Ipswich (which had a frontage onto Westgate Street where Museum Street now emerges) on condition that it did not impinge on the traffic in the highway. Although not so grand as Edmund Withypoll's Christchurch Mansion, Seckford's "Great Place" was one of the noble structures of Tudor Ipswich. The southern prospect, illustrated by John Ogilby for his Ichnographical Survey of Ipswich (by which time it belonged to Sir William Barker), shows a building of two principal storeys with five bays of Tudor fenestration, the first, third and fifth rising to gabled attic windows above, the whole flanked by a pair of four-storey towers with paired windows in each storey, and pyramidally-roofed with dormers above, crowned with onion-shaped pinnacles. The central three bays overshot a loggia in the ground floor of five round arches, from which a view south, across a formal garden and (beyond the river Orwell) towards Stoke, was afforded.

In May 1564 he purchased from the Crown the reversion of the manor and site of Woodbridge Priory (pending the death of Dorothy Wingfield), together with the capital mansion, all its dependent lands in Martlesham, Bealings, Hasketon, Grundisburgh, the Woodbridge water-mill and rectory, the manor and capital mansion of Haspely in Newbourne, the manor and chapel of Alnesbourne "or St Petronelle", the rectory of Brandeston, and all fairs, markets, tolls and customs, as they had been enjoyed by the priory. For all this he paid £764.8s.4d.

Seckford built or completed the brick mansion at the priory site, which became his private residence in the town. It was (and partly remains, though much renovated, reformed and embellished) a tall south-facing two-storey structure with gabled dormers above (four survive), with stucco-finished brick mouldings and mullions. Portions of former gabled cross-wings survive on the north side. The most striking survival is the three-storey brick porch (with a rooms in the upper storeys) with triple superimposed orders, its entrance archway in the Doric style with fluted pilasters, and its upper storeys with plain brick-formed pilasters. The Seckford coat of arms over the south porch is dated 1564, but the "capital mansion" at the priory (i.e. principal seat of the estate) itself may have been constructed before that.

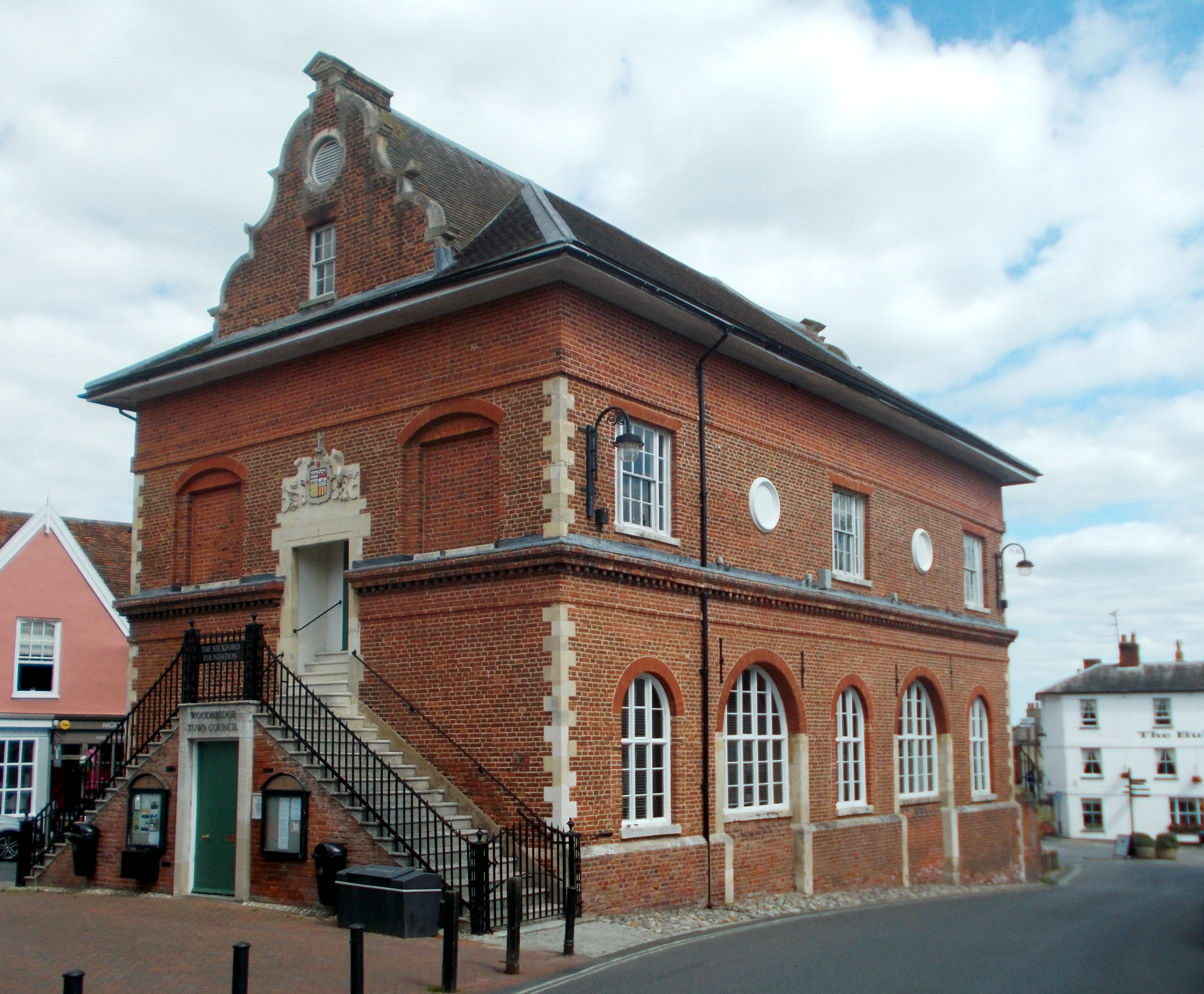
Woodbridge Shire Hall, built by Seckford as an open market with courtroom above, later modified

Seckford also built the nearby Woodbridge Shire Hall, or Sessions-Hall, when the quarter-sessions were removed from Melton, as a two-storey structure with open market below (the arches of which have since been infilled), and a room above which he gave to the County in perpetuity. Seckford's arms are displayed in stonework over the first floor west entrance. He became Treasurer of Gray's Inn in 1565.

=== Marriage ===
On 5 February 1566/67 Seckford married Elizabeth, daughter of Thomas Harlowe, at St Mary Woolnoth in the City of London. Elizabeth had moved in the higher circles of London civic society, and was already twice widowed. Her first husband, William Billingsley (died 1553), was a prominent citizen and Haberdasher and Assay-master of the Tower of London and Southwark mints, by whom she was the mother of Henry Billingsley, a future Lord Mayor of London. Her second husband was Sir Martin Bowes (died 1566), one of the great Lords Mayors in the last years of Henry VIII, destroyer of the monuments in the London Greyfriars, and a notable survivor during the reign of Queen Mary. Seckford remembered in his will his "loving friend and late son-in-law, William Bowes" – "late", i.e. former, (stepson) because William's mother had died in the previous year, 1586.

== Later career ==
=== Clerkenwell ===
In 1566 Seckford purchased an estate of land in Clerkenwell, Middlesex, consisting of the greater part of a field called St Mary's Close, which had belonged to the Benedictine Nunnery of St Mary at Clerkenwell. The nunnery church of St Mary (a modified 12th-century structure) was rededicated as St James's parish church at the Reformation. Seckford's land was in the area laid out in the 19th century as Sekforde Street and Woodbridge Street, and on this land Seckford built a large house called Woodbridge House, and another which became his own private residence. The latter was near to the residence of his younger brother Sir Henry Sekford, a Groom of the Privy Chamber, who was married to a daughter of Sir Henry Bedingfeld's. Other lands in the same immediate neighbourhood had been part of the estate of Clerkenwell Priory, or Hospital of St John of Jerusalem, and in 1573 Queen Elizabeth conveyed three acres, called Bocher or Butt Close, on the west side of the former priory, to Seckford.

In the interim between these two acquisitions he had served in several important commissions and parliamentary committees, beginning with an oyer and terminer for Surrey in which Edmund and Arthur Pole were tried for high treason. In 1556 he deliberated on the trial of offences committed within the verge of the Queen's household, and in 1570 his commission of oyer and terminer for London encompassed the trial and condemnation of John Felton for his treasonable actions. In 1571 Thomas Wilson replaced Haddon as Seckford's fellow Master of Requests, and Seckford was junior Knight of the Shire (MP) for Suffolk, with Sir Owen Hopton: in the following year he was chosen again for Ipswich with Edward Grimston. In 1575 he was appointed "Bailiff, collector and receiver of rents of all manors, messuages and lands which had belonged to the Priory or Hospital of St John of Jerusalem but now in the possession of the Crown in the City of London and the County of Middlesex," and it is suggested that this position may have facilitated the improvement of his Clerkenwell estate.

Seckford's personal integrity became considered as a byword. A short poem of Latin verse was made for Seckford as a compliment by "M. Doctor Norton" (?Thomas Norton), concerning the mutability of all things except virtue, the first letter of each line forming an acrostic on Seckford's name. One English version was written by Edmund Withypoll of Ipswich, and another by Gabriel Harvey.

=== Saxton's patron ===
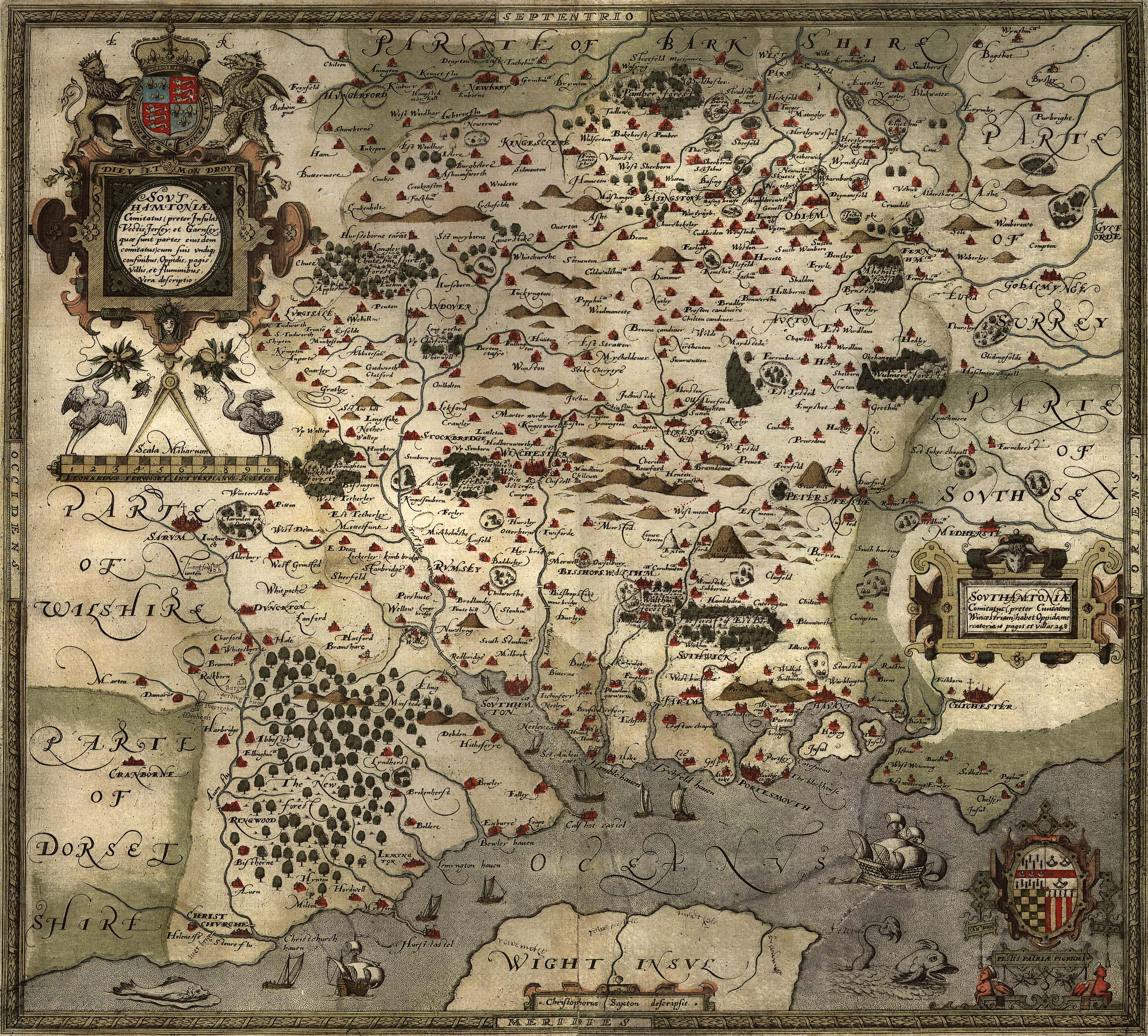
Saxton's Map of Hampshire, c. 1575: Seckford's arms in the lower right corner.

It was by the encouragement and considerable expense of Thomas Seckford that the first County Maps of England produced from an actual Survey were undertaken by Christopher Saxton, during the 1570s. The engraved plates of the completed atlas (dedicated to the Queen), each of which bears the royal arms and those of Thomas Seckford as patron, range in date from 1574 to 1579. By her patent of 1577, Elizabeth granted to Saxton the sole rights to produce maps and atlases for ten years, and introduced the project in this way:

"Whereas Christopher Saxton, servaunt to our trustie and wel beloved Thomas Sekeford esquier, master of requestes unto us, hath already (at the greate coste, expenses and charges of his said master) traveyled throughe the greateste parte of this oure realme of England, and hathe to the greate pleasure and comoditie of us, and our lovinge subjectes, uppon the perfecte viewe of a greate nomber of the severall counties, and sheires of oure said realme, drawen oute, and sett forthe, diverse trew and pleasaunt mappes, chartes or platts of the same counties, together with the citties, townes, villages, and ryvers therein conteyned, vearie diligentlie and exactlie donne; and entendithe, yf God graunte hym lief, further to travell therein, throughout all the residue of oure said realme, and so from tyme to tyme to cause the same platts, and discriptions, to be well and fayre ingraven..."

Saxton obtained the services of various engravers, including the Dutch artist Remigius Hogenberg and the Englishman Augustine Ryther (died 1593), so that the work became not only a vast source of information, but also a celebration of English cartography and engraving. Cornelis de Hooghe, who was sometimes based in Ipswich, engraved the first plate of Norfolk in 1574. Seckford was the dedicatee of William Harrison's Description of Scotland published as a part of his Description of Britain, to accompany Raphael Holinshed's Chronicles: Harrison (1534–1593) thanked him for his "singular curtesie" and help with the description of the rivers and streams of Britain, observing that Seckford's good nature "greatly favoureth any thing that is doone for a commoditie unto many," and called down blessings upon him and upon "my good Lady your Wife".

=== Wards and Liveries ===
When Margaret Stanley, Countess of Derby became a possible heir to the throne (following the death of Lady Mary Grey in 1578), in 1579 she was arrested under suspicion of having imagined the Queen's death by sorcery, and was detained under house confinement. In a letter of 1580 to Sir Christopher Hatton the Countess mentioned her hopes to move to Clerkenwell: "My cousin Sackford hath built him a house at Clerkenwell, which is not yet thoroughly finished. I would be very gladly his tenant; for the air, as I take it, cannot be much unlike to that of his house at St. John's: but I hear now that they die of the sickness round about it...". In writing a little later to Queen Elizabeth she observed, "But, most dear Sovereign, I confess and acknowledge that I have found great mercy and goodness at your hands, in that, of your merciful consideration you sent me to the house of your Majesty's grave officer the Master of Requests, my very good friend and kinsman...", before being sent on to Isleworth House. The Countess's kinship to Seckford lay through the Wingfield side. She is mentioned in Thomas Seckford's will, and in the final section of her own will of 1596 made arrangements concerning a house which she had leased from Seckford at Clerkenwell.

In 1579 or 1581 Seckford was appointed Surveyor of the Court of Wards and Liveries, and served under William Cecil (Master of that Court) until his death at Clerkenwell in 1587. As Master of Requests, Seckford is named in 1581 in company with Valentine Dale and David Lewis, and records his title on the Bealings memorial of 1583.

=== Seckford memorial 1583 ===
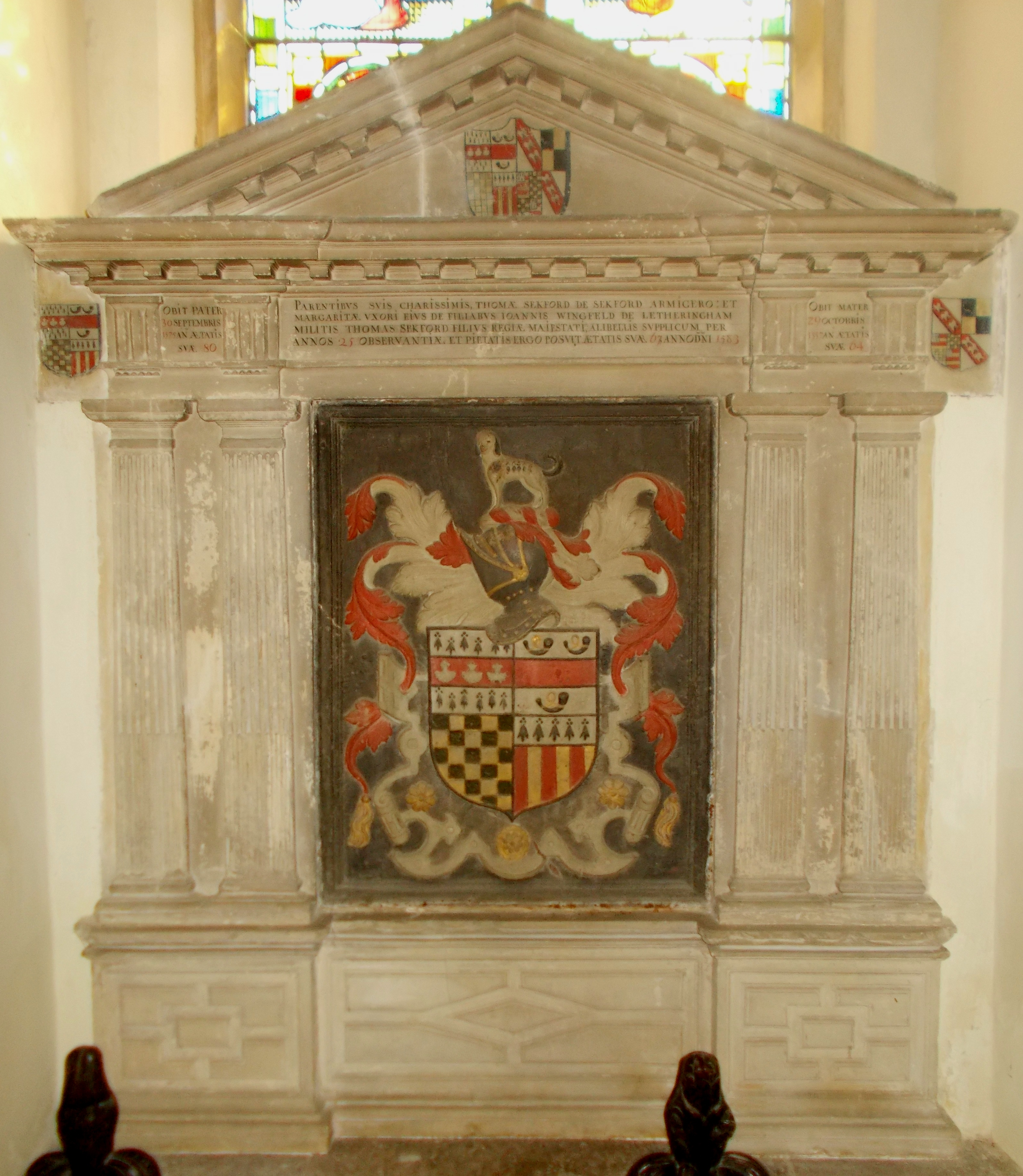
Thomas Seckford's memorial for his parents, 1583

Thomas Seckford senior of Seckford Hall, father of the benefactor, died in 1575 aged 80, and was buried in the parish church of Great Bealings. Seckford's mother, Margaret (Wingfield), had died in 1557 at the age of 64. In 1583 Thomas Seckford, then aged 67, dedicated a memorial to them in that church, with a handsome display of heraldry, to embrace them in the celebration of his own 25 years of service as Master of Requests. It is a composite wall plaque with twin fluted pilasters in flat relief at either side in pale limestone, rising from a register ornamented with panelling beneath, centrally recessed, and with an entablature above bearing inscriptions, surmounted by a projecting pediment with richly dentillated cornices.

At the centre of this composition is a large rectangular carved and painted panel displaying an escutcheon of the arms of Thomas Seckford in their usual quartering, in a strapwork compartment enclosing three rosettes or, the helm above crested with the talbot ermine, among foliate mantling. The quarterings used by Seckford are those allowed in the 1577 Visitation of Suffolk by Cooke Clarenceux, as follows:

- Seckford: Ermine on a fess gules three escallops or (but here the escallops are argent);
- Hunter: Argent a fess gules between three hunting horns sable adorned or;
- Hackford: Chequy or and vert;
- Jenny of Knodishall: Paly of six or and gules a chief ermine.

Small painted escutcheons of arms appear dexter (father) and sinister (mother) of the entablature, beside short inscriptions stating their ages and dates of death, and the impalement of the two (representing the marriage) is painted into the tympanum of the pediment.

The inscription reads:

"Parentibus suis charissimis, Thomae Sekford de Sekford armigero: et Margaritae uxori eius de filiabus Ioannis Wingfeld de Letheringham militis Thomas Sekford filius Regiae Maiestati, a libellis Supplicum per annos 25 observantiae et pietatis ergo posuit aetatis suae 67, Ano Dni 1583."
To his beloved parents, Thomas Sekford of Sekford Esquire, and Margaret his wife, one of the daughters of Sir John Wingfield of Letheringham, Kt., their son Thomas Sekford, [being] Master of Requests to the Queen's Majesty through 25 years of service and devotion on that account placed [this memorial] in the 67th year of his age, in the year of Our Lord 1583.

== Seckford's Alms-House ==
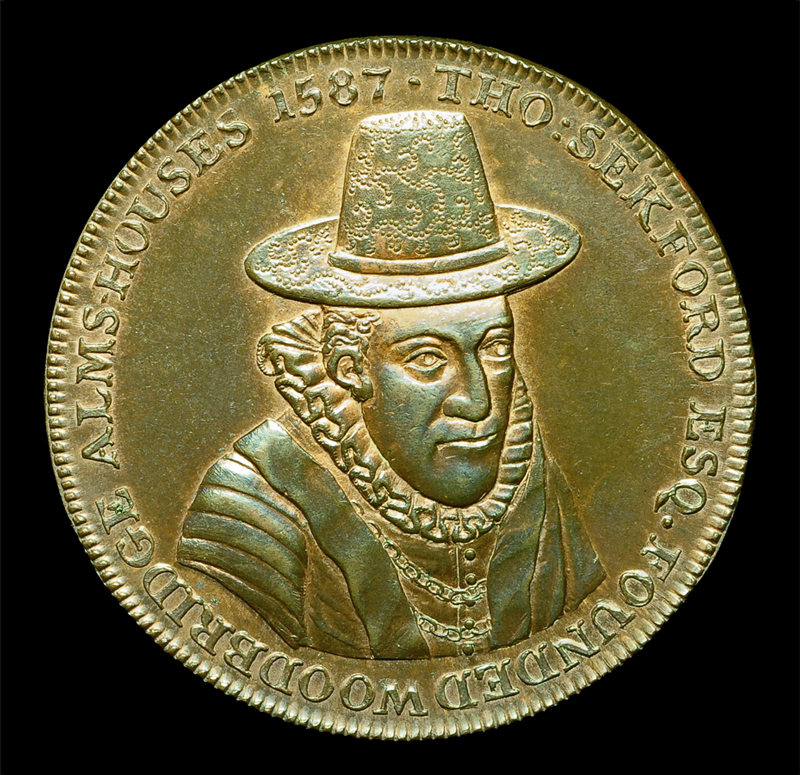
1796 Conder Token, Obverse

In his last year, Thomas Seckford founded seven almshouses in Woodbridge in 1587, endowed with an income of £112.13s.4d. (£112.66p) per annum from his property in Clerkenwell, Middlesex. The Letters Patent licensing their foundation (as "Seckford's Alms-house") were issued on 23 May 1587 (Elizabeth's 29th year). Seckford wrote his ordinances for the almshouses (then "newly-erected") on 10 July 1587, and the necessary directions and bequests of land to the Governors were expressed in his will dated 1 August 1587. The Governors were incorporated by Patent, to be the Chief Justice of the Court of Bench, and the Lord of the manor of Seckford Hall, if he be an heir-male of Seckford's father: or, in default of such heir-male, then the Master of the Rolls. These, with advice of the minister and churchwardens of Woodbridge parish church, were to select the candidates.

A finely-illuminated folio of Ordinances and statutes made by me, Thomas Sekford esq; the 10th of July, 1587, for the election, admission, exercises, expulsion, and government of 13 poor persons placed in my new-erected alms-houses in Woodbred, in the county of Suffolk appeared in a library sale of 1763. The text of the vellum manuscript, which came into the possession of the Master of the Rolls, was published in 1792 together with extensive historical notices and a view of the original almshouses.

Built in a single terrace, the almshouses consisted of six houses with attics over, each to be occupied by two poor or infirm unmarried men or widowers, and a seventh similar for the Principal almsman to occupy alone (13 in all). Anyone found to have a wife was to be summarily expelled. Each house had its own garden which the occupants were to work for produce, and there was additional land for working, and a fount for water with a yard for washing. The men received a pension paid quarterly, and were provided with cloth for new robes annually, and a silver badge displaying the Seckford arms, so that they were identifiable as they went about the town. They were, of course, to attend services and sermons regularly at St Mary's church. Tippling and playing at cards or gaming were forbidden, as was swearing or cursing at one another, and all kinds of lewdness and fornication, which were punishable first by fines deducted from the pensions, and ultimately by expulsion. Three poor widows received a pension and lodgings nearby to attend to and care for the men when they were sick or infirm.

== Death and legacy ==
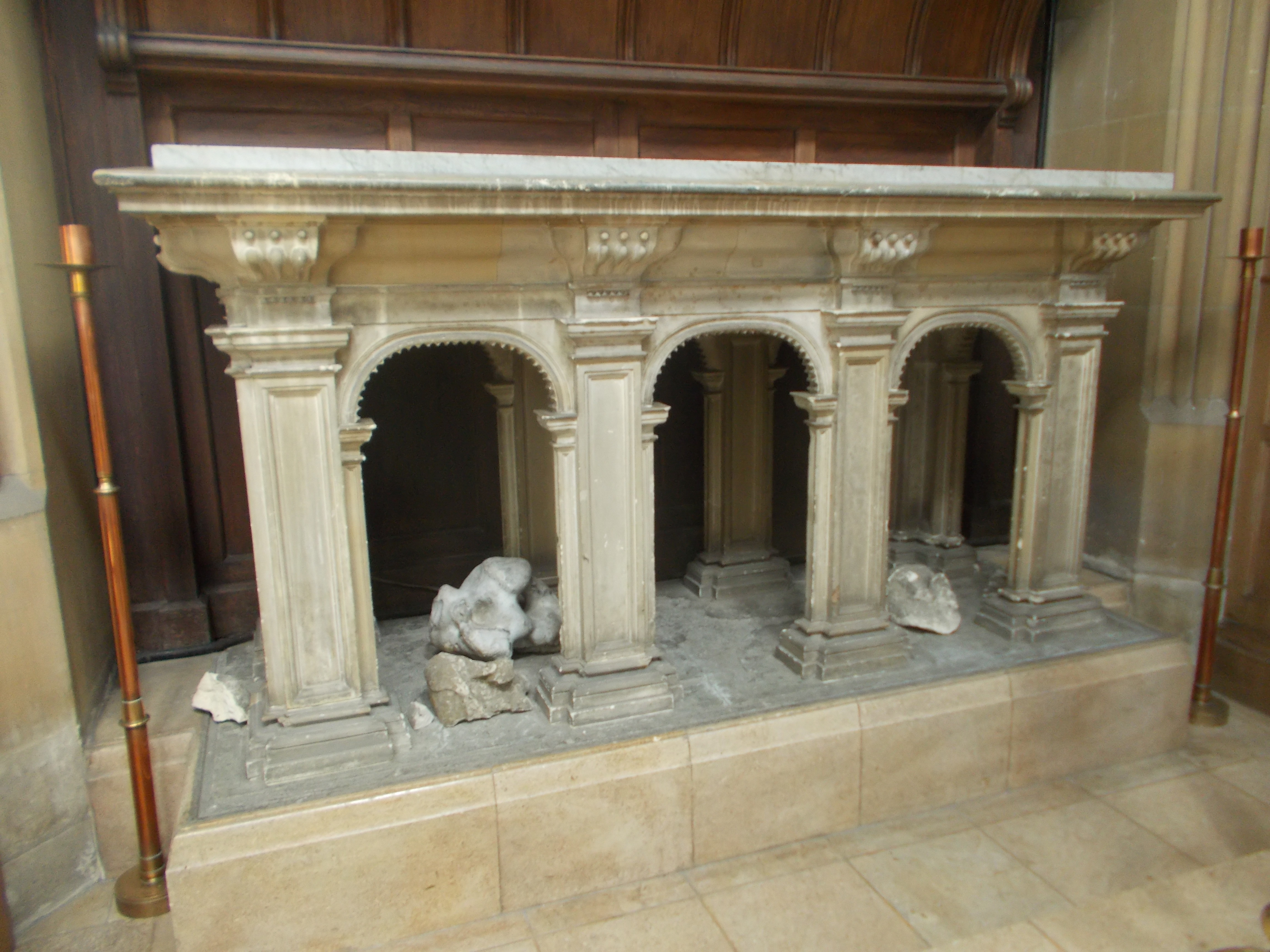
Seckford's monument at Woodbridge church

Seckford's wife Elizabeth died at Clerkenwell in November 1586, and was buried in the vault of her second husband Sir Martin Bowes at St Mary Woolnoth church. Thomas died at Clerkenwell 19 December 1587, aged 72, and was first buried there: but in accordance with his will his body was afterwards transferred to a vault in a chapel at the north-east side of St. Mary's Church in Woodbridge. That chapel is now an organ-chamber: it was the vault, not the chapel itself, which had been constructed by Seckford. His coat of arms, as a quartering with helm and crest within a strapwork oval, appears in original glass in the west window of the north aisle.

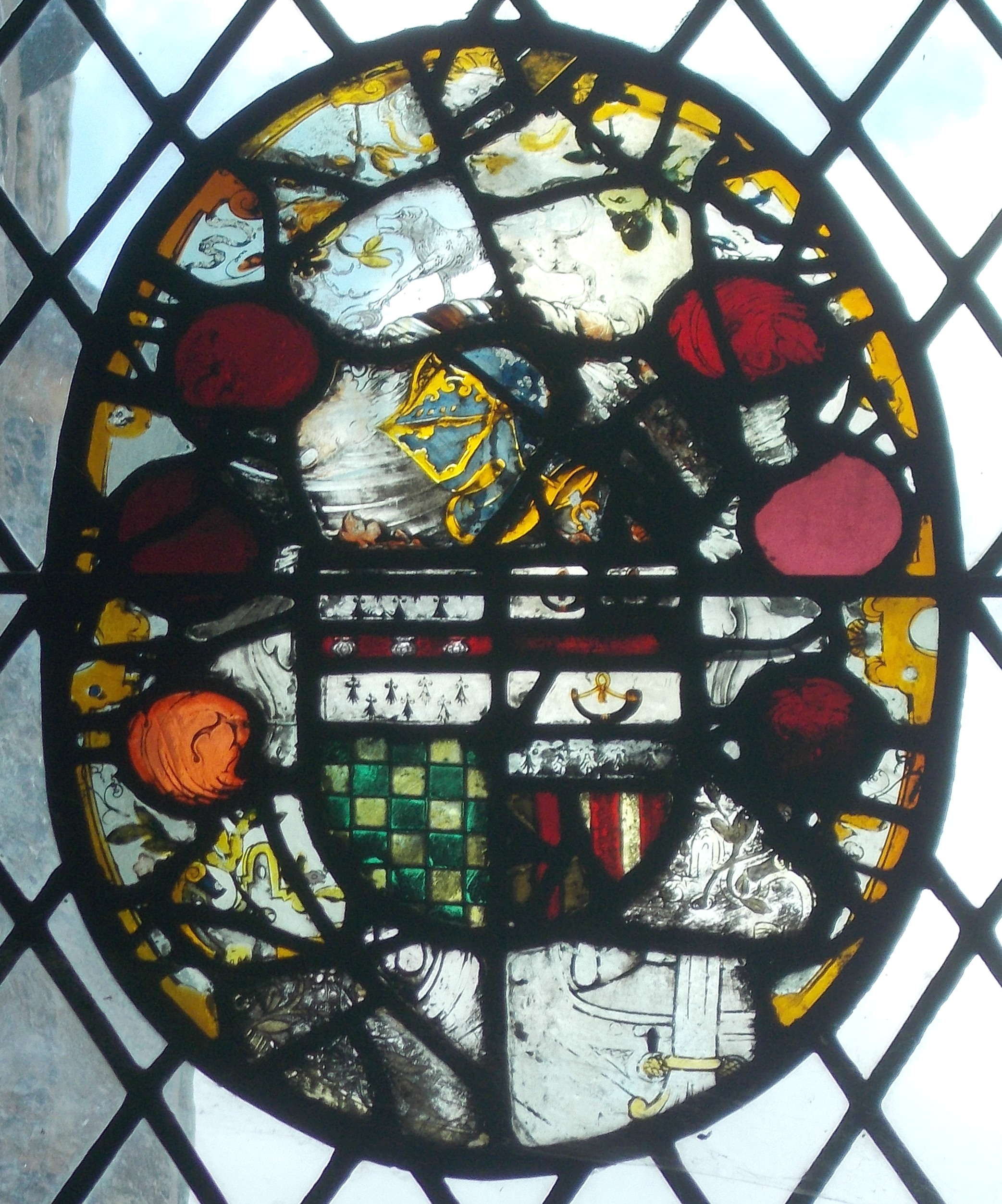
Seckford's arms in glass at Woodbridge church

The vault was surmounted by a rectangular monument like a table-tomb: from the basal slab (the re-used matrix of an elaborate brass) eight squared and panelled columns arise between three arched openings on either side of the chest, with one arch at each end, leaving the interior space entirely open. Above the columns large consoles project outwards to support the table slab, which overhangs the lower structure. This monument, restored, is now positioned in the most easterly arcade between the chancel and the north-east chapel.

Since Thomas Seckford had no children, at his inquisition post mortem held in 30 Elizabeth (1588) it was found that his nephew Charles Seckford MP (son of Francis Seckford of Seckford Hall, then deceased), was his heir. His will was proved on 3 January 1588, but became the subject of a dispute between Charles and Henry Seckford (a younger brother of Thomas's), leading to a Sentence in Charles's favour in 1590. Charles died in 1592, and disputes in the Seckford family over the control of the estate continued for many years afterwards.

The informatively heraldic tomb of Thomas Seckford in the chapel of Trinity College, Cambridge, restored, is that of a nephew.

=== The Seckford Foundation ===
Seckford Foundation Almshouses today

Site of the original houses, and the old Seckford Arms, now closed.

Seckford's beneficence is still felt in Woodbridge and Suffolk today. His endowments are managed by Trustees as The Seckford Foundation. The existing almshouses (sometimes called the Seckford Hospital) were built on an adjacent site in 1838–42: they have been very substantially refurbished in modern times and are administered as the Seckford Foundation Almshouses by a sector of the Trust named Seckford Care. The smaller terrace of almshouses near to the entrance of the site stand on the actual site of the original houses.

The almshouse trust was extended in 1861 to include support for the Woodbridge School, which, with the Abbey Junior School, is now maintained by the Foundation, and in 2007 the Seckford Theatre was established in Woodbridge under the same auspices.

In 2012 the Seckford Education Trust ("SET") was set up by the Foundation: it has opened Secondary Schools at Beccles, Ixworth and Saxmundham, and in 2019 adopted two Primary Schools, the Maidstone Infants School and Causton Junior School, both in Felixstowe. The Foundation also makes individual grants and other benefactions, with a particular focus on education and support for the young, and on care, shelter and support for the elderly.

== Commemoration and popular culture ==
=== Robert Loder's token ===
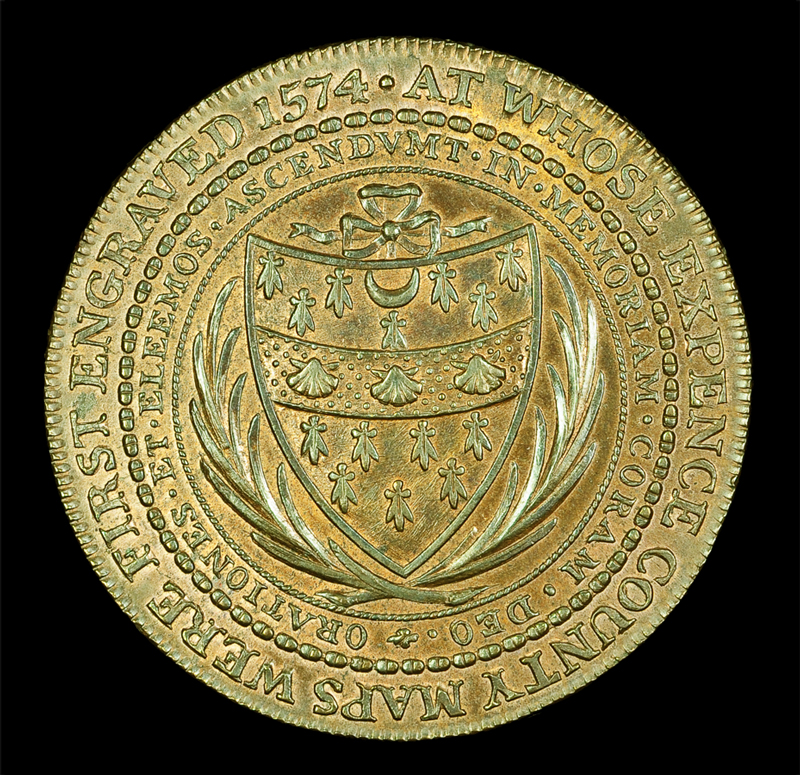
1796 Conder Token, Reverse

In 1796, at a time when English copper coinage was in poor condition and was augmented by many tradesmen's tokens, a one-penny-sized copper Conder token or medalet was issued by R. Loder of Woodbridge, commemorating Thomas Seckford. The obverse showed a bust of Seckford in his hat with the legend "THO SEKFORD ESQ. FOUNDED WOODBRIDGE ALMSHOUSES 1587."

The reverse showed an escutcheon of Seckford's single arms (ermine on a fess gules 3 escallops argent) with the legend "AT WHOSE EXPENCE COUNTY MAPS WERE FIRST ENGRAVED 1574."; within this, in Latin, was "ORATIONES . ET . ELEEMOS . ASCENDUMT . IN . MEMORIAM . CORAM . DEO." (Prayers and alms rise before God in his memory). This was probably intended to resemble the old badge of the almsmen.

=== Streets and inns ===
The almshouses occupy a site in Seckford Street, Woodbridge (running between Market Hill and Drybridge Hill), and an inn named The Seckford Arms (now a private house) stood beside the gateway entrance to the site.

Sekforde Street in Clerkenwell, London, is built on land once owned by Thomas Seckford and is named for him. Sekforde Street adjoins Woodbridge Street, laid out at the same time in the 1830s. The Sekforde public house at the corner of Sekforde Street in Clerkenwell has a modified version of the be-hatted portrait for its inn-sign.

In the film About a Boy starring Hugh Grant the main character, Will, lives in a flat in No.1 Sekforde Street (actual research shows the temporary movie-set doorway was constructed at 16–18 St James's Walk, the same glazed-brick building but around the corner.) Woodbridge Chapel on Woodbridge Street also features in the film as the scene of the "Single Parents Alone Together" (SPAT) meeting.
