= Bealings =

Bealings may refer to:

- Bealings railway station
- Great Bealings, Suffolk
- Little Bealings, Suffolk
