= A Game of Tric-Trac =

1630 painting by Judith Leyster

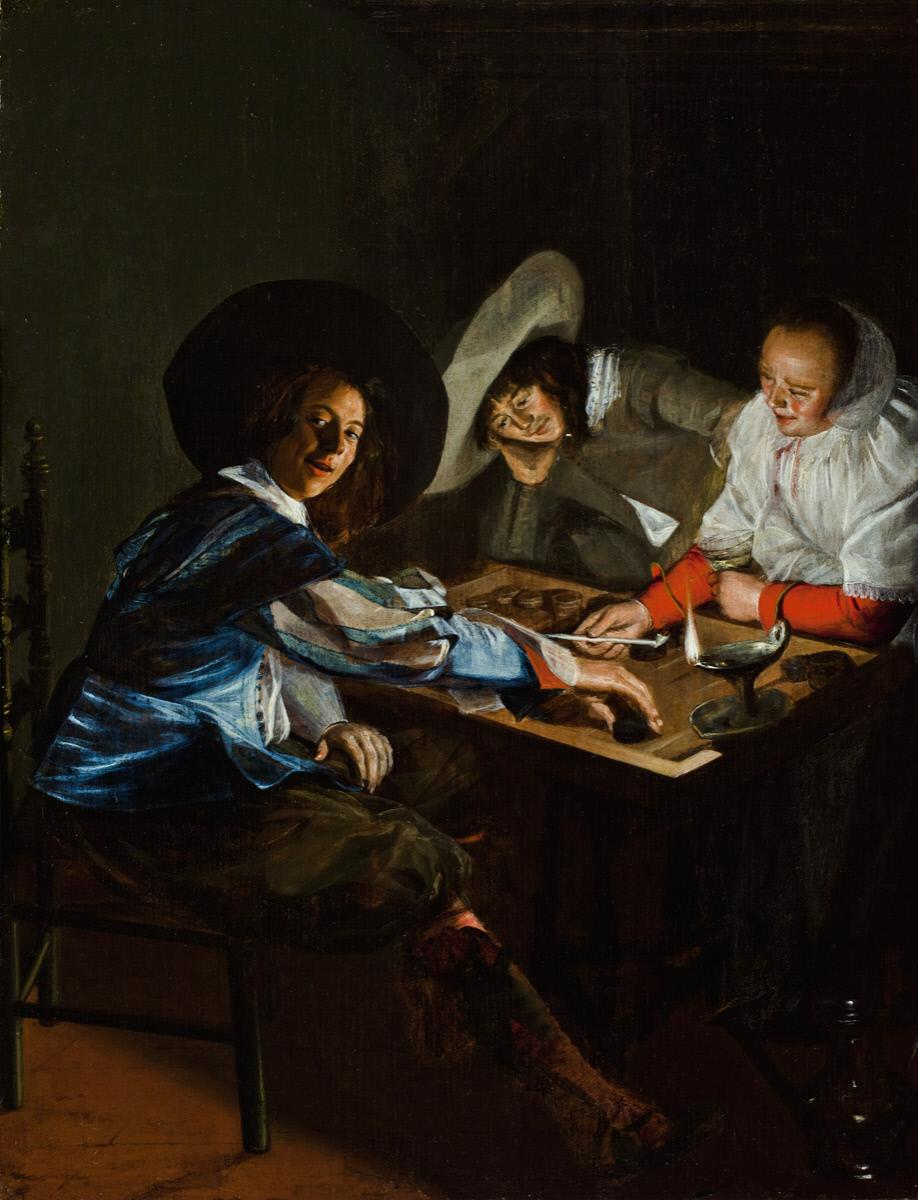
- Artist: Judith Leyster
- Year: 1630
- Type: Oil paint on panel
- Dimensions: 41 by 31 centimetres (16 in × 12 in)
- Location: Worcester Art Museum, Worcester, Massachusetts

A Game of Tric-Trac is a painting by Judith Leyster from 1630.

== Provenance ==
Little has been written about Leyster or about A Game of Tric-Trac — outside of scholarship by Frima Fox Hofrichter — as there is a large gap in written documentation between her death in 1660 and 1893, when Cornelis Hofstede de Groot found business records regarding the sale of Leyster painting Carousing Couple, sparking a new interest in the Dutch artist. A Game of Tric-Trac was misattributed to Pieter de Hooch until the early 20th century. Still, it can be confidently attributed to Leyster based on comparative analysis of artistic and stylistic components similar to those in her painting, Proposition, a signed and dated work done by Leyster.

== Paint and Underdrawing ==
A Game of Tric-Trac is one of two paintings by Leyster that show evidence of the traditional seventeenth-century method of priming wood panels for oil painting. Microscopic examination of the painting reveals a bold and extensive underdrawing, which subsequently reveals Leyster's spontaneous course of action as she made readjustments to the composition directly on the primed wooden surface. Scientific processes further support the notion that Leyster spontaneously adjusted her composition, as x-ray and infrared studies reveal adjustments to both the sleeves of the woman and the foot of the man in the foreground. Additional examination also reveals insightful information about the types of pigments and materials Leyster used in her paintings. Leyster used a combination of dark blue indigo and lead white over a brown underpaint to construct the blue portions of the costume worn by the man closest to the viewer. Other pigments found in the composition include “layers which contain fine bone black, lead, and ocher” in the background, as well as traces of organic red pigments visible in the flesh tones of the woman.

== Description ==
A Game of Tric-Trac offers an insight into seventeenth-century Dutch nightlife as well as the codes surrounding prostitution and morality. Backgammon, which was usually called tric-trac, was a popular pastime during Leyster's lifetime, depicted in paintings by many of her contemporaries. Despite the popularity of the seventeenth-century game, there was a consensus of its association with drunkenness and lustfulness, so A Game of Tric-Trac would have been understood as indulging in the perceived immoral act in seventeenth-century Dutch society. While there is often a woman present in these pieces, besides one print by Jacob Matham, none of them depict her as having an active role in the game. Leyster's painting is interesting then because the woman in it appears to be the opposing player. Leyster signals this to the viewer with her placement of the oil lamp, which would have been placed on one side of the board (the "inner table") between the two players. The man in the center of the composition is theorized to be a general figure representing sloth, one of the seven deadly sins, to push the moral message and emphasize the “general theme of idleness or the foolish waste of time.”

== Role of Prostitution ==
Compared to other paintings and prints of her time, such as A Game of Tric-Trac in an Inn by Remigius Hogenberg, Leyster's identification of the woman in her painting as a prostitute is not as obvious. While she holds a glass of wine (a symbol which may have codified her profession) her clothing is more modest and domestic. It is, however, the lit pipe that she hands to her opponent that gives away her occupation. During Leyster's life time pijpen or "to pipe/to smoke a pipe" would have had explicit sexual connotations. Some critics, such as Cynthia Kartnehorst-Von Bogendorf Rupprath, argue that Leyster's work drives this point home as the man in the painting breaks the fourth wall, looking at the viewer as if asking his or her involvement in his decision. The direct gaze of the man in the foreground out towards the viewers not only draws in the viewer but also invites them to look closer at the multiple games being simultaneously played. “He holds the backgammon piece in his right hand and in his left, his cod piece — in Dutch, both stuks (“pieces”) — clearly suggesting he has won the game and a ‘game’ with this scarlet-sleeved woman.” Leyster intentionally created an ambiguous narrative of double entendres to articulate a moral critique of contemporary nightlife activities, but did so in such a way that “the message is more humorous than moralizing...so the viewer does not resent the lesson,” thereby creating a more productive message that is more likely to be well received by the viewer. Leyster's witty approach to the multiple games being simultaneously played and the accompanying visual components play into common motifs of seventeenth-century Dutch still life paintings, meaning the topic of this painting would have been familiar to the viewers.

== Style ==
Leyster's body of work focuses on genre paintings with “only one or a few figures” that create intimate scenes, further brought together by her stylistic use of lamp light. Leyster's choice to have this exchange take place at night with candlelight both adds an air of suspense and intrigue and showcases her mastery of and interest in lighting and shadows. While some scholars have argued that this emphasis on lighting brings to mind Leyster's potential influence from the Utrecht Caravaggisti others emphasize the painting's similarity in composition to her husband, Jan Miense Molenaer's early work Card Players by Lamplight. While both paintings employ similar lighting and idleness, the most convincing similarity is the mirrored image of Leyster's cavalier to the figure in Molenaer's foreground. Another notable feature in Leyster's painting is that the physical size of the painting is indicative of the intimate, domestic spaces in which this painting was intended to be viewed.

== See also ==
- List of paintings by Judith Leyster
