= Cyprian Thomas Rust =

Cyprian Thomas Rust (1808–1895) was an English cleric and Hebrew scholar. He combined commercial employment with spare-time linguistic studies.

== Life ==
Rust was born at Stowmarket, Suffolk, on 25 March 1808, the son of Thomas Rust (1774–1842), a leading tradesman and a prominent member of the Baptist Congregation in Stowmarket, and Ann Bridge (died 1810). He was educated at boarding school in Halesworth, then placed while a youth with a Spooner, Loggatt & Co, woollen merchants. His leisure, however, was taken with linguistic studies; he arranged in parallel columns for comparative purposes translations of the Scriptures in Hebrew, Greek, Latin and Syriac.

Rust joined the Baptist Church worshipping in Salem Chapel, Soho, and was baptised by John Stevens, the pastor on 30 June 1831. About 1836 he began to preach in various rooms and small chapels in the London suburbs, together with some other young men who devoted themselves on Sundays to this work. He entered the Particular Baptist ministry in 1837, and about this time married Elizabeth Maria Warren (1808–1887), only daughter of the late John Willing Warren, author of Ten Thousand a Year. Their one son was John Cyprian Rust. Cyprian became a Baptist preacher in London, then in 1838 pastor of the Baptist chapel, Eld Lane, Colchester. This he resigned in 1842 on account of ill health, but he remained at Colchester, taking literary and occasional ministerial work until 1849.

In that year Rust joined the Church of England and entered Queens' College, Cambridge, where he graduated LL.B. in 1856. Having been licensed to the perpetual curacy of St Michael at Thorn, Norwich, he was presented in 1860 by John Thomas Pelham, Bishop of Norwich, to the rectory of Heigham. This huge parish was later divided into three. Of these, Rust chose the new parish of Holy Trinity, South Heigham, where he became Rector on 2 April 1868. While in Norwich, he was active in most of the local religious and philanthropic movements and societies. In 1875, he was presented by the Bishop to the Rectory of Westerfield, a village two miles from Ipswich. He remained until 1890, then resigned under the Incumbents Resignation Act and moved to Soham, Cambridgeshire, where died on 7 March 1895 in the house of his only son, who was vicar of the parish. He was buried at Westerfield on 13 March.

== Works ==
In the late 1890s he published a pamphlet setting forth the scope and negative character of "the Higher Criticism," which drew from William Gladstone an acknowledgment of its value. He devoted much time to the study of the Great and Little Massora in Buxtorf's Rabbinical Bible. He was a diligent student of Hebrew, and took an interest in the controversies raised by the Higher criticism. While he was a member of the Baptist denomination, he wrote several pieces in prose and verse for Zion's Trumpet, and in 1845 he was a chief contributor to the Colchester Christian Magazine, if not editor of it. He reprinted some of these early writings under the title of Fragments in Prose and Verse. From 1864 to 1866 or thereabouts he wrote many articles in the Christian Advocate and Review (Hunt & Co) which was then edited by the Rev. Robert Hindes Groome, afterwards Archdeacon of Suffolk.
