= Seckford Hall =

Hotel

Coordinates: 52.08721°N 1.28570°E

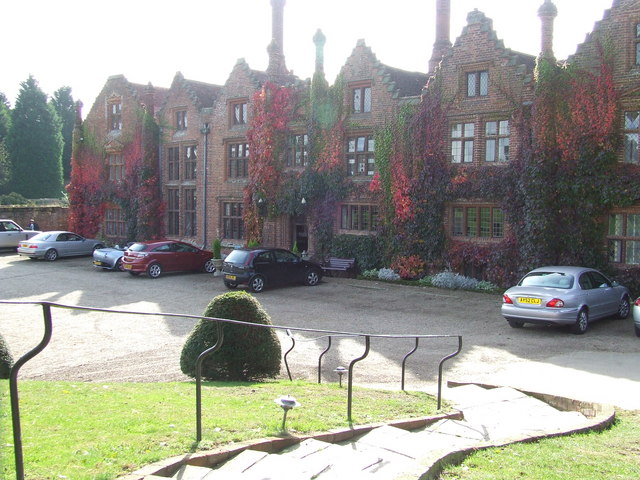
Seckford Hall, Woodbridge

Seckford Hall is a Tudor period house in Seckford Hall Road, Great Bealings, near Woodbridge, Suffolk. The hall is now a hotel.

The hall was constructed in the 1530s as the family home of Thomas Seckford. It is built of local brick in two storeys to an E-shaped plan with a 9-bay frontage. The hall passed down in the Seckford family until 1673, when it was bequeathed to Seckford Cage, after which it passed through several hands by purchase.

A wartime stay after leaving school in 1915 inspired a teenage Enid Blyton.

In May 1940 Sir Ralph Harwood purchased the neglected building from a demolition contractor, but it was soon afterwards commandeered by the Army for the duration of the Second World War. The property was returned after the war and early in 1946 Sir Ralph began to restore and modernise the property using materials rescued from other stately homes and churches. In 1950 the property was acquired by the Bunn family and converted to a hotel. The hotel is said to contain furniture that was once used in Buckingham Palace and Windsor Castle, including the chair that King Henry VII is said to have died on.

The hotel again changed hands in September 2012.
