= Westerfield =

Village in Suffolk, England

Coordinates: 52.083°N 1.172°E

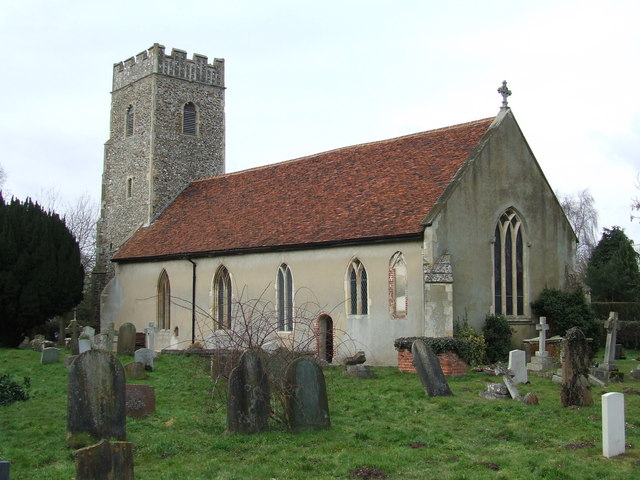
- Westerfield, Church of St Mary Magdalene

- Location within Suffolk
- Area: 3.07 km^{2} (1.19 sq mi)
- Population: 442 (2011)
  - Density: 144/km^{2} (370/sq mi)
- OS grid reference: TM1747
- District: East Suffolk
- Shire county: Suffolk
- Region: East
- Country: England
- Sovereign state: United Kingdom
- Post town: IPSWICH
- Postcode district: IP6
- Dialling code: 01473
- Police: Suffolk
- Fire: Suffolk
- Ambulance: East of England
- UK Parliament: Central Suffolk and North Ipswich

Westerfield is a village and civil parish in the East Suffolk district, in the county of Suffolk, England. It lies about two miles north of the centre of Ipswich and is served by Westerfield railway station on the Ipswich–Lowestoft East Suffolk Line.

== Amenities ==
Westerfield has two public houses, The Swan in northern Westerfield and The Westerfield Railway in the south. Both serve meals and contribute much to local social activity.

Central Westerfield has a village green adjacent to the medieval parish Church of St Mary Magdalene, where the East Anglian cleric and Hebrew scholar Cyprian Thomas Rust (1808–1895) is among those buried. It has fine stained glass windows, of which St Mary of Magdala was designed by William Morris.

== Population ==
The population of Westerfield with Culpho was estimated at 486 in 2019 and measured at 442 in the 2011 Census.

== History ==
Westerfield was in the Bosmere and Claydon hundred, in 1894 it became part of Woodbridge Rural District which became part of the administrative county of East Suffolk in 1889. On 31 December 1894 the parish of "Westerfield in Ipswich" was formed from the part of the parish in the County borough of Ipswich, on 1 April 1952 5 acres was transferred to Rushmere St Andrew parish. In 1974 it became part of Suffolk Coastal non-metropolitan district in the non-metropolitan county of Suffolk. On 1 April 1986 land was transferred from the Ipswich district to Westerfield and a parish council was formed. In 2019 it became part of East Suffolk district.
