= Playford, Suffolk =

Village in Suffolk, England

Coordinates: 52.086°N 1.235°E

Playford
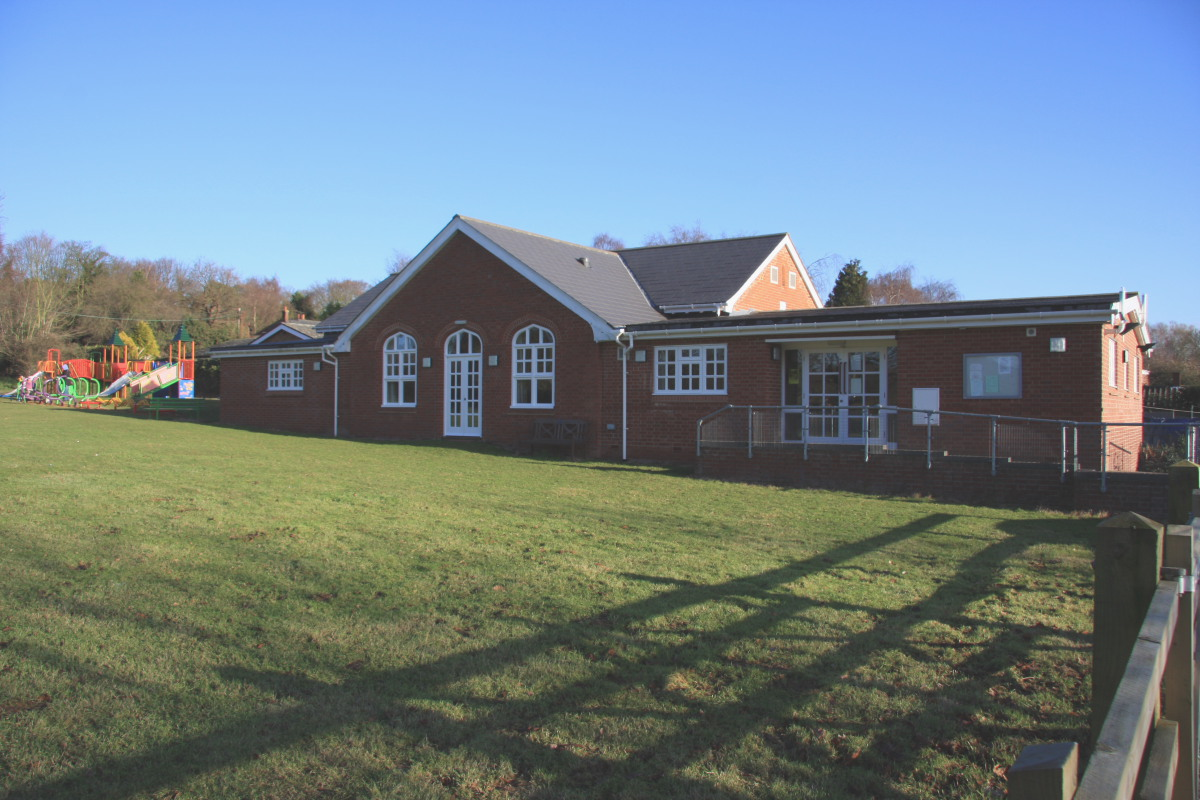
- The Village Hall

- Location within Suffolk
- Population: 215 (2011)
- OS grid reference: TM217480
- Civil parish: Playford
- District: East Suffolk
- Shire county: Suffolk
- Region: East
- Country: England
- Sovereign state: United Kingdom
- Post town: Ipswich
- Postcode district: IP6
- Dialling code: 01473
- Police: Suffolk
- Fire: Suffolk
- Ambulance: East of England
- UK Parliament: Central Suffolk and North Ipswich

Playford is a village and civil parish in the East Suffolk district, in Suffolk, England, on the outskirts of Ipswich. It has about 215 residents in 90 households. The name comes from the Old English plega meaning play, sport; used of a place for games, or a courtship or mating-place for animals, and the Old English ford meaning a place where a stream or river can be crossed. Villages nearby include Rushmere, Little Bealings, Great Bealings, Culpho and Grundisburgh. There are no pubs or shops in Playford, although it has a church (St Mary's) and a village hall.

== Notable residents ==
- Thomas Clarkson (1760-1846), the slave trade abolitionist, lived at Playford Hall from 1816 until his death and is buried in the churchyard. Insufficient credit has been given to Clarkson for his life's work: it was he who initiated the task, produced the necessary evidence and provided the momentum while William Wilberforce fought for the cause in Parliament.
- Lia Ditton (born 1980), sailor and rower
- Sir George Biddell Airy (1801–92) was the seventh Astronomer Royal from 1835 to 1881. Today he might also have been called Government Chief Scientist, for among his many accomplishments was the establishment of the Greenwich Meridian in 1884. There are craters on Mars and the moon named after him.
- Arthur Biddell (1783-1860) of Hill House, was a pre-eminent Suffolk farmer, an industrious land surveyor at the time of the tithe commutations and an inventor of agricultural machinery which was manufactured by his in-laws Ransomes, Sims & Jefferies of Ipswich.
- Francis Seymour Stevenson (1862-1938) of Playford Mount was Liberal MP for the Eye Division 1885–1906. His over-enthusiasm for the construction of the Mid-Suffolk Light Railway to help his rural constituents during the agricultural depression caused both his own bankruptcy and that of the railway for which he had to resign his seat. In 1895 he became the first chairman of Playford Parish Council.
- Sir William Aitken, a journalist and politician who was an MP for 14 years, and his wife, Penelope, Lady Aitken, a socialite nicknamed 'Pempe', also lived at Playford Hall. Their son is the disgraced former Conservative MP and Cabinet minister Jonathan Aitken. They are both buried in the churchyard of St Mary.
- Sir Thomas Felton, 4th Baronet, a politician of the late 17th and early 18th centuries, is buried in the chancel of the church.
- Anna Airy, artist.

== Gallery ==
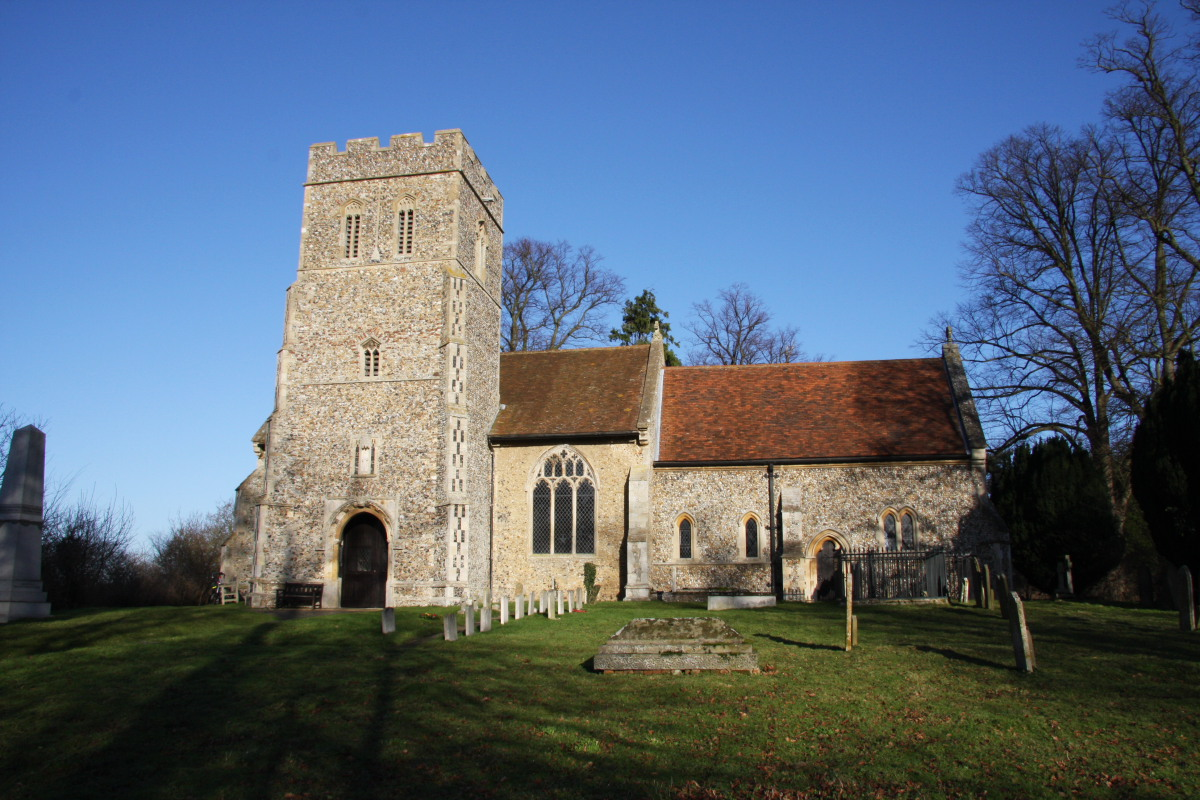
St Mary's church

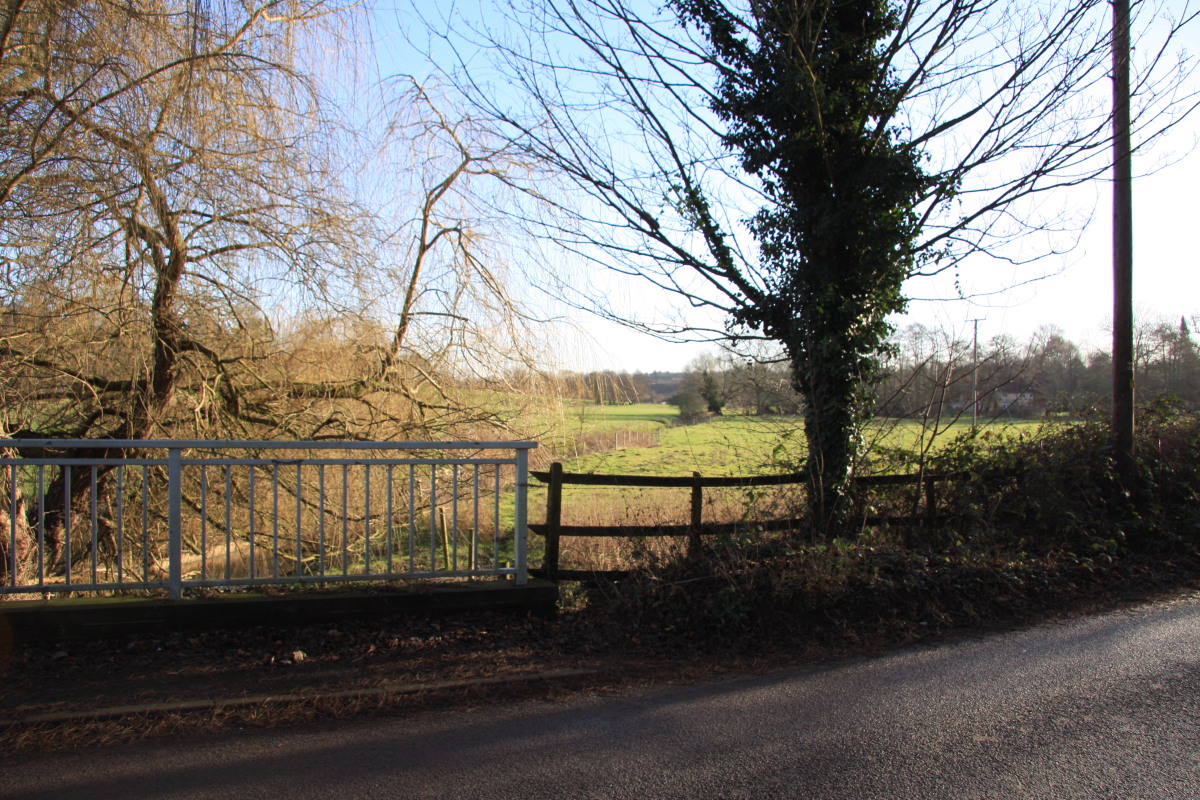
The Fynn Valley, from Playford bridge

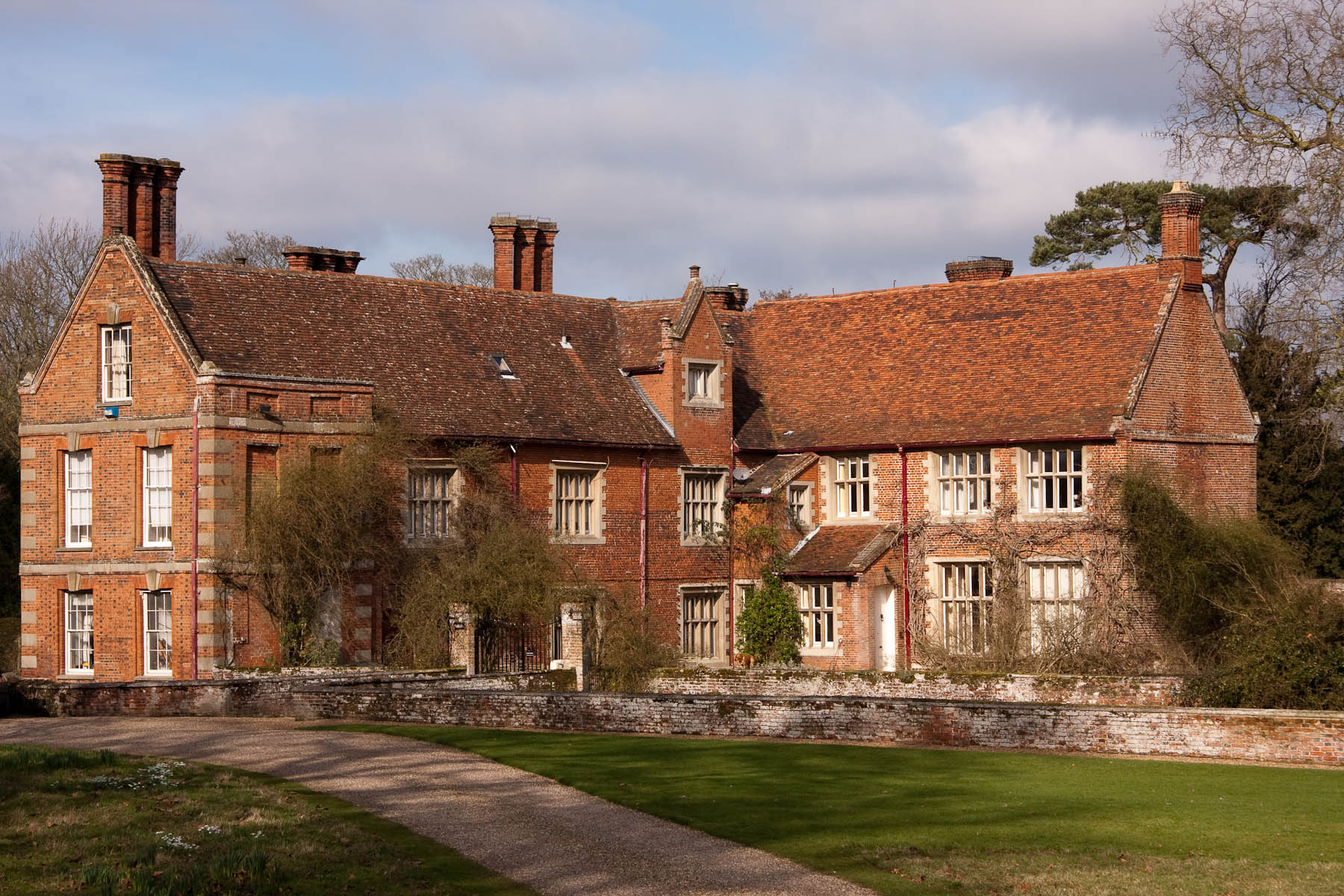
Playford Hall
