= Great Bealings =

Village in Suffolk, England

Coordinates: 52.094°N 1.257°E

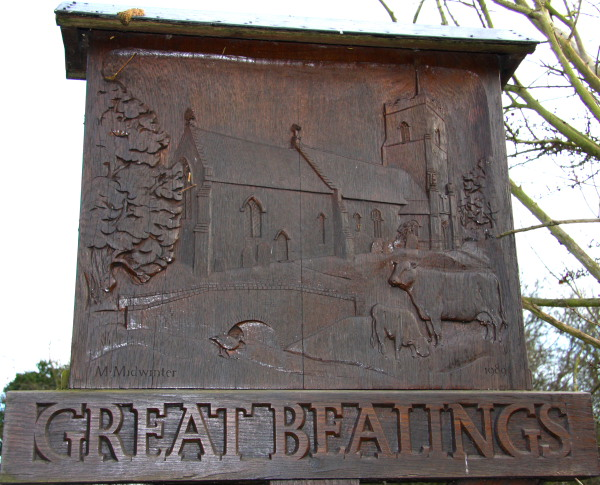
- Great Bealings village sign

- Location within Suffolk
- Area: 4.19 km^{2} (1.62 sq mi)
- Population: 302 (2011)
  - Density: 72/km^{2} (190/sq mi)
- OS grid reference: TM231489
- District: East Suffolk
- Shire county: Suffolk
- Region: East
- Country: England
- Sovereign state: United Kingdom
- Post town: Woodbridge
- Postcode district: IP13
- Dialling code: 01473
- Police: Suffolk
- Fire: Suffolk
- Ambulance: East of England
- UK Parliament: Central Suffolk and North Ipswich

Great Bealings is a small village in Suffolk, England. It has about 302 people living in it in around 113 households. Its nearest towns are Ipswich (6 miles (9.7 km) away) and Woodbridge (2.6 miles (4.2 km)). Nearby villages include Little Bealings, Playford, Culpho, Hasketon and Grundisburgh. The village does not have an obvious centre, and the population is split between two areas — one around Lower Street to the East of the village, and the other at Boot Street/Grundisburgh Road to the West of the village. St Mary's, the village church, is about in the middle of these two centres of population.

The village shares a playing field with Little Bealings, which is located behind the joint Village Hall, and includes a grassed plateau, a fenced and hard surfaced multi-sports court, children's play equipment, and a boules piste. It is named after John Ganzoni, Lord Belstead, who lived in the village for many years, and whose Charitable Trust Fund supported the project.

The River Lark passes through the middle of the village, and is crossed by the main road with a humpback bridge.

== History ==
In the Domesday Book there is mention of the Saxon Hall, owned by Halden, with Anund the priest in attendance. This was on the meadow by the church and was owned by several families such as the de Peche, Clench, and Majors, who knocked it down in 1775 to use the material to aid the construction of Bealings House.

The village has always had a strong agricultural base with several small farms. In White's gazetteer of Suffolk in 1855, the listed tradesmen are: brickmaker, two boot makers, builder, wheelwright, blacksmith, gardener, shopkeeper, and miller as well as several farmers and gentlemen.

=== Historical writings ===
In 1870–72, John Marius Wilson's Imperial Gazetteer of England and Wales described the village as:

BEALINGS (Great), a parish in Woodbridge district, Suffolk; on a branch of the Deben river, and on the East Suffolk railway, near Bealings station, 2¼. miles W by S of Woodbridge. Post Town, Little Bealings, under Woodbridge. Acres, 1,029. Real property, £2,091. Pop., 338. Houses, 88. The property is divided among a few; and much of it belongs to-Lord Henniker. The living is a rectory in the diocese of Norwich. Value, £250.* Patron, Lord Henniker. The church is good.

In 1887, John Bartholomew also wrote an entry on Great Bealings in the Gazetteer of the British Isles with a much shorter description:

Bealings, Great, par., E. Suffolk, 2½ miles W. of Woodbridge, 1036 ac., pop. 287.

== Notable residents ==
- The Seckford family had been landowners in the time of Edward I, with local benefactor Thomas Seckford rebuilding Seckford Hall as the country residence in 1530. He was a close advisor to Elizabeth I. His parents are buried in Great Bealings Church.
- Admiral Pelham Aldrich, who was Admiral-superintendent, Portsmouth, and attended several surveying expeditions around the world, was a resident and is buried in the churchyard and became the namesake of Mount Aldrich.
- Major Edward Moor. He served with the East India Company, being wounded three times, rising to the rank of brevet-captain. He was a Fellow of the Royal Society and an author on Indian mythology. He wrote the mystery, Bealings Bells, published in 1841, about an apparently haunted system of bell-pulls. In the 1820s, with the help of his son the Reverend Edward James Moor, he built a low pyramid southeast of Bealings House, about ten feet (three metres) high, of mixed found materials (including mill-wheels) but incorporating at the apex the triple-headed figure of Shiva and in a niche the seated figure of Brahma. These were found by Moor on Malabar Point, Bombay, and appear to be 11th century. His son-in-law William Page Wood, 1st Baron Hatherley PC, a lawyer and statesman who served as a Liberal Lord Chancellor from 1868 to 1872 in William Ewart Gladstone's first ministry, is buried in the churchyard.
- General Sir Richard Thomas Farren GCB, a British Army officer who became General Officer Commanding Eastern District lived in Bealings House form before 1891 and was buried in the churchyard on 4 January 1910 aged 92 years. There is a memorial to him within the church.
- Winifred Beech, the author and wife of Sir John Fortescue, was born in Great Bealings rectory, the daughter of Rector Howard Beech, in 1888.
- John Ganzoni, 2nd Baron Belstead, Baron Ganzoni PC, a Conservative politician and peer who served as Leader of the House of Lords under Margaret Thatcher from 1988 to 1990, is buried in the churchyard.
- Cynthia Cooke (1919-2016), military nurse and nursing administrator who served as Matron-in-Chief of the Queen Alexandra's Royal Naval Nursing Service, the nursing branch of Her Majesty's Naval Service. She was appointed a Commander of the Order of St John in 1974, and a Commander of the Order of the British Empire in the 1975 Birthday Honours.

== Rectors of the Parish ==
Plaques in the church list the following Rectors:

Anund the Priest	1086
Mathew de Stanton	1306
Geoffrey de Banhale	1307
Richard de Westhorpe	1331
Reginald Bustard	1338
Stephen de Duddeley	1341
Robert de Appleton	1343
Radulphus de Ipswich	1349
Nicholas de Lydgate	1349
John Joye	1350
William de Drayton	1352
Robert de Hethe	1375
John Tubbyng	1395
John Stratton	1407
William Jowle	1448
Robert Coppyng	1464
John Jacob	1476
Richard Williamson	1517
John Walker	1517
John Fayerthwat	1536
Robert Baxter	1542
Robert Gybsonne	1560
Richard Larwood	1566
Robert Hutchinson M.A.	1607
William Gibbins B.A.	1629
Edmund Smith B.A.	1653
Edmund Brome	1672
Richard Cavell	1719
Robert Hingeston M.A.	1726
W^{m} Dobbyns Humphrey	1766
Philip Meadows B.A.	1804
W^{m} Chafie Henniker M.A.	1838
Edward Jas. Moor B.A.	1844
Howard Beech M.A.	1886
Francis B Champion M.A.	1917
Frank Mitton	1930
George H Round-Turner	1936
David T Jarvis B.A.	1945
John McMillen O.C.S.	1954
Denis Spencer A.K.C.	1956
J G Steven A.L.C.D H.C.R	1970
Frank Hollingsworth	1975
Michael Skliros	1991
Christine Everett	1996
Pauline Stentiford	2003
Celia Cook	2015

== Images of Great Bealings ==
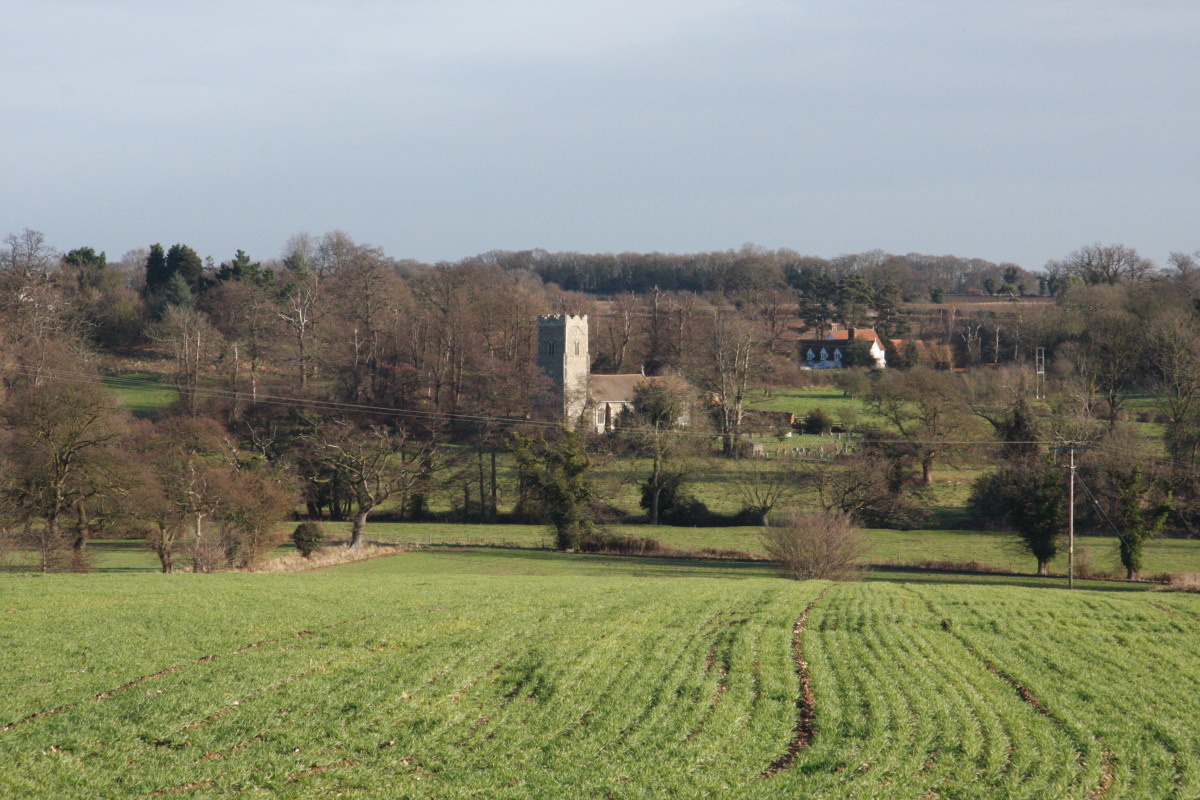
St Mary's church from over the Lark

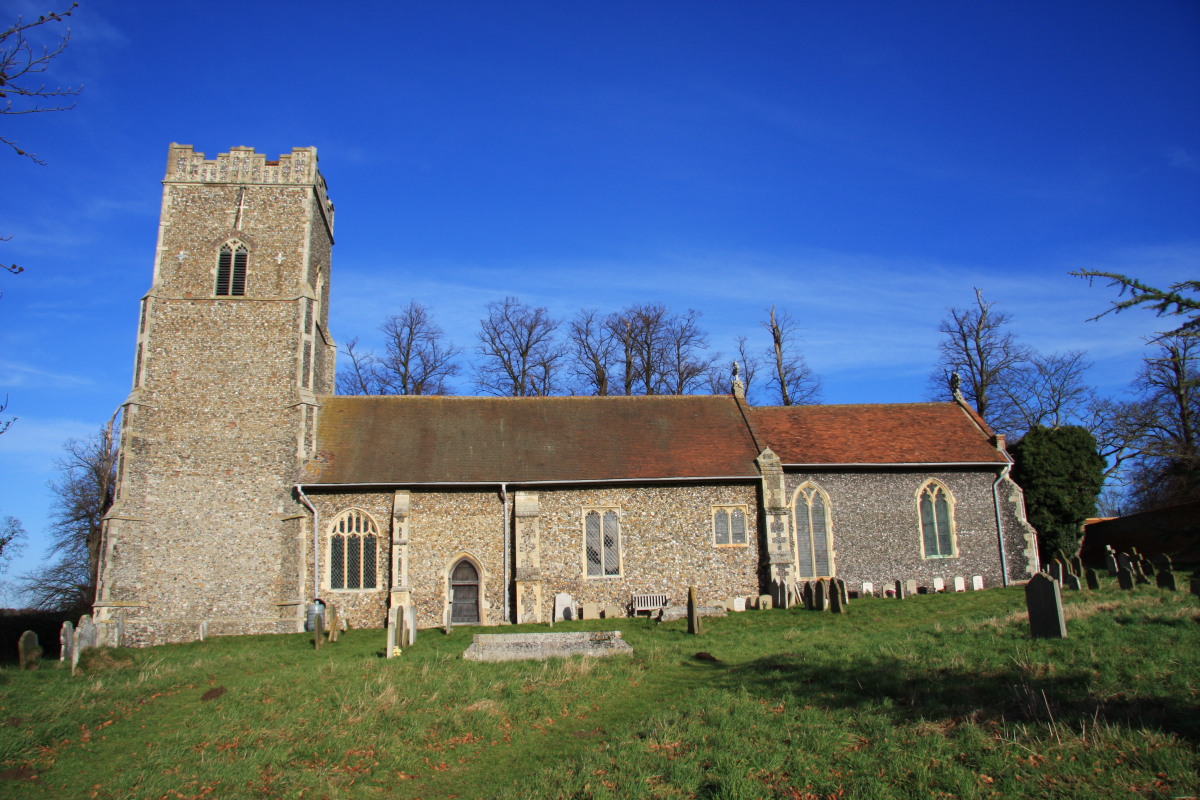
And from its churchyard

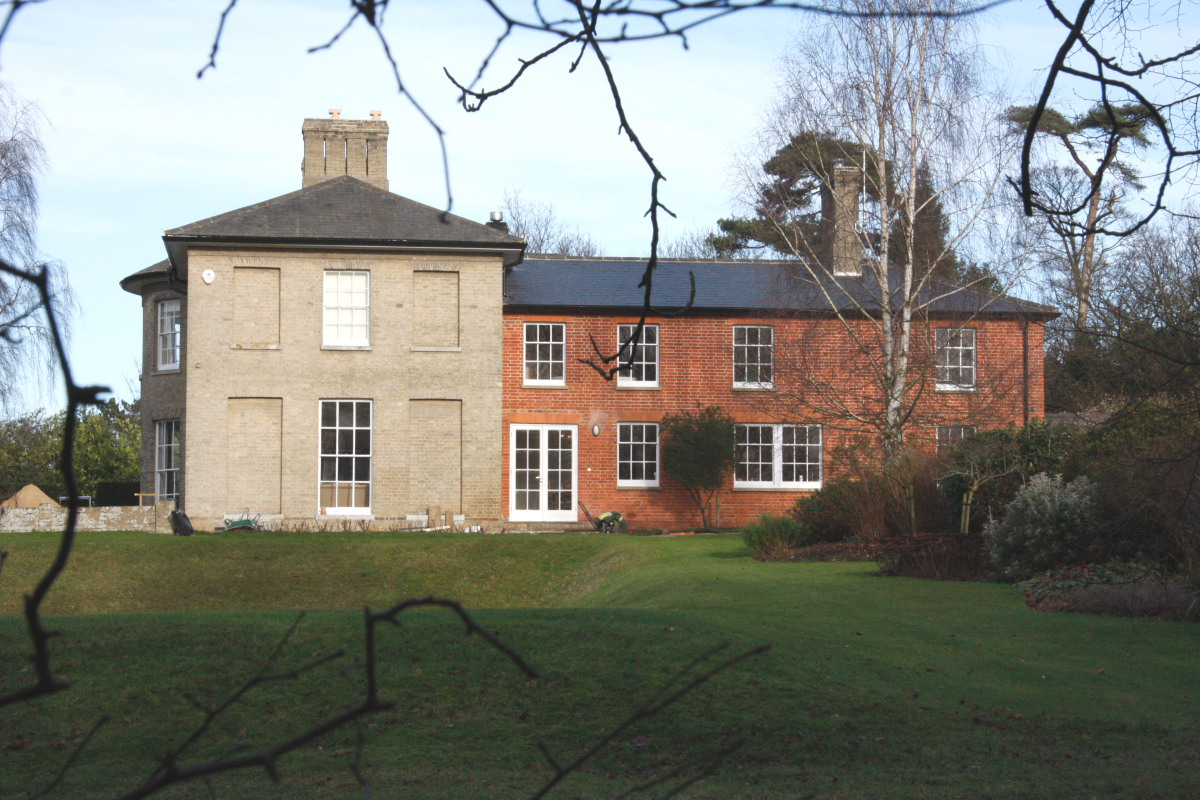
The old vicarage - Lord Belstead's home until his death

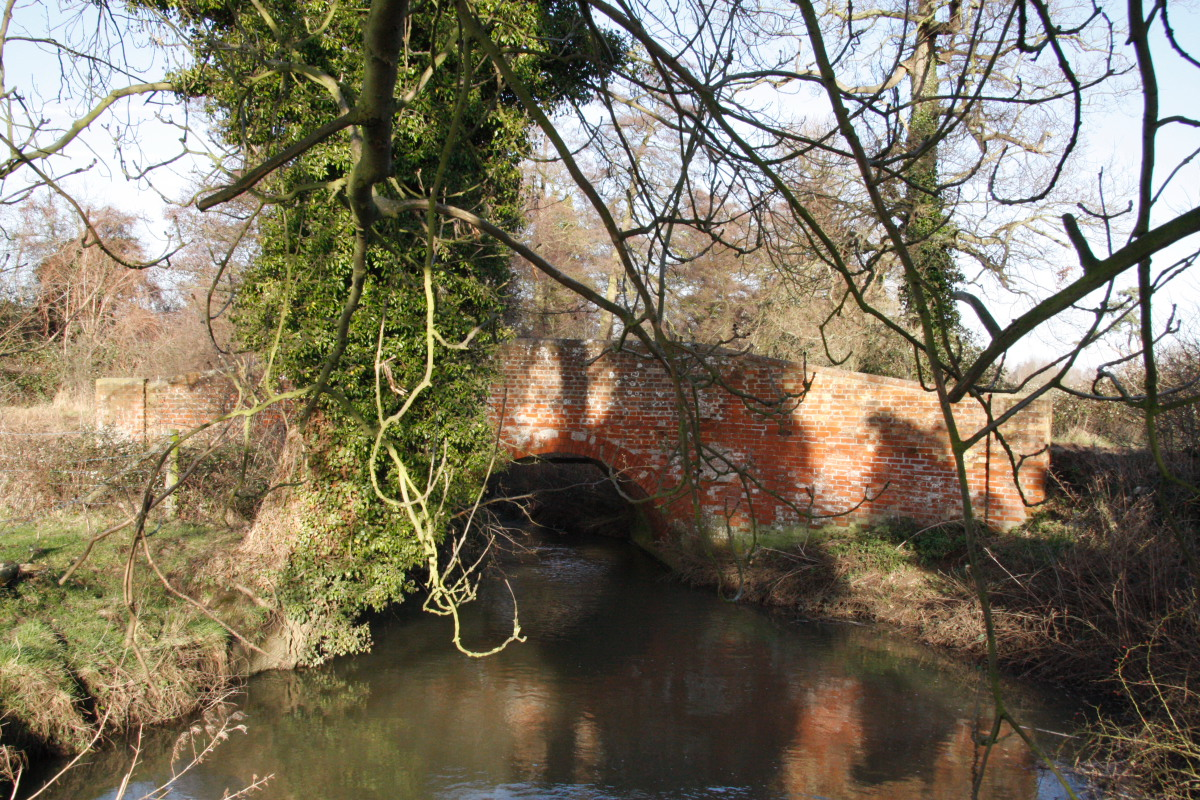
The hump-backed bridge

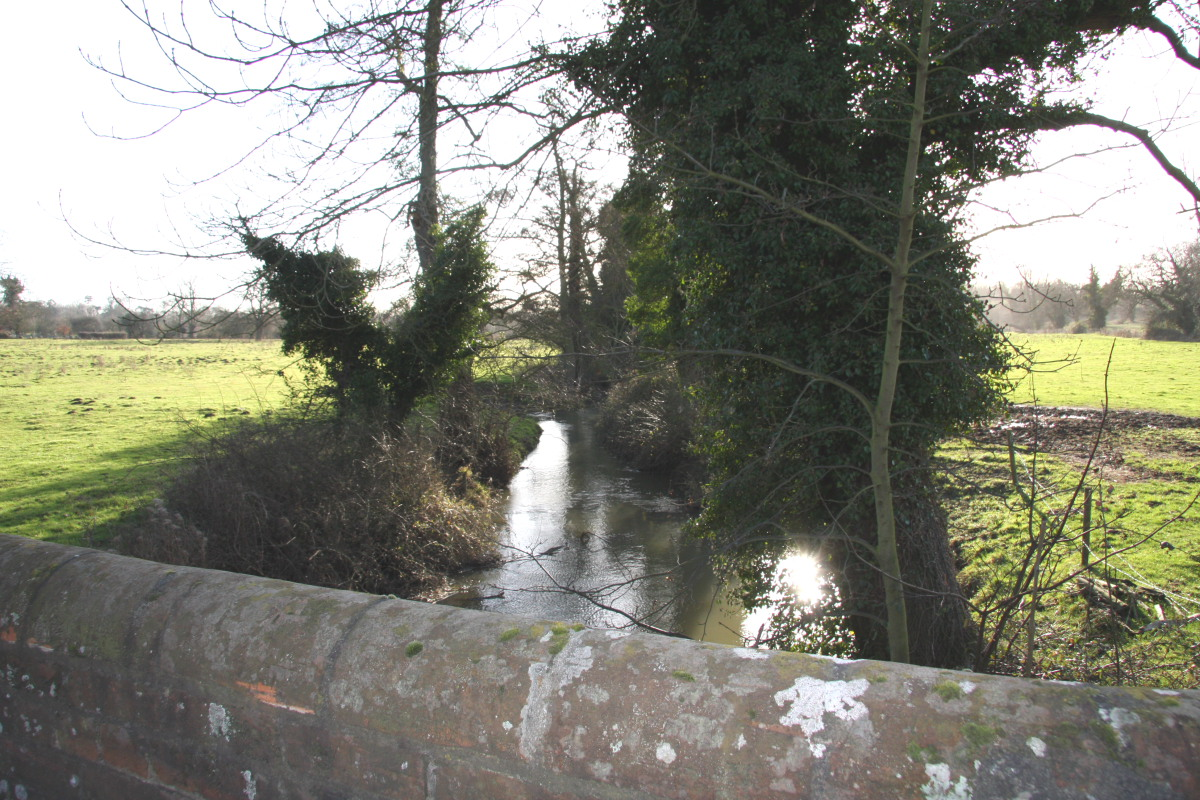
The River Lark from the bridge

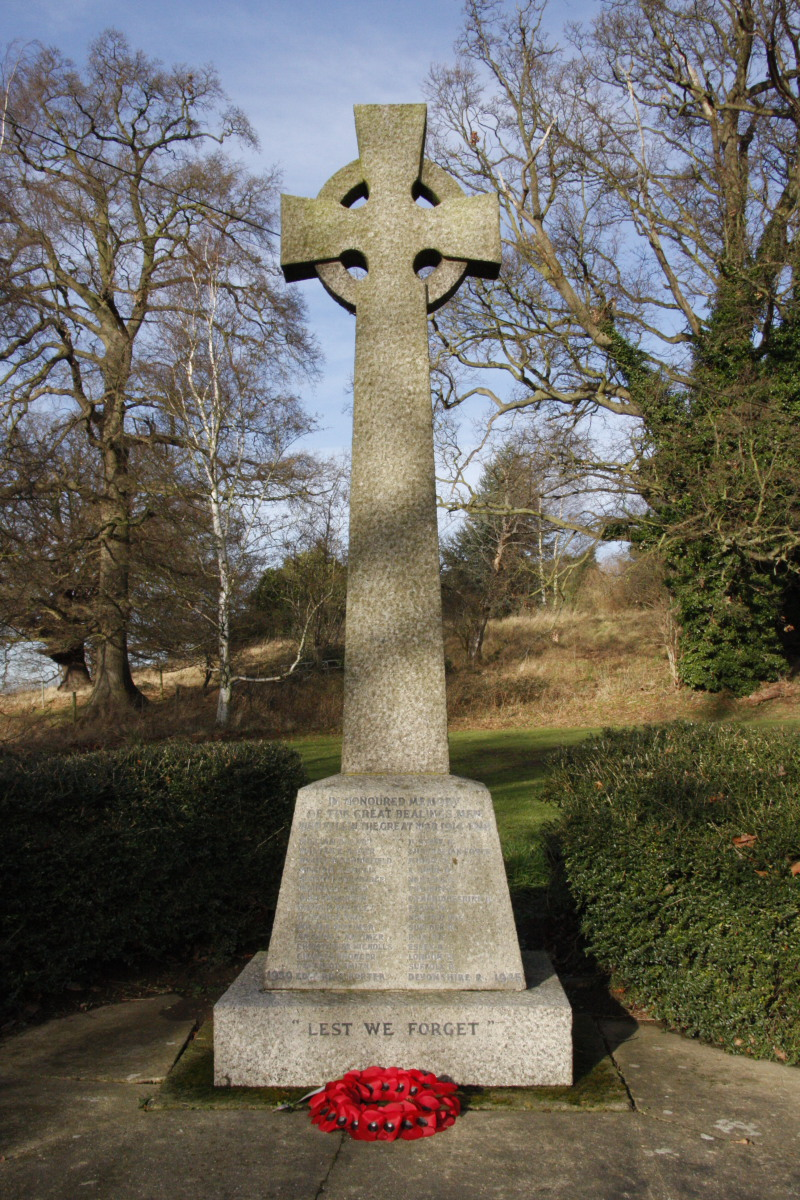
The war memorial

== Related pages ==
- Little Bealings
- Bealings railway station
- Seckford Hall
