= Culpho =

Village in Suffolk, England

Coordinates: 52.096°N 1.225°E

- St Botolph's parish church

- Location within Suffolk
- Population: 48 (2021 census)
- Civil parish: Culpho
- District: East Suffolk
- Shire county: Suffolk
- Region: East
- Country: England
- Sovereign state: United Kingdom
- Post town: Ipswich
- Postcode district: IP6
- Dialling code: 01473
- Police: Suffolk
- Fire: Suffolk
- Ambulance: East of England
- UK Parliament: Central Suffolk and North Ipswich

Culpho (pronounced Cul-fo) is a village and civil parish in the East Suffolk district of Suffolk, about 4 miles (6.4 km) northeast of the centre of Ipswich and 3 1/2 miles (5.6 km) west of Woodbridge. In 2021 the parish had a population of 48.

Other neighbouring villages include Great Bealings, Westerfield, and Playford. From 1974 to 2019 it was in Suffolk Coastal district.

== Toponym ==
The earliest known record of the toponym is Culfole in the Domesday Book of 1086, which list the population as 22 households. In 12th-century records it appears as Colfho in 1168, Culfou in 1169 and Culfo in 1175. A pipe roll of 1178 records it as Culfho and an entry in the Book of Fees for 1250 records it as Colvesho. It is derived from Old English, probably meaning "Cūþwulf's hōh" (hōh = "spur of land").

== Parish church ==
The earliest parts of the Church of England parish church of St Botolph include the chancel, which is 13th-century. The nave has 14th-century features including a doorway and windows. There is also a 14th-century piscina in the chancel. The baptismal font is 15th-century. The church has a southwest tower with the porch built into its ground stage. The nave roof was rebuilt with new timbers in the 17th century.

The church was restored in 1884. It is a grade II* listed building.

St Botolph's church was granted to the Premonstratensian Leiston Abbey in the 13th century. The parish is now part of a shared benefice with Great Bealings, Little Bealings and Playford.

== Thankful village ==
Culpho is one of the Thankful Villages, the few dozen parishes in England and Wales that suffered no fatalities in the First World War. A glass-tile plaque by Powell of London was dedicated inside St Botolph's Church in 1920 to commemorate the safe return of the village's servicemen.

Culpho is featured on Darren Hayman's album, Thankful Villages Volume 1.

== Bibliography ==
- Ekwall, Eilert (1960) [1936]. Concise Oxford Dictionary of English Place-Names (4th ed.). Oxford: Oxford University Press. Culpho. ISBN 0198691033.
- Lewis, Samuel, ed. (1931) [1848]. A Topographical Dictionary of England. Vol. I (Seventh ed.). London: Samuel Lewis. pp. 746–751.
- Page, William, ed. (1907). A History of the County of Suffolk. Victoria County History. Vol. II: Ecclesiastical History, Religious Houses, Political History, Maritime History, Industries, Schools, Sport, Agriculture, Forestry. Westminster: Archibald Constable & Co. pp. 117–119.
- Pevsner, Nikolaus; Radcliffe, Enid (revision) (1974) [1961]. Suffolk. The Buildings of England. Harmondsworth: Penguin Books. p. 182. ISBN 0-14-071020-5.
