= Remigius Hogenberg =

Remigius Hogenberg (c. 1536, Mechlin – c. 1588, London) was a Dutch engraver who arrived in England c. 1573. He most likely resided in the parish of St Giles Cripplegate, this parish and St Andrew's Holborn being the main locations for engravers. Parish records list Hogenberg as "Highill", an English approximation of his surname. The parish records also indicate Hogenberg had seven children, though his marriage is not recorded. Hogenberg is recorded as having been buried on 16 March 1588 (old style, 1589 new style). Hogenberg is known for his portrait engravings of the Archbishop of Canterbury, a genealogy of the English monarchs, and his Maps of the Counties of England.
