= Little Bealings =

Village in Suffolk, England

Coordinates: 52.0844°N 1.253°E

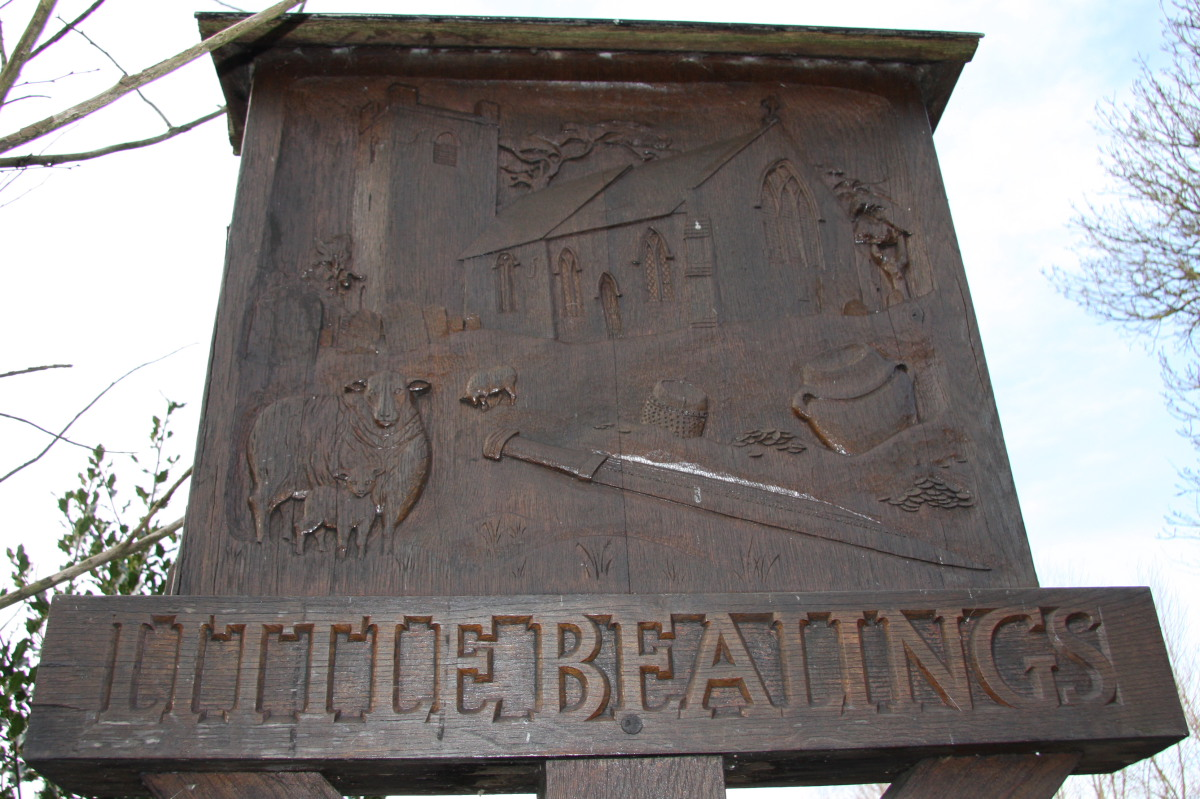
- Little Bealings village sign

- Location within Suffolk
- Population: 420 (2011)
- OS grid reference: TM229478
- District: East Suffolk
- Shire county: Suffolk
- Region: East
- Country: England
- Sovereign state: United Kingdom
- Post town: Woodbridge
- Postcode district: IP13
- Dialling code: 01473
- Police: Suffolk
- Fire: Suffolk
- Ambulance: East of England
- UK Parliament: Central Suffolk and North Ipswich

Little Bealings is a village in Suffolk, England. It has a population of approximately 470 people living in around 185 households. The population had fallen to 420 at the 2011 Census. Its nearest towns are Ipswich (5.1 miles (8.2 km) away) and Woodbridge (3.1 miles (5.0 km) away). Nearby villages include Great Bealings, Playford, Culpho, Martlesham and Grundisburgh.

The village contains a school, a village hall and a meeting room called the Angela Cobbold Memorial Hall. Its pub, the Admiral's Head, closed on 20 July 2012.

Until 1956 the village had an active railway station. This was closed as part of the 1950s rail closure programme, prior to the Beeching Axe. The station is now used as commercial office premises. The railway line running through the station remains active, as part of the Ipswich to Lowestoft line, and crosses the main street at an automatic level crossing.

Little Bealings' church is All Saints, part of a shared benefice with Great Bealings, Playford and Culpho.

The Grove, an old house and estate in the village, was the childhood home of Sidney Colvin, the curator, critic, and great friend of Robert Louis Stevenson.

== Gallery ==
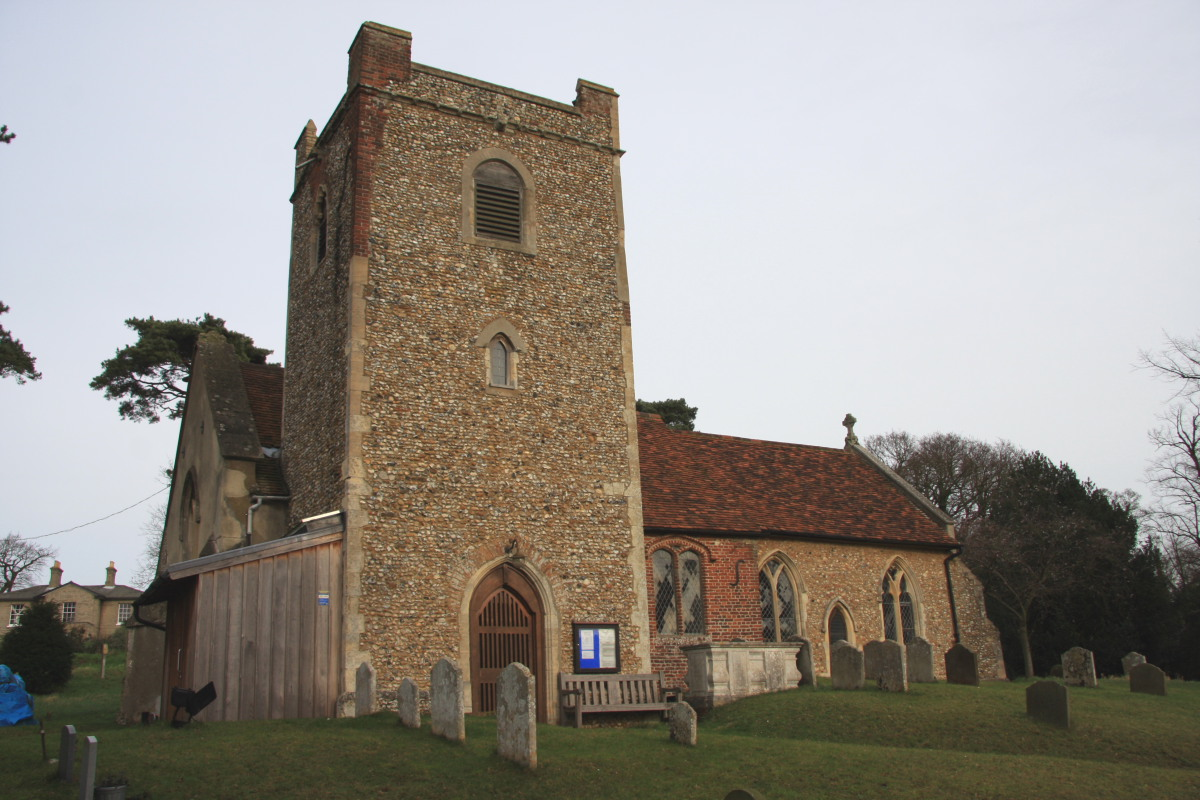
All Saints church

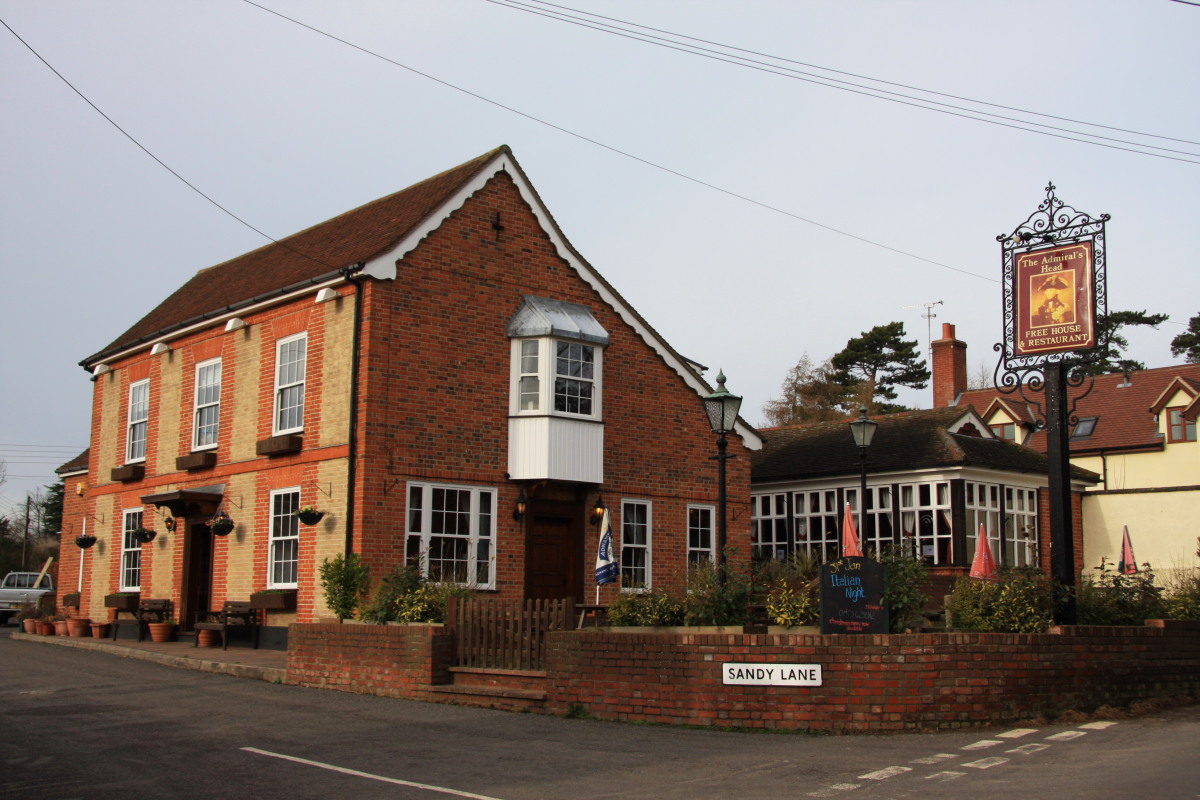
The Admiral's Head Public House

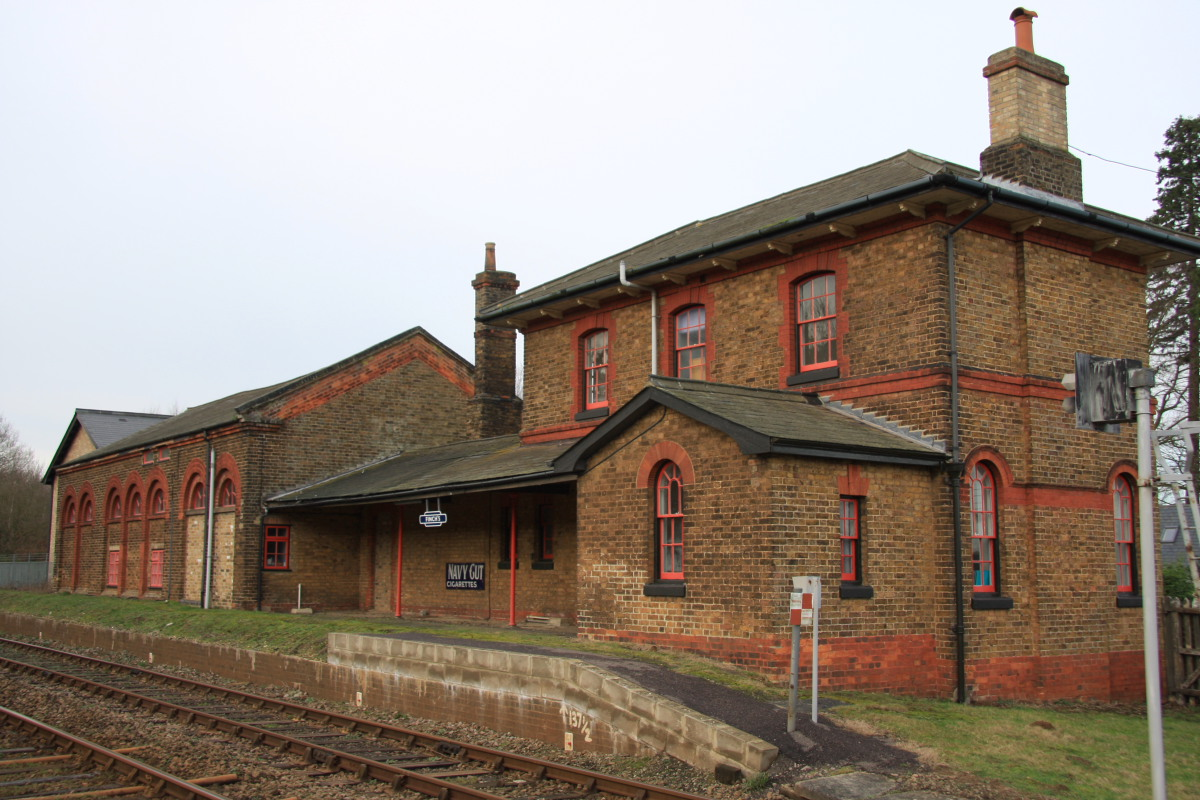
Bealings railway station

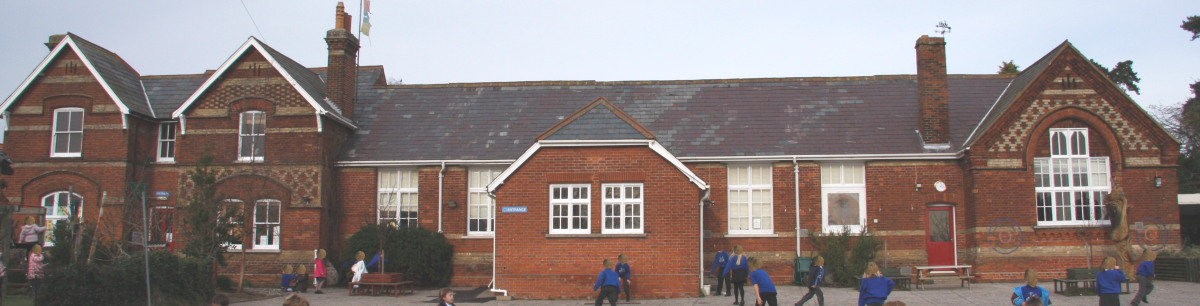
Bealings school
