= Hasketon =

Village in Suffolk, England

Coordinates: 52.10818°N 1.28156°E

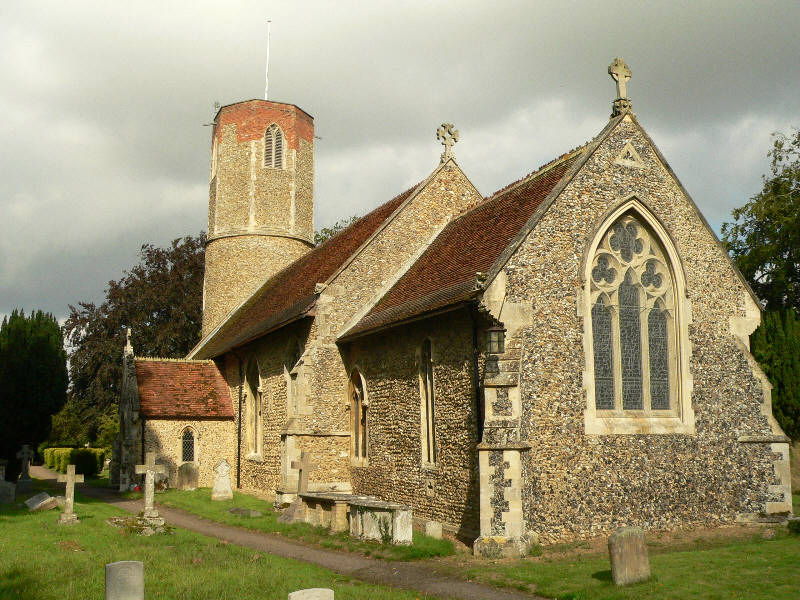
- St Andrew’s Church, Hasketon

- Location within Suffolk
- Area: 6.81 km^{2} (2.63 sq mi)
- Population: 402 (2011)
  - Density: 59/km^{2} (150/sq mi)
- OS grid reference: TM248506
- District: East Suffolk
- Shire county: Suffolk
- Region: East
- Country: England
- Sovereign state: United Kingdom
- Post town: Woodbridge
- Postcode district: IP13
- Dialling code: 01473
- Police: Suffolk
- Fire: Suffolk
- Ambulance: East of England
- UK Parliament: Central Suffolk and North Ipswich

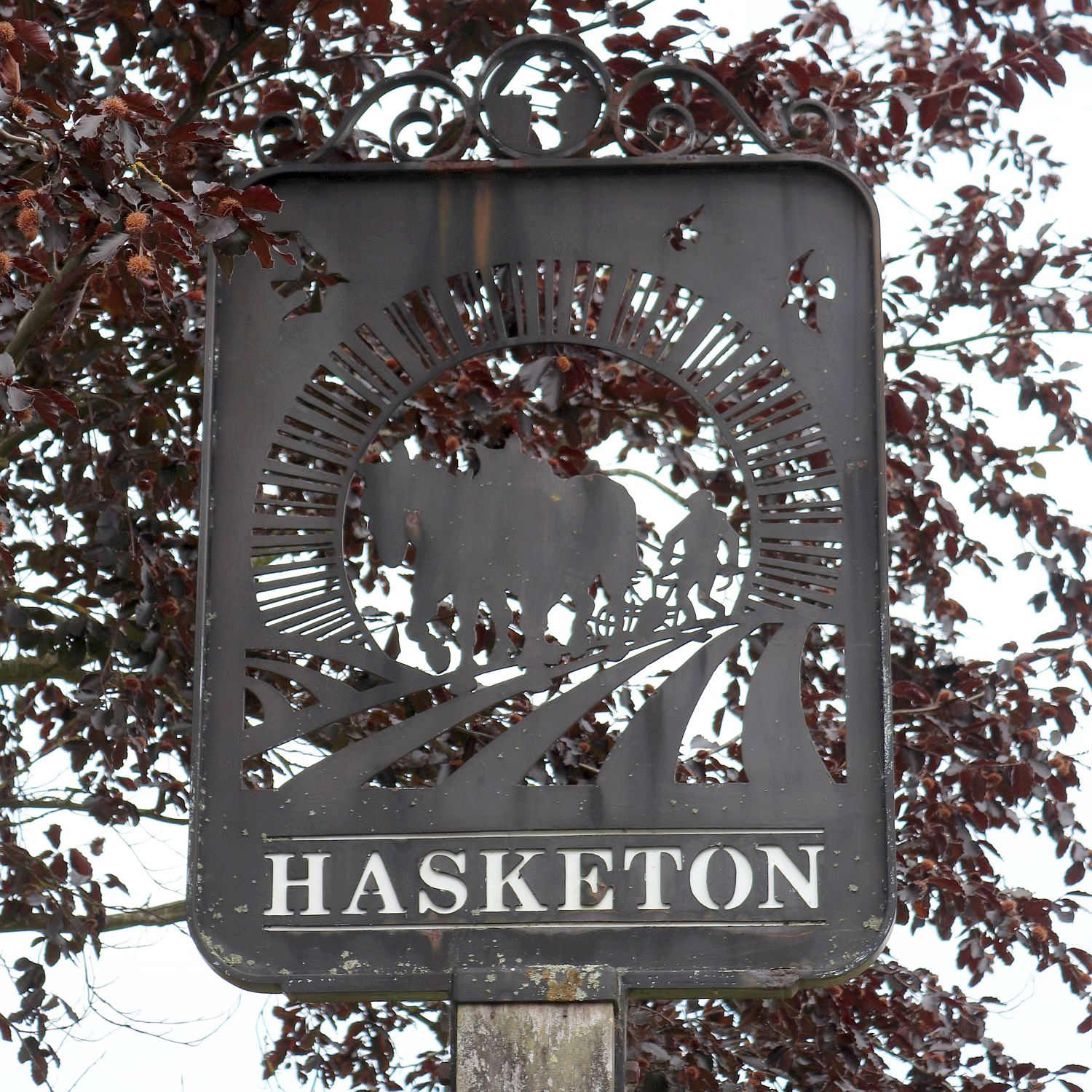
Hasketon Village Sign

Hasketon is a village and civil parish in the East Suffolk District of Suffolk, England.

Its church, St. Andrews, is one of 38 existing round-tower churches in Suffolk. St. Andrews stands more or less at the centre of its scattered parish, and is set in a tree-shaded churchyard which, in 1845, had been planted with beech, fir and elm.

== History of St Andrews Church ==
There has been a church at this place for more than 900 years. This ancient church contains craftsmanship from many periods. From what can be seen and derived from what little documentary evidence is available, the history of this church is as follows:

The 11th century: The earliest part of the present church is the nave, where evidence of late Saxon or early Norman work in the layered masonry with which parts of the walls are faced can be found. There is also a little herring-bone masonry in the south wall, where there remains a tiny blocked window of this date. Clearly the core of the nave dates from the period just before or just after the Norman Conquest of 1066.

The late 11th or early 12th century: A little later the round tower was added at the west end of the nave.

The 13th century: The single lancet windows in the north walls of the nave and chancel survive from this period.

c.1300: The round tower was heightened by the addition of its octagonal belfry-stage (later restored with brick) and also received its west window. Some similar windows to those in the belfry-stage were placed in the nave and chancel. The 14th and early 15th centuries: Several of the present windows in the nave and the chancel date from this time; they probably replaced earlier windows like the blocked 11th century one. The north and south doorways are also of 14th century date.

At the Reformation and afterwards, the interior of the church was altered to cater for the new liturgical requirements of the established church. Much of the colour and carvings went, also the stained glass and the rood with its loft and screen.

The year 1844 saw the arrival of new rector Thomas Maude, and it was he who was responsible for the restoration of the church by gradual stages. The font – originally given c.1450 by members of the Brewse family, who owned the manor of Hasketon from the late 13th century until c.1489 – was cleaned and restored shortly after the arrival of Maude, and a small gallery at the west end of the nave was replaced by a carved wooden tower screen. The major restoration took place during the 1860s. In 1863, work was done on the nave, the church was re-roofed, the chancel restored and the vestry added in 1865. The nave received a new set of benches in 1866, and two years later the porch was rebuilt. In 1899, a new bell was given and three others recast.

The present organ was given in 1904, the year the choir-stalls were also made. The reredos was erected in 1920.

Additions of recent years include among others the interior decoration, the kneelers, the festal frontal and the list of Rectors.

Today, the building is still in regular use for Christian worship.

Peggy Harrison (1907-1993), the widow of Sir James Harwood Harrison, 1st Baronet (1907-1980), a Conservative Party politician, is buried in the churchyard. He is buried at Bugbrooke, Northamptonshire where his family lived for many years.

== Sources ==
1. St Andrew’s, Hasketon Church Guide by Roy Tricker, Gyppeswyk Print, Ipswich 2001
