= Thomas Alvard =

Thomas Alvard may refer to:

- Thomas Alvard (merchant, born 1460) (1460–1504), Ipswich merchant
- Thomas Alvard (Ipswich MP) (1493–1535), Ipswich merchant and MP, son of the above
