= St Peter & Paul Priory, Ipswich =

Monastery in Ipswich, Suffolk, England

St Peter & Paul Priory, Ipswich was an Augustinian priory in Ipswich Suffolk, England.

== Foundation ==
The Priory of St Peter and St Paul was established in Ipswich in the 12th century. A list of religious houses of the late 12th century by Gervase of Canterbury names two priories of black canons in the town, this one and the Priory of the Holy Trinity, Ipswich. However, a reference relating to Henry I (died 1135) cites ‘my canons of my alms in Ipswich’ so one or both of these priories could date from the earlier part of this century.

The Domesday Book indicates a church of St Peter in 1086 held by Aeschere with one acre. It is likely that both this and Holy Trinity are examples of existing churches that came to adopt Augustinian rule as Priories in the 12th century. An early record clearly showing the Priory’s establishment comes in 1198 when there is the gift of a pension of six marks by Ernald de Coleville and his wife to ‘the church of the apostles Peter and Paul and the canons’.

Tradition holds that the priory was founded by ancestors of Thomas de Lacy and Alice his wife (who, in 1344, obtained licence to alienate land and the advowson of Duxford church to the priory). However, the crown had claimed patronage early on, certainly by the reign of Henry III, and continued thereafter to appoint the Prior.

== The Austin canons (Augustinians) ==
The 12th century was a period when very many communities of canons were set up across Western Europe. The majority adopted the Rule of St Augustinebecoming known as either Augustinian or Austin canons, also termed ‘black canons’ (because of the colour of their habits). They were priests who took public vows – stability (lifelong service to one priory), holding only common property, chastity, poverty and obedience. Whilst they lived in communities like monks, they had more contact with the outside community and differed in necessarily being priests.

== Location ==
The present-day redundant church of St Peter is south of central Ipswich and a short distance above the docks on the river Orwell, but that was wider in medieval times and so would have flowed close by the Priory (hence the church was known also as St Peter by the Waterfront). The exact location of the priory buildings and associated land is unknown but was likely to the north and east of the church; in Taylor’s Index Monasticus, the extent is given as six acres.

== The Priory History ==
Sporadic records remain that refer to the priory at intervals during its existence.

Letheringham manor was gifted to this Ipswich Priory around the end 12th/early 13th century. A small off-shoot cell of Austin canons (about five) was set up there, forming the new Letheringham Priory.

In 1291, the records of Taxatio Ecclesiastica show a substantial income coming to St Peter & St Paul Priory, based on the appropriation of the churches of St Peter, St Nicholas and St Clement in Ipswich, the rectories of Cretingham and Wherstead, plus part of Swineland (now Swilland). These all added up to provide the sizeable sum of £82 7s 5d.

In 1297 the Priory was host to a royal retinue when King Edward I came with his youngest daughter, Elizabeth of Rhuddlan who, on 8 January, married John, Count of Holland in the church of St Peter and St Paul. The importance of Ipswich as a trading port (exporting cloth and wool) and the site’s easy access by sea would have made this a convenient and symbolically significant venue to choose.

The early decades of the 14th century saw the Priory gain further lands and donations. However, there were also obligations to provide long-term board and sustenance to individuals nominated by the Crown, until a grant by Edward III in 1330 ended the practice.

At times, laxity in the behaviour of the incumbents was noted. Prior Godwyn (1514–26) complained ’the brethren did not duly rise for mattins’. The lack of a schoolmaster around this time was particularly noted and, on his visitation in July 1526, Bishop Richard Nykke urged the provision of a teacher of grammar for the novices.

Cardinal Thomas Wolsey’s plan to establish Cardinal’s College in Ipswich required the suppression of this Priory and was approved by a special bull from Pope Clement in May 1528. However, Wolsey soon after fell from favour, halting the development of the college. King Henry VIII then granted this site to Thomas Alvard, an Ipswich merchant and gentleman usher of the king’s chamber.

Taylor refers to an original deed from Wolsey (Hampton Court, dated 7 August 1528) concerning Cardinal’s College and the old Priory (called ‘monastery’ in the deed). This indicates that ‘…several parish churches, with their rights and emoluments, attached to the said monastery, were also abolished, the church of St Peter being of their number’. It later refers to ‘the aforesaid college, where the church of St Peter formerly was.’. However, it is clear that parts of St Peter’s church are much older than this period, so it may have been shut down at that period but not physically destroyed, unlike the priory buildings, none of which survived.
