= Hoo, Suffolk =

Village in Suffolk, England

Coordinates: 52.182°N 1.299°E

Hoo
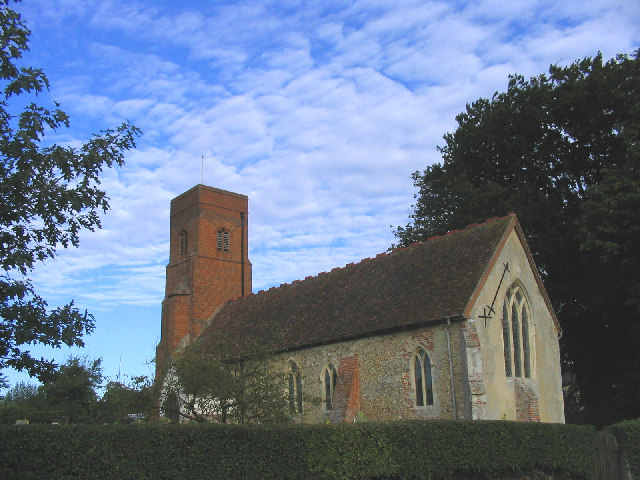
- The church of St Andrew and St Eustachius in Hoo

- Location within Suffolk
- Area: 9.52 km^{2} (3.68 sq mi) inc the parish of Letheringham
- Population: 160 (2011) inc the parish of Letheringham
  - Density: 17/km^{2} (44/sq mi)
- OS grid reference: TM256589
- Civil parish: Hoo
- District: East Suffolk
- Shire county: Suffolk
- Region: East
- Country: England
- Sovereign state: United Kingdom
- Post town: WOODBRIDGE
- Postcode district: IP13
- Dialling code: 01473
- UK Parliament: Central Suffolk and North Ipswich

Hoo is a village and civil parish in the East Suffolk district of the English county of Suffolk. It is located 3 miles (4.8 km) north-west of the town of Wickham Market and 3 miles (4.8 km) south-west of Framlingham. The parish lies to the south of the River Deben – neighbouring villages include Kettleburgh, Charsfield and Letheringham. The parish council is combined with Cretingham and Monewden, with Hoo itself having one of the smallest populations in Suffolk with 86 residents recorded at the 2001 census. At the 2011 Census, the parish was recorded in combination with Letheringham giving a total population of 160.

The parish church, located to the north of the village centre and adjacent to Hoo Hall, is a Grade II* Listed building. It is dedicated to St Andrew and St Eustachius and dates from the 13th century with a 15th-century tower. The ecclesiastical parish is joined with Charsfield and services are still held regularly in the church which was threatened with redundancy in the 1970s. The church was used as a location in the 1974 film Akenfield.

Hoo Hall is a 16th-century building with Grade II listed status. The parish has a number of other 16th-century buildings and two medieval moated sites to the south of the village centre, both scheduled monuments. Godwin's Place is a Grade II listed 16th century house, built on the site of larger house built in the 15th century by John Godyn or Godwyn.
