= St Nicholas' Church, Ipswich =

Church in Ipswich, Suffolk, England

St Nicholas' Church, Ipswich is a medieval church in Ipswich. Maintained by the Ipswich Historic Churches Trust, it is currently used by the Diocese of St Edmundsbury & Ipswich as a conference centre and is adjacent to the diocesan offices, and the bishops' offices. The church dates from 1300 and was substantially refitted in 1849. The fifteenth century tower was rebuilt in 1886.

== St Nicholas Parish ==
St Nicholas was a parish church and in the late medieval times this parish was part of Ipswich south ward, along with the parish of St Peters.

== Bells ==
The church has a ring of 5 bells all but the 2nd were cast by Henry Pleasant of Sudbury in 1706. The second was cast by Miles I Graye of Colchester in 1630. All 5 bells hang in oak frame dating from c.1706.

Bells of St Nicholas', Ipswich
Bell	Date	Note	Diameter	Founder	Weight		
Bell	Date	Note	Diameter	Founder	long measure	lb	kg
Treble	1706	Eb	27.50 in (69.9 cm)	Henry Pleasant	4 long cwt 2 qr	500	230
2nd	1630	Db	28.38 in (72.1 cm)	Miles I Graye	4 long cwt 3 qr	530	240
3rd	1706	C	30.31 in (77.0 cm)	Henry Pleasant	5 long cwt 1 qr	590	270
4th	1706	Bb	34.63 in (88.0 cm)	Henry Pleasant	7 long cwt 1 qr	810	370
Tenor	1706	Ab	39.38 in (100.0 cm)	Henry Pleasant	10 long cwt	1,100	500

== Notable people buried in St Nicholas' graveyard ==
- Peyton Ventris (1645 – 1691), judge and politician.
