= Akenfield =

1974 film

- Directed by: Peter Hall
- Screenplay by: Ronald Blythe
- Based on: Akenfield: Portrait of an English Village by Ronald Blythe
- Produced by: Peter Hall; Rex Pyke
- Cinematography: Ivan Strasberg
- Edited by: Rex Pyke
- Music by: Michael Tippett
- Production company: Angle Films
- Distributed by: Angle Films
- Release dates: 18 November 1974 (London Film Festival); 26 January 1976
- Running time: 95 minutes
- Country: United Kingdom
- Language: English
- Budget: £120,094
- Box office: £931

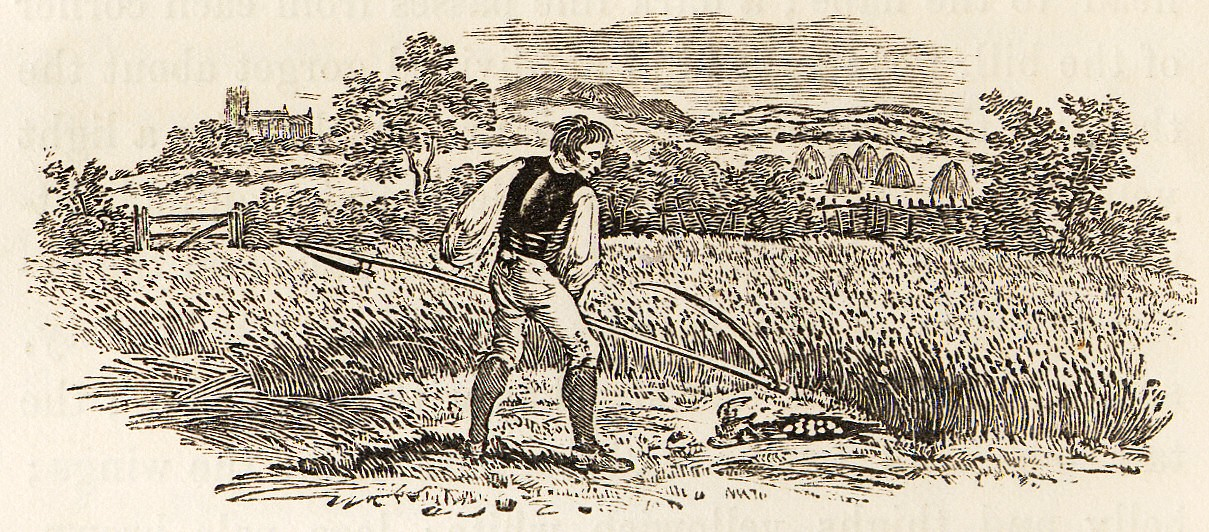
Peter Hall's film Akenfield made use of a scene depicted in Thomas Bewick's 1797 A History of British Birds: a reaper finds he has just killed a partridge sitting on her nest.

Akenfield is a 1974 British film directed by Peter Hall in 1974, based loosely upon the book Akenfield: Portrait of an English Village by Ronald Blythe (1969). Blythe has a cameo role as the vicar and all other parts are played by real-life villagers who improvised their own dialogue; there are no professional actors in the piece. Blythe's book is the distillation of interviews with 49 local people, maintaining privacy with false names and sometimes amalgamating two people in one. Blythe once referred to his book as a work of poetry. The film is a work of fiction, based on an 18-page story synopsis by Blythe.

== Plot ==
The central character Tom is a young man living in a cottage with his widowed mother in the 1970s, in a Suffolk village (the fictitious Akenfield). The film depicts the few days surrounding the funeral of Tom's grandfather, who was born and grew up in the village in the early 1900s, experienced much poverty and hard work, fought in the First World War (when he lost most of his comrades), returned, made a failed attempt to escape the village by walking to Newmarket for a job, took a wife in the village and lived in a tied cottage on the farmer's estate for the rest of his life. His son, Tom's father, was killed in the Second World War, and Tom has grown up hearing all sorts of stories from his grandfather. Everyone around him says what a good old boy his grandfather was, and remember the old days, but all Tom can hear is the words of his grandfather ringing in his ears. Now in 1974 he is making his own plans to get away, with or without his teacher girlfriend. The cycle goes round and round with the menace of poverty and entrapment grinning through the veil of rural beauty. Will Tom be defeated by the land and the hard work, just as his grandfather was?

== Cast ==
- Garrow Shand as Tom Rouse
- Peggy Cole as Dulcie Rouse
- Barbara Tilney as Jean Quantrill
- Lyn Brooks as Charlotte Rouse
- Ida Page as Aunt Ida
- Molly Dedman as Molly
- Ted Dedman as Ted
- Lucy Dedman as Lucy
- Charlie Cornish as Charlie
- Charlie Whiting as Charlie
- Robin Buckingham as Robin
- Alan Wright
- Mary Hammond as young Dulcie Rouse
- Ronald Blythe as vicar
- F.O. Staddon as minister
- Bob Wilson as farmer
- Ethel Branton as Mrs. Quantrill
- Stanley Baxter as blacksmith
- Reg Hall as village policeman

== Background ==
The preliminaries to filming were protracted, and Blythe had many reservations about the difficulties in making a film showing "three generations in terms of work, belief, education and climate. For this is what Akenfield is really concerned with".

'Akenfield' is a made-up placename based partly upon Akenham (a small village just north of Ipswich, the county town of Suffolk) and probably partly on Charsfield, a village just outside the small town of Wickham Market, about ten miles north-east of Akenham. The film of Akenfield was made on location in the villages just west of Wickham Market, notably Hoo, Debach, Charsfield, Monewden, Dallinghoo, Letheringham, Burgh and Pettistree.

The actors in the film were non-professional, drawn from the local population, and therefore speak with authentic accents and play their parts in a manner unaffected by the habit of stage or screen performance. After making the film, most returned to usual rural occupations. Garrod Shand plays all three generations, grandfather, father and son. The voice of old Tom was by Peter Tuddenham. Most of the filming was done at weekends, when the cast was available, and shooting took almost a year – following the changing seasons in the process. The director's father, Reg Hall, a station master born in Bury St Edmunds, appears briefly as the village policeman walking down a lane with a bicycle.

Ronald Blythe's book Akenfield is a gritty work of hard scholarship, rooted in detailed statistical data, presenting a very realistic grounded understanding of the economic and social life of a village. Life in Blythe's written Akenfield is less anecdotal than, for instance, John Moore's Brensham or Elmbury. The film is a translation of this scholarly view into a portrait of a rural community told through the eyes of one of its members. In seeing through his eyes, we also see through the eyes of his ancestors.

Blythe had spent the winter of 1966–7 listening to three generations of his Suffolk neighbours in the villages of Charsfield and Debach, recording their views on education, class, welfare, religion, farming and also death. Published in 1969, the book painted a picture of country living at a time of change – its stories told in the voices of the farmers and villagers themselves. Such was its power that Akenfield was translated into more than 20 languages. It became required reading in American and Canadian high schools and universities. In 1999 Penguin re-published it as a Twentieth-Century Classic, which helped bring it to a new audience of readers.

In discussions prior to filming Blythe and Hall talked about Robert Bresson's films of French rural life and Man of Aran. One of the major challenges of the filming was to recreate the sense of a rural economy based around horses; Blythe considered one of the best scenes the evocation of a harvest around 1911, complete with "Suffolk waggons, the biggest in England, and heroic punches to draw them".

The music was intended to be written by Benjamin Britten, himself a Suffolk man, but he suffered a heart attack and was unable to work. Instead, Hall chose Michael Tippett, a friend and colleague whose childhood home was in Suffolk – they had worked together at London's Royal Opera House, where Hall had recently produced Tippett's 1970 opera The Knot Garden. Tippett's Fantasia Concertante on a Theme of Corelli plays a major role in the emotional timbre of the film.

== Release ==
The film had its premiere as the opening night film of the London Film Festival on 18 November 1974. It opened on 26 January 1976 at the Paris Pullman Cinema in London and was also shown on television in the UK on the same date.

== Reception ==
Variety called it "a parochial drama-documentary" but "otherwise an impressive achievement as a portrait of a rural Suffolk county". When the film was screened on UK television it attracted fifteen million viewers.

== Literary environment ==
- For East Anglian folklore, perhaps in such scenes as 'Hollering largesse', there is an allusion to the work of John Glyde Jnr in The New Suffolk Garland.
- Past and present, and the experiences of successive generations, merge in the way suggested by T. S. Eliot in East Coker, in a recurrence through cameos and flashbacks.
- A courtship scene in which the future bride steals the clothes of a young man while he is swimming in the river, and is then chased by him naked across the fields, is borrowed from H. E. Bates' Uncle Silas story The Revelation (My Uncle Silas, 1939).
- A scene in which the grandfather as a young man is reaping, and weeps when he accidentally crushes a bird's egg, is derived from a Thomas Bewick tail-piece (pictured) in his History of British Birds. This is a homage to the oral historian George Ewart Evans of Blaxhall, a village near to Charsfield, who used the Bewick image on the title page of his first Blaxhall study Ask the Fellows Who Cut The Hay (Faber and Faber, London 1956).

== Legacy ==
The technique used in the film is somewhat echoed in the pioneering verbatim theatre style developed in London Road at the National Theatre in 2011.
