= Ipswich Historic Churches Trust =

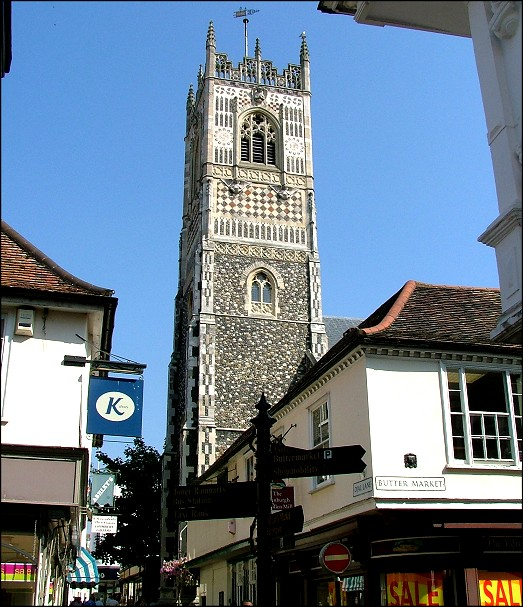
St Lawrence Church, Ipswich, one of the churches maintained by the Ipswich Historic Churches Trust.

The Ipswich Historic Churches Trust is a charitable trust set up to preserve redundant mediaeval churches of historical and architectural value in Ipswich in the county of Suffolk, England.

== Churches ==
Established in 1979, the trust currently maintains five churches, which are used for a variety of purposes:

- St Lawrence Church, housing the oldest ring of bells (now a restaurant)
- St Clement's Church, formerly a mariners' church (now home to Ipswich Arts Centre)
- St Peter's Church, housing a Tournai font (now a heritage centre and music venue)
- St Nicholas' Church, where Cardinal Wolsey worshipped as a child (for many years a conference centre for the Diocese of St Edmundsbury and Ipswich)
- St Stephen's Church, Ipswich, the town's smallest mediaeval church (currently vacant, but for many years a tourist information centre)

The local historian and former headmaster of Ipswich School, John Blatchly, was chairman of the trust from 1994 until his death in 2015 and led much of the conservation and repair work.
