= Akenfield: Portrait of an English Village =

1969 book by Ronald Blythe

- Author: Ronald Blythe
- Language: English
- Subject: Rural life in Suffolk
- Genre: Oral history
- Published: 1969
- Publisher: Viking
- Pages: 288
- ISBN: 978-0713901009

Akenfield: Portrait of an English Village is a 1969 book by Ronald Blythe. It is an oral-history and documentary-style portrait of rural life in Suffolk, England.

Blythe created the book from the reminiscences of local people in his home area of Suffolk, mostly recorded in 1967. Akenfield, the village in the title, is fictional, but the name is taken from those of two local villages, Akenham and Charsfield.

The book covers the period from the beginning of the 20th century to the late 1960s, and illustrates changes in the lives of working-class rural people over those decades. Although based on factual material, it is fictionalised and has come to be regarded as a classic; it became the book for which Blythe was best known. It was the basis for the 1974 film Akenfield, directed by Peter Hall.
