= High House Meadows, Monewden =

Protected area in Suffolk, England

Coordinates: 52.176°N 1.254°E

- Site of Special Scientific Interest
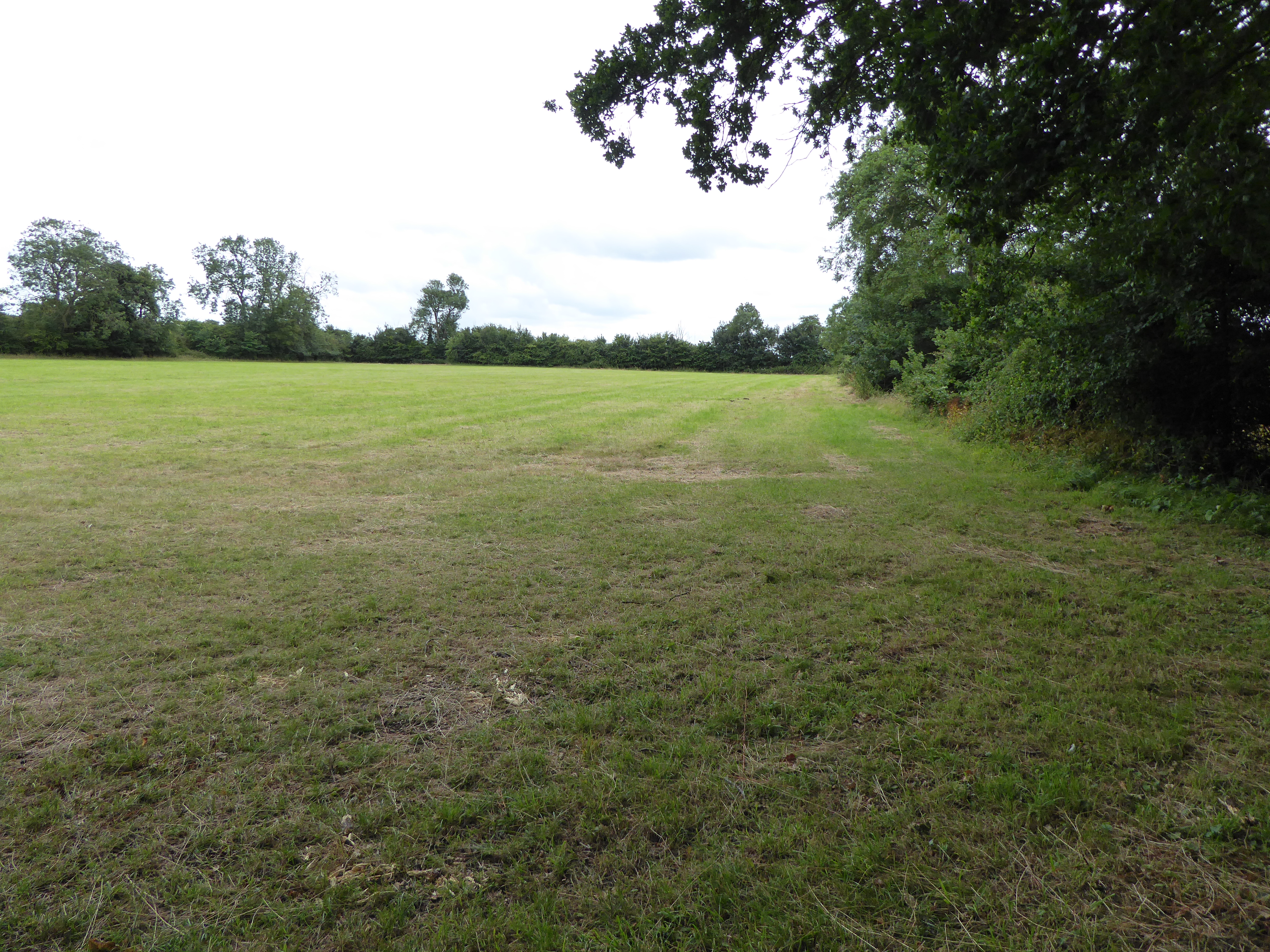
- Location of High House Meadows, Monewden.
- Area of search: Suffolk
- Grid reference: TM 226 581
- Interest: Biological
- Area: 3.0 hectares
- Notification date: 1991
- Location map: Magic Map

High House Meadows, Monewden is a three hectare biological Site of Special Scientific Interest west of Monewden in Suffolk.

These unimproved meadows have diverse herbs typical of clay pastures. There are scarce species such as autumn crocus, green-winged orchid, sulphur clover and adders-tongue fern.

The site is private land with no public access.
