= Letheringham Priory =

Priory in Suffolk, England

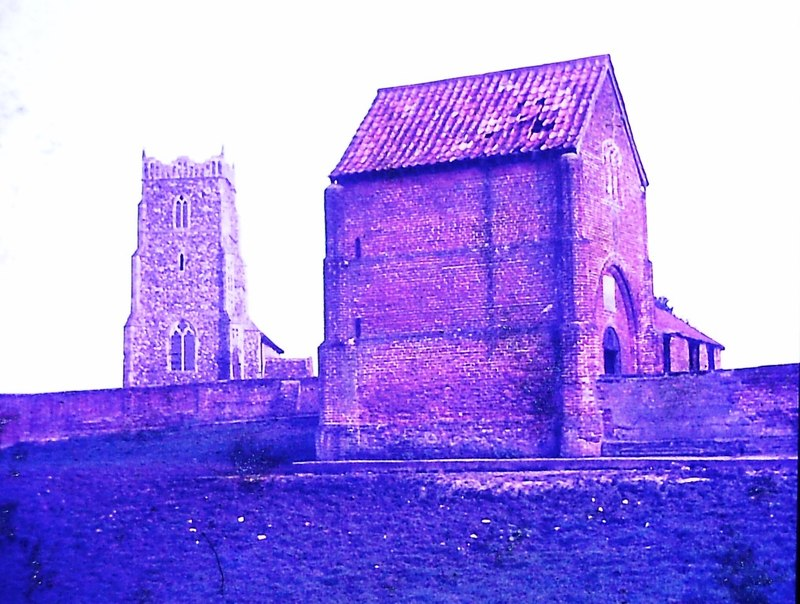
Ecclesiastical Letheringham

Letheringham Priory was a small outlying cell of the Augustinian Priory of St Peter and St Paul in Ipswich (England) that was founded at the end of the 12th century in the nearby Suffolk village of Letheringham. It was itself dedicated to the Blessed Virgin, and occupied by 3 or 4 canons under a prior. It was initially under the patronage of the de Bovile family, the local Lords of the Manor. Records of the Taxatio Ecclesiastica in 1291, show this priory had an annual income of 12 pounds 11 shillings, derived from local lands in Letheringham plus those belonging to the church in the neighbouring village of Charsfield.

In the mid-14th century the patronage passed to Margery, daughter and heiress of Sir John Bovile, and then to her second husband, Thomas Wingfield. Thereafter, the patronage continued under the Wingfield name for some two centuries. By the time of the last prior, William Basse, and just before the Priory's suppression as part of the Dissolution of the Monasteries, the yearly income was valued at 26 pounds 18 shillings and 5 pence. Subsequently, the property was granted in 1539 to Sir Anthony Wingfield, its recent patron and the Lord of the Manor. Fire damaged all the buildings, excepting the church, in the early 1600s, resulting in Sir Robert Naunton (great-grandson of Sir Anthony) having a large mansion, Letheringham Abbey, built on the site to the south of the monastic church.

Through vandalism and neglect the church was in serious disrepair by the late 1700s. In 1789 the church authorities directed the parish to repair the church. However, the churchwardens arranged only for the nave to be restored, having its east end closed up (thus creating substantially the church that exists today). By way of recompense, the contractors were allowed to pull down the chancel and dispose of it and its monuments as they wished, the latter being crushed for use as road ballast.

Despite these misfortunes, extensive records have survived that provide evidence of the past splendours. John Blatchly in his 1974 article comments that this "sadly mutilated fragment of a former priory church ... has been visited so regularly during the last four hundred years by collectors of church notes that the decay of the building and the monuments it housed has been unusually well documented.". The records of these visits, including within them a number of drawings, give a clear indication of the impressive monuments in "stone, brass and glass" largely relating to the Bovile, Wingfield and Naunton families. Thomas Martin, who visited twice in 1723 and 1744, states "I have neither seen, nor Read of any place (except Westminster Abbey) so fully adorn'd with such Noble Remains of Antiquity". Horace Walpole in 1755 exclaims "The Church, which is scarce bigger than a large chapel, is very ruinous, though containing such treasures!".

It remains today a site of both historical and archaeological interest, consisting of:

- a brick gatehouse, late 15th and early 16th cent, with two storeys (Grade II listed).
- parts of the nave of the monastic church, and a medieval (14th cent) tower, now incorporated into the present parish church of St Mary.
- buried remains of the other priory buildings.
- walls, in part ancient, related to the garden of the 17th century mansion.

== Burials ==
- Robert Wingfield
- Anthony Wingfield
