= Martins' Meadows =

Nature reserve in Suffolk, England

Coordinates: 52.167°N 1.256°E

Monewden Meadows
- Site of Special Scientific Interest
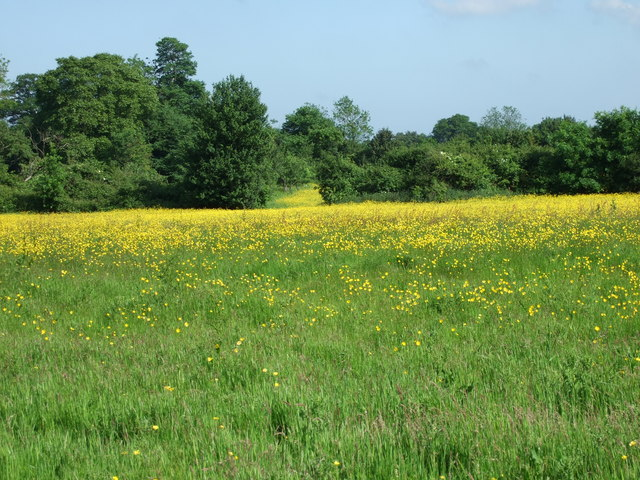
- Location of Monewden Meadows.
- Area of search: Suffolk
- Grid reference: TM 227 571
- Interest: Biological
- Area: 3.7 hectares
- Notification date: 1983
- Location map: Magic Map

Monewden Meadows is a 3.7-hectare (9.1-acre) biological Site of Special Scientific Interest south-west of Monewden in Suffolk. It is a Nature Conservation Review site, Grade I, and it is managed by the Suffolk Wildlife Trust under the name Martins' Meadows.

The site consists of three unimproved fields described as a "species-rich lowland meadow" classified as type MG5. It is described as the best remaining area of clay or neutral lowland meadow remaining in Suffolk. Floral species include snake's-head fritillary (Fritillaria meleagris), early purple orchid (Orchis mascula), green-winged orchid (Anacamptis morio), pyramidal orchid (Anacamptis pyramidalis), common twayblade (Listera ovata), meadow saffron (Colchicum autumnale), adder's-tongue fern (Ophioglossum vulgatum), pepper saxifrage (Silaum silaus) and rim lichen (Lecanora pulicaris). Notable fauna includes great-crested newt (Triturus cristatus) and barn owl (Tyto alba).

There is access from the road between Monewden and Clopton.

== See also ==
- List of Sites of Special Scientific Interest in Suffolk
- Suffolk Wildlife Trust
