= Wolsey's Gate =

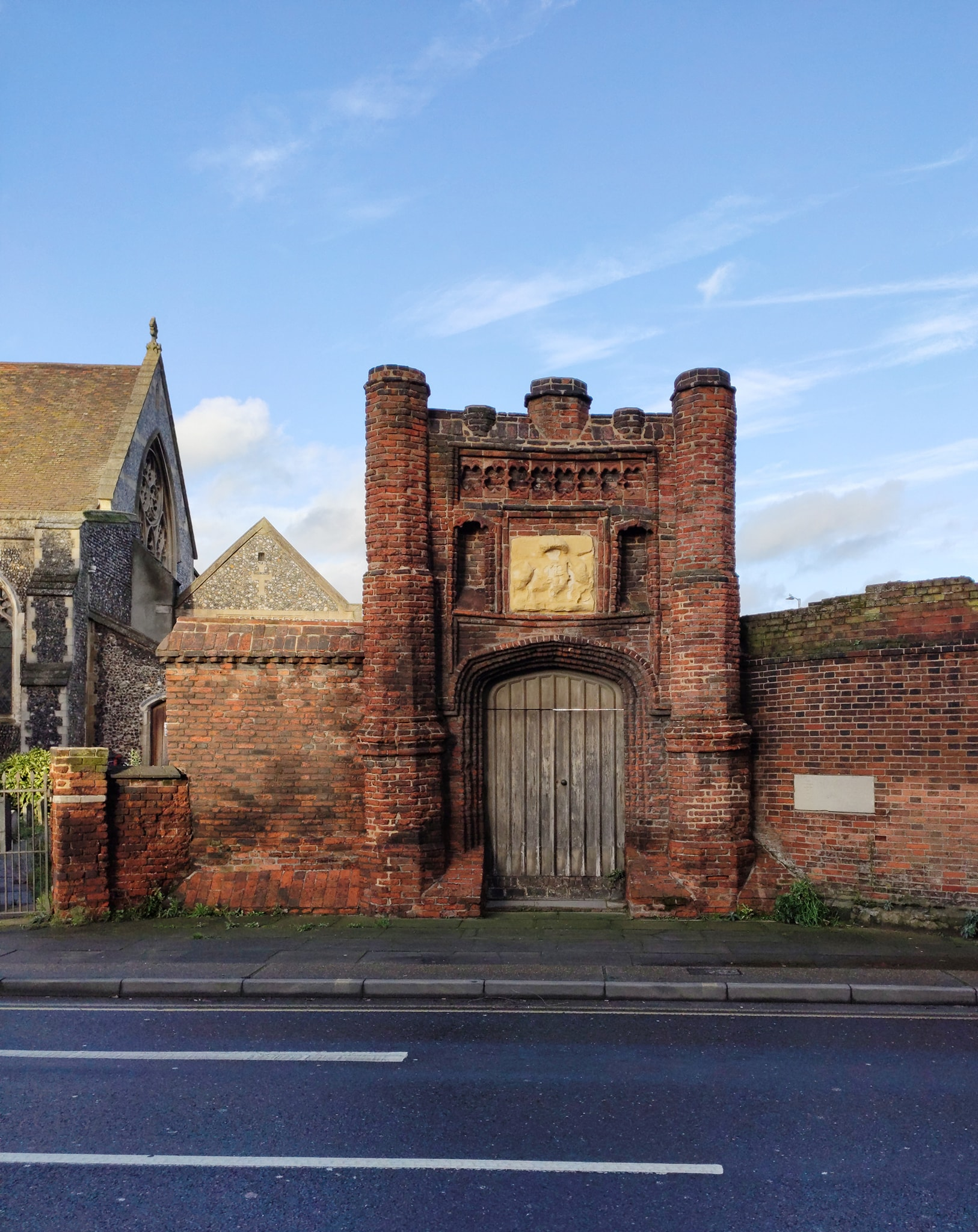
- Wolsey's Gate (2020)

- Location within Suffolk
- 52.0530889170549°N 1.1545726414436°E
- Location: College Street, Ipswich, Suffolk

History
- Built: 1528
- Built for: Cardinal College of St. Mary, Ipswich

Wolsey's Gate, also called Wolsey Gate, is an English gatehouse in Ipswich, Suffolk. It was built in 1528 in the Tudor style, and was intended to be the water gate for an educational college created in the mould of Winchester and Eton colleges.

The gateway consists of two short sections of brick wall supporting a pair of turrets, joined by a horizontal lintel, decorated with brickwork in the style of blind arcades. Under the lintel and flanked by niches is a very worn coat of arms in white stone.

== History ==
Cardinal Wolsey, an eminent statesman born in Ipswich, decided to found colleges in every diocese in England. These colleges were intended to feed a new college at the University of Oxford: Cardinal College.

Chief amongst these new collegiate foundations would be a grand college in his hometown: the Cardinal College of St. Mary, Ipswich. The Ipswich foundation was the only one whose construction had begun, due to Wolsey's fall from power in 1529.

Wolsey's Gate, being the water gate, is the sole remnant of this college.

=== The Fall of the College ===
Due to the lack of a resolution to the King's Great Matter, the influence of Wolsey was greatly lessened in England by Henry VIII. Assets of the Cardinal were stolen by the King, including many of the building materials intended for use in Cardinal College:

"Timber, lead, wainscot and white stone of divers kind’ that remained in Ipswich, waiting to be used for the construction of the college, were packed up and taken by sea from Ipswich to the Galley Key by London Tower, ‘to be used for the king’s buildings at Westminster' "

However, as the water gate had already been constructed, its materials were not seized for other projects.

=== Neglect ===
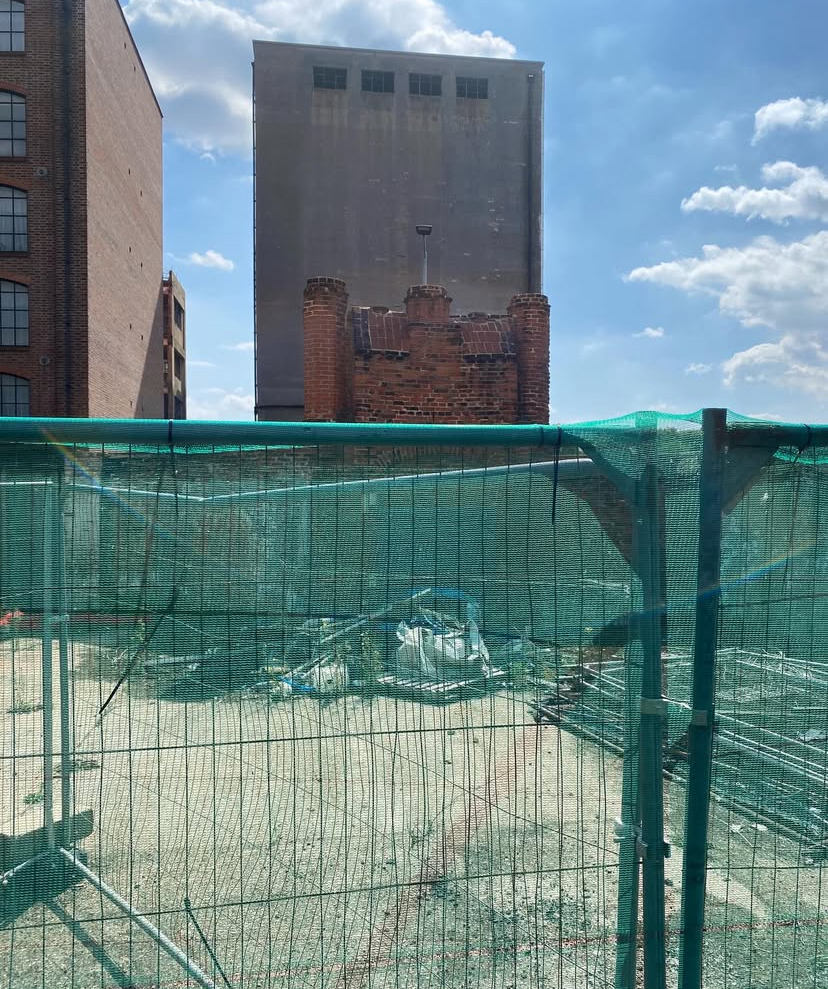
Wolsey's Gate reverse (2025)

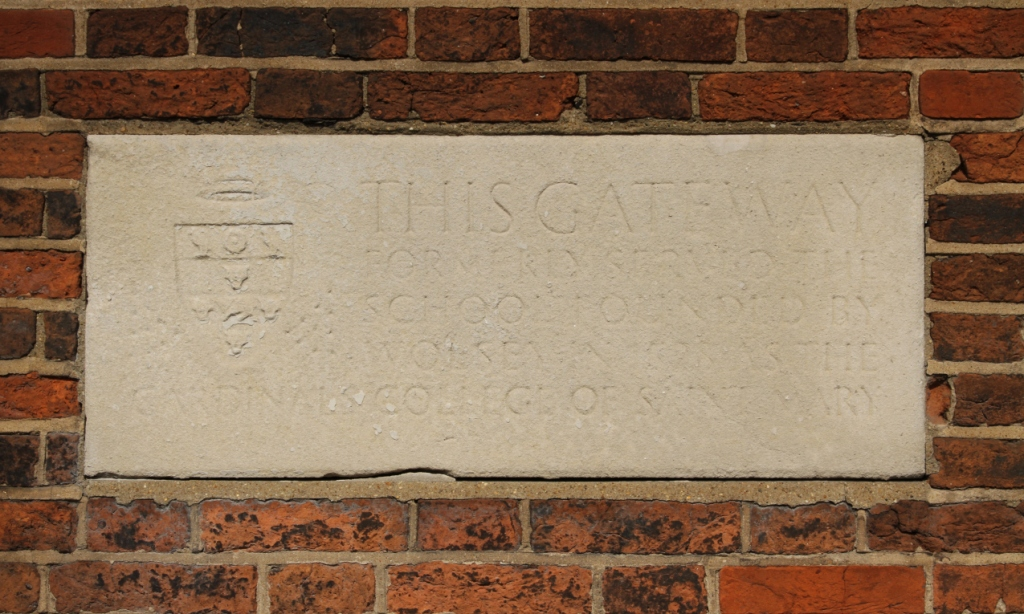
Stone plaque next to the surviving gateway of the former Cardinal College of St Mary, College Street, Ipswich, Suffolk

All property pertaining to the original site of the college, including Wolsey's Gate, was granted to Thomas Alvard. However, according to contemporary accounts, the site was not maintained to any standard:

"The very site of the Cardinal's College becomes in a brief space of time a spot for depositing of the refuse and filth of the town."

Though much of the original site of the college has been developed, including the construction of the Cattle Market Bus Station, the site of the gate itself remains under private ownership. As of 2025, the site by College Street in Ipswich has been converted into a car park. The immediate area around the gate has been cordoned by temporary metal fencing. Moreover, the other side of Wolsey's Gate is equally inaccessible: it is cut off by a busy lane of traffic on College Street. This has also arguably caused extensive damage to the Gate:

“As a listed building, the Gate is reasonably well-looked after although it suffers from the effects of the passing traffic, and in the past it has been covered in ivy and suffered from buddleia growing from on top. People have suggested that it should be moved to a less busy location, but this misses its main purpose, as an entrance to Wolsey's College on the other side of the gate. A much better option would be to move the traffic, as passing traffic is the primary cause of the deterioration of the brickwork, primarily vibrations from the road, and salt spread on the road, mixed with water and splashed onto the adjoining buildings.”

== Contemporary status ==
=== Ipswich School ===
As Ipswich School claims succession from Cardinal College of St Mary, it borrowed design elements from the original foundation as part of the design of its purpose-built facilities in 1852. This includes its main entrance, which Christopher Fleury modelled after the full realisation of Wolsey's Gate.

=== Ipswich Town Football Club ===
The crest for Ipswich Town dating from its first iteration in 1972 was, according to its designer John Gammage, inspired by Wolsey's Gate:

"I regarded the Suffolk Punch as a noble animal, well suited to dominate our design and represent the club. And to complete the badge I thought of the town of Ipswich which contains many historical buildings, including the Wolsey Gate, and is close to the sea with a large dock area."

=== 2012 vandalism ===
In 2012, Wolsey's Gate was vandalised by graffiti. The graffiti extended beyond the wooden panelling put in place on the reverse, and onto the Tudor brickwork itself.

=== SPILL Festival ===
As part of the biennial Spill Festival, the artist Olivier Grossetête designed a replica of Wolsey's Gate in cardboard in 2023. This was part of the artist's wider Monumental Constructions project.

The monument was then pulled down at the end of the 2023 Spill Festival by Ipswich residents.

=== Guild of Our Lady of Grace of Ipswich ===
Every September, the Guild of Our Lady of Grace of Ipswich organises a local pilgrimage across Ipswich to commemorate sites associated with Mary, mother of Jesus. The starting point of this route is Wolsey's Gate, owing to the intended patronage of Cardinal College.

== Gallery ==
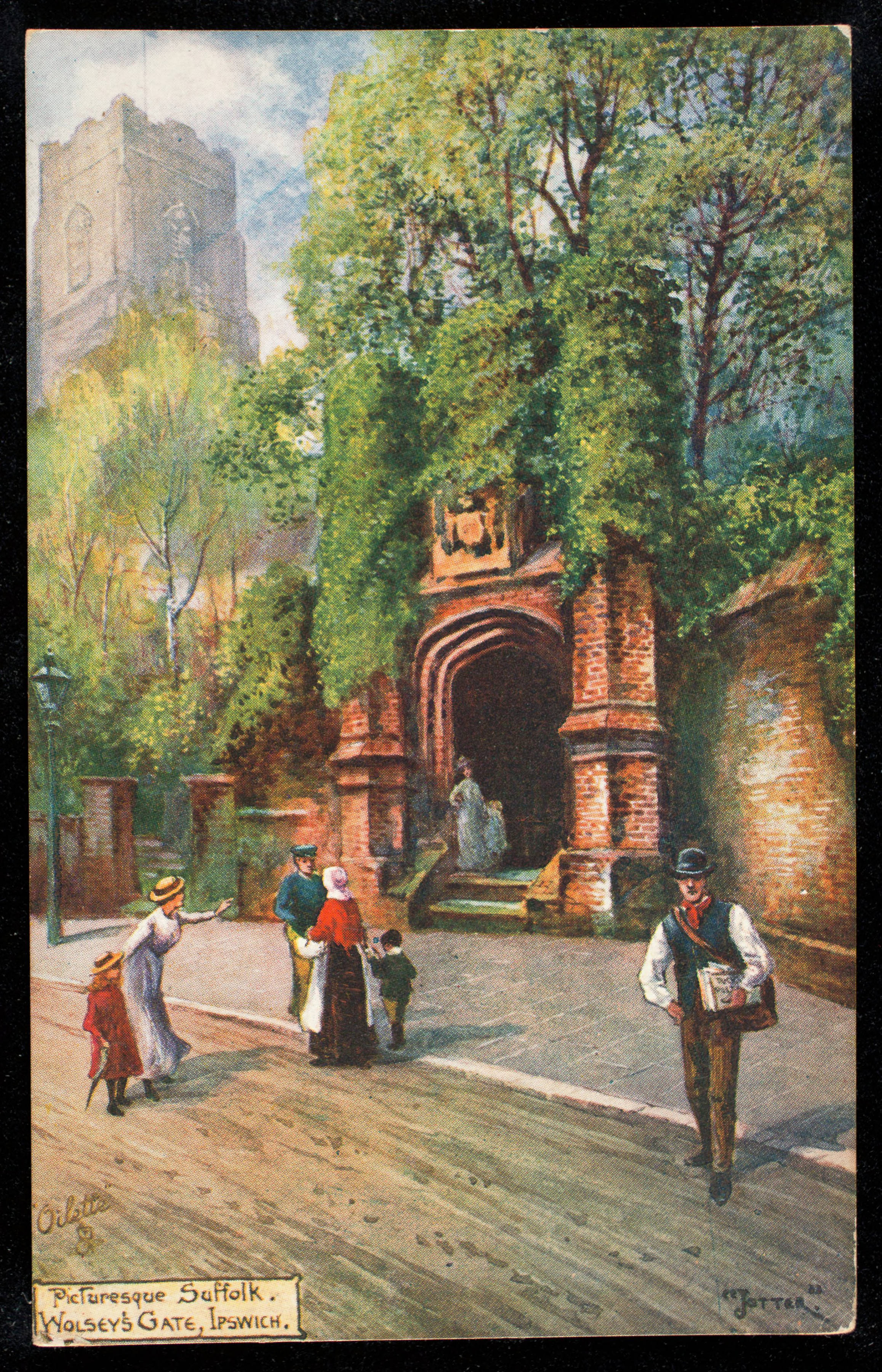

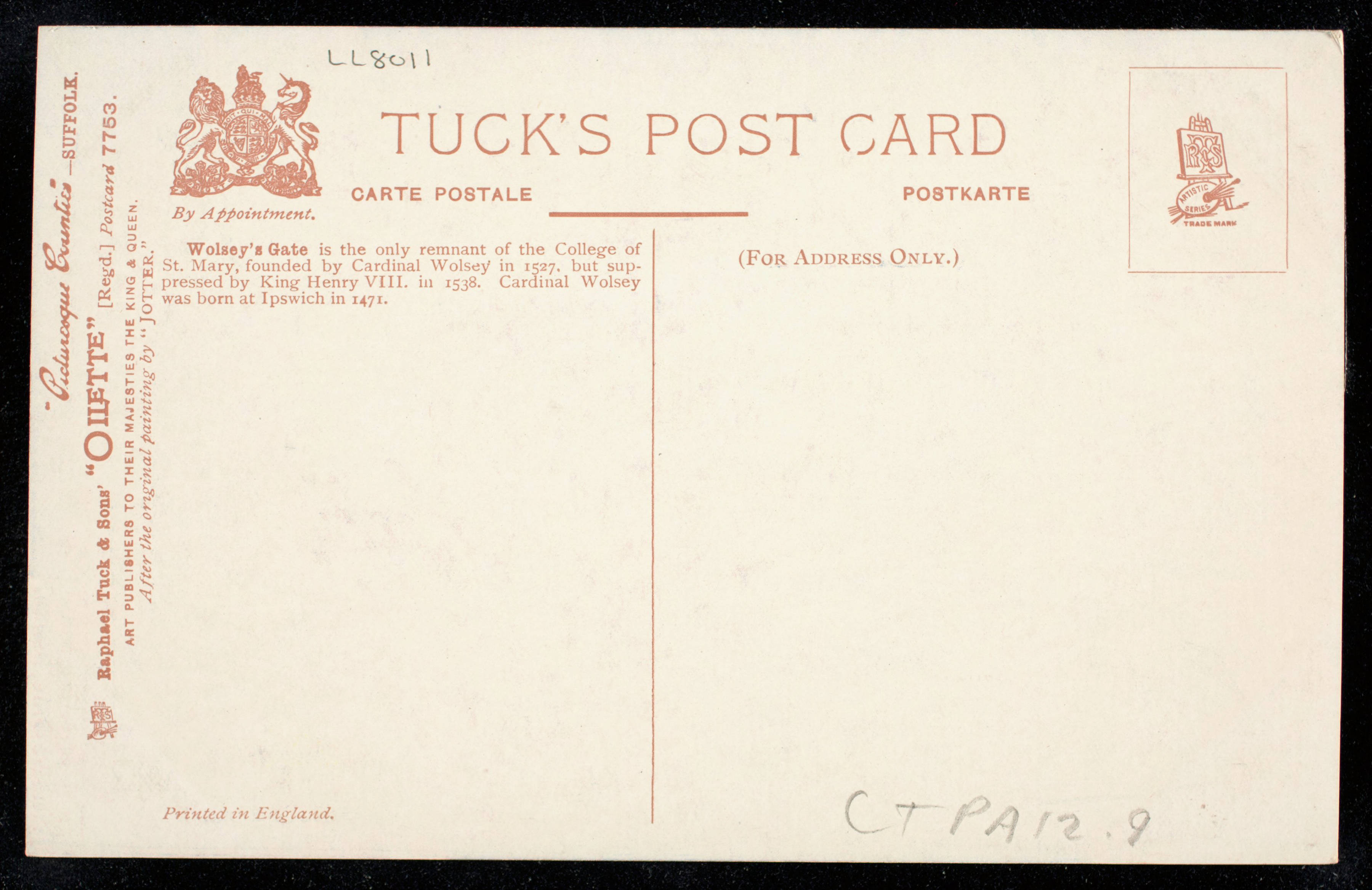

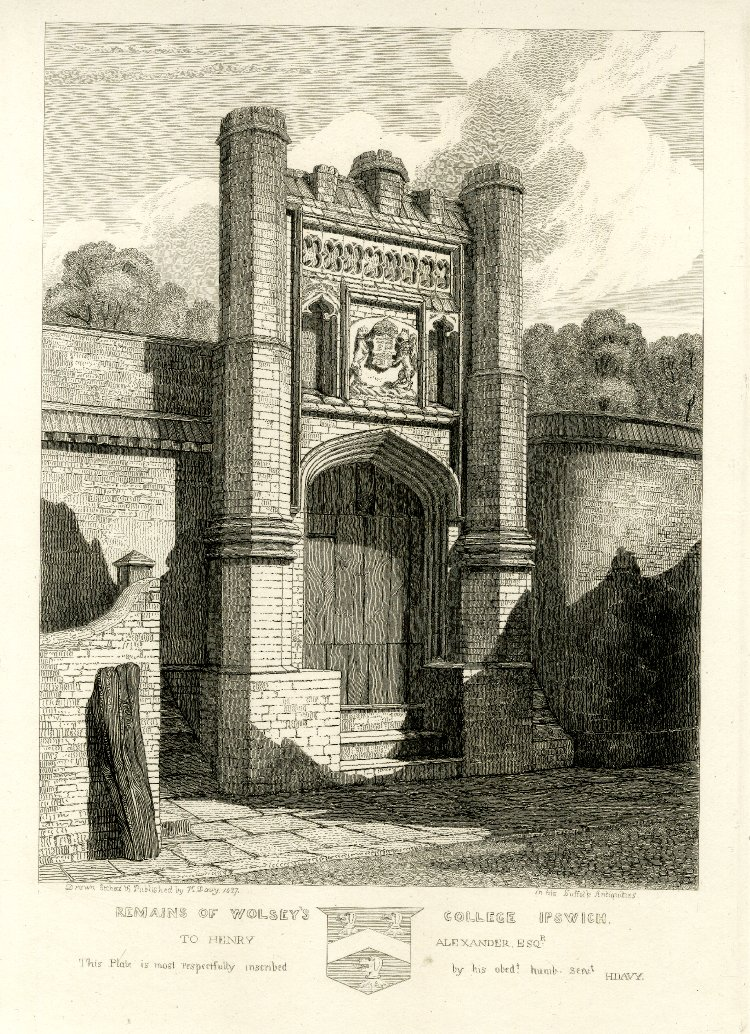

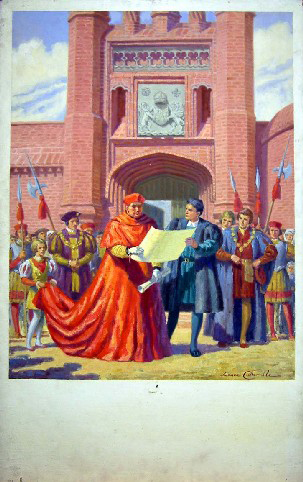

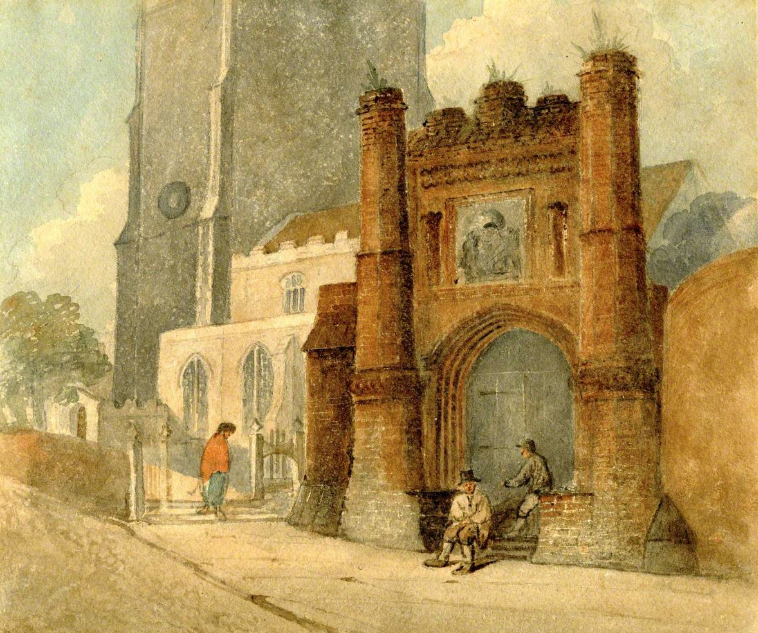

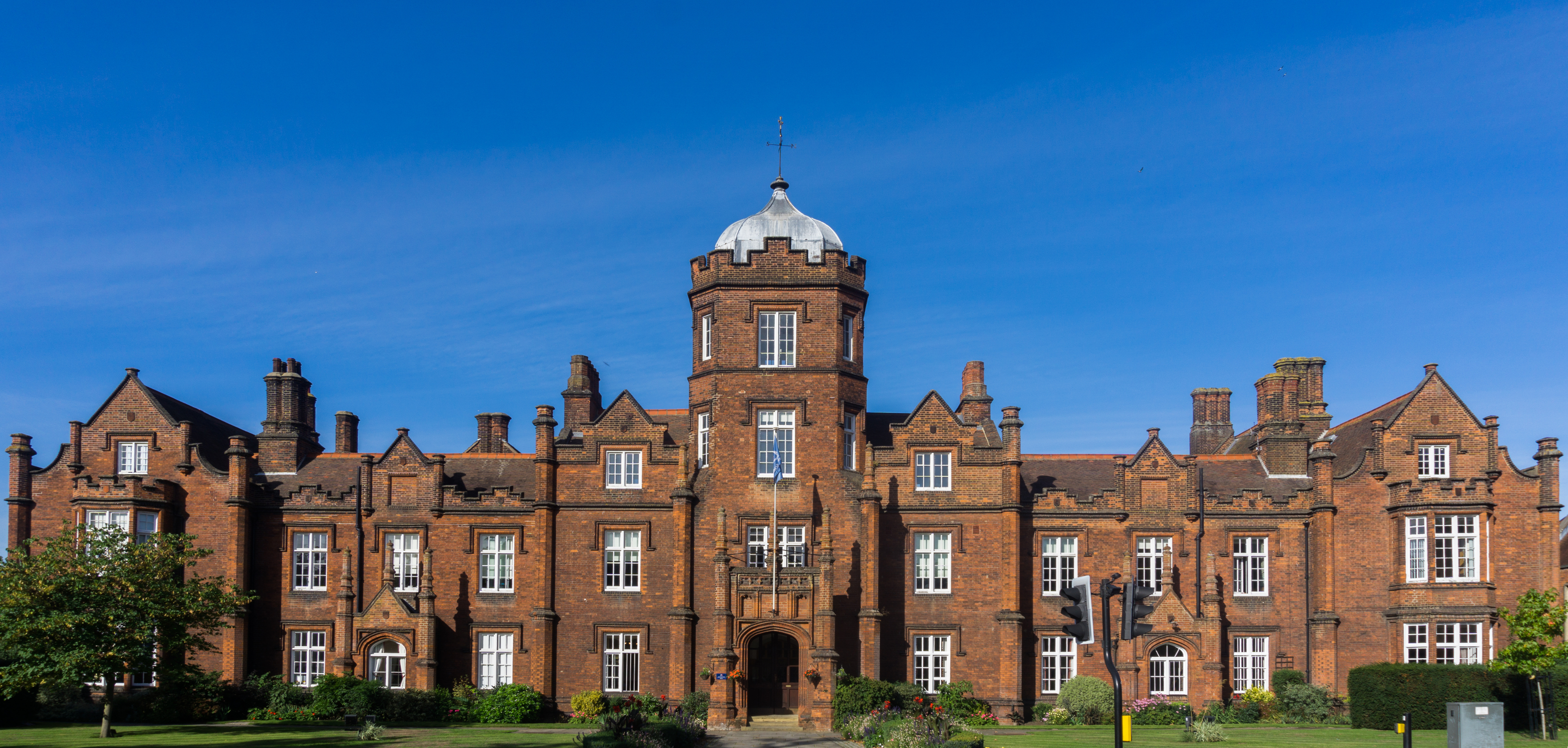

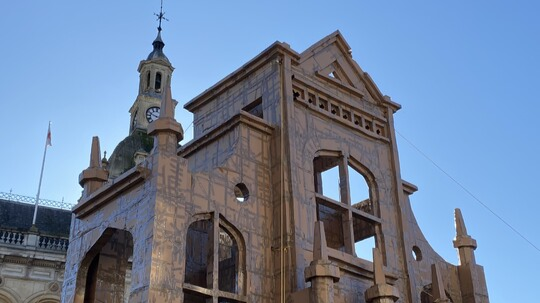
