= St Peter's Church, Ipswich =

Coordinates: 52.0532°N 1.1542°E

- St Peter's by the Waterfront, Ipswich
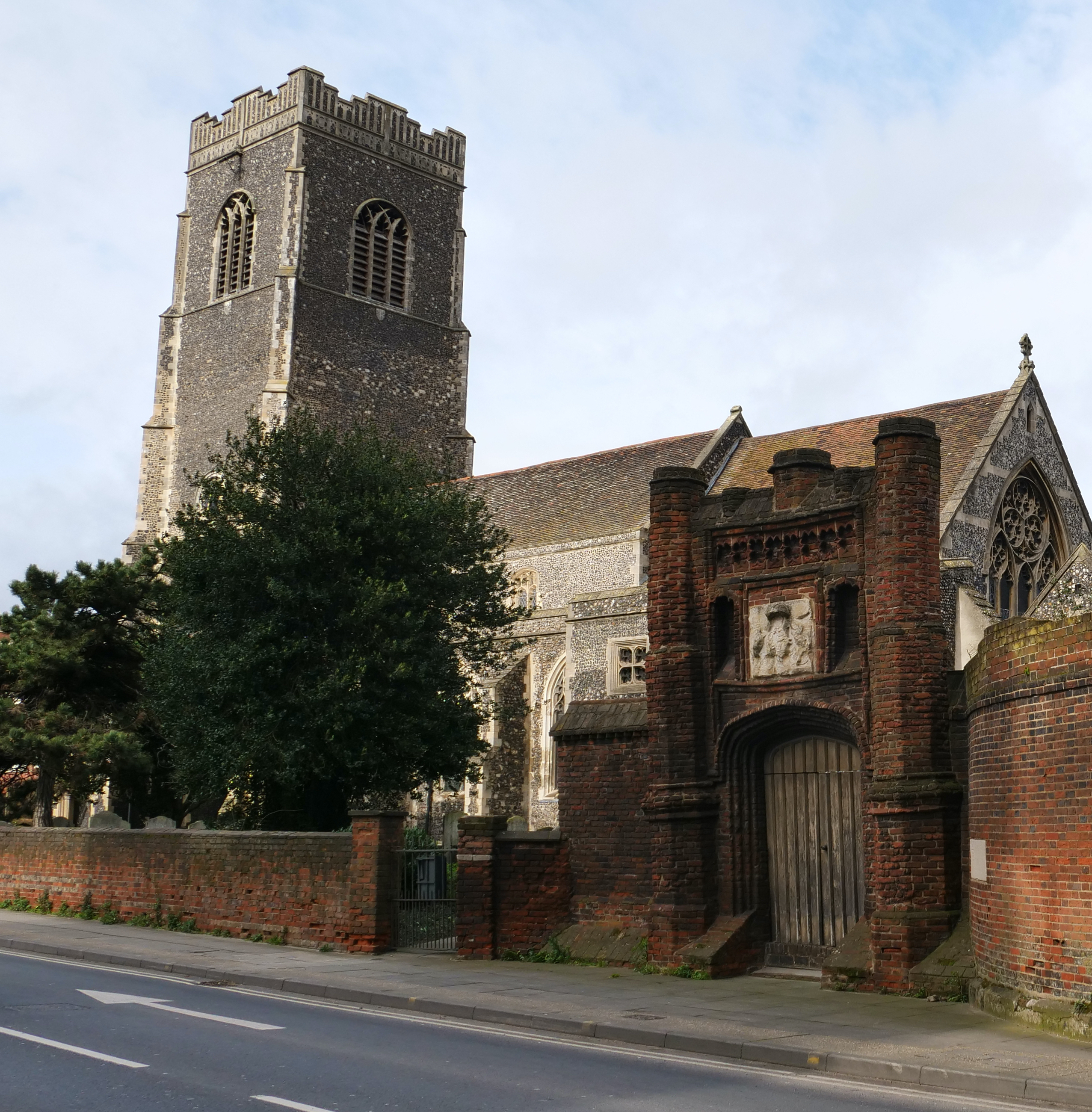
- St Peter's Church with Wolsey's Gate

- Location in Suffolk
- OS grid reference: TM 166 441
- Location: Ipswich, Suffolk
- Country: England
- Denomination: Anglican
- Website: St Peter's by the Waterfront

Architecture
- Functional status: Redundant
- Heritage designation: Grade II*
- Designated: 19 December 1951
- Architectural type: Church
- Style: Perpendicular Gothic

Specifications
- Materials: Flint with stone dressings

St Peter's Church (also known as St Peter's by the Waterfront) is one of the twelve medieval churches in the ancient borough of Ipswich, England. An Augustinian priory dedicated to St Peter and Paul occupied a six-acre site to the north and east of the church. As the secular canons regularly used the chancel for religious purposes, leaving the nave for use of parishioners, the church was also known as St Peter and Paul's. The church is located between College Street and Star Lane, with St Peters Street leading north into Ipswich town centre.

== History ==
The location is probably that of the earliest church building in Ipswich, there being a St Peter's church mentioned in Domesday Book. The church was located just north of a ford by which visitors arriving in Ipswich could cross the River Orwell. On 8 January 1297, Edward I married his youngest daughter Elizabeth of Rhuddlan to John I, Count of Holland in this earlier church. The existing structure was built in 1460 and contains a Tournai font, which dates from c. 1170–90.

== Heritage centre ==
The building was restored with a Heritage Lottery grant in 2006. The Ipswich Hospital Band received £772,000. The building was reopened in 2008 as a heritage centre and is maintained by the Ipswich Historic Churches Trust.
