= Letheringham =

Civil parish in Suffolk, England

Coordinates: 52.172247°N 1.324282°E

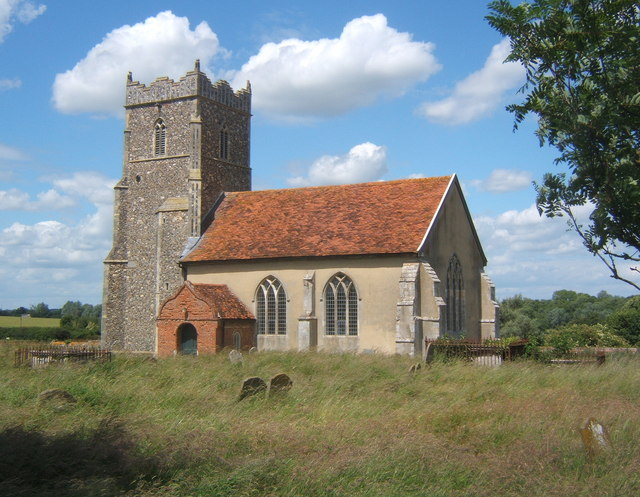
- St Mary's Church, Letheringham

- Location within Suffolk
- Area: 9.52 km^{2} (3.68 sq mi) inc the parish of Hoo, Suffolk
- Population: 160 (2011) inc the parish of Hoo, Suffolk
  - Density: 17/km^{2} (44/sq mi)
- District: East Suffolk
- Shire county: Suffolk
- Region: East
- Country: England
- Sovereign state: United Kingdom
- Post town: Woodbridge
- Postcode district: IP13
- Police: Suffolk
- Fire: Suffolk
- Ambulance: East of England
- UK Parliament: Central Suffolk and North Ipswich

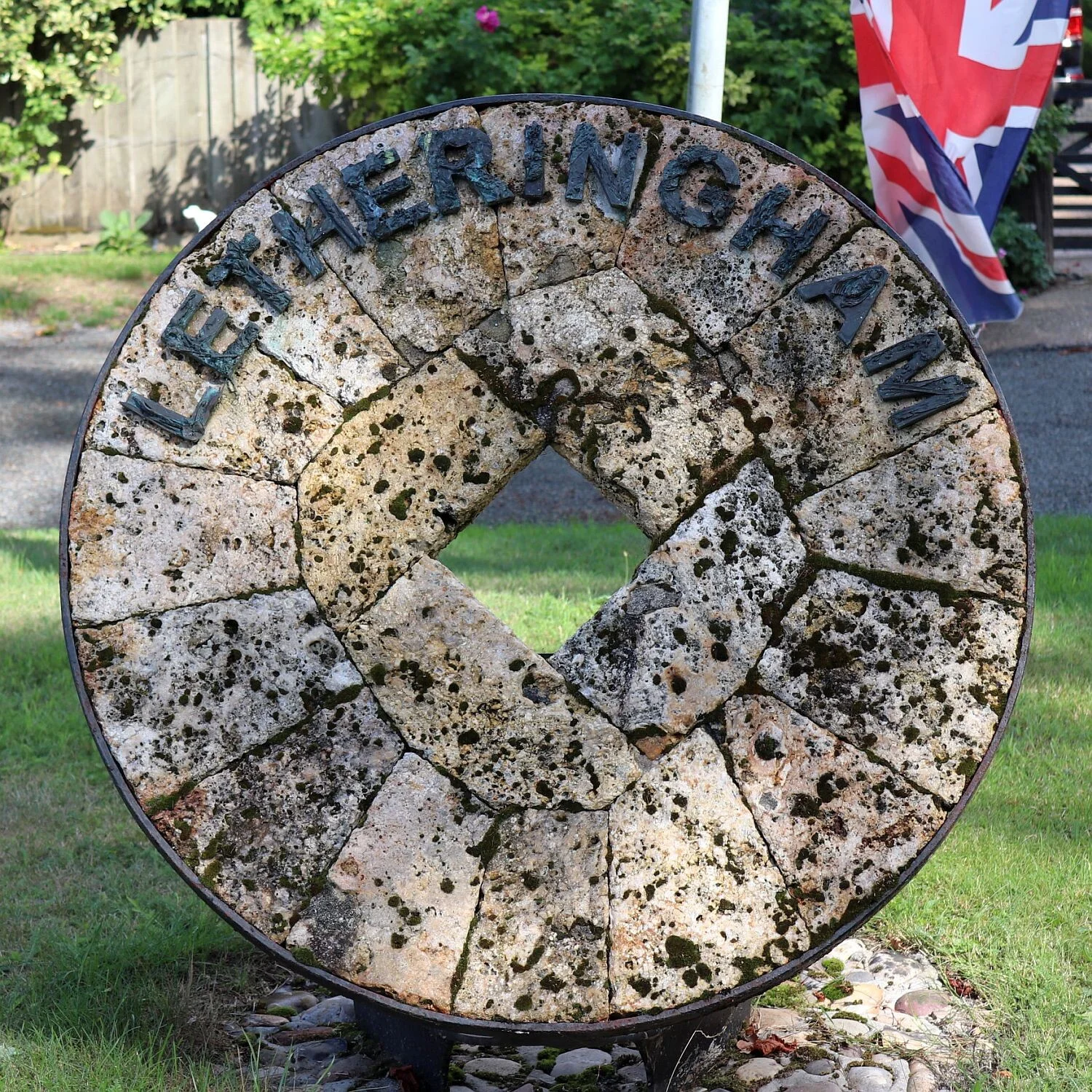
Letheringham village sign, a millstone from the old watermill

Letheringham is a sparsely populated civil parish in the East Suffolk district (formerly Deben Rural District and then Suffolk Coastal) in Suffolk, England, on the Deben River.

St Mary is a tiny church, the remains of the tower and nave of a Priory church, and sits in a farmyard.

For over 1000 years Letheringham has been a parish of ancient Loes Hundred.

From the 2011 Census population details were no longer maintained for this parish and were included in the civil parish of Hoo.

== History ==
=== Domesday Book ===
Letheringham was recorded here in 1086 as a settlement in the hundred of Loose having 30 households (of which 16 were free). The majority of lands were held under the local Lord, William of Bouville.

=== Letheringham Priory ===
This priory, a small cell of the Ipswich Augustinian Priory, was founded end of the 12th century and dedicated to the Blessed Virgin. It remained under the patronage of the de Bovile family until the mid-14th century when it passed to the Wingfields. Following the Dissolution, the Priory was granted in 1539 to Sir Anthony Wingfield. After fire damage in the early 1600s, a descendant of his, Sir Robert Naunton, built a large mansion, Letheringham Abbey, on the site to the south of the monastic church. Through vandalism and neglect the church was in serious disrepair by the late 1700s.

It remains a site of both historical and archaeological interest, particularly the remaining brick gatehouse and the restored church.

== Population ==
As per UK census records:

- 1841 - 164
- 1851 - 206
- 1861 - 208
- 1871 - 174
- 1881 - 202
- 1891 - 209
- 1901 - 160

Letheringham is not listed as a separate entity in census records from 1911 onwards.

== Personalities ==
- Robert Naunton (1563–1635), English politician and writer : location of death
- Sir Robert Wingfield of Letheringham (1403–1454), a son of a senior Sir Robert Wingfield (c. 1370 – 3 May 1409) and Elizabeth Russell
- Captain Edward Maria Wingfield (1550–1631), a soldier, Member of Parliament, (1593) and English colonist in America
- Akenfield, a 1974 film was partly shot on location in Letheringham.
