= Thomas Alvard (merchant, born 1460) =

Merchant (1460–1504)

- Born: 1460
- Died: 1504 (aged 43–44)
- Occupation: Merchant

Thomas Alvard (1460–1504) was a prominent merchant in Ipswich, Suffolk, England.

== Career ==
Alvard exported dairy products, grain, tanned leather and woollen cloth.

== Family life ==
Thomas married Anne, daughter of John River, with whom he had eight children. Their son, Thomas Alvard (1493-1535) became MP for Ipswich and was a servant of Cardinal Thomas Wolsey.
