= John Blatchly =

Schoolmaster, author and local historian

John Marcus Blatchly MBE FSA (7 October 1932 – 3 September 2015) was a schoolmaster, author and noted historian of the county of Suffolk.

== Life ==
The son of Alfred Ernest Blatchly and Edith Selina Giddings, he studied natural sciences at the University of Cambridge and became a chemistry teacher. From 1972 to 1993 he was headmaster of Ipswich School in Suffolk. After retiring, he served as the school's archivist emeritus and published a history of the school.

A keen local historian, he also served as chairman of the Suffolk Records Society and the Ipswich Historic Churches Trust, and president of the Suffolk Institute of Archaeology & History. Blatchly's heritage work included rescuing and cataloguing Ipswich's 16th-century library and leading efforts to erect a bronze statue of Cardinal Wolsey in the town. His passionate interest in Wolsey and in Cardinal's College in Ipswich was reflected in his election in 2014 as Honorary Wolsey Professor at University Campus Suffolk.

Photographs by Blatchly are held at the Conway Library of the Courtauld Institute in London.

== Honours and recognition ==
Blatchly was awarded an MBE in 2006 for services to heritage.

In 2021 Suffolk Record Office opened a purpose-built heritage centre in Ipswich and named the reference library the John Blatchly Local Studies Library in his honour.

== Selected publications ==
- Isaac Johnson of Woodbridge, 1754–1835: that ingenious artist (1979)
- Topographers of Suffolk (1988)
- The Town Library of Ipswich Provided for the Use of the Town Preachers in 1599: A History and Catalogue (1989)
- The Bookplates of Edward Gordon Craig (1997)
- The Bookplates of George Wolfe Plank, and a Selection of his Book Illustrations (2002)
- A Famous Antient Seed-plot of Learning: A History of Ipswich School (2003)
- East-Anglian Ex-Libris: Bookplates and Labels Made Between 1700 and the Present Day (2008)
- Ipswich School: A History in Old Photographs from the 1850s to the 1980s (2009)
- Miracles in Lady Lane: The Ipswich Shrine at the Westgate (2013), with Diarmaid MacCulloch
