= Tournai font =

Type of European baptismal font

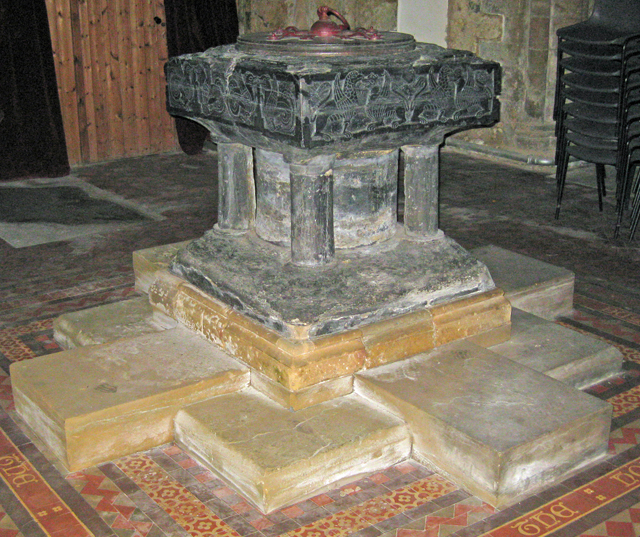
St Lawrence's, Thornton Curtis, Lincolnshire

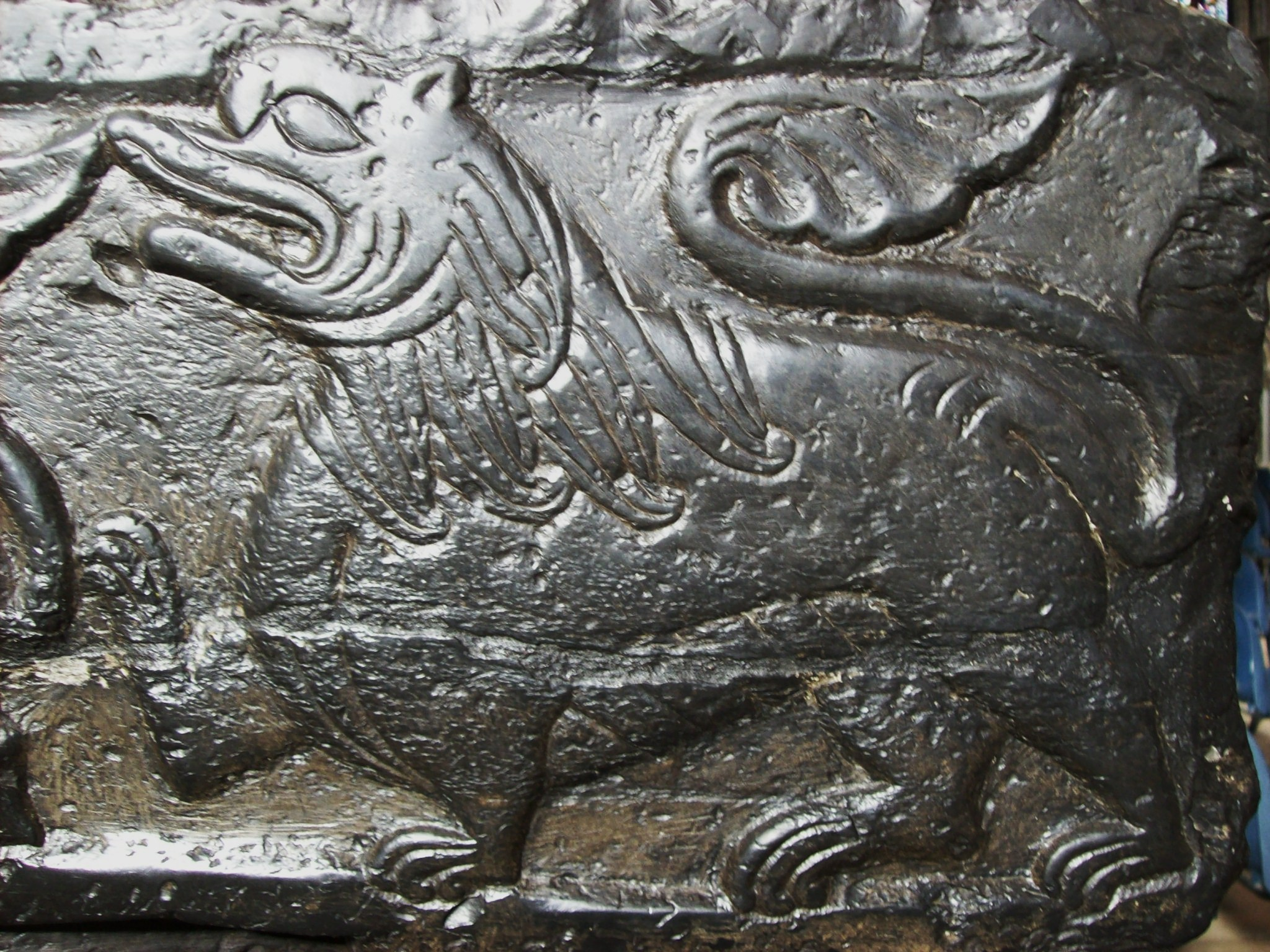
Detail from Lincoln Cathedral

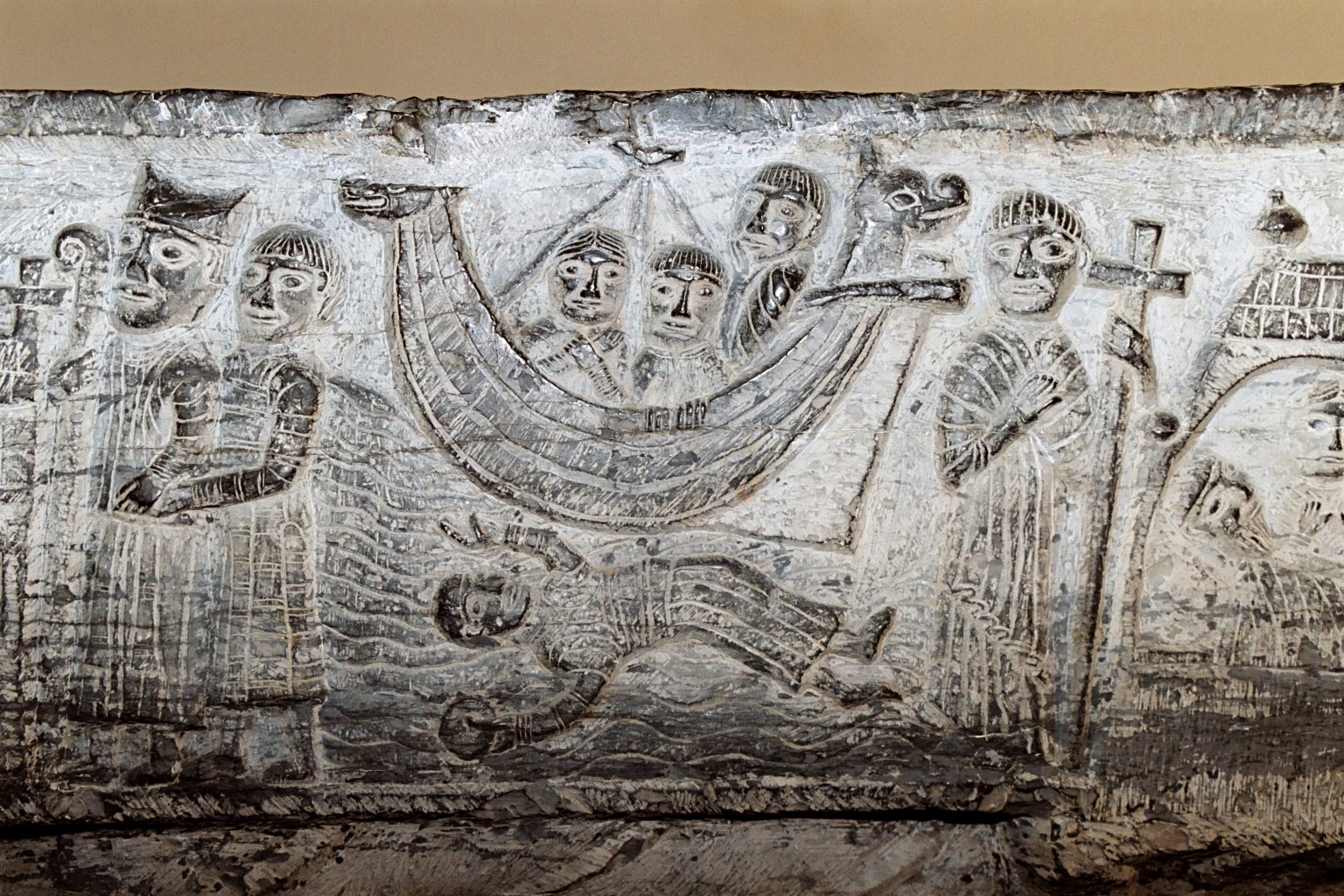
Detail from the life of Saint Nicholas, Zedelgem

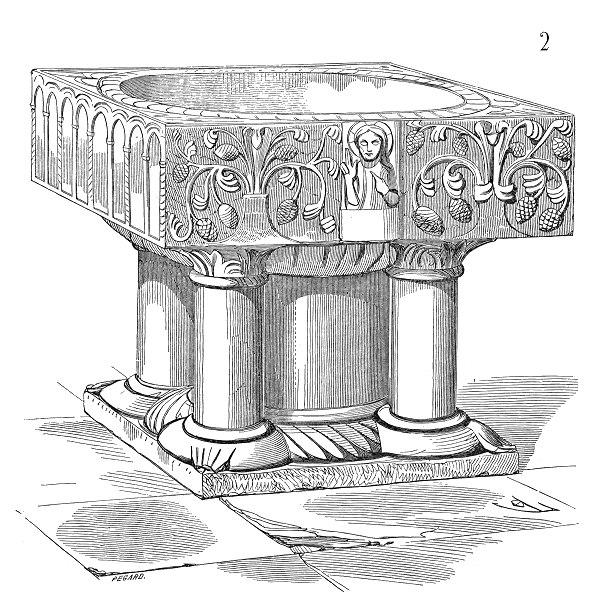
Drawing of the Montdidier font

Tournai fonts are a type of baptismal font made from blue black limestone during the 12th and early 13th centuries in and around the Belgian town of Tournai by local masons. There are seven complete examples in England and a disputed number in Europe: eighty according to one source, or fifty in Northern France and Belgium and two in Germany according to another.

A sculptural tradition, centred around Tournai, arose in the Scheldt valley from the 11th century onwards. This was characterised by its use of low relief (which was a useful feature when a sculpture was transported), hard lines and the depiction of minute detail, these features arising from the hardness of the material used from the 12th century: Tournai marble. As a sculptural style it is distinguished from the contemporary style of Mosan art, and it was used in sculpture in both Ghent and Bruges. The designation "Tournai font" is employed to identify fonts made by local masons who worked the stone, as opposed to at least two other schools of masons who also sculpted the stone.

== Construction ==
The fonts are all sculpted from a single massive block of blue black carboniferous limestone, known as "Tournai marble" (while not a true marble, it was so called as it is capable of taking a polish), quarried from the banks of the Escaut River. This seam of limestone runs from around Boulogne through the Scheldt and Meuse regions at Tournai and Namur to Aachen, and has been quarried and sculpted since Roman times. One of these quarries, at Vaulx-lès-Tournai, is still in operation. As a stone, Tournai marble was prized for its high polish, which made it appear black, and it was popular not only for fonts but also for elements of ecclesiastical architecture (capitals, bases and colonnettes), as well as for tombslabs.

Each font weighs approximately 2 tonnes (2.2 short tons; 2,000 kg; 4,400 lb) and was probably carved before transport; this can be inferred not only from the fact that the stylistic elements (of people, flora and fauna) on all the fonts in England and the continent show a resemblance, and because the fonts themselves are all of the same shape, but also because transport was difficult and expensive, and there would have been little point expending money and effort taking such heavy blocks to a distant site and then discarding up to half the block as waste material.

== Belgium, France and Germany ==
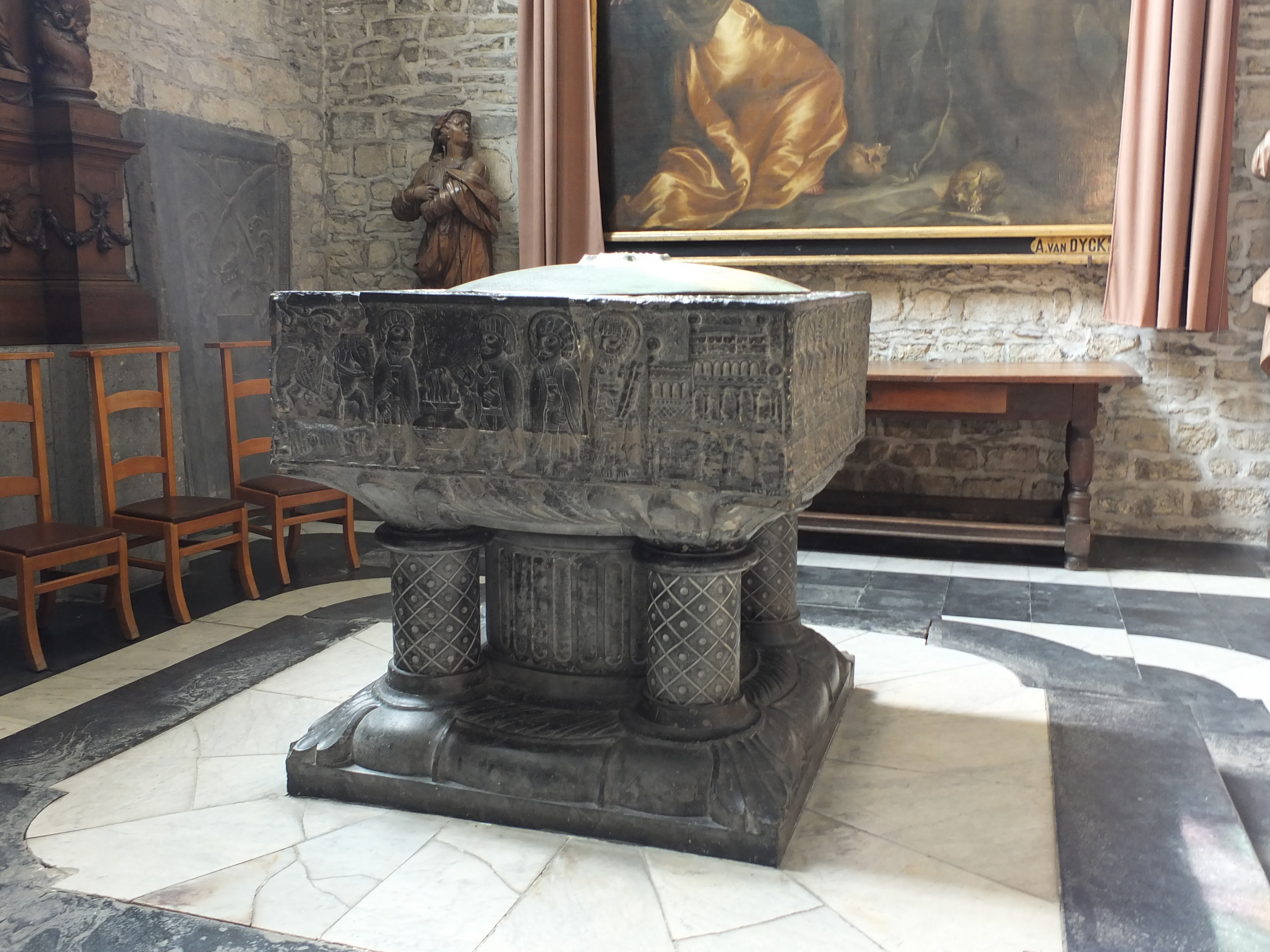
Onze Lieve Vrouwekerk, Dendermonde, Belgium

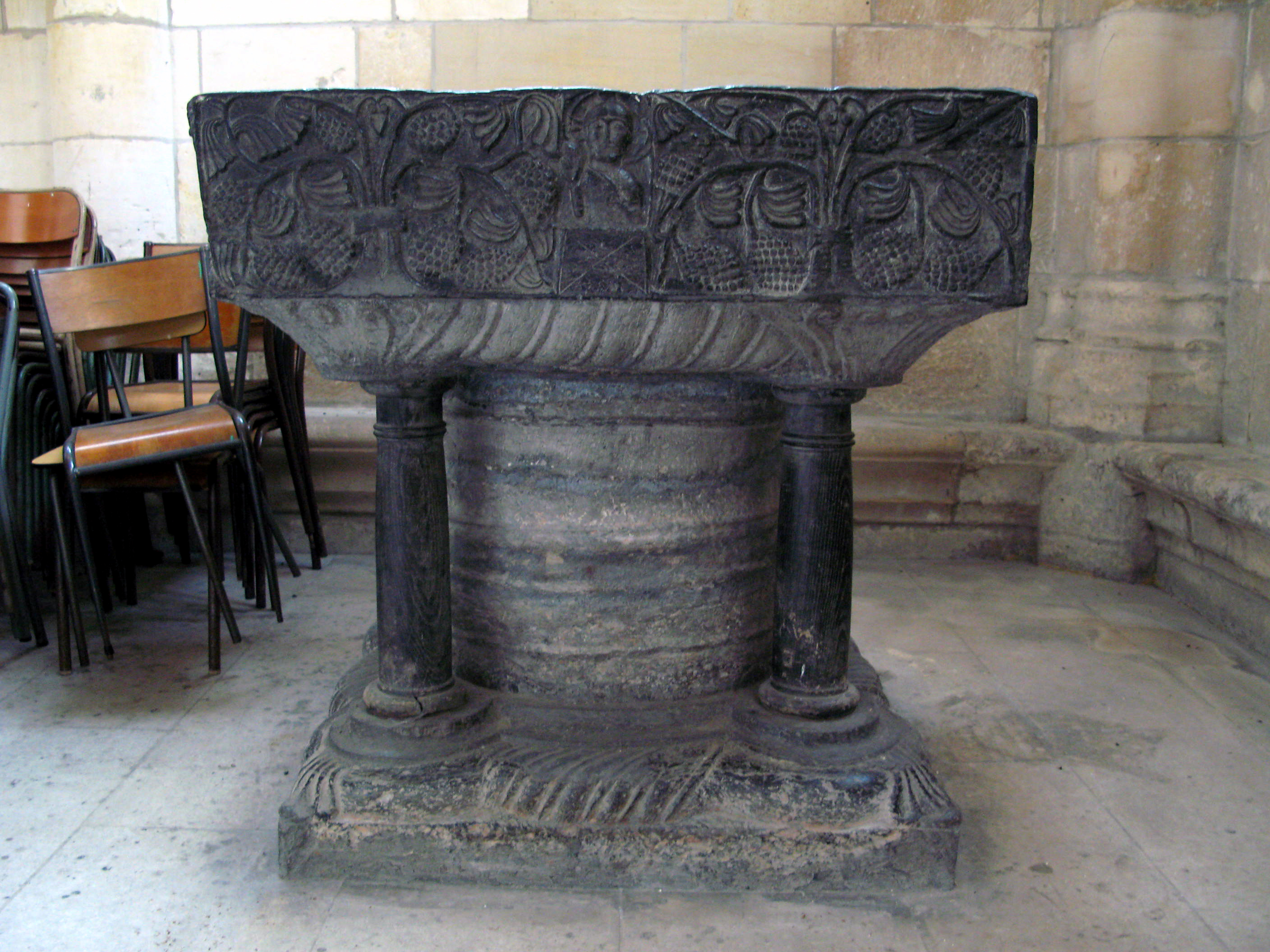
St-Pierre de Montdidier, France

=== Complete fonts in churches ===
The font at Onze Lieve Vrouwekerk, Dendermonde (Belgium) illustrates the story of Saint Peter's denial of Jesus. The font at Wolvertem (Belgium) is unusual in being round, square being the usual shape. There are also complete Tournai fonts in Blessy (France), Deftinge (Belgium), Deux-Acren (Belgium), Guarbecque (France), Hove (Belgium), Lichtervelde (Belgium), Montdidier (St Pierre) (France), La Neuville-lès-Corbie (France), Noordpeene (France), Saint-Just-en-Chaussée (France), Vermand (France), Zedelgem (Belgium) and Zillebeke (Belgium).

==== Bases and fragments ====
Bases of Tournai fonts are in churches in Bourghelles (France), Évin-Malmaison (France), Froyennes (Belgium), Herentals (Belgium), Ichtegem (Belgium), Meilegem (Belgium), Ribemont (France), Roubaix (France) and Saint-Sauveur (Belgium). There are fragments of Tournai fonts in churches in Baardegem, Comines, Ere, Escanaffles (building material), Lampernisse, Lessines (St Pierre) (building material), Nivelles and Soignies.

=== In museums ===
Complete fonts are at Châlons-sur-Marne (cathedral) and Gondecourt, a base at Pervijse, and fragments at Ghent (St Bavon), Kontich, and Rotselaer.

=== Disputed examples ===
Disputed examples of Tournai fonts are at Chéreng, Compiègne (St Antoine), Hautmont, and Laon Cathedral. The fragment at Le Tréport is also disputed.

=== Lost ===
Formerly complete Tournai fonts, now lost, were at the following locations: Gallaix; Neuf-Berquin; St Venant; and Vimy. At Stalhille, a recorded base is lost, as are fragments at Binche, Spiennes, and Spiere. St Venant, destroyed in World War I, had the most complete cycle of the Passion of Christ known on any Romanesque font.

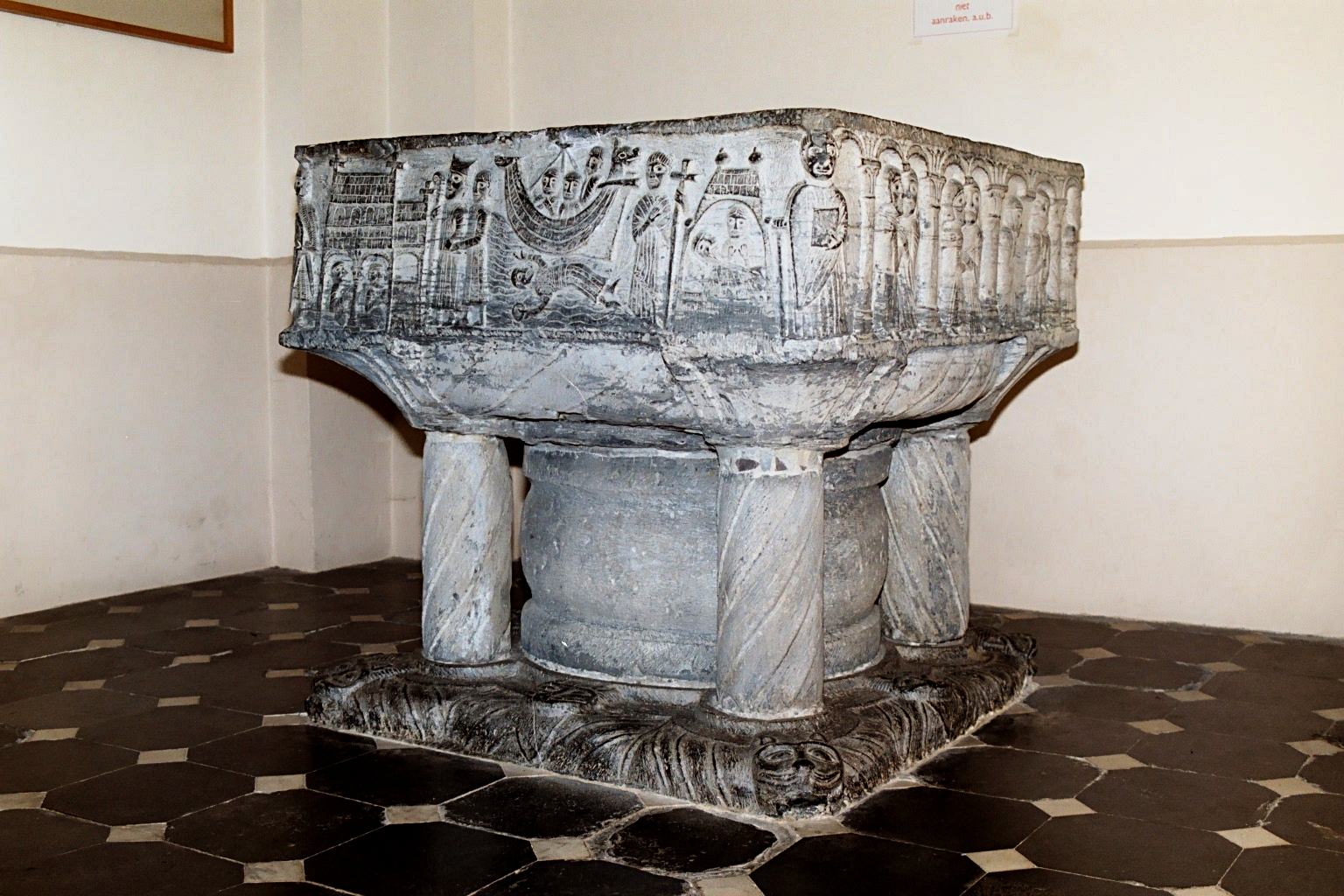
Saint-Laurent, Zedelgem, Belgium

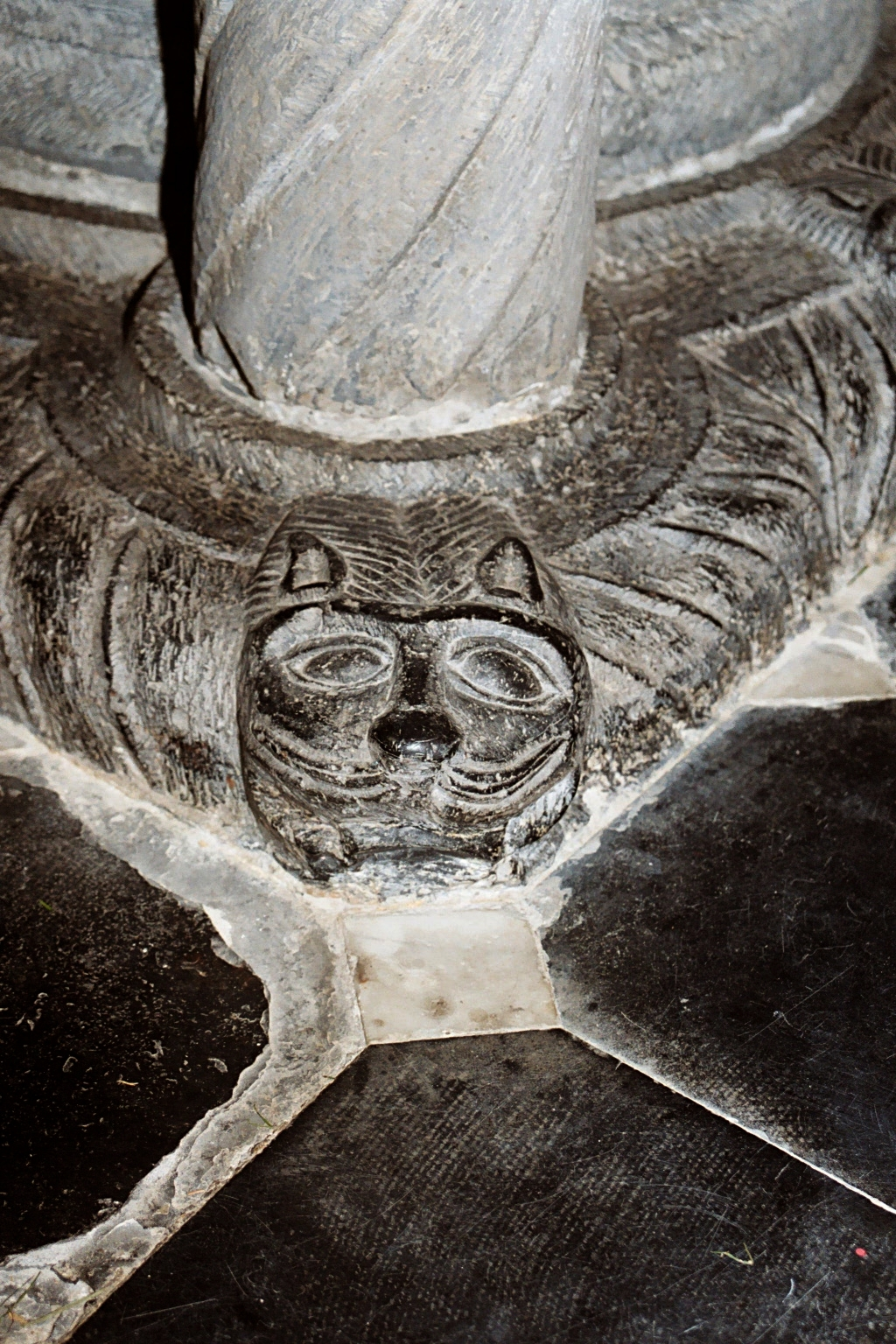
Lion's head on column base at Zedelgem

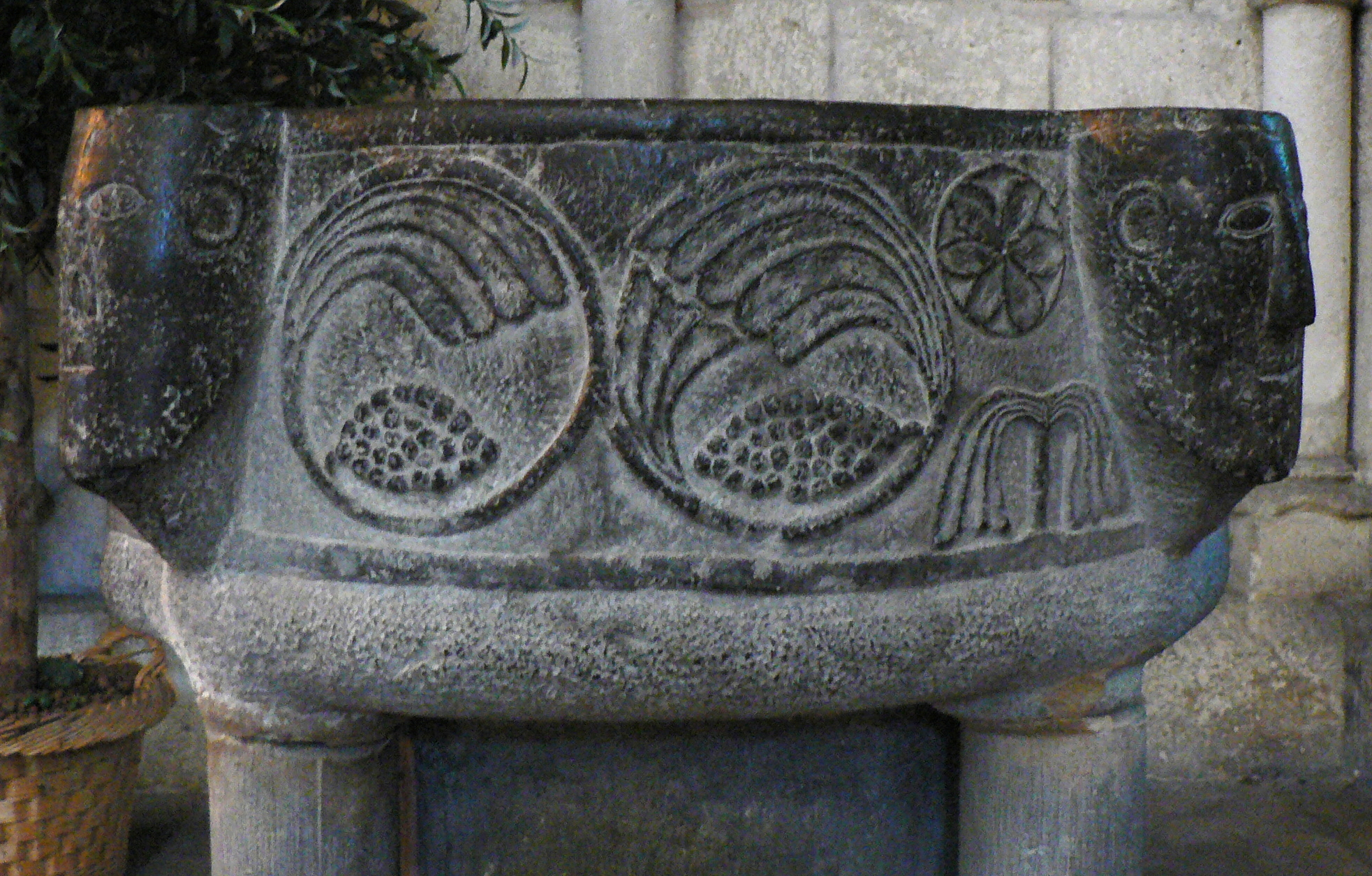
Disputed font in Laon Cathedral, France

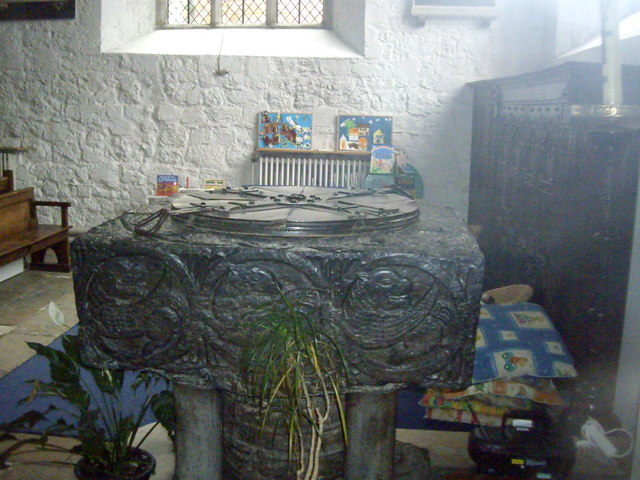
St Michael's Church, Southampton, c. 1170

== England ==
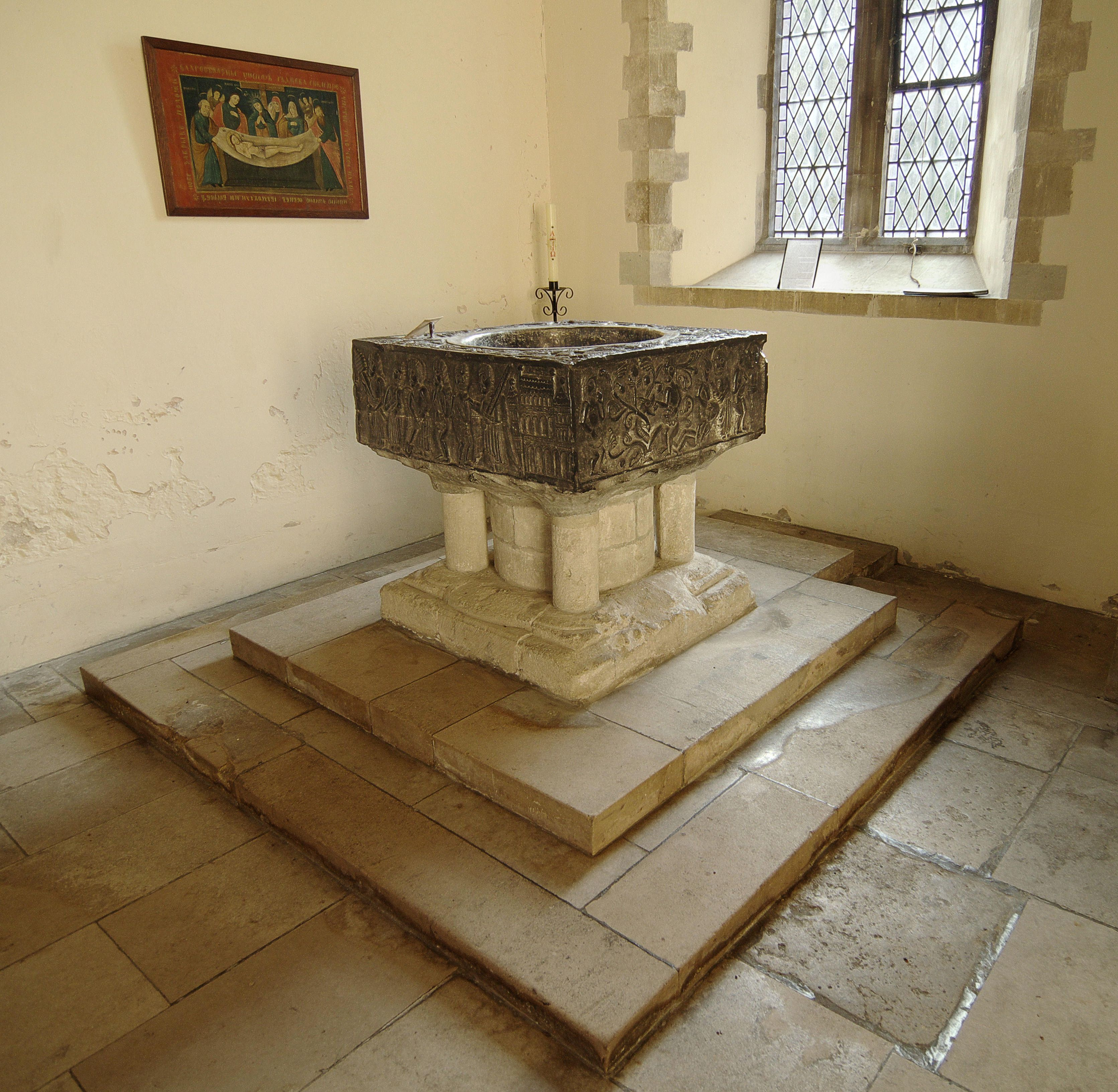
All Saints Church, East Meon, c. 1130–40

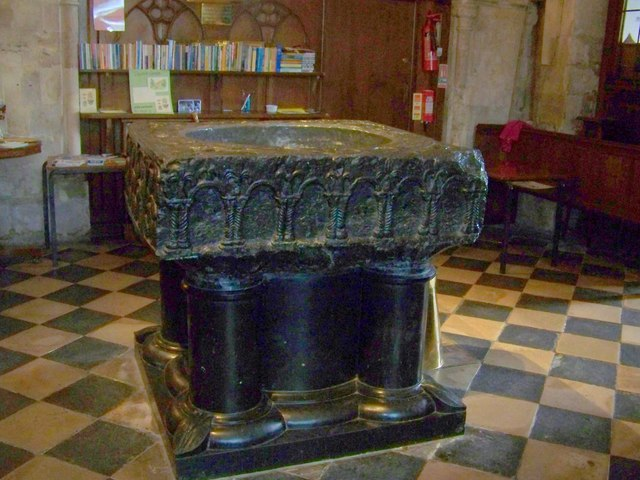
St Peter's, St Mary Bourne

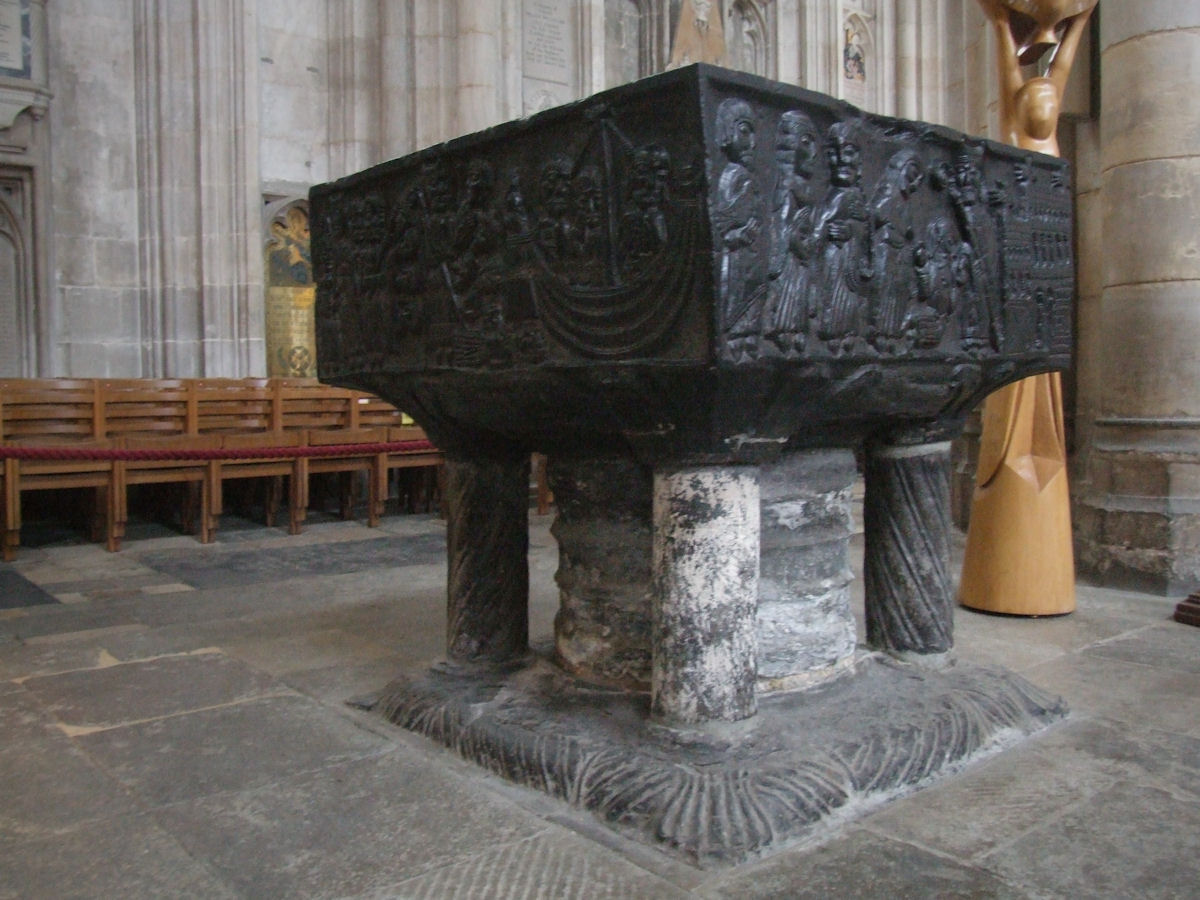
Winchester Cathedral, c. 1160–70

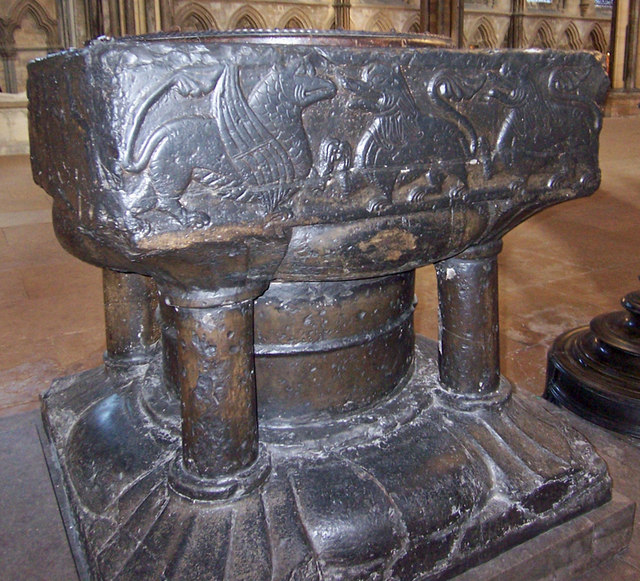
Lincoln Cathedral

For their transport to England, Tournai fonts were exported under the protection of a caravan organised by the Tournai guild known as the Charité-St-Christophe. and taken either over land to Boulogne and across the Channel, or down the Scheldt. On account of their weight and the difficulty of land transport, their ultimate destinations were locations on the south or east coast, or places accessible by river.

=== Hampshire ===
The Charité-St-Christophe had commercial links with Winchester, and probably brought the four Hampshire fonts to the county, most likely under the patronage of Henry of Blois.

==== All Saints, East Meon ====
The font of c. 1130–40 was probably a gift to the church from Henry of Blois, Bishop of Winchester. The friezes on its sides depict the creation of Adam and Eve and the Temptation (north face); the Expulsion from the Garden of Eden and Adam being shown how to dig (east face); and various animals, birds and dragons on the south and west faces.

==== St Peter's, St Mary Bourne, Hampshire ====
This is the largest of the English fonts and, according to Pevsner, "one of the most splendid". There are arches on coupled colonnettes on the north and west faces; on the east and south faces are trees of life with grapes. The top of the font is circled with reeds; the corners display two birds drinking and leaves, forming an "oriental motif". A new base for the font was made in 1927 in Tournai.

==== St Michael's, Southampton ====
Located in the south-west corner of the church, the font's decoration is to Pevsner "far more elementary than that on the font at Winchester". Each face has three medallions, on eleven of which "grotesque figures" are carved, mostly with wings, with a single man carved on the twelfth. The pillars that support the font are not made of Tournai marble but of Purbeck marble, and are renewed.

==== Winchester Cathedral ====
The font in Winchester Cathedral – the "most famous" of the Tournai fonts in England – illustrates scenes from the life of St Nicholas of Myra on two faces, with three roundels of birds on the third and a roundel of a quadruped with birds on either side on the fourth. It is the only font in the cathedral, and is located in the nave.

=== Lincolnshire ===
St Lawrence's, Thornton Curtis, and Lincoln Cathedral, where the font is located on the south side of the nave. It has leaves on the corners of the base, with the faces showing "quadrupeds, mostly monstrous", and palmettes on the top. Alexander of Lincoln, Bishop of Lincoln, has usually been credited with the commissioning of the font in Lincoln Cathedral, but recent scholarship has suggested that it was commissioned by his successor, Robert de Chesney.

=== Suffolk ===
==== St Peter's, Ipswich ====
The font in St Peter's Church, Ipswich, is from c. 1170–90, resting on a 15th-century base, and is at the west end of the nave. One each face of the font are three lions statant gardant, with pillars separating them. It has been argued that the position of the lions on each face, with the lion at each angle facing outwards, was to avoid the lions pointing their rear ends towards the altar, but this has been questioned. The font used to be located close to the west respond of the south nave arcade.

=== Fragment ===
A fragment of the bowl of a Tournai font was found in Ipswich and is now in Ipswich Museum. It has been suggested that it came from the nearby Christchurch priory.

=== Disputed examples ===
The original list of seven fonts was made by Allen and Kitchen in an 1894 article. There have subsequently been four suggested additions:

- Romsey Abbey, Hampshire. This existence of this font, apparently destroyed in a fire of 1850, has never been verified.
- St Mary the Virgin, Iffley, Oxfordshire. This black limestone font is unlike any of the known Tournai fonts.
- St Michael's, Boulge, Suffolk. Pevsner claims this is a Tournai font, albeit one with the relief statuary chipped off, but Henry Munro Cautley states that it is Purbeck marble from around 1210. Drake claims that the finish is too smooth for it ever to have had statuary.
- St George’s, Preshute, Marlborough

== United States ==
A fragment of a Tournai font is in the museum at Bryn Athyn, Pennsylvania.
