= Monewden =

Village and civil parish in Suffolk, United Kingdom

Coordinates: 52.179°N 1.274°E

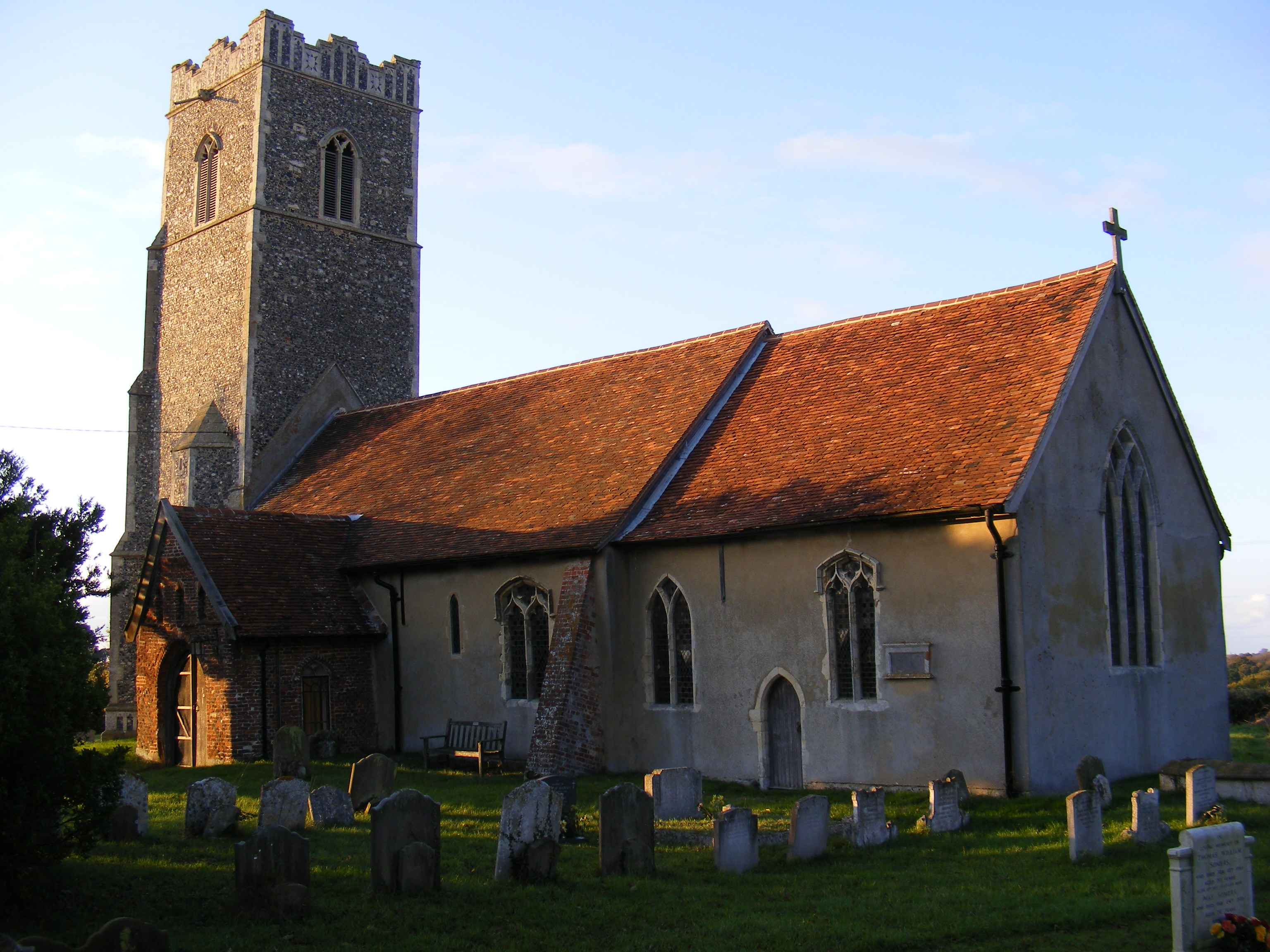
St Mary's church

Monewden (/ˈmɒnədən/ MON-ə-dən) is a small village and a civil parish in the hundred of Loss (Also: Loes, Loose), in the East Suffolk District, in the English county of Suffolk. The population of the civil parish as of the 2011 census was 120. The village is located around 12 miles (19 km) north of Ipswich and 4 miles (6.4 km) west of Wickham Market.

The village church is dedicated to St Mary. Two Sites of Special Scientific Interest are located in the parish, High House Meadows and Monewden Meadows, both areas of unimproved lowland grass meadow.
