= Thomas Alvard (Ipswich MP) =

(ALFORD) (by 1493–1535) of London and Ipswich, Suff

- Born: 1493
- Died: 1535 (aged 41–42)
- Occupations: Merchant, politician

Thomas Alvard (1493–1535) was an Ipswich merchant who entered into service with Thomas Wolsey and the Crown. He served as Member of Parliament for Ipswich.

He was the eldest son of the merchant Thomas Alvard of Ipswich and Woodbridge and his wife, the daughter and heir of John Rivers of Ipswich. She was also the widow of William Wimbill.

== Cardinal College of St. Mary, Ipswich ==
In 1531, Alvard acquired the site of Cardinal College of St. Mary, Wolsey's hope for Ipswich to become a seat of learning. This was intended to be the finest educational college in England, but had fallen into neglect upon the fall of Wolsey.

In his role as Member of Parliament and a gentleman usher to Henry VIII, he was granted all the Ipswich property pertaining to "the late Cardynelles College". However, it was not well maintained, becoming a rubbish dump. To this day, the remaining water gate of the college is still used as a dumping ground.
