= 1995 United Kingdom local elections =

- 6 April 1995 (Scotland); 4 May 1995 (England & Wales)

All 36 metropolitan boroughs, all 14 unitary authorities, all 274 English districts, 29 out of 32 Scottish council areas and all 22 Welsh principal areas
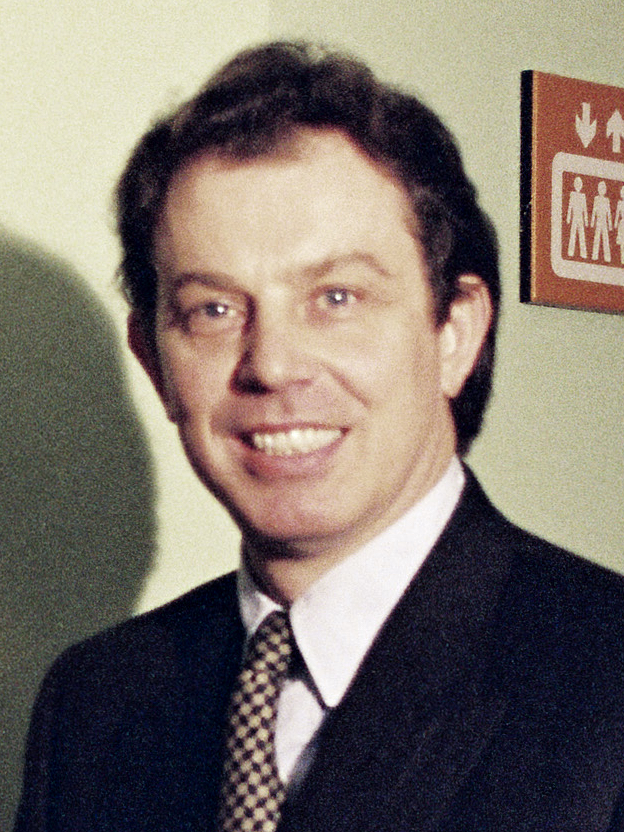

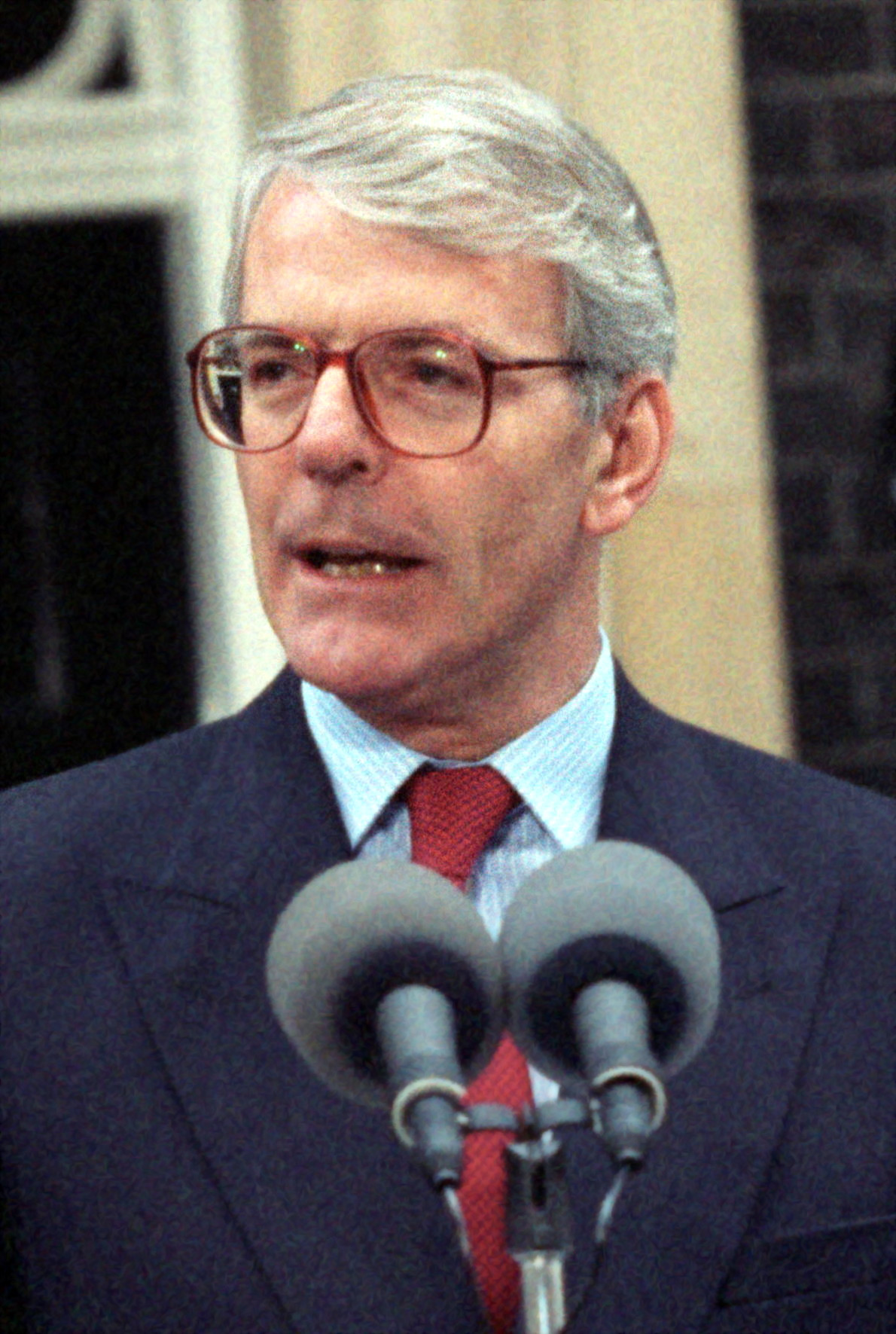

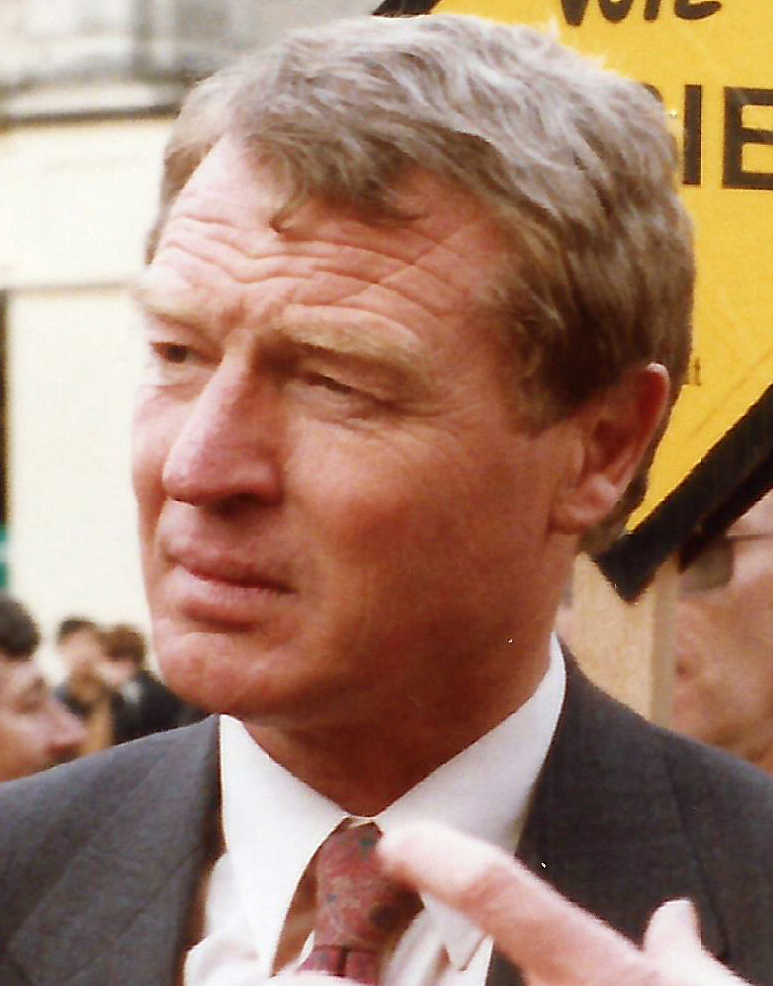
	Majority party	Minority party	Third party
Leader	Tony Blair	John Major	Paddy Ashdown
Party	Labour	Conservative	Liberal Democrats
Leader since	21 July 1994	27 November 1990	16 July 1988
Percentage	47%	25%	23%
Councils +/-	▲39	▼58	▲17
Councillors	5,647	2,069	2,712
Councillors +/-	▲1,807	▼2,018	▲487
- Colours denote the winning party, as shown in the main table of results.

The 1995 United Kingdom local elections took place on Thursday 6 April 1995 in Scotland, and Thursday 4 May 1995 in England and Wales. The Conservative Party lost over 2,000 councillors in the election, while the Labour Party won 48% of the vote, a record high for the party in local elections. The Labour Party took control of 39 more councils, the Liberal Democrats took control of 17 more, whereas the Conservatives lost control of 58 councils.

The elections were the first to be contested under Labour's new leadership of Tony Blair, who had been elected the previous year following the sudden death of his predecessor John Smith.

This was also the first election of 22 Welsh and 14 English unitary authorities, creating shadow authorities which ran in parallel with existing councils until taking power in April 1996, except for the new Isle of Wight Council which took power immediately.

== England ==
=== Metropolitan boroughs ===
All 36 metropolitan borough councils had one third of their seats up for election.

Council	Previous control	Result	Details
Barnsley	Labour	Labour hold	Details
Birmingham	Labour	Labour hold	Details
Bolton	Labour	Labour hold	Details
Bradford	Labour	Labour hold	Details
Bury	No overall control	Labour gain	Details
Calderdale	No overall control	Labour gain	Details
Coventry	Labour	Labour hold	Details
Doncaster	Labour	Labour hold	Details
Dudley	Labour	Labour hold	Details
Gateshead	Labour	Labour hold	Details
Kirklees	No overall control	Labour gain	Details
Knowsley	Labour	Labour hold	Details
Leeds	Labour	Labour hold	Details
Liverpool	No overall control	No overall control hold	Details
Manchester	Labour	Labour hold	Details
Newcastle upon Tyne	Labour	Labour hold	Details
North Tyneside	Labour	Labour hold	Details
Oldham	No overall control	Labour gain	Details
Rochdale	No overall control	No overall control hold	Details
Rotherham	Labour	Labour hold	Details
Salford	Labour	Labour hold	Details
Sandwell	Labour	Labour hold	Details
Sefton	No overall control	No overall control hold	Details
Sheffield	Labour	Labour hold	Details
Solihull	No overall control	No overall control hold	Details
South Tyneside	Labour	Labour hold	Details
St Helens	Labour	Labour hold	Details
Stockport	No overall control	No overall control hold	Details
Sunderland	Labour	Labour hold	Details
Tameside	Labour	Labour hold	Details
Trafford	Conservative	No overall control gain	Details
Wakefield	Labour	Labour hold	Details
Walsall	No overall control	Labour gain	Details
Wigan	Labour	Labour hold	Details
Wirral	No overall control	Labour gain	Details
Wolverhampton	Labour	Labour hold	Details

=== Unitary authorities ===
These were the first elections to the first 14 unitary authorities established by the Local Government Commission for England (1992). The Isle of Wight Council assumed its new status immediately; the others acted as "shadow authorities" until 1 April 1996.

Council	Previous control	Result	Details
Bath and North East Somerset ‡	New Council	No overall control	Details
Bristol	New Council	Labour	Details
East Riding of Yorkshire ‡	New Council	No overall control	Details
Hartlepool	New Council	Labour	Details
Isle of Wight ‡	New Council	Liberal Democrats	Details
Kingston upon Hull	New Council	Labour	Details
Middlesbrough	New Council	Labour	Details
North East Lincolnshire ‡	New Council	Labour	Details
North Lincolnshire ‡	New Council	Labour	Details
North Somerset	New Council	No overall control	Details
Redcar and Cleveland	New Council	Labour	Details
South Gloucestershire ‡	New Council	No overall control	Details
Stockton-on-Tees	New Council	Labour	Details
York ‡	New Council	Labour	Details

‡ New ward boundaries from predecessor authorities

=== District councils ===
==== Whole council ====
In 167 districts the whole council was up for election.

These were the last elections to the district councils of Blackpool, Bournemouth, Bracknell Forest, Darlington, Leicester, Luton, Newbury, Nottingham, Plymouth, Poole, Rutland, The Wrekin, Torbay, Warrington and Windsor and Maidenhead before they were made unitary authorities by the Local Government Commission for England (1992).

These were also the last elections to the district councils of Hove and Rochester-upon-Medway before they were abolished and replaced by unitary authorities by the Local Government Commission for England (1992).

Council	Previous control	Result	Details
Allerdale	Labour	Labour hold	Details
Alnwick	Liberal Democrats	No overall control gain	Details
Arun	Conservative	Conservative hold	Details
Ashfield	Labour	Labour hold	Details
Ashford	Conservative	No overall control gain	Details
Aylesbury Vale	No overall control	Liberal Democrats gain	Details
Babergh	No overall control	No overall control hold	Details
Berwick-upon-Tweed	No overall control	No overall control hold	Details
Blaby	Conservative	No overall control gain	Details
Blackpool	Labour	Labour hold	Details
Blyth Valley	Labour	Labour hold	Details
Bolsover	Labour	Labour hold	Details
Boston	No overall control	No overall control hold	Details
Bournemouth	No overall control	No overall control hold	Details
Bracknell Forest	Conservative	Labour gain	Details
Braintree	No overall control	Labour gain	Details
Breckland	Conservative	No overall control gain	Details
Bridgnorth	Independent	Independent hold	Details
Bromsgrove	Conservative	Labour gain	Details
Broxtowe	Conservative	Labour gain	Details
Canterbury	No overall control	No overall control hold	Details
Caradon	Independent	No overall control gain	Details
Carrick	Liberal Democrats	No overall control gain	Details
Castle Morpeth	No overall control	No overall control hold	Details
Castle Point	Conservative	Labour gain	Details
Charnwood	Conservative	Labour gain	Details
Chelmsford	No overall control	Liberal Democrats gain	Details
Chesterfield	Labour	Labour hold	Details
Chester-le-Street	Labour	Labour hold	Details
Chichester	Conservative	No overall control gain	Details
Chiltern	Conservative	No overall control gain	Details
Christchurch	Conservative	No overall control gain	Details
Copeland	Labour	Labour hold	Details
Corby	Labour	Labour hold	Details
Cotswold	Independent	Independent hold	Details
Dacorum	Conservative	Labour gain	Details
Darlington	Labour	Labour hold	Details
Dartford	Conservative	Labour gain	Details
Derbyshire Dales	Conservative	No overall control gain	Details
Derwentside	Labour	Labour hold	Details
Dover	No overall control	Labour gain	Details
Durham	Labour	Labour hold	Details
Easington	Labour	Labour hold	Details
East Cambridgeshire	Independent	Independent hold	Details
East Devon	Conservative	No overall control gain	Details
East Dorset	No overall control	Liberal Democrats gain	Details
East Hampshire	No overall control	Liberal Democrats gain	Details
East Hertfordshire	Conservative	No overall control gain	Details
East Lindsey	Independent	Independent hold	Details
East Northamptonshire	Conservative	Labour gain	Details
East Staffordshire	No overall control	Labour gain	Details
Eden	Independent	Independent hold	Details
Epsom and Ewell	Independent	Independent hold	Details
Erewash	Labour	Labour hold	Details
Fenland	Conservative	Labour gain	Details
Forest Heath	Conservative	No overall control gain	Details
Forest of Dean	Labour	Labour hold	Details
Fylde	No overall control	No overall control hold	Details
Gedling	Conservative	Labour gain	Details
Gravesham	No overall control	Labour gain	Details
Guildford	No overall control	Liberal Democrats gain	Details
Hambleton	Conservative	No overall control gain	Details
Harborough	Conservative	No overall control gain	Details
High Peak	No overall control	Labour gain	Details
Hinckley and Bosworth	Conservative	No overall control gain	Details
Horsham	Conservative	Liberal Democrats gain	Details
Hove	Conservative	Labour gain	Details
Kennet	No overall control	No overall control hold	Details
Kerrier	No overall control	No overall control hold	Details
Kettering	No overall control	Labour gain	Details
King's Lynn and West Norfolk	Conservative	Labour gain	Details
Lancaster	No overall control	Labour gain	Details
Leicester	Labour	Labour hold	Details
Lewes	Liberal Democrats	Liberal Democrats hold	Details
Lichfield	Conservative	Labour gain	Details
Luton	Labour	Labour hold	Details
Maldon	No overall control	No overall control hold	Details
Malvern Hills	Independent	No overall control gain	Details
Mansfield	Labour	Labour hold	Details
Melton	Conservative	No overall control gain	Details
Mendip	No overall control	No overall control hold	Details
Mid Bedfordshire	Conservative	No overall control gain	Details
Mid Devon	Independent	Liberal Democrats gain	Details
Mid Suffolk	No overall control	No overall control hold	Details
Mid Sussex	Conservative	Liberal Democrats gain	Details
New Forest	No overall control	Liberal Democrats gain	Details
Newark and Sherwood	Labour	Labour hold	Details
Newbury	Liberal Democrats	Liberal Democrats hold	Details
North Cornwall	Independent	Independent hold	Details
North Devon	Liberal Democrats	Liberal Democrats hold	Details
North Dorset	Independent	Liberal Democrats gain	Details
North East Derbyshire	Labour	Labour hold	Details
North Kesteven	No overall control	No overall control hold	Details
North Norfolk	No overall control	No overall control hold	Details
North Shropshire	Independent	Independent hold	Details
North Warwickshire	Labour	Labour hold	Details
North West Leicestershire	Labour	Labour hold	Details
North Wiltshire	Liberal Democrats	Liberal Democrats hold	Details
Northampton	No overall control	Labour gain	Details
Nottingham	Labour	Labour hold	Details
Oadby and Wigston	Liberal Democrats	Liberal Democrats hold	Details
Oswestry	Independent	Independent hold	Details
Plymouth	Labour	Labour hold	Details
Poole	Liberal Democrats	Liberal Democrats hold	Details
Restormel	Liberal Democrats	Liberal Democrats hold	Details
Ribble Valley	Conservative	No overall control gain	Details
Richmondshire	Independent	Independent hold	Details
Rochester-upon-Medway	No overall control	Labour gain	Details
Rother	No overall control	No overall control hold	Details
Rushcliffe	Conservative	No overall control gain	Details
Rutland	No overall control	Independent gain	Details
Ryedale	No overall control	Liberal Democrats gain	Details
Salisbury	No overall control	Liberal Democrats gain	Details
Scarborough	No overall control	No overall control hold	Details
Sedgefield	Labour	Labour hold	Details
Sedgemoor	Conservative	No overall control gain	Details
Selby	No overall control	Labour gain	Details
Sevenoaks	Conservative	No overall control gain	Details
Shepway	Liberal Democrats	No overall control gain	Details
South Bucks	Conservative	No overall control gain	Details
South Derbyshire	Labour	Labour hold	Details
South Hams	Conservative	No overall control gain	Details
South Holland	Independent	Independent hold	Details
South Kesteven	No overall control	No overall control hold	Details
South Norfolk	No overall control	Liberal Democrats gain	Details
South Northamptonshire	Conservative	No overall control gain	Details
South Oxfordshire	Conservative	No overall control gain	Details
South Ribble	Conservative	Labour gain	Details
South Shropshire	Independent	Independent hold	Details
South Somerset	Liberal Democrats	Liberal Democrats hold	Details
South Staffordshire	Conservative	Conservative hold	Details
Spelthorne	Conservative	Conservative hold	Details
St Edmundsbury	Conservative	Labour gain	Details
Stafford	No overall control	Labour gain	Details
Staffordshire Moorlands	Independent	No overall control gain	Details
Suffolk Coastal	Conservative	No overall control gain	Details
Surrey Heath	Conservative	Conservative hold	Details
Taunton Deane	Liberal Democrats	Liberal Democrats hold	Details
Teesdale	Independent	Independent hold	Details
Teignbridge	No overall control	No overall control hold	Details
Tendring	No overall control	Labour gain	Details
Test Valley	Conservative	No overall control gain	Details
Tewkesbury	Independent	No overall control gain	Details
Thanet	Conservative	Labour gain	Details
The Wrekin	Labour	Labour hold	Details
Tonbridge and Malling	Conservative	No overall control gain	Details
Torbay	Liberal Democrats	Liberal Democrats hold	Details
Torridge	Independent	No overall control gain	Details
Tynedale	No overall control	No overall control hold	Details
Uttlesford	Conservative	No overall control gain	Details
Vale of White Horse	Conservative	Liberal Democrats gain	Details
Vale Royal	Labour	Labour hold	Details
Wansbeck	Labour	Labour hold	Details
Warrington	Labour	Labour hold	Details
Warwick	Conservative	No overall control gain	Details
Waverley	No overall control	Liberal Democrats gain	Details
Wealden	Conservative	No overall control gain	Details
Wear Valley	No overall control	Labour gain	Details
Wellingborough	Conservative	No overall control gain	Details
West Devon	Independent	Liberal Democrats gain	Details
West Dorset	No overall control	No overall control hold	Details
West Somerset	Independent	No overall control gain	Details
West Wiltshire	Liberal Democrats	Liberal Democrats hold	Details
Windsor and Maidenhead	No overall control	Liberal Democrats gain	Details
Wychavon	Conservative	No overall control gain	Details
Wycombe	Conservative	No overall control gain	Details
Wyre	Conservative	Labour gain	Details

==== Third of council ====
In 107 districts one third of the council was up for election.

These were the last elections to the district councils of Derby, Milton Keynes, Portsmouth, Southampton, Stoke-on-Trent and Thamesdown before they were made unitary authorities by the Local Government Commission for England (1992).

These were also the last elections to the district council of Brighton before it was abolished and replaced by a unitary authority by the Local Government Commission for England (1992).

Council	Previous control	Result	Details
Adur	Liberal Democrats	Liberal Democrats hold	Details
Amber Valley	Labour	Labour hold	Details
Barrow-in-Furness	Labour	Labour hold	Details
Basildon	No overall control	No overall control hold	Details
Basingstoke and Deane	Conservative	No overall control gain	Details
Bassetlaw	Labour	Labour hold	Details
Bedford	No overall control	No overall control hold	Details
Blackburn	Labour	Labour hold	Details
Brentwood	Liberal Democrats	Liberal Democrats hold	Details
Brighton	Labour	Labour hold	Details
Broadland	No overall control	No overall control hold	Details
Broxbourne	Conservative	Conservative hold	Details
Burnley	Labour	Labour hold	Details
Cambridge	No overall control	No overall control hold	Details
Cannock Chase	Labour	Labour hold	Details
Carlisle	Labour	Labour hold	Details
Cheltenham	Liberal Democrats	Liberal Democrats hold	Details
Cherwell	Conservative	No overall control gain	Details
Chester	No overall control	No overall control hold	Details
Chorley	No overall control	Labour gain	Details
Colchester	Liberal Democrats	Liberal Democrats hold	Details
Congleton	Liberal Democrats	Liberal Democrats hold	Details
Craven	No overall control	No overall control hold	Details
Crawley	Labour	Labour hold	Details
Crewe and Nantwich	Labour	Labour hold	Details
Daventry	Conservative	No overall control gain	Details
Derby	Labour	Labour hold	Details
Eastbourne	Liberal Democrats	Liberal Democrats hold	Details
Eastleigh	Liberal Democrats	Liberal Democrats hold	Details
Ellesmere Port and Neston	Labour	Labour hold	Details
Elmbridge	No overall control	No overall control hold	Details
Epping Forest	No overall control	No overall control hold	Details
Exeter	No overall control	Labour gain	Details
Fareham	No overall control	No overall control hold	Details
Gillingham	No overall control	Liberal Democrats gain	Details
Gloucester	No overall control	Labour gain	Details
Gosport	Liberal Democrats	Liberal Democrats hold	Details
Great Yarmouth	Labour	Labour hold	Details
Halton	Labour	Labour hold	Details
Harlow	Labour	Labour hold	Details
Harrogate	Liberal Democrats	Liberal Democrats hold	Details
Hart	No overall control	No overall control hold	Details
Hastings	No overall control	No overall control hold	Details
Havant	No overall control	No overall control hold	Details
Hereford	Liberal Democrats	Liberal Democrats hold	Details
Hertsmere	No overall control	No overall control hold	Details
Huntingdonshire	Conservative	Conservative hold	Details
Hyndburn	Labour	Labour hold	Details
Ipswich	Labour	Labour hold	Details
Leominster	Independent	No overall control gain	Details
Lincoln	Labour	Labour hold	Details
Macclesfield	Conservative	Conservative hold	Details
Maidstone	No overall control	No overall control hold	Details
Milton Keynes	No overall control	No overall control hold	Details
Mole Valley	Liberal Democrats	No overall control gain	Details
Newcastle-under-Lyme	Labour	Labour hold	Details
North Hertfordshire	No overall control	No overall control hold	Details
Norwich	Labour	Labour hold	Details
Nuneaton and Bedworth	Labour	Labour hold	Details
Oxford	Labour	Labour hold	Details
Pendle	No overall control	Liberal Democrats gain	Details
Penwith	No overall control	No overall control hold	Details
Peterborough	No overall control	No overall control hold	Details
Portsmouth	No overall control	Labour gain	Details
Preston	Labour	Labour hold	Details
Purbeck	No overall control	No overall control hold	Details
Reading	Labour	Labour hold	Details
Redditch	Labour	Labour hold	Details
Reigate and Banstead	No overall control	No overall control hold	Details
Rochford	Liberal Democrats	Liberal Democrats hold	Details
Rossendale	Labour	Labour hold	Details
Rugby	No overall control	No overall control hold	Details
Runnymede	Conservative	Conservative hold	Details
Rushmoor	Conservative	No overall control gain	Details
Shrewsbury and Atcham	No overall control	No overall control hold	Details
Slough	Labour	Labour hold	Details
South Bedfordshire	Conservative	No overall control gain	Details
South Cambridgeshire	No overall control	No overall control hold	Details
South Herefordshire	Independent	Independent hold	Details
South Lakeland	No overall control	No overall control hold	Details
Southampton	No overall control	Labour gain	Details
Southend-on-Sea	No overall control	No overall control hold	Details
St Albans	Liberal Democrats	Liberal Democrats hold	Details
Stevenage	Labour	Labour hold	Details
Stoke-on-Trent	Labour	Labour hold	Details
Stratford-on-Avon	No overall control	No overall control hold	Details
Stroud	No overall control	No overall control hold	Details
Swale	No overall control	No overall control hold	Details
Tamworth	Labour	Labour hold	Details
Tandridge	Conservative	No overall control gain	Details
Thamesdown	Labour	Labour hold	Details
Three Rivers	No overall control	No overall control hold	Details
Thurrock	Labour	Labour hold	Details
Tunbridge Wells	No overall control	No overall control hold	Details
Watford	Labour	Labour hold	Details
Waveney	Labour	Labour hold	Details
Welwyn Hatfield	Labour	Labour hold	Details
West Lancashire	Labour	Labour hold	Details
West Lindsey	No overall control	No overall control hold	Details
West Oxfordshire	No overall control	No overall control hold	Details
Weymouth and Portland	No overall control	No overall control hold	Details
Winchester	No overall control	Liberal Democrats gain	Details
Woking	No overall control	No overall control hold	Details
Wokingham	Conservative	No overall control gain	Details
Worcester	Labour	Labour hold	Details
Worthing	Liberal Democrats	Liberal Democrats hold	Details
Wyre Forest	No overall control	No overall control hold	Details

== Scotland ==
These were the first elections to the 29 council areas established by the Local Government etc. (Scotland) Act 1994.

Council	Previous control	Result	Details
Aberdeen	New Council	Labour	Details
Aberdeenshire	New Council	No overall control	Details
Angus	New Council	SNP	Details
Argyll and Bute	New Council	Independent	Details
Borders†	New Council	No overall control	Details
Clackmannan†	New Council	Labour	Details
Dumbarton and Clydebank†	New Council	Labour	Details
Dumfries and Galloway	New Council	Labour	Details
Dundee	New Council	Labour	Details
East Ayrshire	New Council	Labour	Details
East Dunbartonshire	New Council	Labour	Details
East Lothian	New Council	Labour	Details
East Renfrewshire	New Council	No overall control	Details
Edinburgh	New Council	Labour	Details
Falkirk	New Council	Labour	Details
Fife	New Council	Labour	Details
Glasgow	New Council	Labour	Details
Highland	New Council	Independent	Details
Inverclyde	New Council	Labour	Details
Midlothian	New Council	Labour	Details
Moray	New Council	SNP	Details
North Ayrshire	New Council	Labour	Details
North Lanarkshire	New Council	Labour	Details
Perth and Kinross	New Council	SNP	Details
Renfrewshire	New Council	No overall control	Details
South Ayrshire	New Council	Labour	Details
South Lanarkshire	New Council	Labour	Details
Stirling	New Council	Labour	Details
West Lothian	New Council	Labour	Details

†Council was renamed shortly after election.

== Wales ==
These were the first elections to the 22 principal areas established by the Local Government (Wales) Act 1994.

Council	Previous control	Result	Details
Aberconwy and Colwyn†	New Council	No overall control	Details
Anglesey†	New Council	Independent	Details
Blaenau Gwent	New Council	Labour	Details
Bridgend	New Council	Labour	Details
Caernarfonshire and Merionethshire†	New Council	Plaid Cymru	Details
Caerphilly	New Council	Labour	Details
Cardiff	New Council	Labour	Details
Cardiganshire†	New Council	Independent	Details
Carmarthenshire	New Council	No overall control	Details
Denbighshire	New Council	No overall control	Details
Flintshire	New Council	Labour	Details
Merthyr Tydfil	New Council	Labour	Details
Monmouthshire	New Council	Labour	Details
Neath and Port Talbot†	New Council	Labour	Details
Newport	New Council	Labour	Details
Pembrokeshire	New Council	Independent	Details
Powys	New Council	Independent	Details
Rhondda Cynon Taf	New Council	Labour	Details
Swansea	New Council	Labour	Details
Torfaen	New Council	Labour	Details
Vale of Glamorgan	New Council	Labour	Details
Wrexham	New Council	Labour	Details

†Council was renamed shortly after election.
