= Wansbeck =

Places called Wansbeck include:

- The River Wansbeck, a river in Northumberland, England
- Wansbeck District—a former local government district in south-east Northumberland, through which the river flows
- Wansbeck (UK Parliament constituency)—a constituency in the same area, represented in the UK House of Commons
- Alternative spelling of Wandsbek—a borough of Hamburg, Germany
