= 1995 Bedford Borough Council election =

Bedford Borough Council election

The 1995 Bedford Borough Council election took place on 4 May 1995 to elect members of Bedford Borough Council in England. This was on the same day as other local elections.

== Summary ==
=== Election result ===
1995 Bedford Borough Council election
Party	This election			Full council			This election		
Party	Seats	Net	Seats %	Other	Total	Total %	Votes	Votes %	+/−
Labour	8	▲4	47.1	12	20	37.7	13,883	44.0	+6.1
Conservative	4	▼6	23.5	12	16	30.2	8,109	25.7	–2.8
Liberal Democrats	4	▲1	23.5	8	12	22.6	8,584	27.2	–3.6
Independent	1	▲1	5.9	4	5	9.4	823	2.6	–0.3
Green	0	Steady	0.0	0	0	0.0	170	0.5	N/A

== Ward results ==
=== Brickhill ===
Brickhill
Party	Candidate	Votes	%	±%
Liberal Democrats	Raymond Waterhouse*	1,330	55.1	+5.3
Conservative	M. Summerfield	669	27.7	–15.2
Labour	John Dawson	414	17.2	+9.9
Majority		661	27.4	
Turnout		2,413	41.6	
Registered electors		5,797		
Liberal Democrats hold		Swing		

=== Bromham ===
Bromham
Party	Candidate	Votes	%	±%
Conservative	Dean Laley	1,041	50.9	–25.4
Liberal Democrats	Cheryl Green	618	30.2	+16.4
Labour	R. Gunther	388	19.0	+8.1
Majority		423	20.7	
Turnout		2,047	44.8	
Registered electors		4,569		
Conservative hold		Swing		

=== Castle ===
Castle
Party	Candidate	Votes	%	±%
Labour	Christopher Whitehead	1,151	57.2	+23.3
Conservative	S. Groves	452	22.5	–20.2
Liberal Democrats	Lynda Aylett-Green	408	20.3	–3.1
Majority		699	34.8	
Turnout		2,011	45.9	
Registered electors		4,379		
Labour gain from Conservative		Swing		

=== Cauldwell ===
Cauldwell
Party	Candidate	Votes	%	±%
Labour	Bill Astle*	1,513	81.2	+12.7
Liberal Democrats	Anita Gerard	190	10.2	–4.7
Conservative	S. Sherwood	160	8.6	–8.0
Majority		1,323	71.0	
Turnout		1,863	31.5	
Registered electors		5,908		
Labour hold		Swing		

=== Clapham ===
Clapham
Party	Candidate	Votes	%	±%
Labour	Jennifer Lumsden	331	29.2	+0.5
Independent	Douglas Tomkins	329	29.0	N/A
Conservative	Nigel Sparrow*	305	26.9	–23.7
Liberal Democrats	R. Wickens	169	14.9	–5.8
Majority		2	0.2	
Turnout		1,134	42.6	
Registered electors		2,665		
Labour gain from Conservative		Swing		

=== De Parys ===
De Parys
Party	Candidate	Votes	%	±%
Liberal Democrats	Ralph Hall	1,184	50.8	+6.2
Conservative	David Pinkney	630	27.0	–17.9
Labour	Richard Crane	517	22.2	+11.7
Majority		554	23.8	
Turnout		2,331	42.7	
Registered electors		5,453		
Liberal Democrats gain from Conservative		Swing		

=== Goldington ===
Goldington
Party	Candidate	Votes	%	±%
Liberal Democrats	Tony Ruffin*	1,247	56.1	+9.9
Labour	Stanley Williams	847	38.1	+0.7
Conservative	H. Bushell	128	5.8	–10.7
Majority		400	18.0	
Turnout		2,222	43.3	
Registered electors		5,127		
Liberal Democrats hold		Swing		

=== Great Barford ===
Great Barford
Party	Candidate	Votes	%	±%
Conservative	Carole Ellis*	473	53.2	–9.0
Labour	Pauline Curl	289	32.5	N/A
Liberal Democrats	D. Foster	127	14.3	–23.5
Majority		184	20.7	
Turnout		889	46.5	
Registered electors		1,911		
Conservative hold		Swing		

=== Harpur ===
Harpur
Party	Candidate	Votes	%	±%
Labour	Ian Nicholls	1,275	65.8	+11.0
Conservative	Jean Pilgrim	417	21.5	–14.4
Liberal Democrats	L. Thomas	182	9.4	+0.1
Green	A. Morten	64	3.3	N/A
Majority		858	44.3	
Turnout		1,938	32.9	
Registered electors		5,873		
Labour hold		Swing		

=== Kempston East ===
Kempston East
Party	Candidate	Votes	%	±%
Labour	David Lewis	1,647	59.1	+14.1
Conservative	Nicky Attenborough*	879	31.5	−13.6
Liberal Democrats	C. Kelly	261	9.4	–0.6
Majority		768	27.6	
Turnout		2,787	38.9	
Registered electors		7,169		
Labour gain from Conservative		Swing		

=== Kempston Rural ===
Kempston Rural
Party	Candidate	Votes	%	±%
Conservative	E. Joy	403	40.8	–24.6
Liberal Democrats	N. Stafford	333	33.7	–0.9
Labour	Paban Sharma	252	25.5	N/A
Majority		70	7.1	
Turnout		988	47.4	
Registered electors		2,086		
Conservative hold		Swing		

=== Kempston West ===
Kempston West
Party	Candidate	Votes	%	±%
Labour	Christopher Black	1,419	62.7	+19.9
Conservative	Richard Hyde	619	27.4	–20.5
Liberal Democrats	D. Lodge	225	9.9	+0.6
Majority		800	35.4	
Turnout		2,263	35.9	
Registered electors		6,294		
Labour gain from Conservative		Swing		

=== Kingsbrook ===
Kingsbrook
Party	Candidate	Votes	%	±%
Labour	Frank Garrick*	1,248	75.1	+17.0
Conservative	L. Griffin	228	13.7	–15.5
Liberal Democrats	Charles Parsons	186	11.2	–1.6
Majority		1,020	61.4	
Turnout		1,662	33.7	
Registered electors		4,936		
Labour hold		Swing		

=== Putnoe ===
Putnoe
Party	Candidate	Votes	%	±%
Liberal Democrats	Ian Hedley*	1,323	59.7	+12.6
Conservative	Paul Sinclair	540	24.4	–22.0
Labour	Siamak Vakilpour	352	15.9	+9.3
Majority		783	35.3	
Turnout		2,215	40.8	
Registered electors		5,429		
Liberal Democrats hold		Swing		

=== Queens Park ===
Queens Park
Party	Candidate	Votes	%	±%
Labour	Muhammad Khan*	1,514	73.2	+18.3
Conservative	D. Mitchell	289	14.0	−16.9
Liberal Democrats	Joanna Wood	266	12.9	−1.4
Majority		1,225	59.2	
Turnout		2,069	35.2	
Registered electors		5,770		
Labour hold		Swing		

=== Sharnbrook ===
Sharnbrook
Party	Candidate	Votes	%	±%
Conservative	Robert Pearson*	444	44.9	–19.3
Labour	Anthea Cooke	315	31.9	+11.4
Liberal Democrats	Christopher Hall	124	12.5	–2.9
Green	E. Thompson	106	10.7	N/A
Majority		129	13.0	
Turnout		989	48.4	
Registered electors		2,042		
Conservative hold		Swing		

=== Wootton ===
Wootton
Party	Candidate	Votes	%	±%
Independent	Mark Smith	494	28.3	N/A
Conservative	David Reedman	432	24.7	–31.2
Labour	Adrien Beardmore	411	23.5	−9.3
Liberal Democrats	Judith Cunningham	411	23.5	+12.2
Majority		62	3.5	
Turnout		1,748	44.9	
Registered electors		3,886		
Independent gain from Conservative		Swing		
