= 1995 Wansbeck District Council election =

1995 UK local government election

An election for the Wansbeck District Council was held on 4 May 1995. The Labour Party took all of the 46 seats, and therefore maintained control of the council. Turnout was 37.4%.

== Election result ==
Wansbeck local election result 1995
Party	Seats	Gains	Losses	Net gain/loss	Seats %	Votes %	Votes	+/−
Labour	46				100.0	65.6		+11.8
Liberal Democrats	0				0.0	32.7		-7.4
Conservative	0				0.0	1.8		-4.5

== See also ==
- Wansbeck District Council elections
