= 1995 Wyre Borough Council election =

Election

- 4 May 1995

All 56 seats to Wyre Borough Council 28 seats needed for a majority

	First party	Second party	Third party
Party	Conservative	Labour	Liberal Democrats
Last election	32	17	5
Seats won	19	31	4
Seat change	▼13	▲14	▼1
	Fourth party	Fifth party
Party	Residents	Independent
Last election	1	1
Seats won	2	0
Seat change	▲1	▼1
Leader before election
Conservative
Leader after election
Labour

The 1995 Wyre Borough Council election took place on 4 May 1995. This election was held on the same day as the 1995 United Kingdom local elections.

== Summary ==
The Conservatives retained control but with a much-reduced majority as Labour made substantial gains.

=== Election result ===
1995 Wyre Borough Council
Party	Candidates	Seats	Gains	Losses	Net gain/loss	Seats %	Votes %	Votes	+/−
Conservative	45	19	1	14	▼13				
Labour	45	31	14	0	▲14				
Liberal Democrats	8	4	1	2	▼1				
Residents	2	2	1	0	▲1				
Independent	3	0	0	1	▼1				

== Ward Results ==
=== Bailey ===
Bailey (3 seats)
Party	Candidate	Votes	%	±%
Labour	Colby M. Ms.*	874	54.7	
Labour	Grunshaw C.*	859		
Labour	Smith R.	757		
Conservative	Hamer M.	724	45.3	
Turnout		3,214	42.2	
Labour hold				
Labour hold				
Labour hold				

=== Bourne ===
Bourne (3 seats)
Party	Candidate	Votes	%	±%
Labour	Dawkins A.*	1,236	59.4	
Labour	Jackson J. Ms.*	1,217		
Labour	Condron J.	1,175		
Conservative	Croft T.*	846	40.6	
Conservative	Amos R. Ms.	715		
Conservative	Moorhouse D.	711		
Turnout		5,900	39.8	
Labour gain from Conservative				
Labour hold				
Labour hold				

=== Breck ===
Breck (2 seats)
Party	Candidate	Votes	%	±%
Conservative	Taylor H.*	698	52.3	
Conservative	Carroll F.	643		
Labour	Fail J.	637	47.7	
Labour	Jones W.	592		
Turnout		2,570	46.5	
Conservative hold				
Conservative hold				

=== Brock ===
Brock (1 seat)
Party	Candidate	Votes	%	±%
Conservative	Tomlinson S. Ms.	337	63.5	
Liberal Democrats	Hooson H. Ms.	194	36.5	
Turnout		531	41.5	
Conservative hold				

=== Calder ===
Calder (1 seat)
Party	Candidate	Votes	%	±%
Liberal Democrats	Rogers J.	291	52.6	
Conservative	Ibison T.*	262	47.4	
Turnout		553	45.0	
Liberal Democrats gain from Conservative				

=== Carleton ===
Carleton (2 seats)
Party	Candidate	Votes	%	±%
Labour	Walker A.	889	53.5	
Labour	Levey M. Ms.	823		
Conservative	Ward J.*	774	46.5	
Conservative	Hitchen D.	714		
Turnout		3,200	43.7	
Labour gain from Conservative				
Labour gain from Conservative				

=== Catterall ===
Catterall (1 seat)
Party	Candidate	Votes	%	±%
Liberal Democrats	Sharples D.*	721	86.2	
Conservative	Newham Z. Ms.	115	13.8	
Turnout		836	55.0	
Liberal Democrats hold				

=== Cleveleys Park ===
Cleveleys Park (3 seats)
Party	Candidate	Votes	%	±%
Labour	Oxley D.*	1,158	66.5	
Labour	Traynor J.*	1,008		
Labour	Steel P. Ms.	998		
Conservative	Simpson D.	584	33.5	
Turnout		3,748	44.7	
Labour hold				
Labour hold				
Labour gain from Conservative				

=== Duchy ===
Duchy (1 seat)
Party	Candidate	Votes	%	±%
Labour	Crouch T.	329	41.0	
Independent	Simpson I.*	290	36.2	
Conservative	Cunliffe K.	183	22.8	
Turnout		802	50.3	
Labour gain from Liberal Democrats				

=== Garstang ===
Garstang (2 seats)
Party	Candidate	Votes	%	±%
Liberal Democrats	Sharrock R.*	858	56.8	
Liberal Democrats	Harrison P.	700		
Conservative	Rogers J.	653	43.2	
Conservative	Balmain T.	543		
Turnout		2,754	44.1	
Liberal Democrats hold				
Liberal Democrats hold				

=== Great Eccleston ===
Great Eccleston (1 seat)
Party	Candidate	Votes	%	±%
Conservative	Coop A.	525	51.9	
Liberal Democrats	Graddon J.	486	48.1	
Turnout		1,011	43.7	
Conservative hold				

=== Hambleton ===
Hambleton (2 seats)
Party	Candidate	Votes	%	±%
Labour	Cameron R.	772	51.6	
Conservative	Pimbley T.*	723	48.4	
Conservative	Ridehalgh B.	675		
Turnout		2,170	40.1	
Labour gain from Conservative				
Conservative hold				

=== Hardhorn ===
Hardhorn (2 seats)
Party	Candidate	Votes	%	±%
Conservative	Cocker G.	962	72.8	
Conservative	Bailey A.*	941		
Labour	Davies N.	360	27.2	
Labour	Hogston S. Ms.	334		
Turnout		2,597	53.8	
Conservative hold				
Conservative hold				

=== High Cross ===
High Cross (2 seats)
Party	Candidate	Votes	%	±%
Conservative	Catlow P. Ms.*	839	54.5	
Conservative	Richardson M.*	817		
Labour	Robert A.	701	45.5	
Labour	Bailey G.	639		
Turnout		2,996	59.3	
Conservative hold				
Conservative hold				

=== Jubilee ===
Jubilee (2 seats)
Party	Candidate	Votes	%	±%
Residents	Roberts G.*	799	47.0	
Labour	Lees T.	519	30.5	
Labour	Traynor J. Ms.	496		
Conservative	Roberts N.*	381	22.4	
Turnout		2,195	42.4	
Residents hold				
Labour gain from Conservative				

=== Mount ===
Mount (2 seats)
Party	Candidate	Votes	%	±%
Labour	Anyon R.*	725	78.0	
Labour	Fisher C.*	686		
Conservative	Watthey J. Ms.	204	22.0	
Turnout		1,615	34.4	
Labour hold				
Labour hold				

=== Norcross ===
Norcross (2 seats)
Party	Candidate	Votes	%	±%
Labour	Pacey-Patrick E. Ms.	602	44.5	
Conservative	Jolley L.*	598	44.2	
Conservative	Wright A. Ms.	597		
Labour	Smith P.	569		
Liberal Democrats	Graham F. Ms.	153	11.3	
Turnout		2,519	45.2	
Labour gain from Conservative				
Conservative hold				

=== Park ===
Park (3 seats)
Party	Candidate	Votes	%	±%
Labour	Allen R.*	956	77.1	
Labour	Leadbetter S.*	855		
Labour	Horrocks G.*	784		
Conservative	Cooke G.	284	22.9	
Turnout		2,879	34.1	
Labour hold				
Labour hold				
Labour hold				

=== Pharos ===
Pharos (2 seats)
Party	Candidate	Votes	%	±%
Labour	Patchett A. Ms.*	685	54.6	
Labour	Hall A. Ms.	616		
Independent	Gregson-Barlow M. Ms.*	305	24.3	
Conservative	Vincent K. Ms.	264	21.1	
Turnout		1,870	43.0	
Labour hold				
Labour gain from Independent				

=== Pilling ===
Pilling (1 seat)
Party	Candidate	Votes	%	±%
Conservative	Lawrenson D.	382	67.7	
Labour	Baker R.	182	32.3	
Turnout		564	32.9	
Conservative hold				

=== Preesall ===
Preesall (3 seats)
Party	Candidate	Votes	%	±%
Conservative	Mutch J. Ms.*	1,034	50.1	
Labour	Higginson K.*	1,030	49.9	
Conservative	McCann I.*	1,028		
Labour	Baker L. Ms.	938		
Labour	Ainsworth C. Ms.	928		
Conservative	Green T.	900		
Turnout		4,858	51.1	
Conservative hold				
Labour hold				
Conservative hold				

=== Rossall ===
Rossall (3 seats)
Party	Candidate	Votes	%	±%
Labour	Aspden J.	939	58.5	
Labour	Riley V.	932		
Labour	Leadbetter I. Ms.	910		
Conservative	King H.*	665	41.5	
Conservative	Walker K. Ms.*	602		
Conservative	Vincent A.	572		
Turnout		4,620	44.4	
Labour gain from Conservative				
Labour gain from Conservative				
Labour gain from Conservative				

=== Staina ===
Staina (3 seats)
Party	Candidate	Votes	%	±%
Residents	Black J. Ms.*	1,279	44.6	
Labour	Ryder B.	803	28.0	
Conservative	Lawrenson R.*	784	27.4	
Labour	Hoyer A. Ms.	717		
Conservative	Simpson J.*	711		
Turnout		4,294	47.4	
Residents gain from Conservative				
Labour gain from Conservative				
Conservative hold				

=== Tithebarn ===
Tithebarn (2 seats)
Party	Candidate	Votes	%	±%
Conservative	Hawley P.*	707	53.1	
Conservative	Bannister D.	702		
Labour	Stubbs D.	624	46.9	
Labour	Wilby E. Ms.	546		
Turnout		2,579	47.4	
Conservative hold				
Conservative hold				

=== Victoria ===
Victoria (3 seats)
Party	Candidate	Votes	%	±%
Labour	Williams D.	944	57.8	
Conservative	Grime J.*	689	42.2	
Conservative	Preston S. Ms.*	685		
Conservative	Travis B.*	648		
Turnout		2,966	43.0	
Labour gain from Conservative				
Conservative hold				
Conservative hold				

=== Warren ===
Warren (3 seats)
Party	Candidate	Votes	%	±%
Labour	Anderton M. Ms.*	1,036	54.3	
Labour	Butler I.*	999		
Labour	Irish G.*	803		
Conservative	Barrowclough D.	454	23.8	
Conservative	Bywater P.	433		
Independent	Swarbrick D.	419	21.9	
Turnout		4,144	42.0	
Labour hold				
Labour hold				
Labour hold				

=== Wyresdale ===
Wyresdale (1 seat)
Party	Candidate	Votes	%	±%
Conservative	Collinson R.	425	60.4	
Liberal Democrats	Gaunt A.	279	39.6	
Turnout		704	49.0	
Conservative gain from Liberal Democrats				
