= 1995 Welwyn Hatfield District Council election =

Welwyn Hatfield District Council election

The 1995 Welwyn Hatfield District Council election took place on 4 May 1995 to elect members of Welwyn Hatfield District Council in England. This was on the same day as other local elections.

== Summary ==
=== Election result ===
1995 Welwyn Hatfield District Council election
Party	This election			Full council			This election		
Party	Seats	Net	Seats %	Other	Total	Total %	Votes	Votes %	+/−
Labour	11	▲3	68.8	16	27	57.4	15,566	51.5	+5.8
Conservative	5	▼3	31.3	15	20	42.6	9,922	32.8	–3.5
Liberal Democrats	0	Steady	0.0	0	0	0.0	4,261	14.1	–3.5
Independent	0	Steady	0.0	0	0	0.0	457	1.5	+1.1
