= Wansbeck District Council elections =

Local government elections in Northumberland, England

Wansbeck District Council elections were generally held every four years between the council's creation in 1974 and its abolition in 2009. Wansbeck District was a non-metropolitan district in Northumberland, England. The council was abolished and its functions transferred to Northumberland County Council with effect from 1 April 2009.

== Political control ==
The first election to the council was held in 1973, initially operating as a shadow authority before coming into its powers on 1 April 1974. Throughout the council's existence from 1974 to 2009, Labour held a majority of the seats on the council.

Party in control	Years
Labour	1974–2009

== Council elections ==
- 1973 Wansbeck District Council election
- 1976 Wansbeck District Council election (New ward boundaries)
- 1979 Wansbeck District Council election
- 1983 Wansbeck District Council election
- 1987 Wansbeck District Council election
- 1991 Wansbeck District Council election
- 1995 Wansbeck District Council election
- 1999 Wansbeck District Council election (New ward boundaries)
- 2003 Wansbeck District Council election
- 2007 Wansbeck District Council election (New ward boundaries)

== Results maps ==
2003 results map

2007 results map

== By-election results ==
=== 1995-1999 ===
Park By-Election 2 April 1998
Party	Candidate	Votes	%	±%
Labour		296	55.8	
Liberal Democrats		217	40.9	
Conservative		17	3.2	
Majority		79	14.9	
Turnout		530	23.0	
Labour hold		Swing		

=== 1999-2003 ===
Haydon By-Election 9 May 2002
Party	Candidate	Votes	%	±%
Liberal Democrats		573	54.5	−2.6
Labour		433	41.2	−1.7
Conservative		45	4.3	+4.3
Majority		140	13.3	
Turnout		1,051	28.5	
Liberal Democrats hold		Swing		

=== 2003-2007 ===
Guide Post By-Election 11 May 2006
Party	Candidate	Votes	%	±%
Labour	Raymond Butler	457	61.4	−0.7
Liberal Democrats	Margaret Carr	202	27.2	−1.8
Conservative	Anne Elphinstone	85	11.4	+11.4
Majority		255	34.2	
Turnout		744	26.7	
Labour hold		Swing		

=== 2007-2009 ===
Ashington Central By-Election 1 May 2008
Party	Candidate	Votes	%	±%
Labour		427	50.9	+12.9
Liberal Democrats	Baber Sikander	412	49.1	+21.5
Majority		15	1.8	
Turnout		839		
Labour gain from Independent		Swing		
