= 1995 Worthing Borough Council election =

1995 English local election

- 4 May 1995

12 out of 36 seats to Worthing Borough Council 19 seats needed for a majority

	First party	Second party
Party	Liberal Democrats	Conservative
Last election	19 seats, 59.7%	17 seats, 34.7%
Seats won	9	3
Seats after	23	13
Seat change	▲4	▼4
Popular vote	15,473	10,140
Percentage	52.0%	34.1%
Swing	▼4.7%	▼0.6%
Council control before election
Liberal Democrats
Council control after election
Liberal Democrats

An election was held on 4 May 1995 to elect members of Worthing Borough Council in West Sussex, England. This was on the same day as other local elections.

== Summary ==
=== Election result ===
1995 Worthing Borough Council election
Party	This election				Full council			This election		
Party	Candidates	Seats	Net	Seats %	Other	Total	Total %	Votes	Votes %	+/−
Liberal Democrats	{{{candidates}}}	9	▲4	75.0	14	23	36.1	15,473	52.0	–4.7
Conservative	{{{candidates}}}	3	▼4	25.0	10	13	63.9	10,140	34.1	–0.6
Labour	{{{candidates}}}	0	Steady	0.0	0	0	0.0	3,902	13.1	+5.6
Green	{{{candidates}}}	0	Steady	0.0	0	0	0.0	226	0.8	–0.3

== Ward results ==
=== Broadwater ===
Broadwater
Party	Candidate	Votes	%	±%
Liberal Democrats	A. Clare*	1,412	68.7	–5.0
Conservative	Z. Woolger	362	17.6	–0.3
Labour	D. White	282	13.7	+5.3
Majority		1,050	51.1	–4.6
Turnout		2,056	32.1	–5.7
Registered electors		6,403		
Liberal Democrats hold		Swing	▼2.4	

=== Castle ===
Castle
Party	Candidate	Votes	%	±%
Liberal Democrats	S. Pye*	1,242	52.4	–6.9
Labour	D. Sartin	583	24.6	+10.8
Conservative	M. McCarthy	546	23.0	–3.9
Majority		659	27.8	–4.6
Turnout		2,371	39.5	–3.8
Registered electors		6,002		
Liberal Democrats hold		Swing	▼8.9	

=== Central ===
Central
Party	Candidate	Votes	%	±%
Liberal Democrats	I. Stuart*	1,105	58.6	+2.5
Conservative	A. Hunter	492	26.1	–7.0
Labour	J. Hammond	290	15.4	+7.8
Majority		613	32.5	+9.5
Turnout		1,887	34.1	–4.8
Registered electors		5,558		
Liberal Democrats hold		Swing	▲4.8	

=== Durrington ===
Durrington
Party	Candidate	Votes	%	±%
Liberal Democrats	C. Sargent	1,646	58.5	–1.5
Conservative	C. Wells	769	27.3	–4.2
Labour	K. Fisher	397	14.1	+8.4
Majority		877	31.2	+2.7
Turnout		2,812	37.0	–3.2
Registered electors		7,624		
Liberal Democrats gain from Conservative		Swing	▲1.4	

=== Gaisford ===
Gaisford
Party	Candidate	Votes	%	±%
Liberal Democrats	P. Bennett*	1,348	61.5	+1.0
Conservative	F. Green	532	24.3	–5.7
Labour	C. Tempest	254	11.6	+5.4
Green	J. Baker	57	2.6	–0.8
Majority		816	37.2	+6.7
Turnout		2,191	34.4	–8.6
Registered electors		6,381		
Liberal Democrats hold		Swing	▲3.4	

=== Goring ===
Goring
Party	Candidate	Votes	%	±%
Conservative	B. Lynn*	1,663	49.4	+2.7
Liberal Democrats	B. Earl	1,381	41.0	–7.7
Labour	O. Rand	279	8.3	+3.7
Green	R. Baines	44	1.3	N/A
Majority		282	8.4	N/A
Turnout		3,367	50.4	–1.3
Registered electors		6,692		
Conservative hold		Swing	▲5.2	

=== Heene ===
Heene
Party	Candidate	Votes	%	±%
Conservative	T. Dice	1,171	50.4	+1.7
Liberal Democrats	I. Richards	767	33.0	–9.5
Labour	K. Smith	329	14.2	+5.3
Green	S. Colgate	56	2.4	N/A
Majority		404	17.4	+11.2
Turnout		2,323	37.0	±0.0
Registered electors		6,298		
Conservative hold		Swing	▲5.6	

=== Marine ===
Marine
Party	Candidate	Votes	%	±%
Conservative	G. Lissenburg	1,316	46.6	+2.1
Liberal Democrats	N. Bull	1,132	40.0	–1.2
Labour	N. Michica	310	11.0	+0.6
Green	L. Colkett	69	2.4	–1.5
Majority		184	6.5	+3.2
Turnout		2,827	45.4	+2.0
Registered electors		6,233		
Conservative hold		Swing	▲1.7	

=== Offington ===
Offington
Party	Candidate	Votes	%	±%
Liberal Democrats	J. Doyle	1,269	46.6	–8.4
Conservative	R. Green	1,241	45.5	+5.4
Labour	J. Gardiner	215	7.9	+3.0
Majority		28	1.0	–13.9
Turnout		2,725	44.5	–5.9
Registered electors		6,133		
Liberal Democrats gain from Conservative		Swing	▼6.9	

=== Salvington ===
Salvington
Party	Candidate	Votes	%	±%
Liberal Democrats	S. Player	1,263	46.9	–3.7
Conservative	H. Braden	1,118	41.5	–2.9
Labour	J. Wicks	313	11.6	+6.6
Majority		145	5.4	–0.9
Turnout		2,694	41.9	–5.1
Registered electors		6,439		
Liberal Democrats gain from Conservative		Swing	▼0.4	

=== Selden ===
Selden
Party	Candidate	Votes	%	±%
Liberal Democrats	C. Brown	1,327	63.4	–2.0
Conservative	A. Craig	450	21.5	–2.7
Labour	R. White	315	15.1	+4.8
Majority		877	41.9	+0.7
Turnout		2,092	35.0	–5.2
Registered electors		5,996		
Liberal Democrats gain from Conservative		Swing	▲0.4	

=== Tarring ===
Tarring
Party	Candidate	Votes	%	±%
Liberal Democrats	J. Lovell	1,581	66.0	–5.1
Conservative	J. Smith	480	20.0	–2.0
Labour	D. Johnson	335	14.0	+7.1
Majority		1,101	46.0	–3.0
Turnout		2,396	37.2	–4.5
Registered electors		6,454		
Liberal Democrats hold		Swing	▼1.6	
