= 1995 St Albans City and District Council election =

St Albans City and District Council election

The 1995 St Albans City and District Council election took place on 4 May 1995 to elect members of St Albans City and District Council in England. This was on the same day as other local elections.

== Election result ==
1995 St Albans City and District Council election
Party	This election			Full council			This election		
Party	Seats	Net	Seats %	Other	Total	Total %	Votes	Votes %	+/−
Liberal Democrats	13	▲5	68.4	21	34	59.6	16,654	41.8	-8.0
Conservative	2	▼6	10.5	11	13	22.8	10,379	26.0	+2.9
Labour	4	▲1	21.1	6	10	17.5	12,459	31.2	+5.9
Independent	0	0	0.0	0	0	0.0	241	0.6	-0.2
Green	0	0	0.0	0	0	0.0	124	0.3	-0.7
Natural Law	0	0	0.0	0	0	0.0	27	0.1	New

== Ward results ==
=== Ashley ===
Ashley
Party	Candidate	Votes	%	±%
Labour	M. Pakenham	1,059	45.6	+10.2
Liberal Democrats	C. Bradley	974	41.9	–9.8
Conservative	D. Caroline	289	12.4	–0.5
Majority		85	3.7	N/A
Turnout		2,322	46.8	–5.4
Registered electors		4,965		
Labour gain from Liberal Democrats		Swing	▲10.0	

=== Batchwood ===
Batchwood
Party	Candidate	Votes	%	±%
Labour	A. Rose*	1,284	66.5	+5.9
Liberal Democrats	R. Law	371	19.2	–5.2
Conservative	R. Langham	229	11.9	–3.0
Green	A. Cripps	47	2.4	N/A
Majority		913	47.3	+11.1
Turnout		1,931	40.4	–4.8
Registered electors		4,781		
Labour hold		Swing	▲5.6	

=== Clarence ===
Clarence
Party	Candidate	Votes	%	±%
Liberal Democrats	J. Lusby	1,000	53.7	–7.8
Labour	D. Pratley	515	27.7	+9.3
Conservative	J. Christie	347	18.6	+1.8
Majority		485	26.0	–17.1
Turnout		1,862	43.0	–7.4
Registered electors		4,332		
Liberal Democrats hold		Swing	▼8.6	

=== Cunningham ===
Cunningham
Party	Candidate	Votes	%	±%
Liberal Democrats	R. Donald*	1,142	55.0	–5.7
Labour	A. Gilson	653	31.4	+6.6
Conservative	M. Elsdon	282	13.6	–0.9
Majority		489	23.5	–12.4
Turnout		2,077	43.7	–3.5
Registered electors		4,758		
Liberal Democrats hold		Swing	▼6.2	

=== Harpenden East ===
Harpenden East
Party	Candidate	Votes	%	±%
Liberal Democrats	P. Waddilove	1,095	50.1	–10.1
Conservative	D. Fisher	630	28.8	+2.0
Labour	D. Crew	462	21.1	+8.1
Majority		465	21.3	–12.1
Turnout		2,187	43.7	–8.0
Registered electors		5,009		
Liberal Democrats hold		Swing	▼6.1	

=== Harpenden North ===
Harpenden North
Party	Candidate	Votes	%	±%
Liberal Democrats	T. Glenister	1,052	46.1	–6.3
Conservative	A. Pawle	729	31.9	–1.1
Labour	E. Rayner	474	20.8	+6.2
Natural Law	P. Saunders	27	1.2	N/A
Majority		323	14.2	–5.3
Turnout		2,282	39.4	–6.3
Registered electors		5,792		
Liberal Democrats gain from Conservative		Swing	▲2.6	

=== Harpenden South ===
Harpenden South
Party	Candidate	Votes	%	±%
Conservative	P. Johnston*	1,058	43.7	+1.9
Liberal Democrats	G. Mitchell	1,015	41.9	–6.9
Labour	K. Holmes	347	14.3	+4.9
Majority		43	1.8	N/A
Turnout		2,420	46.0	–6.1
Registered electors		5,256		
Conservative hold		Swing	▲4.4	

=== Harpenden West ===
Harpenden West
Party	Candidate	Votes	%	±%
Conservative	D. Coe*	1,116	48.6	+4.8
Liberal Democrats	A. Steer	875	38.1	–7.2
Labour	J. Thompson	306	13.3	+2.4
Majority		241	10.5	N/A
Turnout		2,297	44.9	–2.0
Registered electors		5,121		
Conservative hold		Swing	▲6.0	

=== London Colney ===
London Colney
Party	Candidate	Votes	%	±%
Labour	E. Gordon*	1,380	74.8	+6.5
Liberal Democrats	K. Lambert	207	11.2	–1.0
Conservative	M. Shaw	180	9.8	–5.8
Green	M. Gibson	77	4.2	+0.3
Majority		1,173	63.6	+10.9
Turnout		1,844	32.5	–8.0
Registered electors		5,667		
Labour hold		Swing	▲3.8	

=== Marshallwick North ===
Marshallwick North
Party	Candidate	Votes	%	±%
Liberal Democrats	T. Clegg	1,220	60.5	–5.6
Conservative	V. Holley	427	21.2	+1.3
Labour	W. Preston	371	18.4	+4.4
Majority		793	39.3	–7.0
Turnout		2,018	42.6	–6.0
Registered electors		4,741		
Liberal Democrats hold		Swing	▼3.5	

=== Marshallwick South ===
Marshallwick South
Party	Candidate	Votes	%	±%
Liberal Democrats	P. Burton*	1,240	52.3	–5.4
Conservative	P. Farley	625	26.4	+2.7
Labour	M. Ewington	504	21.3	+5.9
Majority		615	26.0	–8.0
Turnout		2,369	45.7	–7.7
Registered electors		5,187		
Liberal Democrats hold		Swing	▼4.1	

No Green candidate as previous (3.2%).

=== Park Street ===
Park Street
Party	Candidate	Votes	%	±%
Liberal Democrats	K. Finley*	893	55.4	–5.8
Labour	M. Morley	429	26.6	+6.2
Conservative	I. Gibb	289	17.9	–0.5
Majority		464	28.8	–12.0
Turnout		1,611	36.4	–4.5
Registered electors		4,420		
Liberal Democrats hold		Swing	▼6.0	

=== Redbourn ===
Redbourn
Party	Candidate	Votes	%	±%
Liberal Democrats	E. Humbles	776	41.8	–26.3
Conservative	B. Chapman*	714	38.4	N/A
Labour	M. Brennan	367	19.8	+6.7
Majority		62	3.3	–46.0
Turnout		1,857	41.7	–1.6
Registered electors		4,446		
Liberal Democrats gain from Conservative		Swing	N/A	

No Independent candidate as previous (18.8%).

=== Sandridge ===
Sandridge
Party	Candidate	Votes	%	±%
Liberal Democrats	W. Morris	641	38.6	+22.9
Conservative	C. Whiteside*	514	30.9	–15.6
Labour	A. Cooper	308	18.5	+8.6
Independent	B. Filmer	199	12.0	–13.7
Majority		127	7.6	N/A
Turnout		1,662	43.0	–1.6
Registered electors		3,865		
Liberal Democrats gain from Conservative		Swing	▲19.3	

=== Sopwell ===
Sopwell
Party	Candidate	Votes	%	±%
Labour	M. Wilson	1,498	76.0	+9.9
Liberal Democrats	I. Fowler	255	12.9	–9.9
Conservative	G. Brown	217	11.0	–0.1
Majority		1,243	63.1	+19.8
Turnout		1,970	38.8	–4.4
Registered electors		5,074		
Labour hold		Swing	0.0	

=== St. Peters ===
St. Peters
Party	Candidate	Votes	%	±%
Liberal Democrats	J. Gunner*	1,005	47.8	–5.9
Labour	L. Warren	876	41.7	+10.5
Conservative	L. Harris	222	10.6	–0.7
Majority		129	6.1	–16.4
Turnout		2,103	43.2	–6.1
Registered electors		4,868		
Liberal Democrats hold		Swing	▼8.2	

No Green candidate as previous (3.8%).

=== St. Stephens ===
St. Stephens
Party	Candidate	Votes	%	±%
Liberal Democrats	J. Baillie	1,006	42.1	–3.9
Conservative	A. Nowell*	798	33.4	–0.5
Labour	P. Allen	585	24.5	+4.5
Majority		208	8.7	–3.4
Turnout		2,389	40.1	–8.2
Registered electors		5,963		
Liberal Democrats gain from Conservative		Swing	▼1.7	

=== Verulam ===
Verulam
Party	Candidate	Votes	%	±%
Liberal Democrats	K. Morris	977	38.9	–1.4
Conservative	J. Smith*	957	38.1	+5.7
Labour	J. Bellchambers	537	21.4	–1.7
Independent	A. Brown	42	1.7	N/A
Majority		20	0.8	–7.1
Turnout		2,513	48.2	–4.9
Registered electors		5,219		
Liberal Democrats gain from Conservative		Swing	▼3.6	

No Green candidate as previous (4.2%).

=== Wheathampstead ===
Wheathampstead
Party	Candidate	Votes	%	±%
Liberal Democrats	G. Webster	910	41.9	–14.7
Conservative	D. Hills*	756	34.8	+4.0
Labour	P. Woodhams	504	23.2	+10.7
Majority		154	7.1	–18.7
Turnout		2,170	45.7	–8.1
Registered electors		4,744		
Liberal Democrats gain from Conservative		Swing	▼9.4	
