= 1995 Waveney District Council election =

1995 English local government election

- 4 May 1995

All 48 seats to Waveney District Council 25 seats needed for a majority

	First party	Second party	Third party
Party	Labour	Conservative	Liberal Democrats
Seats won	14	0	0
Seats after	36	10	2
Seat change	▲9	▼7	▼2
Popular vote	19,116	7,337	4,424
Percentage	61.9%	23.8%	14.3%
Swing	▲0.8%	▲2.0%	▼1.8%
- Winner of each seat at the 1995 Waveney District Council election.
Control before election
Labour
Control after election
Labour

The 1995 Waveney District Council election took place on 4 May 1995 to elect members of Waveney District Council in Suffolk, England. This was on the same day as other local elections.

== Summary ==
=== Election result ===
1995 Waveney District Council election
Party	This election			Full council			This election		
Party	Seats	Net	Seats %	Other	Total	Total %	Votes	Votes %	+/−
Labour	14	▲9	100.0	22	36	75.0	19,116	61.9	+0.8
Conservative	0	▼7	0.0	10	10	20.8	7,337	23.8	+2.0
Liberal Democrats	0	▼2	0.0	2	2	4.2	4,424	14.3	–1.8

== Ward results ==
Incumbent councillors standing for re-election are marked with an asterisk (*). Changes in seats do not take into account by-elections or defections.

=== Beccles Town ===
Beccles Town
Party	Candidate	Votes	%	±%
Labour	P. Whatling	1,118	45.0	
Liberal Democrats	E. Crisp*	943	38.0	
Conservative	P. Sanders	422	17.0	
Majority		175	7.0	
Turnout		2,483	43.2	
Registered electors		5,742		
Labour gain from Liberal Democrats		Swing		

=== Beccles Worlingham ===
Beccles Worlingham
Party	Candidate	Votes	%	±%
Labour	H. Ley*	1,080	64.8	
Conservative	K. Niblett	394	23.6	
Liberal Democrats	P. Cunningham	193	11.6	
Majority		686	41.2	
Turnout		1,667	41.5	
Registered electors		4,010		
Labour hold		Swing		

=== Blything ===
Blything
Party	Candidate	Votes	%	±%
Labour	J. Thomas	444	53.5	
Conservative	M. Nichols*	386	46.5	
Majority		58	7.0	
Turnout		830	48.1	
Registered electors		1,731		
Labour gain from Conservative		Swing		

=== Bungay ===
Bungay
Party	Candidate	Votes	%	±%
Labour	O. Parr	842	45.7	
Conservative	J. Palin*	666	36.2	
Liberal Democrats	D. O'Neill	334	18.1	
Majority		176	9.5	
Turnout		1,842	49.0	
Registered electors		3,746		
Labour gain from Conservative		Swing		

=== Carlton ===
Carlton
Party	Candidate	Votes	%	±%
Labour	G. Gouldby	1,470	59.3	
Conservative	N. Brighouse*	698	28.1	
Liberal Democrats	C. Thomas	313	12.6	
Majority		772	31.2	
Turnout		2,481	39.7	
Registered electors		6,224		
Labour gain from Conservative		Swing		

=== Gunton ===
Gunton
Party	Candidate	Votes	%	±%
Labour	G. Stewart	1,096	55.0	
Conservative	T. Wright	660	33.1	
Liberal Democrats	B. Howe	237	11.9	
Majority		436	21.9	
Turnout		1,993	38.3	
Registered electors		5,156		
Labour gain from Conservative		Swing		

=== Halesworth ===
Halesworth
Party	Candidate	Votes	%	±%
Labour	H. Holzer*	1,174	66.9	
Conservative	R. Niblett	478	27.2	
Liberal Democrats	S. Tonge	103	5.9	
Majority		696	39.7	
Turnout		1,755	47.7	
Registered electors		3,659		
Labour hold		Swing		

=== Harbour ===
Harbour
Party	Candidate	Votes	%	±%
Labour	J. Reynolds*	1,034	79.7	
Conservative	M. Bee	156	12.0	
Liberal Democrats	D. Randoll	108	8.3	
Majority		878	67.6	
Turnout		1,298	30.6	
Registered electors		4,168		
Labour hold		Swing		

=== Kirkley ===
Kirkley
Party	Candidate	Votes	%	±%
Labour	I. Walpole	1,004	51.2	
Liberal Democrats	A. Shepherd*	797	40.6	
Conservative	M. Regester	160	8.2	
Majority		207	10.6	
Turnout		1,961	43.0	
Registered electors		4,515		
Labour gain from Liberal Democrats		Swing		

=== Lothingland ===
Lothingland
Party	Candidate	Votes	%	±%
Labour	A. Lewars	1,176	52.7	
Conservative	A. Choveaux*	546	24.5	
Liberal Democrats	P. Mummery	509	22.8	
Majority		630	28.2	
Turnout		2,231	47.5	
Registered electors		4,682		
Labour gain from Conservative		Swing		

=== Normanston ===
Normanston
Party	Candidate	Votes	%	±%
Labour	P. Hunt*	1,247	88.1	
Conservative	S. Ames	168	11.9	
Majority		1,079	76.3	
Turnout		1,415	31.9	
Registered electors		4,379		
Labour hold		Swing		

=== Oulton Broad ===
Oulton Broad
Party	Candidate	Votes	%	±%
Labour	J. Hinton	1,279	56.5	
Conservative	M. Barnard*	675	29.8	
Liberal Democrats	A. Tibbitt	310	13.7	
Majority		604	26.7	
Turnout		2,264	41.8	
Registered electors		5,313		
Labour gain from Conservative		Swing		

=== Pakefield ===
Pakefield
Party	Candidate	Votes	%	±%
Labour	R. Blizzard*	1,875	74.2	
Conservative	F. Gaimster	400	15.8	
Liberal Democrats	D. Young	251	9.9	
Majority		1,475	58.4	
Turnout		2,526	45.1	
Registered electors		5,518		
Labour hold		Swing		

=== Southwold ===
Southwold
Party	Candidate	Votes	%	±%
Labour	J. Punter	1,170	47.6	
Conservative	P. Austin	1,092	44.4	
Liberal Democrats	A. Martin	198	8.0	
Majority		78	3.2	
Turnout		2,460	47.6	
Registered electors		5,117		
Labour gain from Conservative		Swing		

=== St. Margarets ===
St. Margarets
Party	Candidate	Votes	%	±%
Labour	D. Rouse	1,648	85.0	
Conservative	A. Mylan	291	15.0	
Majority		1,357	70.0	
Turnout		1,939	35.0	
Registered electors		5,470		
Labour hold		Swing		

=== Whitton ===
Whitton
Party	Candidate	Votes	%	±%
Labour	T. Chipperfield*	1,459	84.2	
Conservative	F. Canham	145	8.4	
Liberal Democrats	G. Strachan	128	7.4	
Majority		1,314	75.9	
Turnout		1,732	38.3	
Registered electors		4,387		
Labour hold		Swing		

== By-elections ==
=== Harbour ===
Harbour by-election: 19 October 1995
Party	Candidate	Votes	%	±%
Labour		670	77.5	
Liberal Democrats		95	11.0	
Conservative		100	11.6	
Majority		570	65.9	
Turnout		865	20.7	
Registered electors		4,179		
Labour hold		Swing		
