= 1995 Preston Borough Council election =

1995 UK local government election

The 1995 Preston Borough Council election for the Preston Borough Council was held in May 1995 alongside other local elections across the United Kingdom. One third of the council was up for election.

== Ashton ==
Preston City Council Elections: Ashton Ward
Party	Candidate	Votes	%	±%
Conservative	M Routledge	1,137	50.11	
Labour	A Milne-Picken	918	40.46	
Liberal Democrats	M Forde	214	9.43	

== Avenham ==
Preston City Council Elections: Avenham Ward
Party	Candidate	Votes	%	±%
Labour	Y Patel	1,077	68.12	
Liberal Democrats	S Hall	274	17.33	
Conservative	C Taylor	230	14.55	

== Brookfield ==
Preston City Council Elections: Brookfield Ward
Party	Candidate	Votes	%	±%
Labour	J Saksena	893	72.31	
Conservative	J Balshaw	212	17.17	
Liberal Democrats	M Middleton	130	10.53	

== Cadley ==
Preston City Council Elections: Cadley Ward
Party	Candidate	Votes	%	±%
Liberal Democrats	Michael Onyon	1,510	63.00	
Conservative	A Bentham	602	25.11	
Labour	P Malliband	285	11.89	

== Central ==
Preston City Council Elections: Central Ward
Party	Candidate	Votes	%	±%
Labour	D Barton	1,104	64.37	
Liberal Democrats	A Yusuf	373	21.75	
Conservative	P Hammond	238	13.88	

== Deepdale ==
Preston City Council Elections: Deepdale Ward
Party	Candidate	Votes	%	±%
Labour	A Campbell	1,178	58.37	
Liberal Democrats	Y Zinga	607	30.08	
Conservative	A Croft	233	11.55	

== Fishwick ==
Preston City Council Elections: Fishwick Ward
Party	Candidate	Votes	%	±%
Labour	I Hall	900	73.59	
Conservative	P Elliott	181	14.80	
Liberal Democrats	Wilf Gavin	142	11.61	

== Greyfriars ==
Preston City Council Elections: Greyfriars Ward
Party	Candidate	Votes	%	±%
Liberal Democrats	R Askew	1,336	47.22	
Conservative	G Haynes	1,030	42.81	
Labour	L Worrell	240	9.98	

== Ingol ==
Preston City Council Elections: Ingol Ward
Party	Candidate	Votes	%	±%
Liberal Democrats	A Green	1,001	64.41	
Labour	C Abbot	412	26.51	
Conservative	N Kelly	141	9.07	

== Larches ==
Preston City Council Elections: Larches Ward
Party	Candidate	Votes	%	±%
Labour	J Monk	824	46.92	
Liberal Democrats	J Willacy	694	39.52	
Conservative	M Gildert	238	13.55	

== Moor Park ==
Preston City Council Elections: Moor Park Ward
Party	Candidate	Votes	%	±%
Labour	Frank de Molfetta	1,130	59.79	
Conservative	J Bray	430	22.75	
Liberal Democrats	C Spencer	330	17.46	

== Preston Rural East ==
Preston City Council Elections: Rural East Ward
Party	Candidate	Votes	%	±%
Conservative	G Gates	1,299	66.92	
Labour	J Morley	322	16.59	
Liberal Democrats	Edward Rowland	320	16.49	

== Preston Rural West ==
Preston City Council Elections: Rural West Ward
Party	Candidate	Votes	%	±%
Conservative	G Wilkins	1,000	42.23	
Liberal Democrats	R Drinkall	903	38.13	
Labour	M Clegg	465	19.64	

== Ribbleton ==
Preston City Council Elections: Ribbleton Ward
Party	Candidate	Votes	%	±%
Labour	G Worrell	983	76.62	
Conservative	C Balshaw	185	14.42	
Liberal Democrats	K Rogers	115	8.96	

== Riversway ==
Preston City Council Elections: Riversway Ward
Party	Candidate	Votes	%	±%
Labour	B Ratcliffe	1,100	66.91	
Liberal Democrats	F Allinson	321	19.53	
Conservative	M Taylor	223	13.56	

== Sharoe Green ==
Preston City Council Elections: Sharoe Green Ward
Party	Candidate	Votes	%	±%
Conservative	E Fazackerley	826	42.91	
Liberal Democrats	M Turner	676	35.12	
Labour	P Woods	423	21.97	

== Sherwood ==
Preston City Council Elections: Sherwood Ward
Party	Candidate	Votes	%	±%
Conservative	M Milne	1,069	48.90	
Labour	D Eastham	631	28.87	
Liberal Democrats	Bill Shannon	486	22.23	

== St Matthews ==
Preston City Council Elections: St Matthews Ward
Party	Candidate	Votes	%	±%
Labour	R Kinsella	1,167	80.82	
Conservative	S Heys	170	11.77	
Liberal Democrats	C Fell	107	7.41	

== Tulketh ==
Preston City Council Elections: Tulketh Ward
Party	Candidate	Votes	%	±%
Labour	Jean al-Serraj	1,108	61.97	
Conservative	S Brown	452	25.28	
Liberal Democrats	J Hargreaves	228	12.75	
