= 1995 Hertsmere Borough Council election =

Local election in England

- 4 May 1995

14 out of 39 seats to Hertsmere Borough Council 20 seats needed for a majority
- Registered: 44,268
- Turnout: 41.4% (▼4.1%)

| | First party | Second party |
|---|---|---|
| Party | Labour | Conservative |
| Seats won | 12 | 1 |
| Seats after | 19 | 14 |
| Seat change | ▲4 | ▼5 |
| Popular vote | 10,524 | 5,799 |
| Percentage | 57.5% | 31.7% |
| Swing | ▲29.4% | ▼2.8% |
| | Third party | Fourth party |
| Party | Liberal Democrats | Independent |
| Seats won | 1 | 0 |
| Seats after | 5 | 1 |
| Seat change | Steady | Steady |
| Popular vote | 1,651 | 332 |
| Percentage | 9.0% | 1.8% |
| Swing | ▼22.1% | ▼4.4% |
- Winner of each seat at the 1995 Hertsmere Borough Council election. Wards in white were not contested.
Control before election
No overall control
Control after election
No overall control

The 1995 Hertsmere Borough Council election took place on 4 May 1995 to elect members of Hertsmere Borough Council in Hertfordshire, England. This was on the same day as other local elections.

== Summary ==
=== Election result ===
1995 Hertsmere Borough Council election
| Party | This election | | | | Full council | | | This election | | |
| Party | Candidates | Seats | Net | Seats % | Other | Total | Total % | Votes | Votes % | +/− |
|---|---|---|---|---|---|---|---|---|---|---|
| Labour | {{{candidates}}} | 12 | ▲5 | 85.7 | 7 | 19 | 48.7 | 10,524 | 57.5 | +29.4 |
| Conservative | {{{candidates}}} | 1 | ▼5 | 7.1 | 13 | 14 | 35.9 | 5,799 | 31.7 | –2.8 |
| Liberal Democrats | {{{candidates}}} | 1 | Steady | 7.1 | 4 | 5 | 12.8 | 1,651 | 9.0 | –22.1 |
| Independent | {{{candidates}}} | 0 | Steady | 0.0 | 1 | 1 | 2.6 | 332 | 1.8 | –4.4 |

== Ward results ==
Incumbent councillors standing for re-election are marked with an asterisk (*). Changes in seats do not take into account by-elections or defections.

=== Aldenham East ===
Aldenham East
| Party | Candidate | Votes | % | ±% |
|---|---|---|---|---|
| Conservative | S. Nagler* | 1,120 | 73.8 | +9.1 |
| Labour | G. Diaz-Prior | 398 | 26.2 | +11.9 |
| Majority | | 722 | 47.6 | +4.0 |
| Turnout | | 1,518 | 42.7 | –1.2 |
| Registered electors | | 3,614 | | |
| Conservative hold | | Swing | ▼1.4 | |

=== Aldenham West ===
Aldenham West (2 seats due to by-election)
| Party | Candidate | Votes | % | ±% |
|---|---|---|---|---|
| Labour | P. Stanley | 772 | 51.9 | +26.3 |
| Labour | P. Halsey | 768 | 51.6 | +26.0 |
| Conservative | A. Boodt | 659 | 44.3 | –14.8 |
| Conservative | B. Lewis | 649 | 43.6 | –15.5 |
| Turnout | | ~1,487 | 41.6 | +6.3 |
| Registered electors | | 3,575 | | |
| Labour gain from Conservative | | | | |
| Labour gain from Conservative | | | | |

=== Brookmeadow ===
Brookmeadow
| Party | Candidate | Votes | % | ±% |
|---|---|---|---|---|
| Labour | T. Sandle | 894 | 84.9 | +12.7 |
| Conservative | P. Brew | 159 | 15.1 | +0.2 |
| Majority | | 735 | 69.8 | +12.4 |
| Turnout | | 1,053 | 36.8 | –3.3 |
| Registered electors | | 2,864 | | |
| Labour hold | | Swing | ▲6.3 | |

=== Campions ===
Campions
| Party | Candidate | Votes | % | ±% |
|---|---|---|---|---|
| Labour | J. Nolan* | 606 | 85.8 | +12.9 |
| Conservative | H. Spratt | 100 | 14.2 | –12.9 |
| Majority | | 506 | 71.7 | +25.8 |
| Turnout | | 706 | 33.3 | –8.1 |
| Registered electors | | 2,128 | | |
| Labour hold | | Swing | ▲12.9 | |

=== Cowley ===
Cowley
| Party | Candidate | Votes | % | ±% |
|---|---|---|---|---|
| Labour | D. Hoeksma | 1,168 | 83.5 | +23.4 |
| Conservative | A. Bright | 230 | 16.5 | –13.5 |
| Majority | | 938 | 67.0 | +36.9 |
| Turnout | | 1,398 | 31.3 | +4.3 |
| Registered electors | | 4,490 | | |
| Labour hold | | Swing | ▲18.5 | |

=== Elstree ===
Elstree
| Party | Candidate | Votes | % | ±% |
|---|---|---|---|---|
| Labour | M. Heywood | 1,020 | 55.5 | +23.6 |
| Conservative | S. Quilty | 818 | 44.5 | –2.8 |
| Majority | | 202 | 11.0 | N/A |
| Turnout | | 1,838 | 35.7 | –5.2 |
| Registered electors | | 5,171 | | |
| Labour gain from Conservative | | Swing | ▲13.2 | |

=== Hillside ===
Hillside
| Party | Candidate | Votes | % | ±% |
|---|---|---|---|---|
| Labour | J. Goldberg* | 880 | 78.9 | +29.8 |
| Conservative | D. McKee | 235 | 21.1 | –17.6 |
| Majority | | 645 | 57.8 | +47.4 |
| Turnout | | 1,115 | 34.0 | –5.0 |
| Registered electors | | 3,246 | | |
| Labour hold | | Swing | ▲23.7 | |

=== Kenilworth ===
Kenilworth
| Party | Candidate | Votes | % | ±% |
|---|---|---|---|---|
| Labour | F. Ward* | 805 | 83.5 | +13.1 |
| Conservative | G. Ferguson | 159 | 16.5 | –0.5 |
| Majority | | 646 | 67.0 | +13.6 |
| Turnout | | 964 | 33.5 | –11.1 |
| Registered electors | | 2,904 | | |
| Labour hold | | Swing | ▲6.8 | |

=== Lyndhurst ===
Lyndhurst
| Party | Candidate | Votes | % | ±% |
|---|---|---|---|---|
| Labour | C. Silverstone | 783 | 77.1 | +18.9 |
| Conservative | J. Kempton | 232 | 22.9 | –13.4 |
| Majority | | 551 | 54.2 | +32.3 |
| Turnout | | 1,015 | 33.7 | –1.9 |
| Registered electors | | 3,069 | | |
| Labour hold | | Swing | ▲16.2 | |

=== Mill ===
Mill
| Party | Candidate | Votes | % | ±% |
|---|---|---|---|---|
| Liberal Democrats | M. Colne* | 1,196 | 73.4 | +2.8 |
| Labour | D. Bearfield | 253 | 15.5 | +0.1 |
| Conservative | J. Slade | 181 | 11.1 | –2.8 |
| Majority | | 943 | 57.9 | +2.7 |
| Turnout | | 1,630 | 47.6 | –1.3 |
| Registered electors | | 3,438 | | |
| Liberal Democrats hold | | Swing | ▲1.4 | |

=== Potters Bar East ===
Potters Bar East
| Party | Candidate | Votes | % | ±% |
|---|---|---|---|---|
| Labour | A. Harrison | 984 | 53.1 | +7.1 |
| Conservative | R. Calcutt | 638 | 34.4 | –1.7 |
| Liberal Democrats | P. Shannon | 231 | 12.5 | –5.4 |
| Majority | | 346 | 18.7 | +8.8 |
| Turnout | | 1,853 | 41.6 | –9.1 |
| Registered electors | | 4,468 | | |
| Labour gain from Conservative | | Swing | ▲4.4 | |

=== Potters Bar West ===
Potters Bar West
| Party | Candidate | Votes | % | ±% |
|---|---|---|---|---|
| Labour | D. Lott | 705 | 49.5 | +30.0 |
| Conservative | C. Calcutt | 496 | 34.8 | –24.7 |
| Liberal Democrats | D. Martin | 224 | 15.7 | –5.2 |
| Majority | | 209 | 14.7 | N/A |
| Turnout | | 1,425 | 43.5 | +6.5 |
| Registered electors | | 3,279 | | |
| Labour gain from Conservative | | Swing | ▲27.4 | |

=== Shenley ===
Shenley
| Party | Candidate | Votes | % | ±% |
|---|---|---|---|---|
| Labour | W. Hogan* | 488 | 51.7 | +1.5 |
| Independent | M. Braynis | 332 | 35.2 | N/A |
| Conservative | P. Banton | 123 | 13.0 | –27.6 |
| Majority | | 156 | 16.5 | +6.9 |
| Turnout | | 943 | 48.4 | –3.9 |
| Registered electors | | 2,022 | | |
| Labour hold | | | | |
