= 1995 Forest Heath District Council election =

Forest Heath District Council election

The 1995 Forest Heath District Council election took place on 4 May 1995 to elect members of Forest Heath District Council in England. This was on the same day as other local elections.

== Summary ==
1995 Forest Heath District Council election
Party	Seats	Gains	Losses	Net gain/loss	Seats %	Votes %	Votes	+/−
Conservative	10			▼2	40.0	40.0	8,143	+6.3
Liberal Democrats	6			▲3	24.0	19.9	4,056	+6.5
Independent	5			▼4	20.0	15.1	3,081	-17.1
Labour	4			▲3	16.0	24.9	5,059	+4.2
