= 1995 Luton Borough Council election =

Local election in England

- 4 May 1995

All 48 seats to Luton Borough Council 25 seats needed for a majority

	First party	Second party	Third party
Party	Labour	Liberal Democrats	Conservative
Seats won	37	9	2
Seat change	▲9	Steady	▼9
Popular vote	68,402	24,444	26,922
Percentage	55.7%	19.9%	21.9%
Swing	▲12.7%	▼0.3%	▼13.9%
Control before election
Labour
Control after election
Labour

The 1995 Luton Borough Council election took place on 4 May 1995 to elect members of Luton Borough Council in Bedfordshire, England. This was on the same day as other local elections.

== Summary ==
=== Election result ===
1995 Luton Borough Council election
Party	Candidates	Seats	Gains	Losses	Net gain/loss	Seats %	Votes %	Votes	+/−
Labour	48	37	9	0	▲9	77.1	55.7	68,402	+12.7
Liberal Democrats	48	9	0	0	Steady	18.8	19.9	24,444	–0.3
Conservative	45	2	0	9	▼9	4.2	21.9	26,922	–13.9
Independent	12	0	0	0	Steady	0.0	1.9	2,296	+1.4
Green	4	0	0	0	Steady	0.0	0.5	648	±0.0
Communist	1	0	0	0	Steady	0.0	<0.1	51	N/A

== Ward results ==
Incumbent councillors standing for re-election are marked with an asterisk (*). Changes in seats do not take into account by-elections or defections.

=== Biscot ===
Biscot (3 seats)
Party	Candidate	Votes	%	±%
Labour	M. Ali	1,954	59.7	–3.7
Labour	R. Davis*	1,934	59.1	+0.7
Labour	M. Guha*	1,842	56.3	+1.1
Conservative	M. Riaz	780	23.8	+1.4
Conservative	A. Burrett	496	15.2	–6.3
Liberal Democrats	J. Bonner	283	8.7	–1.7
Liberal Democrats	M. Malins	248	7.6	–2.3
Liberal Democrats	G. Malins	219	6.7	–1.6
Turnout		~3,271	39.3	–5.4
Registered electors		8,322		
Labour hold				
Labour hold				
Labour hold				

=== Bramingham ===
Bramingham (3 seats)
Party	Candidate	Votes	%	±%
Labour	M. Main*	1,196	43.5	+12.6
Labour	S. Deb Gupta	1,036	37.7	+9.8
Conservative	P. Glenister*	994	36.1	–13.8
Labour	A. Raja	969	35.2	+9.0
Conservative	M. Punter	944	34.3	–15.1
Conservative	K. White	881	32.0	–14.7
Liberal Democrats	M. Lincoln	487	17.7	+4.4
Liberal Democrats	M. Howes	454	16.5	+3.4
Liberal Democrats	H. Siederer	373	13.6	+3.3
Independent	J. Burgoyne	105	3.8	N/A
Independent	R. Mitchell	79	2.9	N/A
Independent	M. Willmott	68	2.5	N/A
Turnout		~2,751	29.1	–10.9
Registered electors		9,454		
Labour gain from Conservative				
Labour gain from Conservative				
Conservative hold				

=== Challney ===
Challney (3 seats)
Party	Candidate	Votes	%	±%
Labour	B. Devenish*	1,616	58.7	+16.5
Labour	R. Sills*	1,501	54.6	+14.3
Labour	W. Akbar	1,463	53.2	+17.3
Conservative	B. Dodd*	698	25.4	–15.6
Conservative	G. Campbell	585	21.3	–18.7
Conservative	R. Samuels	576	20.9	–14.5
Liberal Democrats	D. Champman	311	11.3	–0.6
Liberal Democrats	B. Lawrence	287	10.4	–0.8
Liberal Democrats	P. Duffy	280	10.2	–0.7
Turnout		~2,751	36.3	–9.2
Registered electors		7,506		
Labour hold				
Labour hold				
Labour gain from Conservative				

=== Crawley ===
Crawley
Party	Candidate	Votes	%	±%
Liberal Democrats	D. Franks*	1,491	47.8	+7.1
Liberal Democrats	L. Patterson	1,368	43.9	+5.7
Liberal Democrats	J. Felmingham*	1,360	43.6	+6.4
Labour	B. Ellis	1,299	41.7	+5.6
Labour	I. Jefferson*	1,288	41.3	+8.5
Labour	J. Thakoordin	1,176	37.7	+4.9
Conservative	K. Drew	277	8.9	–13.8
Conservative	E. Williamson	242	7.8	–14.0
Turnout		~3,117	40.4	–10.6
Registered electors		7,716		
Liberal Democrats hold				
Liberal Democrats hold				
Liberal Democrats hold				

=== Dallow ===
Dallow (3 seats)
Party	Candidate	Votes	%	±%
Labour	Z. Ahmed	1,459	84.3	+25.0
Labour	M. Ashraf*	1,436	83.0	+24.8
Labour	D. Taylor*	1,384	80.0	+22.8
Liberal Democrats	C. Cason	181	10.5	+1.0
Conservative	S. Choudhury	173	10.0	–7.5
Conservative	P. Price	156	9.0	–7.4
Liberal Democrats	R. Knape	130	7.5	–0.8
Liberal Democrats	M. Knape	126	7.3	–0.4
Green	J. French	97	5.6	–1.4
Communist	T. May	51	2.9	N/A
Turnout		~1,731	37.2	–5.8
Registered electors		7,068		
Labour hold				
Labour hold				
Labour hold				

=== Farley ===
Farley (3 seats)
Party	Candidate	Votes	%	±%
Labour	L. McCowan*	1,822	74.5	+8.2
Labour	L. Merritt	1,752	71.6	+6.3
Labour	S. Timoney	1,604	65.6	+1.5
Conservative	S. Kenneally	363	14.8	–3.9
Conservative	B. Tipler	279	11.4	–6.8
Conservative	M. Wiggins	265	10.8	–5.9
Liberal Democrats	P. Sinclair	241	9.9	+0.6
Liberal Democrats	J. Doyle	209	8.5	–0.3
Liberal Democrats	I. Griggs*	154	6.3	–1.7
Turnout		~2,446	36.1	–5.6
Registered electors		6,775		
Labour hold				
Labour hold				
Labour hold				

=== High Town ===
High Town (3 seats)
Party	Candidate	Votes	%	±%
Labour	J. Fensome*	1,389	55.1	+7.3
Labour	H. Magill*	1,291	50.4	+7.3
Labour	Z. Moran	1,271	50.4	+7.3
Conservative	K. Foord	416	16.5	–18.0
Conservative	M. Orr	416	16.5	–15.7
Liberal Democrats	A. Skepelham	405	16.1	+1.7
Liberal Democrats	S. Rutstein	396	15.7	+4.5
Conservative	M. Orr	383	15.2	–16.3
Liberal Democrats	A. Strange	373	14.8	+3.8
Independent	S. Victor	191	7.6	N/A
Independent	V. King	181	7.2	N/A
Independent	C. Gough	180	7.1	N/A
Green	L. Bliss	147	5.8	–3.5
Turnout		~2,522	35.5	–11.7
Registered electors		7,103		
Labour hold				
Labour hold				
Labour hold				

=== Icknield ===
Icknield (3 seats)
Party	Candidate	Votes	%	±%
Labour	R. Harris	1,450	44.1	+20.3
Labour	A. Flegmann	1,446	44.0	+21.4
Conservative	A. Dunington*	1,373	41.8	–18.5
Labour	A. Tester*	1,363	41.5	+20.2
Conservative	A. Flint*	1,297	39.5	–17.3
Conservative	D. Johnston*	1,289	39.2	–17.2
Liberal Democrats	A. Farrow	398	12.1	–1.0
Liberal Democrats	D. Hinkley	368	11.2	–1.8
Liberal Democrats	T. Keens	357	10.9	–2.1
Turnout		~3,288	36.1	
Registered electors		9,107		
Labour gain from Conservative				
Labour gain from Conservative				
Conservative hold				

=== Leagrave ===
Leagrave (3 seats)
Party	Candidate	Votes	%	±%
Labour	D. Patten	1,610	61.9	+17.5
Labour	S. Roden	1,485	57.1	+13.3
Labour	D. Stewart*	1,476	56.8	+17.7
Conservative	M. Garrett	699	26.9	–16.5
Conservative	R. Burdett	577	22.2	–13.5
Conservative	J. Titmuss	522	20.1	–14.9
Liberal Democrats	D. De-Groot	170	6.5	–3.3
Liberal Democrats	J. Duffy	169	6.5	–2.5
Liberal Democrats	L. De-Groot	157	6.0	–2.2
Independent	M. Smith	129	5.0	N/A
Independent	I. Brodie	63	2.4	N/A
Independent	K. Lawton	59	2.3	N/A
Turnout		~2,600	33.8	–10.1
Registered electors		7,691		
Labour hold				
Labour hold				
Labour gain from Conservative				

=== Lewsey ===
Lewsey (3 seats)
Party	Candidate	Votes	%	±%
Labour	M. Hand	1,774	70.2	+16.8
Labour	T. Shaw*	1,657	65.6	+17.6
Labour	H. Simmons	1,534	60.7	+13.3
Conservative	G. Farrell	384	15.2	–14.4
Conservative	M. Hall	359	14.2	–14.8
Conservative	S. Searle	332	13.1	–12.5
Liberal Democrats	J. Mead	239	9.5	–2.1
Liberal Democrats	M. Robinson	230	9.1	–2.5
Liberal Democrats	C. Mead	224	8.9	–1.6
Turnout		~2,526	29.1	–7.0
Registered electors		8,680		
Labour hold				
Labour hold				
Labour hold				

=== Limbury ===
Limbury (3 seats)
Party	Candidate	Votes	%	±%
Labour	N. Bullock	1,438	53.7	+12.8
Labour	K. McCarthy	1,396	52.1	+11.4
Labour	P. Main*	1,337	49.9	+10.2
Conservative	S. Harrison	527	19.7	–26.5
Conservative	D. Kennedy	511	19.1	–23.5
Independent	C. Brown*	481	18.0	N/A
Conservative	K. Scott*	471	17.6	–23.7
Independent	E. Gough	396	14.8	N/A
Independent	L. Mitchell*	364	13.6	N/A
Liberal Democrats	L. McColm	244	9.1	–0.7
Liberal Democrats	P. Elmes	189	7.1	–2.1
Liberal Democrats	J. Felmingham	189	7.1	–1.7
Turnout		~2,679	38.4	–7.6
Registered electors		6,977		
Labour gain from Conservative				
Labour gain from Conservative				
Labour gain from Conservative				

=== Putteridge ===
Putteridge (3 seats)
Party	Candidate	Votes	%	±%
Liberal Democrats	R. Davies*	1,875	45.7	–5.1
Liberal Democrats	P. Chapman*	1,682	41.0	–6.3
Liberal Democrats	R. Greenham	1,675	40.8	–3.6
Conservative	J. Pemberton	1,127	27.5	–7.1
Conservative	J. Ashby	1,096	26.7	–6.9
Conservative	M. Bradley	1,072	26.1	–6.8
Labour	A. Maddison	1,046	25.5	+10.4
Labour	A. Greaves	1,003	24.4	+10.1
Labour	W. Pratt	938	22.9	+8.8
Green	J. Blake	158	3.8	N/A
Turnout		~4,105	37.5	–12.7
Registered electors		10,946		
Liberal Democrats hold				
Liberal Democrats hold				
Liberal Democrats hold				

=== Saints ===
Saints (3 seats)
Party	Candidate	Votes	%	±%
Labour	M. Akhtar*	1,621	54.5	+8.9
Labour	A. Roden*	1,571	52.8	+7.4
Labour	R. Saleem	1,527	51.3	+6.3
Conservative	M. Riaz	819	27.5	–8.1
Conservative	M. Doward	572	19.2	–14.7
Conservative	M. Thomas	570	19.2	–13.0
Liberal Democrats	B. Murray	360	12.1	+1.8
Liberal Democrats	M. Pringle	334	11.2	+1.0
Liberal Democrats	J. Wates	290	9.8	–0.3
Turnout		~2,974	40.0	–10.3
Registered electors		7,435		
Labour hold				
Labour hold				
Labour hold				

=== South ===
South (3 seats)
Party	Candidate	Votes	%	±%
Labour	C. Pryer	1,486	56.9	+11.2
Labour	T. Hoyle	1,465	56.1	+10.9
Labour	B. Slessor*	1,320	50.6	+6.6
Conservative	T. Kenneally*	729	27.9	–5.2
Conservative	G. Dillingham*	724	27.7	–5.2
Conservative	D. Collins	711	27.2	–4.3
Green	M. Scheimann*	246	9.4	N/A
Liberal Democrats	W. Cole	213	8.2	–0.5
Liberal Democrats	D. Shaw	166	6.4	–2.2
Liberal Democrats	D. Shaw	162	6.2	+0.4
Turnout		~2,611	31.1	–10.8
Registered electors		8,394		
Labour hold				
Labour hold				
Labour hold				

=== Stopsley ===
Stopsley (3 seats)
Party	Candidate	Votes	%	±%
Liberal Democrats	J. Davies*	1,788	58.4	+2.1
Liberal Democrats	M. Dolling*	1,615	52.7	+2.6
Liberal Democrats	M. Lincoln*	1,500	49.0	+2.7
Labour	J. Davis	949	31.0	+11.0
Labour	M. Henry	826	27.0	+7.0
Labour	S. Hinds	787	25.7	+8.8
Conservative	P. Burrett	411	13.4	–15.2
Conservative	N. Doward	385	12.6	–10.1
Conservative	M. Price	361	11.8	–10.4
Turnout		~3,064	44.3	–8.3
Registered electors		6,916		
Liberal Democrats hold				
Liberal Democrats hold				
Liberal Democrats hold				

=== Sundon Park ===
Sundon Park (3 seats)
Party	Candidate	Votes	%	±%
Labour	W. Cooney	1,829	73.9	+20.4
Labour	S. Knight*	1,704	68.8	+16.0
Labour	K. Gale*	1,682	68.0	+16.0
Conservative	D. Johnston	373	15.1	–15.8
Conservative	R. Cartwright	372	15.0	–15.7
Conservative	V. Lacey	335	13.5	–16.5
Liberal Democrats	Y. Edmunds	191	7.7	–4.8
Liberal Democrats	J. Varnals	146	5.9	–6.1
Liberal Democrats	M. Varnals	137	5.5	–4.9
Turnout		~2,475	34.0	–5.6
Registered electors		7,280		
Labour hold				
Labour hold				
Labour hold				
