= 1995 North Tyneside Metropolitan Borough Council election =

1995 UK local government election

The 1995 North Tyneside Metropolitan borough council elections were held on 4 May, the same day as other UK local elections across England and Wales.

== Ward results ==
North Tyneside Council Elections: Monkseaton ward 1995
Party	Candidate	Votes	%	±%
Labour	Ian Grayson	2,133	58.7	
Conservative	Lindsay Perks	1,326	36.5	
Independent	D. Clarkson	174	4.8	
Majority		807		
Turnout			46.6	
Labour gain from Conservative		Swing		
