= 1995 Hyndburn Borough Council election =

1995 UK local government election

Local elections were held in Hyndburn covering one-third of the council seats on 4 May 1995. Labour held 13 of the 16 seats and gained the other 3 seats (St Oswalds, Baxenden & Overton), winning all 16 seats contested. George Slynn was the Labour leader and he held his Netherton seat. Chris Stone had been a Labour Councillor but resigned just weeks before complaining about an authoritarian Labour leadership. The Conservatives had promised to cut Council Tax whilst Labour ran on the issue of huge Conservative cuts from central government to local schools.

== Ward results ==
Altham
Party	Candidate	Votes	%	±%
Labour	Miles Parkinson	283		
Conservative	Rennie Pinder	143		
Independent	Chris Stone	81		
Liberal Democrats	Stuart Bramhill	47		
Turnout		554	53.1	
Labour hold		Swing		

Barnfield
Party	Candidate	Votes	%	±%
Labour	Bob Eddleston	737		
Independent	William Henry Alvy	251		
Conservative	Robert Barnes	166		
Turnout		1144	39.6	
Labour hold		Swing		

Baxenden
Party	Candidate	Votes	%	±%
Labour	Anthony Eric Bushell	644		
Conservative	Joan Scholes	603		
Liberal Democrats	Les Jones	329		
Turnout		1676	40.6	
Labour gain from Conservative		Swing		

Central
Party	Candidate	Votes	%	±%
Labour	Altaf Hussein	567		
Conservative	Stephen George Crooks	462		
Turnout		1029	34.9	
Labour hold		Swing		

Church
Party	Candidate	Votes	%	±%
Labour	Jack Grime	1139		
Conservative	Marion Rayner	489		
Turnout		1628	37.5	
Labour hold		Swing		

Clayton-Le-Moors
Party	Candidate	Votes	%	±%
Labour	Marilyn Brindle	1292		
Conservative	Wilfred MR Harrison	606		
Turnout		1808	39.9	
Labour hold		Swing		

Eachill, Rishton
Party	Candidate	Votes	%	±%
Labour	Harold Tootle	566		
Conservative	Carol Hindle	363		
Turnout		1132	35.6	
Labour hold		Swing		

Huncoat
Party	Candidate	Votes	%	±%
Labour	Marilyn Parkins	729		
Independent	Jack Addison	438		
Conservative	Denis Haworth	148		
Turnout		1313	42.3	
Labour hold		Swing		

Immanuel
Party	Candidate	Votes	%	±%
Labour	Tina Roncoli	964		
Conservative	Marian Barret	475		
Turnout		1439	38.2	
Labour hold		Swing		

Milnshaw
Party	Candidate	Votes	%	±%
Labour	Ian Ormerod	1235		
Conservative	Stanley Horne	694		
Turnout		1929	46.8	
Labour hold		Swing		

Netherton
Party	Candidate	Votes	%	±%
Labour	George Slynn	1036		
Independent	David Mason	292		
Conservative	Neil Spencer	250		
Turnout		1578	42.8	
Labour hold		Swing		

Overton
Party	Candidate	Votes	%	±%
Labour	David Arnold Forshaw	1085		
Conservative	Frank Ford	570		
Turnout		1655	42.8	
Labour gain from Conservative		Swing		

Peel
Party	Candidate	Votes	%	±%
Labour	Mirza Yousef	747		
Conservative	Derek Wolstenholme	353		
Turnout		1090	31.8	
Labour hold		Swing		

Spring Hill
Party	Candidate	Votes	%	±%
Labour	Reg Goggin	901		
Conservative	Paul Travis	175		
Turnout		1076	28.3	
Labour hold		Swing		

St Andrew's
Party	Candidate	Votes	%	±%
Labour	Maurice Cowell	967		
Conservative	Brian Tomlinson	411		
Turnout		1378	42.4	
Labour hold		Swing		

St Oswald's
Party	Candidate	Votes	%	±%
Labour	Malcolm Peplow	1183		
Conservative	Ted Hill	485		
Turnout		1568	36.5	
Labour gain from Conservative		Swing		
