= 1995 Dumfries and Galloway Council election =

1995 Scottish local government election

The 1995 Dumfries and Galloway Council election was held on 6 April 1995, the same day as the other Scottish local government elections.

== Results ==
1995 Dumfries and Galloway election result
Party	Seats	Gains	Losses	Net gain/loss	Seats %	Votes %	Votes	+/−
Independent	28	-	-	▲16	40.0	38.7	15,320	▲7.1
Labour	21	-	-	▲10	30.0	25.2	9,959	▼5.2
Liberal Democrats	10	-	-	▲4	14.3	10.9	4,328	▼1.0
SNP	9	-	-	▲6	12.9	14.7	5,802	▲2.1
Conservative	2	-	-	▼1	2.9	10.2	4,046	▼1.1

Note: The Dumfries and Galloway Regional Council had 35 seats, while the unitary authority has 70.
