= 1995 Newcastle City Council election =

1995 UK local government election

Elections to Newcastle City Council were held in May 1995. The Conservative Party lost further ground, the Liberal Democrats remained the Opposition and Labour slightly increased their majority.

Party	Seats			Council Composition May 1995
Party	1993	1994	1995	Council Composition May 1995
Labour	61	60	63	
Liberal Democrats	11	11	13	
Conservative	6	5	2	
