= 1995 Broxbourne Borough Council election =

1995 UK local government election

The Broxbourne Council election, 1995 was held to elect council members of the Broxbourne Borough Council, the local government authority of the borough of Broxbourne, Hertfordshire, England.

== Composition of expiring seats before election ==
Ward	Party	Incumbent Elected	Incumbent	Standing again?
Broxbourne	Conservative	1991	Joyce Ball	Yes
Bury Green	Conservative	1991	Arthur Dowsett	No
Cheshunt Central	Conservative	1991	Brian Creamer	No
Cheshunt North	Conservative	1991	Margaret Whipperman	No
Flamstead End	Conservative	1991	James Swannell	Yes
Goffs Oak	Conservative	1991	Graham Brewster	Yes
Hoddesdon North	Conservative	1994	Robert Groucott	Yes
Hoddesdon Town	Conservative	1991	Moyra O'Neil	Yes
Rosedale	Conservative	1991	Paul Seeby	Yes
Rye Park	Conservative	1991	Evelyn White	Yes
Theobalds	Conservative	1991	Patricia Morris	Yes
Waltham Cross North	Conservative	1991	Amanda Hayward	Yes
Waltham Cross South	Labour	1991	Jeanne West	Yes
Wormley & Turnford	Conservative	1991	Beryl Poole	Yes

== Election results ==
Broxbourne local election result 1995
Party	Seats	Gains	Losses	Net gain/loss	Seats %	Votes %	Votes	+/−
Labour	8	6	0	+6	53.33	41.10	8,703	
Conservative	6	0	6	-6	40.00	39.36	8,334	
Liberal Democrats	1	0	0	0	6.67	18.51	3,920	
Independent	0	0	0	0	0.00	0.72	153	
BNP	0	0	0	0	0.00	0.31	66	

== Results summary ==
An election was held in 14 wards on 4 May 1995.

15 seats were contested at this election. (2 seats in Waltham Cross South Ward)

This election was noteworthy for the success of the Labour Party who gained 6 seats at the expense of the Conservative Party.

The Labour Party also came first in the popular poll.

This is the only Broxbourne election in which the Conservative Party failed to "win" either in terms of seats won or votes cast.

The 1995 Broxbourne Local Government election was also the final occasion that the Liberal Democrats won a council seat when Paul Seeby defended his Rosedale seat.

Councillor Seeby was subsequently to "cross the floor" of the council chamber to join the Conservative Party.

== Ward results ==
Broxbourne Ward Result 4 May 1995
Party	Candidate	Votes	%	±%
Conservative	Joyce Ball	777	45.92	
Liberal Democrats	Paula Holmes	491	29.02	
Labour	Henry Lucas	424	25.06	
Majority		286		
Turnout		1,692	29.50	
Conservative hold		Swing		

Bury Green Ward Result 4 May 1995
Party	Candidate	Votes	%	±%
Labour	Peter Bond	858	48.23	
Conservative	Jacqueline De Pace	759	42.66	
Liberal Democrats	David Woodcock	162	9.11	
Majority		99		
Turnout		1,779	32.60	
Labour gain from Conservative		Swing		

Cheshunt Central Ward Result 4 May 1995
Party	Candidate	Votes	%	±%
Conservative	Michael Iszatt	525	40.63	
Liberal Democrats	James Elmslie	429	33.20	
Labour	Graham Knight	338	26.17	
Majority		96		
Turnout		1,292	36.50	
Conservative hold		Swing		

Cheshunt North Ward Result 4 May 1995
Party	Candidate	Votes	%	±%
Labour	Malcolm Theobald	880	52.60	
Conservative	Eric Martin	608	36.34	
Liberal Democrats	Roger Durrant	185	11.06	
Majority		272		
Turnout		1,673	31.30	
Labour gain from Conservative		Swing		

Flamstead End Ward Result 4 May 1995
Party	Candidate	Votes	%	±%
Conservative	James Swannell	758	48.53	
Labour	Christopher Simonovitch	587	37.58	
Liberal Democrats	Nicholas Johnson	217	13.89	
Majority		171		
Turnout		1,562	30.20	
Conservative hold		Swing		

Goffs Oak Ward Result 4 May 1995
Party	Candidate	Votes	%	±%
Conservative	Graham Brewster	609	53.05	
Liberal Democrats	Peter Kemp	318	27.70	
Labour	Joan Saggs	221	19.25	
Majority		291		
Turnout		1,148	33.10	
Conservative hold		Swing		

Hoddesdon North Ward Result 4 May 1995
Party	Candidate	Votes	%	±%
Conservative	Robert Groucott	686	41.63	
Liberal Democrats	Julia Davies	563	34.16	
Labour	Stephen Ferns	399	24.21	
Majority		123		
Turnout		1,648	33.10	
Conservative hold		Swing		

Hoddesdon Town Ward Result 4 May 1995
Party	Candidate	Votes	%	±%
Conservative	Moyra O'Neill	648	38.75	
Labour	Trevor Jones	540	32.30	
Liberal Democrats	Anthony Fey	484	28.95	
Majority		108		
Turnout		1,672	33.20	
Conservative hold		Swing		

Rosedale Ward Result 4 May 1995
Party	Candidate	Votes	%	±%
Liberal Democrats	Paul Seeby	394	39.96	
Conservative	Kay Leese	266	26.98	
Labour	Ian Berry	260	26.37	
BNP	David Bruce	66	6.69	
Majority		128		
Turnout		986	32.50	
Liberal Democrats hold		Swing		

Rye Park Ward Result 4 May 1995
Party	Candidate	Votes	%	±%
Labour	Neil Harvey	858	58.02	
Conservative	Evelyn White	447	30.22	
Liberal Democrats	Frank Bassill	174	11.76	
Majority		411		
Turnout		1,479	32.20	
Labour gain from Conservative		Swing		

Theobalds Ward Result 4 May 1995
Party	Candidate	Votes	%	±%
Labour	Richard Walsh	751	48.36	
Conservative	Patricia Morris	647	41.66	
Liberal Democrats	Henry Appiah	155	9.98	
Majority		104		
Turnout		1,553	38.60	
Labour gain from Conservative		Swing		

Waltham Cross North Ward Result 4 May 1995
Party	Candidate	Votes	%	±%
Labour	Susan Walsh	566	47.48	
Conservative	Mandy Hayward	535	44.88	
Liberal Democrats	Anthony Stokes	91	7.62	
Majority		31		
Turnout		1,192	40.0	
Labour gain from Conservative		Swing		

Waltham Cross South Ward Result 2 seats 4 May 1995
Party	Candidate	Votes	%	±%
Labour	Jeanne West	712	32.52	
Labour	Marios Kousoulou	636	29.04	
Conservative	Frederick Kidd	332	15.16	
Conservative	Milan Milovanovic	289	13.19	
Liberal Democrats	Malcolm Aitken	115	5.25	
Liberal Democrats	Bronwen Deards	106	4.84	
Turnout			27.30	
Labour hold		Swing		
Labour hold		Swing		

Wormley / Turnford Ward Result 4 May 1995
Party	Candidate	Votes	%	±%
Labour	Derrick Shiers	576	43.97	
Conservative	Beryl Poole	448	34.20	
Independent	Colin Keighley	153	11.68	
Liberal Democrats	Andrew Wood	133	10.15	
Majority		128		
Turnout		1,310	29.20	
Labour gain from Conservative		Swing		
