= 1995 Cheltenham Borough Council election =

Cheltenham Borough Council election

The 1995 Cheltenham Council election took place on 4 May 1995 to elect members of Cheltenham Borough Council in Gloucestershire, England. One third of the council was up for election and the Liberal Democrats stayed in overall control of the council. For the second year in a row, the Conservatives failed to win a single seat up for election.

After the election, the composition of the council was

- Liberal Democrat 28
- Conservative 8
- People Against Bureaucracy 3
- Labour 2

== Election result ==
Cheltenham local election result 1995
Party	Seats	Gains	Losses	Net gain/loss	Seats %	Votes %	Votes	+/−
Liberal Democrats	15	3	0	+3	88.2	49.0	15,693	-4.0
Labour	1	0	0	-	5.9	14.4	4,605	+3.3
PAB	1	0	0	-	5.9	8.1	2,580	+4.1
Conservative	0	0	2	-2	0.0	27.8	8,884	-1.7
Independent	0	0	1	-1	0.0	0.7	239	-1.8

== Ward results ==
All Saints
Party	Candidate	Votes	%	±%
Liberal Democrats	Stephen Jordan	1,287	54.0	+1.1
Conservative	Susan Starling	754	31.6	−3.3
Labour	Diana Hale	344	14.4	−0.2
Majority		533	22.4	
Turnout		2,385	35.72	
Liberal Democrats hold		Swing		

Charlton Kings
Party	Candidate	Votes	%	±%
Liberal Democrats	Jeremy Worth	1,539	49.8	−4.8
Conservative	Ian Perry	1,267	41.0	+1.8
Labour	Adam Moliver	287	9.3	+3.1
Majority		272	8.8	
Turnout		3,093	48.29	
Liberal Democrats hold		Swing		

College
Party	Candidate	Votes	%	±%
Liberal Democrats	Mary Gray	1,656	50.3	−4.3
Conservative	John Watts	1,341	40.7	+0.5
Labour	Adrian Ham	297	9.0	+3.8
Majority		272	9.6	
Turnout		3,294	48.68	
Liberal Democrats hold		Swing		

Hatherley & The Reddings
Party	Candidate	Votes	%	±%
Liberal Democrats	Susan Townsend*	1,363	51.0	−5.1
Liberal Democrats	Christopher Read	1,307	48.9	−7.2
Conservative	Andrew Payne	739	27.6	−6.8
Conservative	Edward Warhurst	641	24.0	−10.4
PAB	Roger Hicks	446	16.7	N/A
Labour	Eileen Bailey	435	16.3	+6.7
PAB	Martin Burford	416	15.6	N/A
Majority		568	21.3	
Turnout		2,674	35.52	
Liberal Democrats hold		Swing		
Liberal Democrats hold		Swing		

Hesters Way
Party	Candidate	Votes	%	±%
Liberal Democrats	David Banyard*	1,318	68.5	−8.3
Labour	Andre Curtis	343	17.8	+7.5
Conservative	Helen Todman	262	13.6	+0.7
Majority		975	50.7	
Turnout		1,923	26.95	
Liberal Democrats hold		Swing		

Lansdown
Party	Candidate	Votes	%	±%
Liberal Democrats	Stephen Harvey	968	46.0	−6.4
Conservative	Aileen Bramah*	873	41.5	+0.4
Labour	Robert Irons	265	12.6	+6.1
Majority		95	4.5	
Turnout		2,106	35.08	
Liberal Democrats gain from Conservative		Swing		

Leckhampton with Up Hatherley
Party	Candidate	Votes	%	±%
Liberal Democrats	Hazel Langford*	1,177	42.5	−1.9
PAB	David Hall	878	31.7	+3.4
Conservative	Jill Trewhella	712	25.7	+3.0
Majority		299	10.8	
Turnout		2,767	43.57	
Liberal Democrats hold		Swing		

Park
Party	Candidate	Votes	%	±%
Liberal Democrats	Adrian Jackson	1,243	46.2	−2.6
Conservative	Robert Garnham	1,197	44.5	−2.3
Labour	Anne Morgan	250	9.3	+4.9
Majority		46	4.5	
Turnout		2,690	46.01	
Liberal Democrats gain from Conservative		Swing		

Pittville
Party	Candidate	Votes	%	±%
Labour	Martin Hale	1,170	42.6	+8.0
Liberal Democrats	Colin O'Connell	1,097	39.9	−10.1
Conservative	Reginald Built-Leonard	386	14.1	−1.3
PAB	George Readman	94	3.4	N/A
Majority		73	2.7	
Turnout		2,747	46.91	
Labour hold		Swing		

Prestbury
Party	Candidate	Votes	%	±%
PAB	Andrew Cornish*	1,162	47.0	−3.5
Liberal Democrats	Robert Jones	736	29.7	+8.4
Conservative	Russell Hopkins	576	23.3	−1.3
Majority		426	17.3	
Turnout		2,474	42.96	
PAB hold		Swing		

St Mark's
Party	Candidate	Votes	%	±%
Liberal Democrats	Jeremy Whales	945	65.2	−5.4
Labour	Joseph Kavanagh	327	22.6	+5.9
Conservative	John Melville-Smith	177	12.2	−0.4
Majority		618	42.6	
Turnout		1,449	27.57	
Liberal Democrats hold		Swing		

St Paul's
Party	Candidate	Votes	%	±%
Liberal Democrats	Andrew McKinlay*	1,109	65.8	+4.0
Labour	Mark Sherbourne	309	18.4	+3.5
Conservative	Puck Wertwyn	264	15.8	−7.5
Majority		800	32.6	
Turnout		1,682	29.40	
Liberal Democrats hold		Swing		

St Peter's
Party	Candidate	Votes	%	±%
Liberal Democrats	Carol Hawkins*	958	53.3	−9.1
Labour	Clive Harriss	578	32.1	+10.5
Conservative	Ian Cresswell	262	14.6	−1.4
Majority		380	21.2	
Turnout		1,798	30.14	
Liberal Democrats hold		Swing		

Swindon
Party	Candidate	Votes	%	±%
Liberal Democrats	Jacqueline Gundy	304	49.3	+33.4
Independent	Desmond May	239	38.7	+3.6
Conservative	Julie Garnham	74	12.0	N/A
Majority		65	10.6	
Turnout		617	43.31	
Liberal Democrats gain from Independent		Swing		
