= 1995 Guildford Borough Council election =

1995 UK local government election

The seventh full elections for Guildford Borough Council took place on 4 May 1995. The results saw the Liberal Democrats win majority control of the council for the first time winning 23 of the 45 seats. The Conservatives won 13 seats. Labour retained 6 seats and 3 independents were elected.

Compared to the 1991 council elections, the Liberal Democrats gained 4 net seats, gaining 7 and losing 3. Compared to the 1991 council elections the Conservatives lost 6 net seats, losing 7 and gaining 1. Compared to the 1991 council elections there were 2 more independents on the council.

The Liberal Democrats gained Merrow and Burpham ward, with 3 councillors, from the Conservatives and Worplesdon ward, also with three councillors, from the Conservatives. The Conservatives additionally lost their one councillor on Tillingbourne ward to the Liberal Democrats.

To the west of the borough the Liberal Democrats lost 3 councillors. The Liberal Democrats lost both Ash Vale councillors to the Putting Ash Vale First group and the Liberal Democrats also lost one of their three councillors in the neighbouring Ash ward to the Conservatives.

== Ward results ==
Ash (top 3 candidates elected)
Party	Candidate	Votes	%	±%
Conservative	John Ades	1199		
Liberal Democrats	Alan Hilliar	1140		
Liberal Democrats	Fiona White	1119		
Liberal Democrats	Barry Talman	1085		
Conservative	Jennifer Cassar	903		
Conservative	Nicolas Sutcliffe	844		
Labour	Gwyneth Grout	393		
Labour	Royston Hayward	387		
Labour	William Street	366		
Majority		34		
Turnout				
Conservative gain from Liberal Democrats		Swing		
Liberal Democrats hold		Swing		
Liberal Democrats hold		Swing		

Ash Vale (top 2 candidates elected)
Party	Candidate	Votes	%	±%
Independent Putting Ash Vale First	David Evans	842		
Independent Putting Ash Vale First	Jonathan Maugham	794		
Liberal Democrats	Olwen Hooker	691		
Liberal Democrats	Gerald Taylor	546		
Conservative	Charles Grattan	332		
Conservative	Stuart Page	281		
Green	Angeline Bail	62		
Green	Stephen Flinn	48		
Majority		103		
Turnout				
Independent hold		Swing		
Independent gain from Liberal Democrats		Swing		

Christchurch (top 2 candidates elected)
Party	Candidate	Votes	%	±%
Liberal Democrats	Vivienne Johnson	1135		
Conservative	Andrew Hodges	1095		
Liberal Democrats	George Mowat	953		
Conservative	David Hunter	866		
Labour	William Scott	135		
Labour	Tim Wolfenden	122		
Majority		142		
Turnout				
Liberal Democrats hold		Swing		
Conservative hold		Swing		

Clandon & Horsley (top 3 candidates elected)
Party	Candidate	Votes	%	±%
Conservative	Jennifer Powell	1802		
Conservative	Andrew French	1708		
Conservative	Jennifer Wicks	1656		
Liberal Democrats	Margaret Burnham	719		
Liberal Democrats	Ian Oxford	694		
Liberal Democrats	Louise Morales	649		
Labour	Meriel Beynon	385		
Labour	Neil Cameron	294		
Majority		937		
Turnout				
Conservative hold		Swing		
Conservative hold		Swing		
Conservative hold		Swing		

Effingham (only 1 candidate elected)
Party	Candidate	Votes	%	±%
Conservative	Jessica Page	523		
Liberal Democrats	Charles Thorne	476		
Labour	Ruth Cameron	59		
Majority		47		
Turnout				
Conservative hold		Swing		

Friary & St. Nicolas (top 3 candidates elected)
Party	Candidate	Votes	%	±%
Liberal Democrats	Richard Marks	1545		
Liberal Democrats	Tom Sharp	1514		
Liberal Democrats	Robert Blundell	1464		
Conservative	Phillip Hooper	502		
Labour	Gary Hills	465		
Conservative	Harold Webb	448		
Labour	Stephen Walsh	441		
Labour	Douglas Pym,	428		
Majority		962		
Liberal Democrats hold		Swing		
Liberal Democrats hold		Swing		
Liberal Democrats hold		Swing		

Holy Trinity (top 2 candidates elected)
Party	Candidate	Votes	%	±%
Liberal Democrats	Tamsy Baker	1007		
Liberal Democrats	Gordon Bridger	982		
Conservative	Veronica Stiastny	620		
Conservative	Lee Arnold	586		
Labour	Julie Hall	168		
Labour	Stephen Chapman	167		
Majority		362		
Liberal Democrats hold		Swing		
Liberal Democrats hold		Swing		

Lovelace (only 1 candidate elected)
Party	Candidate	Votes	%	±%
Conservative	Susan Greenleaf	652		
Liberal Democrats	Joan Hartley	430		
Majority		222		
Conservative hold		Swing		

Merrow & Burpham (top 3 candidates elected)
Party	Candidate	Votes	%	±%
Liberal Democrats	Vivien Biggs	2337		
Liberal Democrats	Charles Shepperd	2005		
Liberal Democrats	Andrew Allan	1979		
Conservative	Jennifer Jordan	1472		
Conservative	David Carpenter	1402		
Conservative	Nick Brogham	1346		
Labour	Edward Allford	601		
Labour	Michael Hornsby-Smith	584		
Labour	Malcolm Hill	555		
Majority		507		
Liberal Democrats gain from Conservative		Swing		
Liberal Democrats gain from Conservative		Swing		
Liberal Democrats gain from Conservative		Swing		

Normandy (only 1 candidate elected)
Party	Candidate	Votes	%	±%
Liberal Democrats	David Newman	670		
Conservative	Ann Seymour	461		
Labour	John Barbour	66		
Majority		209		
Liberal Democrats hold		Swing		

Onslow (top 3 candidates elected)
Party	Candidate	Votes	%	±%
Liberal Democrats	Tony Phillips	1230		
Liberal Democrats	Lynda Strudwick	1224		
Liberal Democrats	Jackie Biggs	1143		
Conservative	Bernard Parke	771		
Labour	Florence Flynn	498		
Labour	Keith Parfitt	470		
Labour	Muhammed Islam	454		
Majority		372		
Liberal Democrats hold		Swing		
Liberal Democrats hold		Swing		
Liberal Democrats hold		Swing		

Pilgrims (top 2 candidates elected)
Party	Candidate	Votes	%	±%
Conservative	Robert Rolfe	691		
Conservative	Alan Dewhurst	659		
Liberal Democrats	Marilyn Merryweather	301		
Liberal Democrats	Lavinia Wright	282		
Labour	Elizabeth Bullock	157		
Labour	Margaret Kennedy	159		
Majority		358		
Conservative hold		Swing		
Conservative hold		Swing		

Pirbright (only 1 candidate elected)
Party	Candidate	Votes	%	±%
Conservative	Catherine Cobley	519		
Liberal Democrats	Terrence King	188		
Labour	Norma Hedger	47		
Majority		331		
Conservative hold		Swing		

Send (top 2 candidates elected)
Party	Candidate	Votes	%	±%
Conservative	Keith Taylor	617		
Conservative	Michael Cave	578		
Liberal Democrats	Elizabeth Hogger	436		
Liberal Democrats	Philip Palmer	417		
Labour	Sheila Bean	197		
Labour	Keith Longhurst	197		
Majority		142		
Conservative hold		Swing		
Conservative hold		Swing		

Shalford (only 1 candidate elected)
Party	Candidate	Votes	%	±%
Conservative	Sarah Stewart	739		
Liberal Democrats	Leonard Grugeon	725		
Labour	Michael Jeram	184		
Majority		14		
Conservative hold		Swing		

Stoke (top 3 candidates elected)
Party	Candidate	Votes	%	±%
Labour	Sallie Thorneberry	1349		
Labour	Angela Gunning	1258		
Labour	Heather Tipton	1253		
Liberal Democrats	John Chapman	380		
Liberal Democrats	Sian Jenkins	360		
Liberal Democrats	Alan Lawrence	322		
Conservative	Herbert Warwick	251		
Conservative	Steven Meager	218		
Conservative	David Quelch	201		
Majority		873		
Labour hold		Swing		
Labour hold		Swing		
Labour hold		Swing		

Stoughton (top 3 candidates elected)
Party	Candidate	Votes	%	±%
Liberal Democrats	Christopher Fox	1329		
Liberal Democrats	Sue Fox	1306		
Liberal Democrats	Jayne Marke	1217		
Labour	Alexander Macdonald	430		
Labour	Susan Gomm	407		
Labour	Lynne Macdonald	403		
Conservative	Christine Stacy	300		
Conservative	Aidan Langley	285		
Conservative	Dennis Wilde	258		
Independent Green	Michael Belford	124		
Majority		787		
Liberal Democrats hold		Swing		
Liberal Democrats hold		Swing		
Liberal Democrats hold		Swing		

Tillingbourne (top 2 candidates elected)
Party	Candidate	Votes	%	±%
Independent	Keith Childs	1309		
Liberal Democrats	Patricia Gumbrell	757		
Conservative	David Davis	702		
Conservative	David Fleming	683		
Majority		55		
Independent hold		Swing		
Liberal Democrats gain from Conservative		Swing		

Tongham (only 1 candidate elected)
Party	Candidate	Votes	%	±%
Liberal Democrats	Mike Pooley	439		
Conservative	James Amos	203		
Labour	Frank Gunning	102		
Majority		236		
Liberal Democrats hold		Swing		

Westborough (top 3 candidates elected)
Party	Candidate	Votes	%	±%
Labour	John Woodhatch	1319		
Labour	Keith Horne	1241		
Labour	Peter Jennings	1149		
Liberal Democrats	Keith Briggs	567		
Liberal Democrats	Jeannie Batchelor	518		
Liberal Democrats	Malcom Johnson	441		
Conservative	Geoffrey Greave	201		
Conservative	Mary Johns	201		
Conservative	Pamela Parke	194		
Majority		582		
Labour hold		Swing		
Labour hold		Swing		
Labour hold		Swing		

Worplesdon (top 3 candidates elected)
Party	Candidate	Votes	%	±%
Liberal Democrats	Auriol Earle	1462		
Liberal Democrats	Alexander Sutcliffe	1436		
Liberal Democrats	Gregory Wade	1428		
Conservative	David Elms	1029		
Conservative	Robert McShee	975		
Conservative	Kenneth Johns	950		
Labour	Alan Ritchie	326		
Labour	Kathleen Parfitt	323		
Labour	Harold Richards	293		
Majority		399		
Liberal Democrats gain from Conservative		Swing		
Liberal Democrats gain from Conservative		Swing		
Liberal Democrats gain from Conservative		Swing		
