= 1995 Gloucester City Council election =

UK local election

The 1995 Gloucester City Council election took place on 4 May 1995 to elect members of Gloucester City Council in England.

== Results ==
Gloucester City Council election, 1995
Party	Seats	Gains	Losses	Net gain/loss	Seats %	Votes %	Votes	+/−
Conservative	7					20.0		
Labour	20					57.1		
Liberal Democrats	8					22.9		
Other	0					0.0		

== Ward results ==
=== Barnwood ===
Barnwood 1995
Party	Candidate	Votes	%	±%
Labour	M. Lawlor	2,101	54.9	
Liberal Democrats	B. Tebbutt	904	23.6	
Conservative	D. Cole	822	21.5	
Turnout		11303		
Labour hold		Swing		

=== Barton ===
Barton (2) 1995
Party	Candidate	Votes	%	±%
Labour	Ms.* R. Workman	1,198	78.0	
Labour	T. Haines	1,031		
Liberal Democrats	Ms. B. Caldwell	177	11.5	
Conservative	L. Proctor	611	10.5	
Liberal Democrats	L. Holman	161		
Turnout		4986		
Labour hold		Swing		

=== Eastgate ===
Eastgate 1995
Party	Candidate	Votes	%	±%
Labour	B.* O'Neill	1,419	75.2	
Conservative	C. Marshall	306	16.2	
Liberal Democrats	U. Bhaimia	163	8.6	
Turnout		5880		
Labour hold		Swing		

=== Hucclecote ===
Hucclecote 1995
Party	Candidate	Votes	%	±%
Liberal Democrats	Ms. R. Holman	1,476	42.0	
Labour	R. Mills	1134	32.2	
Conservative	Ms. B. Twinn	907	25.8	
Turnout		8039		
Liberal Democrats hold		Swing		

=== Kingsholm ===
Kingsholm 1995
Party	Candidate	Votes	%	±%
Liberal Democrats	Ms. V. Parry	1,407	47.4	
Conservative	P. James	807	27.2	
Labour	D. Hitchings	755	25.4	
Turnout		6480		
Liberal Democrats hold		Swing		

=== Linden ===
Linden 1995
Party	Candidate	Votes	%	±%
Labour	Ms. G. Gillespie	1,540	74.9	
Conservative	D. Knight	368	17.9	
Liberal Democrats	Ms. V. Wilcox	149	7.2	
Turnout		5327		
Labour hold		Swing		

=== Longlevens ===
Longlevens 1995
Party	Candidate	Votes	%	±%
Labour	I. Cahill	1,694	52.2	
Conservative	N.* Partridge	889	27.4	
Liberal Democrats	D. Mallett	664	20.4	
Turnout		6673		
Labour hold		Swing		

=== Matson ===
Matson 1995
Party	Candidate	Votes	%	±%
Labour	K.* Stephens	1,268	73.9	
Conservative	H. Blagden	285	16.6	
Liberal Democrats	Ms. V. Ellis	163	9.5	
Turnout		5662		
Labour hold		Swing		

=== Podsmead ===
Podsmead 1995
Party	Candidate	Votes	%	±%
Labour	D.* Dobbins	1,407	66.0	
Conservative	J. Clarke	378	17.7	
Liberal Democrats	C. Reed	347	16.3	
Turnout		5742		
Labour hold		Swing		

=== Quedgeley ===
Quedgeley 1995
Party	Candidate	Votes	%	±%
Labour	D. Green	1,128	44.6	
Conservative	D.* Hall	778	30.7	
Liberal Democrats	A. Balsham	625	24.7	
Turnout		6558		
Labour win (new seat)				

=== Tuffley ===
Tuffey 1995
Party	Candidate	Votes	%	±%
Labour	A.* Cook	1,755	65.7	
Conservative	K. Moran	587	22.0	
Liberal Democrats	Ms. A. Evans	331	12.4	
Turnout		6104		
Labour hold		Swing		

=== Westgate ===
Westgate 1995
Party	Candidate	Votes	%	±%
Liberal Democrats	P. Munisamy	771	41.9	
Labour	T. Smith	657	35.7	
Conservative	Ms. J. Morley	414	22.5	
Turnout		5155		
Liberal Democrats hold		Swing		
