= 1995 East Dunbartonshire Council election =

1995 Scottish local government election

The 1995 East Dunbartonshire Council election was held on 6 April 1995, the same day as the other Scottish local government elections.

== Results ==
1995 East Dunbartonshire Council election result
Party	Seats	Gains	Losses	Net gain/loss	Seats %	Votes %	Votes	+/−
Labour	15	-	-		57.7	40.8	17,746	
Liberal Democrats	9	-	-		34.6	23.8	10,337	
Conservative	2	-	-		7.7	19.3	8,365	
SNP	0	-	-		0.0	16.1	6,994	
