= 1995 Perth and Kinross Council election =

1995 Scottish local government election

The 1995 Perth and Kinross Council election was held on 6 April 1995, the same day as the other Scottish local government elections.

== Results ==
1995 Perth and Kinross Council election result
Party	Seats	Gains	Losses	Net gain/loss	Seats %	Votes %	Votes	+/−
SNP	18	-	-	▲13	56.3	41.0	21,347	▲8.2
Labour	6	-	-	▲3	18.8	14.3	7,462	▲5.4
Liberal Democrats	5	-	-	▲3	15.6	13.0	6,762	▲1.6
Conservative	2	-	-	▼14	6.3	24.8	12,920	▼14.0
Independent	1	-	-	▼2	3.1	6.7	3,495	▼1.6
Scottish Green	0	-	-	Steady	0.0	0.1	29	New
