= 1995 Wolverhampton Metropolitan Borough Council election =

1995 UK local government election

The 1995 Council elections held in Wolverhampton on Thursday 4 May 1995 were one third, and 20 of the 60 seats were up for election.

During the 1995 election the Merry Hill ward had two seats contested due to a vacancy arising.

Prior to the election the composition of the council was:

- Labour 33
- Conservative 25
- Liberal Democrats 3

Following the election the composition of the council was:

- Labour 39
- Conservative 19
- Liberal Democrats 2

== Ward results ==
Bilston East
Party	Candidate	Votes	%	±%
Labour	T H Turner	1879		
Liberal Democrats	Mrs A Ramsbottom	516		
Conservative	P S Topliss	233		
Majority		1363		

Bilston North
Party	Candidate	Votes	%	±%
Labour	Miss M Benton	2431		
Conservative	M Berry	714		
Liberal Democrats	I Ellis	221		
Majority		1717		

Blakenhall
Party	Candidate	Votes	%	±%
Labour	Mrs J Rowley	2757		
Conservative	L Sandhu	883		
Liberal Democrats	B Beard	215		
Majority		1874		

Bushbury
Party	Candidate	Votes	%	±%
Labour	I Brookfield	1887		
Conservative	P J Turley	1665		
Liberal Democrats	I Jenkins	188		
Majority		222		

East Park
Party	Candidate	Votes	%	±%
Labour	F Docherty	2348		
Conservative	A Wynne	322		
Liberal Democrats	A Whitehouse	247		
Majority		2026		

Ettingshall
Party	Candidate	Votes	%	±%
Labour	J Jones	2152		
Conservative	J K Kanghura	327		
Liberal Democrats	C Trace	145		
Majority		1825		

Fallings Park
Party	Candidate	Votes	%	±%
Labour	G Foster	2113		
Conservative	B Findlay	1027		
Liberal Democrats	S Birch	248		
Majority		1086		

Graiseley
Party	Candidate	Votes	%	±%
Conservative	J P Mellor	2306		
Labour	M Shafi	2129		
Liberal Democrats	R Gray	326		
Majority		177		

Heath Town
Party	Candidate	Votes	%	±%
Labour	M Jaspal	1411		
Liberal	C Hallmark	540		
Conservative	G Jevon	292		
Liberal Democrats	T Gwinnett	84		
Majority		871		

Low Hill
Party	Candidate	Votes	%	±%
Labour	P O'Neill	2034		
Conservative	K Hodges	508		
Liberal Democrats	D Iles	185		
Majority		1526		

Merry Hill
Party	Candidate	Votes	%	±%
Labour	L Miles	1734		
Conservative	R Hart	1720		
Liberal Democrats	P White	361		
Majority		14		

Oxley
Party	Candidate	Votes	%	±%
Labour	C Siarkiewicz	2030		
Conservative	N Patten	1034		
Liberal Democrats	C Jenkins	342		
Majority		996		

Park
Party	Candidate	Votes	%	±%
Labour	D Saville	2217		
Conservative	Mrs M W Hodson	1829		
Liberal Democrats	B Lewis	403		
Majority		378		

Penn
Party	Candidate	Votes	%	±%
Conservative	Paddy Bradley	1876		
Labour	J Thomas	1829		
Liberal Democrats	P Beeston	466		
Majority		47		

St Peter's
Party	Candidate	Votes	%	±%
Labour	R Lawrence	2500		
Conservative	D S Gill	547		
Liberal Democrats	D Murray	259		
Majority		1953		

Spring Vale
Party	Candidate	Votes	%	±%
Labour	M Thomas	1997		
Liberal Democrats	M Heap	1876		
Conservative	C Haynes	251		
Liberal	A A C Bourke	110		
Majority		121		

Tettenhall Regis
Party	Candidate	Votes	%	±%
Conservative	J Davis	1597		
Liberal Democrats	L McLean	1245		
Labour	J Jasbir	805		
Majority		352		

Tettenhall Wightwick
Party	Candidate	Votes	%	±%
Conservative	Mrs J Stevenson	2271		
Labour	P Hodson	1229		
Liberal Democrats	Mrs T O'Brien	384		
Majority		1042		

Wednesfield North
Party	Candidate	Votes	%	±%
Labour	Mrs G Stafford-Good	2418		
Conservative	C Tanski	814		
Liberal	M Pearson	299		
Liberal Democrats	M P Reaney	126		
Majority		1604		

Wednesfield South
Party	Candidate	Votes	%	±%
Labour	P Kalinauckas	1939		
Conservative	T Brindley	1115		
Liberal Democrats	J Steatham	256		
Majority		824		
