= 1995 Rochford District Council election =

English District Council election

- 4 May 1995

13 out of 40 seats on the Rochford District Council 21 seats needed for a majority
	First party	Second party	Third party
Party	Liberal Democrats	Labour	Conservative
Last election	10	4	0
Seats before	21	7	10
Seats won	8	3	1
Seats after	22	8	7
Seat change	▲1	▲1	▼3
Popular vote	5,562	3,739	3,320
Percentage	42.6%	25.4%	25.4%
Swing			▼
	Fourth party	Fifth party
Party	Independent	Residents
Last election	N/A	1
Seats before	0	2
Seats won	1	N/A
Seats after	1	2
Seat change	▲1	Steady
Popular vote	430	N/A
Percentage	3.3%	N/A

Elections to Rochford District Council, in Essex, England, were held on 4 May 1995. One third of the council was up for election.

== Results summary ==
1995 Rochford Borough Council election
Party	This election			Full council			This election		
Party	Seats	Net	Seats %	Other	Total	Total %	Votes	Votes %	+/−
Liberal Democrats	8	▲1	61.5	14	22	55.0	5,562	42.6	
Labour	3	▲1	23.1	5	8	20.0	3,739	28.6	
Conservative	1	▼3	7.7	6	7	17.5	3,320	25.4	
Residents	0	Steady	0.0	2	2	5.0	0	0.0	
Independent	1	▲1	7.7	0	1	2.5	430	3.3	

== Ward results ==
=== Ashingdon ===
Ashingdon
Party	Candidate	Votes	%	±%
Liberal Democrats	A. Hosking	471	55.7	
Conservative	A. Hornett	235	27.8	
Labour	M. Vince	140	16.5	
Majority			27.9	
Turnout			36.6	
Liberal Democrats hold		Swing		

=== Barling & Sutton ===
Barling & Sutton
Party	Candidate	Votes	%	±%
Independent	G. Lee	430	67.6	
Labour	D. Ford	178	28.0	
Conservative	T. Chapman	28	4.4	
Majority			39.6	
Turnout			46.6	
Independent gain from Conservative		Swing		

=== Canewdon ===
Canewdon
Party	Candidate	Votes	%	±%
Liberal Democrats	T. Powell	477	69.8	
Conservative	L. Butcher	117	17.1	
Labour	C. Stephenson	89	13.0	
Majority			52.7	
Turnout			39.9	
Liberal Democrats hold		Swing		

=== Foulness & Great Wakering East ===
Foulness & Great Wakering East
Party	Candidate	Votes	%	±%
Conservative	R. Pearson	403	55.1	
Labour	H. King	328	44.9	
Majority			10.2	
Turnout			44.3	
Conservative hold		Swing		

=== Grange & Rawreth ===
Grange & Rawreth
Party	Candidate	Votes	%	±%
Liberal Democrats	E. Francis	739	43.4	
Labour	D. Rossi	588	34.5	
Conservative	G. Mockford	375	22.0	
Majority			8.9	
Turnout			37.7	
Liberal Democrats hold		Swing		

=== Great Wakering Central ===
Great Wakering Central
Party	Candidate	Votes	%	±%
Labour	D. Sutton	Unopposed		
Majority			0.0	
Turnout			0.0	
Labour hold				

=== Great Wakering West ===
Great Wakering West
Party	Candidate	Votes	%	±%
Labour	G. Fox	378	91.7	
Conservative	R. Powell	34	8.3	
Majority			83.4	
Turnout			41.4	
Labour hold		Swing		

=== Hawkwell East ===
Hawkwell East
Party	Candidate	Votes	%	±%
Liberal Democrats	V. Leach	917	51.0	
Labour	J. Dickson	478	26.6	
Conservative	J. Roden	403	22.4	
Majority			24.4	
Turnout			32.1	
Liberal Democrats gain from Conservative		Swing		

=== Hawkwell West ===
Hawkwell West
Party	Candidate	Votes	%	±%
Labour	M. Weir	693	52.8	
Liberal Democrats	K. Saunders	314	23.9	
Conservative	J. Fawell	305	23.2	
Majority			28.9	
Turnout			43.7	
Labour gain from Conservative		Swing		

=== Lodge ===
Lodge
Party	Candidate	Votes	%	±%
Liberal Democrats	M. Brown	1,037	61.8	
Conservative	T. Livings	341	20.3	
Labour	J. Foley	299	17.8	
Majority			41.5	
Turnout			36.8	
Liberal Democrats hold		Swing		

=== Trinity ===
Trinity
Party	Candidate	Votes	%	±%
Liberal Democrats	S. Cumberland	567	55.1	
Conservative	J. Duncombe	273	26.5	
Labour	G. Angus	189	18.4	
Majority			28.6	
Turnout			35.3	
Liberal Democrats hold		Swing		

=== Wheatley ===
Wheatley
Party	Candidate	Votes	%	±%
Liberal Democrats	S. Tellis	501	48.5	
Conservative	P. Savill	389	37.7	
Labour	V. Foley	142	13.8	
Majority			10.8	
Turnout			43.8	
Liberal Democrats hold		Swing		

=== Whitehouse ===
Whitehouse
Party	Candidate	Votes	%	±%
Liberal Democrats	J. Giles	539	45.2	
Conservative	M. Webster	417	35.0	
Labour	J. Daly	237	19.9	
Majority			10.2	
Turnout			44.7	
Liberal Democrats hold		Swing		
