= Wansbeck District =

Former local government district in England

- Former district
- Shown within Northumberland
- Coordinates: 55.169°N 1.574°W
- Sovereign state: United Kingdom
- Constituent country: England
- Region: North East England
- Administrative county: Northumberland
- Founded: 1 April 1974
- Abolished: 1 April 2009
- Admin. HQ: Ashington

Government
  - Type: Wansbeck District Council
  - Leadership: Leader & Cabinet
- Time zone: UTC+0 (Greenwich Mean Time)
  - Summer (DST): UTC+1 (British Summer Time)
- ONS code: 35UG
- Ethnicity: 99.0% White
- Website: wansbeck.gov.uk

Wansbeck was a local government district in south-east Northumberland, England. Its main population centres were Ashington, Bedlington and Newbiggin-by-the-Sea. The district had a resident population of 61,138 according to the 2001 census

The area which was bounded by the district is mostly urban, on the North Sea coast north of the Tyneside conurbation. It bordered Blyth Valley district to the south, the border being the River Blyth. It was formed on 1 April 1974, under the Local Government Act 1972, by the merger of the urban districts of Ashington, Bedlingtonshire and Newbiggin-by-the-Sea. It is named after the River Wansbeck.

The district council was abolished as part of the 2009 structural changes to local government in England effective from 1 April 2009 with responsibilities being transferred to Northumberland County Council, a unitary authority.

== Settlements and parishes ==
The district contained the parishes of:

- Ashington
- East Bedlington
- Newbiggin-by-the-Sea
- North Bedlington
- West Bedlington

== Notable people ==
- Sean Taylor, professional footballer

== See also ==
- Wansbeck District Council elections
