= Suffolk Coastal District Council elections =

Local government elections in Suffolk, England

Suffolk Coastal District Council in Suffolk, England was elected every four years. After the last boundary changes in 2015, 42 councillors were elected from 26 wards. The council was abolished in 2019, with the area becoming part of East Suffolk.

== Political control ==
From the first elections to the council in 1973 until its abolition in 2019, political control of the council was held by the following parties:

Party in control	Years
No overall control	1973–1976
Conservative	1976–1995
No overall control	1995–1999
Conservative	1999–2019

=== Leadership ===
The leader of the council from 1999 until the council's abolition in 2019 was:

Councillor	Party	From	To
Ray Herring	Conservative	1999	31 Mar 2019

== Maps ==
=== Seat maps ===
1983 seat map

1987 seat map

1991 seat map

1995 seat map

1999 seat map

2003 seat map

2007 seat map

2011 seat map

2015 seat map

== Council elections ==
Composition of the council
Year	Conservative	Labour	Liberal Democrats (Note: Includes totals for the predecessors of the Liberal Democrats, the Liberal Party and SDP (both of which participated in the Alliance).)	Independents & Others	Council control after election
Local government reorganisation; council established (55 seats)
1973	23	7	3	22	No overall control
1976	38	3	1	13	Conservative
1979	38	4	0	13	Conservative
New ward boundaries (55 seats)
1983	44	2	0	9	Conservative
1987	39	1	6	9	Conservative
1991	36	1	6	9	Conservative
1995	18	17	15	5	No overall control
1999	36	8	10	1	Conservative
New ward boundaries (55 seats)
2003	43	2	10	0	Conservative
2007	45	1	9	0	Conservative
2011	44	4	5	2	Conservative
New ward boundaries (42 seats)
2015	37	1	2	2	Conservative
Council abolished; merged into East Suffolk District Council

== By-election results ==
A by-election occurs when seats become vacant between council elections. Below is a summary of by-elections from 1983 onwards. Full by-election results are listed under the last regular election preceding the by-election and can be found by clicking on the ward name.

=== 1983-1994 ===
Ward	Date	Incumbent party	Winning party
Felixstowe East	7 November 1985	Conservative	Conservative
Hasketon	7 November 1985	Conservative	Conservative
Kesgrave	21 November 1985	Conservative	Conservative
Felixstowe South	5 November 1987	Independent	Conservative
Felixstowe North	8 September 1988	Conservative	Labour
Orford	9 April 1992	Independent	Liberal Democrats
Felixstowe West	4 February 1993	Labour	Liberal Democrats
Dennington	24 March 1994	Independent	Independent
Otley	24 March 1994	Conservative	Liberal Democrats

=== 1995-2006 ===
Ward	Date	Incumbent party	Winning party
Kelsale	19 October 1995	Labour	Liberal Democrats
Bramfield & Cratfield	20 June 1996	Labour	Conservative
Dennington	21 November 1996	Liberal Democrats	Conservative
Ufford	19 April 1998	Conservative	Conservative
Bramfield & Cratfield	4 May 2000	Conservative	Conservative
Felixstowe South	26 October 2000	Conservative	Conservative
Framlingham	7 June 2001	Labour	Conservative
Nacton	20 September 2001	Conservative	Conservative
Kesgrave	20 September 2001	Conservative	Conservative
Yoxford	5 February 2004	Conservative	Liberal Democrats
Felixstowe South	22 April 2004	Conservative	Conservative
Farlingaye	10 March 2005	Liberal Democrats	Liberal Democrats

=== 2007-2019 ===
Ward	Date	Incumbent party	Winning party
Witnesham	31 July 2008	Conservative	Conservative
Riverside	18 September 2008	Conservative	Conservative
Felixstowe South East	4 June 2009	Conservative	Conservative
Walberswick & Wenhaston	9 September 2009	Conservative	Conservative
Kesgrave East	9 February 2012	Conservative	Conservative
Leiston	19 May 2018	Conservative	Conservative
Wenhaston & Westleton	20 September 2018	Conservative	Conservative
