= Rushmere St Andrew =

Village in Suffolk, England

Coordinates: 52.066°N 1.213°E

Rushmere St. Andrew
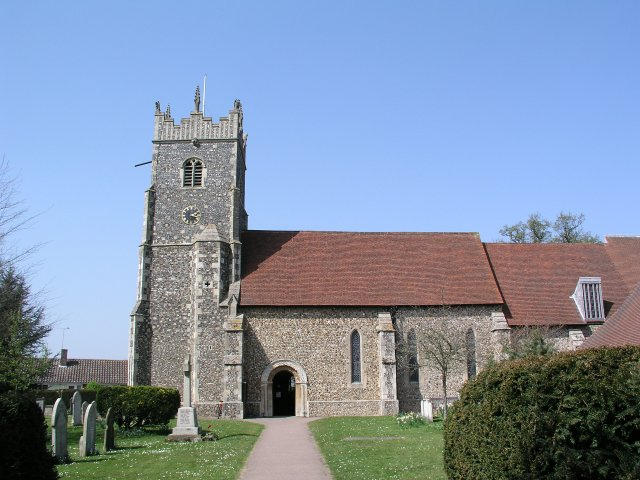
- St Andrew's church

- Location within Suffolk
- Population: 6,185 (2011 Census)
- District: East Suffolk
- Shire county: Suffolk
- Region: East
- Country: England
- Sovereign state: United Kingdom
- Post town: IPSWICH
- Postcode district: IP4, IP5
- Dialling code: 01473
- UK Parliament: Central Suffolk and North Ipswich

Rushmere St Andrew is a village, civil parish and electoral ward adjacent to part of the eastern edge of the borough of Ipswich in the East Suffolk district of Suffolk, England. The parish includes most of Rushmere Heath and parts of the Ipswich suburb of Broke Hall as well as the village of Rushmere St. Andrew, from which it draws its name. The parish was formed in 1894 from the rural part of the parish of Rushmere.

== Rushmere Common ==
Rushmere Common, also known locally as Rushmere Heath, is a large area of common land which dominates much of the south-east of the parish. Home to the Rushmere Golf Club and bordered by Playford Road, Camberley Road, Tasmania Road, the Broke Hall Estate and Kesgrave, the common is an area enjoyed by walkers and cyclists alike, who take advantage of its wide open spaces and footpaths – including the Sandlings Walk, which starts on the common and ends in Southwold 60 miles away on the north Suffolk coast.

== Sport ==
The village is home to a number of sports clubs and associations and was for many years a base for a number of the sports and social clubs of local businesses, such as Willis Faber (now Ipswich School Sports Centre - Rushmere) and Crane Fluid Systems Sports and Social Club (now part of the Ipswich Town F.C. training and academy complex). Ipswich Rugby Club and Ipswich YM RUFC are also in the parish, along with Ipswich Wanderers Football Club.

== Politics ==
=== East Suffolk District Council ===
Since 1 April 2019 Rushmere St Andrew returns one councillor to East Suffolk District Council.

Date	Councillor
2019	Mark Newton

=== Suffolk Coastal District Council ===
Results following the ward change of 2003 to 2011. There were three seats during this period. The ward did not exist during the 2015 Suffolk Coastal District Council election. There were three seats during this period.

Date	Councillor	Councillor	Councillor
2003	Dennis Gooch	Gordon Laing	Robert Whiting
2007	Dennis Gooch	Gordon Laing	Robert Whiting
2011	Robert Whiting	John Withey	Mark Newton

=== Woodbridge Urban District Council ===
As a result of the Local Government Act 1894 – which introduced Rural and Urban District Councils – Rushmere St Andrew was a ward of Woodbridge Urban District.

== Notable residents ==
- Robert Lacey Everett (1833-1916), farmer, Liberal politician, and Member of Parliament for Woodbridge
