= 1991 Suffolk Coastal District Council election =

District Council election

- 2 May 1991

All 55 seats to Suffolk Coastal District Council 28 seats needed for a majority

	First party	Second party
Party	Conservative	Independent
Seats won	36	9
Seat change	▼3	Steady
Popular vote	24,788	3,601
Percentage	48.2%	7.0%
Swing	▼1.9%	▼2.7%
	Third party	Fourth party
Party	Labour	Liberal Democrats
Seats won	7	3
Seat change	▲6	▼3
Popular vote	12,756	8,497
Percentage	24.8%	16.5%
Swing	▲12.8%	▼8.9%
- Winner of each seat at the 1991 Suffolk Coastal District Council election.
Control before election
Conservative
Control after election
Conservative

The 1991 Suffolk Coastal District Council election took place on 2 May 1991 to elect members of Suffolk Coastal District Council in Suffolk, England. This was on the same day as other local elections.

== Summary ==
=== Election result ===
1991 Suffolk Coastal District Council election
Party	Candidates	Seats	Gains	Losses	Net gain/loss	Seats %	Votes %	Votes	+/−
Conservative	48	36	2	6	▼3	65.5	48.2	24,788	–1.9
Independent	12	9	2	3	Steady	16.4	7.0	3,601	–2.7
Labour	41	7	6	0	▲6	12.7	24.8	12,756	+12.8
Liberal Democrats	23	3	2	5	▼3	5.5	16.5	8,497	–8.9
Green	6	0	0	0	Steady	0.0	2.3	1,200	+0.7
Communist	1	0	0	0	Steady	0.0	1.2	634	–0.1

== Ward results ==
Incumbent councillors standing for re-election are marked with an asterisk (*). Changes in seats do not take into account by-elections or defections.

=== Aldeburgh ===
Aldeburgh (2 seats)
Party	Candidate	Votes	%	±%
Conservative	J. Richardson	507	36.6	
Conservative	C. Wood*	494	35.7	
Independent	H. Herbert-Jones	451	32.6	
Liberal Democrats	C. Cowan	409	29.6	
Independent	S. Hawes	249	18.0	
Labour	T. Duffell	206	14.9	
Green	C. Robinson	185	13.4	
Turnout		~1,384	56.6	
Registered electors		2,445		
Conservative hold				
Conservative hold				

=== Alderton & Sutton ===
Alderton & Sutton
Party	Candidate	Votes	%	±%
Conservative	R. Peacock*	227	44.4	
Liberal Democrats	P. Monk	204	39.9	
Labour	C. Hemming	80	15.7	
Majority		23	4.5	
Turnout		511	55.0	
Registered electors		929		
Conservative hold		Swing		

=== Bealings ===
Bealings
Party	Candidate	Votes	%	±%
Conservative	I. Jowers*	556	74.3	
Labour	G. Driver	192	25.7	
Majority		364	48.6	
Turnout		748	52.8	
Registered electors		1,418		
Conservative hold		Swing		

=== Bramfield & Cratfield ===
Bramfield & Cratfield
Party	Candidate	Votes	%	±%
Conservative	R. Church	397	59.6	
Labour	J. Troughton	269	40.4	
Majority		128	19.2	
Turnout		666	46.6	
Registered electors		1,429		
Conservative hold		Swing		

=== Buxlow ===
Buxlow
Party	Candidate	Votes	%	±%
Liberal Democrats	W. Moss	508	70.5	
Labour	S. Monk	213	29.5	
Majority		295	41.0	
Turnout		721	40.7	
Registered electors		1,771		
Liberal Democrats gain from Independent		Swing		

=== Dennington ===
Dennington
Party	Candidate	Votes	%	±%
Independent	R. Wardley*	Unopposed		
Registered electors		1,265		
Independent hold				

=== Earl Soham ===
Earl Soham
Party	Candidate	Votes	%	±%
Independent	N. Woodcock*	493	75.3	
Liberal Democrats	P. Booth	162	24.7	
Majority		331	50.6	
Turnout		655	55.0	
Registered electors		1,191		
Independent hold		Swing		

=== Felixstowe Central ===
Felixstowe Central (2 seats)
Party	Candidate	Votes	%	±%
Conservative	R. Holland*	751	50.6	
Conservative	C. Webb*	749	50.5	
Labour	C. Bignell	439	29.6	
Labour	D. Steward	402	27.1	
Turnout		~1,170	56.7	
Registered electors		2,064		
Conservative hold				
Conservative hold				

=== Felixstowe East ===
Felixstowe East (2 seats)
Party	Candidate	Votes	%	±%
Conservative	B. Clarke*	869	52.9	
Conservative	E. Race*	761	46.3	
Liberal Democrats	A. Houseley	516	31.4	
Liberal Democrats	P. Warren	483	29.4	
Labour	H. Sweetman	194	11.8	
Labour	R. McGrath	188	11.4	
Turnout		~1,567	52.3	
Registered electors		2,995		
Conservative hold				
Conservative hold				

=== Felixstowe North ===
Felixstowe North (2 seats)
Party	Candidate	Votes	%	±%
Labour	M. Deacon*	775	45.0	
Labour	R. Stoddart	619	35.9	
Conservative	R. Norman	471	27.3	
Conservative	M. Stokell	439	25.5	
Liberal Democrats	A. Cousins	376	21.8	
Liberal Democrats	M. Ninnmey	273	15.8	
Turnout		~1,621	55.8	
Registered electors		2,905		
Labour gain from Conservative				
Labour gain from Conservative				

=== Felixstowe South ===
Felixstowe South (2 seats)
Party	Candidate	Votes	%	±%
Conservative	D. Savage*	671	45.0	
Conservative	J. Fountain	523	35.1	
Liberal Democrats	C. Macgregor	360	24.1	
Independent	M. Eyton	193	12.9	
Labour	M. Walker	191	12.8	
Turnout		~1,128	42.9	
Registered electors		2,630		
Conservative hold				
Conservative gain from Independent				

=== Felixstowe South East ===
Felixstowe South East (2 seats)
Party	Candidate	Votes	%	±%
Conservative	C. Slemmings	987	55.6	
Conservative	A. Smith	986	55.5	
Labour	D. Carpenter	434	24.4	
Labour	M. Wyatt	415	23.4	
Turnout		~1,411	48.1	
Registered electors		2,935		
Conservative hold				
Conservative hold				

=== Felixstowe West ===
Felixstowe West (2 seats)
Party	Candidate	Votes	%	±%
Liberal Democrats	H. Dangerfield	530	37.0	
Labour	S. Erlam	501	35.0	
Liberal Democrats	D. Golightly	493	34.4	
Labour	R. Whitworth	459	32.0	
Conservative	J. Dyer	400	28.0	
Conservative	A. Malster	381	26.6	
Turnout		~1,478	39.4	
Registered electors		3,750		
Liberal Democrats hold				
Labour gain from Liberal Democrats				

=== Framlingham ===
Framlingham
Party	Candidate	Votes	%	±%
Labour	J. Campbell	499	46.4	
Conservative	J. Bowers	460	42.8	
Green	J. Holloway	117	10.9	
Majority		39	3.6	
Turnout		1,076	51.3	
Registered electors		2,097		
Labour gain from Conservative		Swing		

=== Glemham ===
Glemham
Party	Candidate	Votes	%	±%
Conservative	H. Brookes*	341	73.0	
Labour	L. Chamberlain	126	27.0	
Majority		215	46.0	
Turnout		467	52.2	
Registered electors		895		
Conservative hold		Swing		

=== Grundisburgh & Witnesham ===
Grundisburgh & Witnesham
Party	Candidate	Votes	%	±%
Conservative	M. Morton*	Unopposed		
Registered electors		1,804		
Conservative hold				

=== Hasketon ===
Hasketon
Party	Candidate	Votes	%	±%
Conservative	P. Preese	310	50.0	
Liberal Democrats	D. Ball	244	39.4	
Labour	S. Troughton	66	10.6	
Majority		66	10.6	
Turnout		620	48.1	
Registered electors		1,290		
Conservative hold		Swing		

=== Hollesley ===
Hollesley
Party	Candidate	Votes	%	±%
Conservative	M. Shannon*	435	65.6	
Labour	A. Hemming	134	20.2	
Green	V. Mason	94	14.2	
Majority		301	45.4	
Turnout		663	59.8	
Registered electors		1,109		
Conservative hold		Swing		

=== Kelsale ===
Kelsale
Party	Candidate	Votes	%	±%
Independent	N. Ratcliff*	264	48.3	
Conservative	R. Berendt	188	34.4	
Labour	J. Poppleton	95	17.4	
Majority		76	13.9	
Turnout		547	52.4	
Registered electors		1,043		
Independent gain from Liberal Democrats		Swing		

=== Kesgrave ===
Kesgrave (3 seats)
Party	Candidate	Votes	%	±%
Conservative	H. Ferguson	845	56.6	
Conservative	C. Dowsing*	829	55.5	
Conservative	P. Cooper*	778	52.1	
Labour	A. Kelly	531	35.6	
Labour	M. Irwin	452	30.3	
Turnout		~1,494	38.2	
Registered electors		3,910		
Conservative hold				
Conservative hold				
Conservative hold				

=== Kirton ===
Kirton
Party	Candidate	Votes	%	±%
Independent	J. Metcalfe*	594	70.4	
Conservative	S. Corker	187	22.2	
Labour	M. Campbell	63	7.5	
Majority		407	48.2	
Turnout		844	51.7	
Registered electors		1,631		
Independent hold		Swing		

=== Leiston ===
Leiston (3 seats)
Party	Candidate	Votes	%	±%
Labour	T. Hodgson*	990	35.0	
Labour	J. Girling	921	32.6	
Conservative	J. Geater*	767	27.1	
Conservative	T. Hawkins*	698	24.7	
Communist	W. Howard	634	22.4	
Green	M. Burnside	495	17.5	
Conservative	J. Hurn	436	15.4	
Turnout		~1,982	50.5	
Registered electors		3,926		
Labour hold				
Labour gain from Conservative				
Conservative hold				

=== Martlesham ===
Martlesham
Party	Candidate	Votes	%	±%
Conservative	B. Hollingsworth	866	45.9	
Liberal Democrats	J. Kelso*	826	43.8	
Labour	A. Pitcher	193	10.2	
Majority		40	2.1	
Turnout		1,885	52.1	
Registered electors		3,619		
Conservative gain from Liberal Democrats		Swing		

=== Melton ===
Melton
Party	Candidate	Votes	%	±%
Independent	M. Hutchinson	Unopposed		
Registered electors		2,317		
Independent hold				

=== Nacton ===
Nacton
Party	Candidate	Votes	%	±%
Conservative	J. Law*	576	73.1	
Labour	D. Goddard	212	26.9	
Majority		364	46.2	
Turnout		788	44.6	
Registered electors		1,767		
Conservative hold		Swing		

=== Orford ===
Orford
Party	Candidate	Votes	%	±%
Independent	M. Fairweather*	412	69.8	
Conservative	P. Vanneck	178	30.2	
Majority		234	39.6	
Turnout		590	63.0	
Registered electors		936		
Independent gain from Liberal Democrats		Swing		

=== Otley ===
Otley
Party	Candidate	Votes	%	±%
Conservative	V. Sutton*	248	46.6	
Liberal Democrats	D. Yule	223	41.9	
Labour	G. Taylor	61	11.5	
Majority		25	4.7	
Turnout		532	52.7	
Registered electors		1,010		
Conservative hold		Swing		

=== Rushmere St. Andrew ===
Rushmere St. Andrew (2 seats)
Party	Candidate	Votes	%	±%
Conservative	D. Gooch*	802	49.3	
Conservative	G. Laing*	755	46.4	
Liberal Democrats	D. Copper	666	40.9	
Turnout		~1,445	45.6	
Registered electors		3,170		
Conservative hold				
Conservative hold				

=== Saxmundham ===
Saxmundham
Party	Candidate	Votes	%	±%
Conservative	R. Warren	303	39.0	
Labour	K. Welton	285	36.7	
Liberal Democrats	J. Barnes	189	24.3	
Majority		18	2.3	
Turnout		777	50.5	
Registered electors		1,538		
Conservative gain from Independent		Swing		

=== Snape ===
Snape
Party	Candidate	Votes	%	±%
Conservative	K. Burnett*	347	63.9	
Labour	H. Blackshaw	196	36.1	
Majority		151	27.8	
Turnout		543	48.0	
Registered electors		1,132		
Conservative hold		Swing		

=== Trimleys ===
Trimleys (2 seats)
Party	Candidate	Votes	%	±%
Conservative	B. Carrick-Spreat*	740	40.3	
Conservative	D. Donnelly*	723	39.4	
Labour	M. Dixon	701	38.2	
Liberal Democrats	A. Marfleet	507	27.6	
Labour	C. Thompson	484	26.4	
Turnout		~1,831	42.5	
Registered electors		4,306		
Conservative hold				
Conservative hold				

=== Tunstall ===
Tunstall
Party	Candidate	Votes	%	±%
Conservative	R. Herring*	343	57.8	
Liberal Democrats	J. Monk	250	42.2	
Majority		93	15.6	
Turnout		593	59.7	
Registered electors		994		
Conservative hold		Swing		

=== Ufford ===
Ufford
Party	Candidate	Votes	%	±%
Conservative	H. Fooks*	332	57.0	
Liberal Democrats	P. Hazell	250	43.0	
Majority		82	14.0	
Turnout		582	47.0	
Registered electors		1,237		
Conservative hold		Swing		

=== Walberswick ===
Walberswick
Party	Candidate	Votes	%	±%
Conservative	R. Leighton	383	46.1	
Liberal Democrats	A. Block	350	42.2	
Labour	H. Buck	97	11.7	
Majority		33	3.9	
Turnout		830	58.9	
Registered electors		1,410		
Conservative hold		Swing		

=== Westleton ===
Westleton
Party	Candidate	Votes	%	±%
Independent	B. Caines*	378	64.0	
Green	J. Barnett	213	36.0	
Majority		165	28.0	
Turnout		591	52.3	
Registered electors		1,129		
Independent hold		Swing		

=== Wickham Market ===
Wickham Market
Party	Candidate	Votes	%	±%
Independent	P. Mason*	418	63.5	
Labour	K. Doran	144	21.9	
Green	M. Cousens	96	14.6	
Majority		274	41.6	
Turnout		658	39.7	
Registered electors		1,658		
Independent hold		Swing		

=== Woodbridge Central ===
Woodbridge Central
Party	Candidate	Votes	%	±%
Conservative	G. Thornhill*	459	69.2	
Labour	A. Murray	204	30.8	
Majority		255	38.4	
Turnout		663	45.9	
Registered electors		1,445		
Conservative hold		Swing		

=== Woodbridge Farlingaye ===
Woodbridge Farlingaye
Party	Candidate	Votes	%	±%
Liberal Democrats	A. Healey	323	49.7	
Conservative	R. Perry	203	31.2	
Labour	P. Buck	124	19.1	
Majority		120	18.5	
Turnout		650	44.0	
Registered electors		1,477		
Liberal Democrats gain from Conservative		Swing		

=== Woodbridge Kyson ===
Woodbridge Kyson
Party	Candidate	Votes	%	±%
Labour	R. Burgon	201	45.1	
Independent	L. Spencer	149	33.4	
Liberal Democrats	N. Green	96	21.5	
Majority		52	11.7	
Turnout		446	53.1	
Registered electors		840		
Labour gain from Liberal Democrats		Swing		

=== Woodbridge Riverside ===
Woodbridge Riverside
Party	Candidate	Votes	%	±%
Conservative	M. Rowland*	440	75.1	
Labour	M. Arundel	146	24.9	
Majority		294	50.2	
Turnout		586	52.2	
Registered electors		1,123		
Conservative hold		Swing		

=== Woodbridge Seckford ===
Woodbridge Seckford
Party	Candidate	Votes	%	±%
Conservative	R. Geen*	279	46.0	
Liberal Democrats	M. Evelegh	259	42.7	
Labour	R. Horabin	68	11.2	
Majority		20	3.3	
Turnout		606	54.3	
Registered electors		1,115		
Conservative hold		Swing		

=== Yoxford ===
Yoxford
Party	Candidate	Votes	%	±%
Conservative	D. Gray	368	66.4	
Labour	N. Croft	186	33.6	
Majority		182	32.8	
Turnout		554	47.6	
Registered electors		1,163		
Conservative hold		Swing		

== By-elections ==
=== Orford ===
Orford by-election: 9 April 1992
Party	Candidate	Votes	%	±%
Liberal Democrats		361	50.7	
Conservative		280	39.3	
Labour		71	10.0	
Majority		81	11.4	
Turnout		712	76.1	
Registered electors		936		
Liberal Democrats gain from Independent		Swing		

=== Felixstowe West ===
Felixstowe West by-election: 4 February 1993
Party	Candidate	Votes	%	±%
Liberal Democrats		442	49.2	
Labour		273	30.4	
Conservative		184	20.5	
Majority		169	18.8	
Turnout		899	24.0	
Registered electors		3,746		
Liberal Democrats gain from Labour		Swing		

=== Dennington ===
Dennington by-election: 24 March 1994
Party	Candidate	Votes	%	±%
Independent		246	45.8	
Liberal Democrats		242	45.1	
Labour		36	6.7	
Green		13	2.4	
Majority		4	0.7	
Turnout		537	42.4	
Registered electors		1,267		
Independent hold		Swing		

=== Otley ===
Otley by-election: 24 March 1994
Party	Candidate	Votes	%	±%
Liberal Democrats		249	57.5	
Conservative		137	31.6	
Labour		47	10.9	
Majority		112	25.9	
Turnout		433	42.9	
Registered electors		1,009		
Liberal Democrats gain from Conservative		Swing		
