= 2003 Suffolk Coastal District Council election =

2003 UK local government election

- 1 May 2003

All 55 seats to Suffolk Coastal District Council 28 seats needed for a majority

	First party	Second party
Party	Conservative	Liberal Democrats
Seats won	43	10
Seat change	▲7	Steady
Popular vote	24,149	15,540
Percentage	49.8%	32.0%
Swing	▲3.2%	▲11.1%
	Third party	Fourth party
Party	Labour	Independent
Seats won	2	0
Seat change	▼6	▼1
Popular vote	6,715	285
Percentage	13.8%	0.6%
Swing	▼14.8%	▼3.3%
- Winner of each seat at the 2003 Suffolk Coastal District Council election.
Control before election
Conservative
Control after election
Conservative

The 2003 Suffolk Coastal District Council election took place on 1 May 2003 to elect members of Suffolk Coastal District Council in Suffolk, England. This was on the same day as other local elections.

== Summary ==
=== Election result ===
2003 Suffolk Coastal District Council election
Party	Candidates	Seats	Gains	Losses	Net gain/loss	Seats %	Votes %	Votes	+/−
Conservative	55	43	N/A	N/A	▲7	78.2	49.8	24,149	+3.2
Liberal Democrats	40	10	N/A	N/A	Steady	18.2	32.0	15,540	+11.1
Labour	21	2	N/A	N/A	▼6	3.6	13.8	6,715	–14.8
Green	9	0	N/A	N/A	Steady	0.0	3.1	1,501	N/A
Firefighters Against Cuts	2	0	N/A	N/A	Steady	0.0	0.6	307	N/A
Independent	2	0	N/A	N/A	▼1	0.0	0.6	285	–3.3

== Ward results ==
Incumbent councillors standing for re-election are marked with an asterisk (). Changes in seats do not take into account by-elections or defections.

=== Aldeburgh ===
Aldeburgh (2 seats)
Party	Candidate	Votes	%	±%
Conservative	Anthony Warren	826	53.0	
Conservative	Margaret Wilson	818	52.5	
Liberal Democrats	Lisabeth Hoad	609	39.1	
Liberal Democrats	Keith Dickerson	557	35.8	
Green	William Berry	131	8.4	
Turnout		~1,558	46.8	
Registered electors		3,328		
Conservative hold				
Conservative hold				

=== Earl Soham ===
Earl Soham
Party	Candidate	Votes	%	±%
Conservative	Neil Jackson	442	54.8	
Liberal Democrats	Ronald Else	289	35.9	
Green	Edward Thompson	75	9.3	
Majority		153	18.9	
Turnout		806	47.6	
Registered electors		1,696		
Conservative hold		Swing		

=== Farlingaye ===
Renamed from Woodbridge Farlingaye.

Farlingaye
Party	Candidate	Votes	%	±%
Liberal Democrats	Annabel Healey	289	49.5	
Conservative	Benjamin Redsell	193	33.0	
Labour	Thomas Guest	102	17.5	
Majority		96	16.5	
Turnout		584	37.1	
Registered electors		1,586		
Liberal Democrats hold		Swing		

=== Felixstowe East ===
Felixstowe East (2 seats)
Party	Candidate	Votes	%	±%
Conservative	Doreen Savage	936	61.8	
Conservative	Christopher Slemmings	852	56.3	
Liberal Democrats	David Houseley	395	26.1	
Liberal Democrats	Mervyn Sheppard	317	20.9	
Labour	Harriet Bennett	222	14.7	
Labour	John Mullen	201	13.3	
Turnout		~1,514	44.0	
Registered electors		3,442		
Conservative hold				
Conservative hold				

=== Felixstowe North ===
Felixstowe North (2 seats)
Party	Candidate	Votes	%	±%
Conservative	Ann Rodwell	464	38.9	
Labour	Michael Deacon	459	38.4	
Conservative	Peter Coleman	403	33.8	
Labour	Dennis Carpenter	380	31.8	
Firefighters Against Cuts	Steven Brinkley	156	13.1	
Firefighters Against Cuts	Paul Woolstenholmes	151	12.6	
Liberal Democrats	Bernard Price	132	11.1	
Liberal Democrats	Robert Sherratt	116	9.7	
Turnout		~1,194	35.6	
Registered electors		3,355		
Conservative gain from Labour				
Labour hold				

=== Felixstowe South ===
Felixstowe South (2 seats)
Party	Candidate	Votes	%	±%
Conservative	David Smith	535	43.3	
Conservative	David Bentinck	529	42.8	
Liberal Democrats	Doreen Rayner	483	39.1	
Liberal Democrats	Cherrie MacGregor	473	38.3	
Labour	Mark Campbell	187	15.1	
Labour	Stephen Tuthill	159	12.9	
Turnout		~1,235	34.9	
Registered electors		3,538		
Conservative hold				
Conservative hold				

=== Felixstowe South East ===
Felixstowe South East (2 seats)
Party	Candidate	Votes	%	±%
Conservative	Malcolm Minns	878	58.6	
Conservative	Andrew Smith	840	56.0	
Labour	Ruth Campbell	325	21.7	
Liberal Democrats	Lee Reeves	289	19.3	
Liberal Democrats	Andrew Yates	289	19.3	
Labour	Mark Knight	284	18.9	
Turnout		~1,499	39.7	
Registered electors		3,776		
Conservative hold				
Conservative hold				

=== Felixstowe West ===
Felixstowe West (3 seats)
Party	Candidate	Votes	%	±%
Liberal Democrats	Henry Dangerfield*	709	49.1	
Liberal Democrats	Doris Paddick*	685	47.5	
Liberal Democrats	Michael Ninnmey	594	41.2	
Labour	Marian Pettit	395	27.4	
Labour	Margaret Morris	382	26.5	
Labour	Peter Waller	356	24.7	
Conservative	Graham Newman	332	23.0	
Conservative	Eric Bishop	314	21.8	
Conservative	Joan Sennington	301	20.9	
Turnout		~1,443	28.1	
Registered electors		5,137		
Liberal Democrats hold				
Liberal Democrats hold				
Liberal Democrats win (new seat)				

=== Framlingham ===
Framlingham (2 seats)
Party	Candidate	Votes	%	±%
Conservative	Kenneth Musgrave	710	56.9	
Conservative	Winter Rose*	678	54.4	
Liberal Democrats	David Griffiths	459	36.8	
Liberal Democrats	Mark Baker	383	30.7	
Green	Marion Gaze	118	9.5	
Turnout		~1,247	36.2	
Registered electors		3,444		
Conservative gain from Labour				
Conservative win (new seat)				

=== Grundisburgh ===
Grundisburgh
Party	Candidate	Votes	%
Conservative	Ian Jowers*	430	68.7
Green	Elise Joiner	196	31.3
Majority		234	37.4
Turnout		626	34.0
Registered electors		1,842	
Conservative win (new seat)			

=== Hacheston ===
Hacheston
Party	Candidate	Votes	%
Conservative	Colin Hart	525	73.0
Green	Rachel Fulcher	194	27.0
Majority		331	46.0
Turnout		719	42.8
Registered electors		1,699	
Conservative win (new seat)			

=== Hollesley With Eyke ===
Hollesley With Eyke
Party	Candidate	Votes	%
Conservative	Rhona Sturrock*	402	57.3
Liberal Democrats	Vivien Mason	300	42.7
Majority		102	14.5
Turnout		702	42.1
Registered electors		1,699	
Conservative win (new seat)			

=== Kesgrave East ===
Kesgrave East (3 seats)
Party	Candidate	Votes	%
Conservative	John Klaschka	Unopposed	
Conservative	John Hammond*	Unopposed	
Conservative	Norman Bugg*	Unopposed	
Registered electors		4,624	
Conservative win (new seat)			
Conservative win (new seat)			
Conservative win (new seat)			

=== Kesgrave West ===
Kesgrave West (2 seats)
Party	Candidate	Votes	%
Liberal Democrats	Veronica Read*	418	49.5
Conservative	Robert Grimwood	406	48.1
Conservative	Jean Zoller	397	47.0
Liberal Democrats	John Briggs	365	43.2
Turnout		~844	28.1
Registered electors		3,002	
Liberal Democrats win (new seat)			
Conservative win (new seat)			

=== Kyson ===
Kyson
Party	Candidate	Votes	%	±%
Conservative	Edward Binns	243	42.9	
Labour	Roy Burgon*	141	24.9	
Liberal Democrats	Andrew Craig-Bennett	105	18.5	
Independent	John Brownsord	78	13.8	
Majority		102	18.0	
Turnout		567	35.2	
Registered electors		1,619		
Conservative gain from Labour		Swing		

=== Leiston ===
Leiston (3 seats)
Party	Candidate	Votes	%	±%
Conservative	John Geater*	758	38.2	
Conservative	Trevor Hawkins	683	34.5	
Conservative	Andrew Nunn	593	29.9	
Liberal Democrats	Jaqueline Morrissey	532	26.8	
Labour	Terence Hodgson	486	24.5	
Labour	John Troughton	417	21.0	
Independent	Robert Stroud	207	10.4	
Turnout		~1,466	30.0	
Registered electors		4,885		
Conservative hold				
Conservative hold				
Conservative gain from Labour				

=== Martlesham ===
Martlesham (2 seats)
Party	Candidate	Votes	%	±%
Liberal Democrats	John Kelso*	868	50.3	
Liberal Democrats	Rebecca Foster	674	39.0	
Conservative	Christopher Blundell	571	33.1	
Conservative	Anthony Ramsey	491	28.5	
Green	John Forbes	287	16.6	
Turnout		~1,555	39.6	
Registered electors		3,929		
Liberal Democrats hold				
Liberal Democrats win (new seat)				

=== Melton & Ufford ===
Melton & Ufford (2 seats)
Party	Candidate	Votes	%
Conservative	John Perry	748	58.2
Conservative	Paul Callaghan	663	51.7
Liberal Democrats	Geoffrey Butterwick	537	41.8
Liberal Democrats	Colin Coates	533	41.5
Turnout		~1,327	34.7
Registered electors		3,823	
Conservative win (new seat)			
Conservative win (new seat)			

=== Nacton ===
Nacton (2 seats)
Party	Candidate	Votes	%	±%
Conservative	Patricia O'Brien*	Unopposed		
Conservative	Veronica Falconer	Unopposed		
Registered electors		3,446		
Conservative hold				
Conservative win (new seat)				

=== Orford & Tunstall ===
Orford & Tunstall
Party	Candidate	Votes	%
Conservative	Raymond Herring*	514	69.4
Liberal Democrats	Peter Perren	227	30.6
Majority		287	38.8
Turnout		741	45.3
Registered electors		1,648	
Conservative win (new seat)			

=== Otley ===
Otley
Party	Candidate	Votes	%	±%
Conservative	Peter Bellfield*	500	69.6	
Liberal Democrats	Sheila Else	218	30.4	
Majority		282	39.2	
Turnout		718	40.2	
Registered electors		1,790		
Conservative hold		Swing		

=== Peasenhall ===
Peasenhall
Party	Candidate	Votes	%
Conservative	Stephen Burroughes*	373	51.4
Liberal Democrats	Raymond Andrews	197	27.2
Green	Jennifer Berry	155	21.4
Majority		176	24.2
Turnout		725	44.3
Registered electors		1,697	
Conservative win (new seat)			

=== Rendlesham ===
Rendlesham
Party	Candidate	Votes	%
Conservative	Philip Dunnett	246	61.5
Liberal Democrats	Karen Wroe	154	38.5
Majority		92	23.0
Turnout		400	26.1
Registered electors		1,533	
Conservative win (new seat)			

=== Riverside ===
Riverside
Party	Candidate	Votes	%	±%
Conservative	Clifford Cocker	393	54.0	
Liberal Democrats	Sally Bull	247	33.9	
Green	Rachel Smith-Lyte	87	12.0	
Majority		146	20.1	
Turnout		727	45.9	
Registered electors		1,648		
Conservative hold		Swing		

=== Rushmere St. Andrew ===
Rushmere St. Andrew (3 seats)
Party	Candidate	Votes	%	±%
Conservative	Robert Whiting	Unopposed		
Conservative	Dennis Gooch	Unopposed		
Conservative	Gordon Laing	Unopposed		
Registered electors		4,803		
Conservative hold				
Conservative hold				
Conservative win (new seat)				

=== Saxmundham ===
Saxmundham (2 seats)
Party	Candidate	Votes	%	±%
Conservative	Peter Batho	568	47.7	
Liberal Democrats	Marian Andrews	457	38.4	
Conservative	William Wild	435	36.5	
Liberal Democrats	Donald Tricker	347	29.1	
Labour	Kevin Welton*	252	21.2	
Labour	Edna Salmon	172	14.4	
Turnout		~1,191	34.6	
Registered electors		3,442		
Conservative gain from Labour				
Liberal Democrats win (new seat)				

=== Seckford ===
Seckford
Party	Candidate	Votes	%
Conservative	Nigel Barratt*	370	54.0
Liberal Democrats	Robert Montgomery	315	46.0
Majority		55	8.0
Turnout		685	44.7
Registered electors		1,533	
Conservative win (new seat)			

=== Snape ===
Snape
Party	Candidate	Votes	%	±%
Conservative	Cyril Fidler*	393	64.2	
Liberal Democrats	Winifred Moss	219	35.8	
Majority		174	28.4	
Turnout		612	37.9	
Registered electors		1,642		
Conservative hold		Swing		

=== Sutton ===
Sutton
Party	Candidate	Votes	%
Liberal Democrats	Christine Block*	306	52.5
Conservative	Dudley Deas	277	47.5
Majority		29	5.0
Turnout		583	43.8
Registered electors		1,329	
Liberal Democrats win (new seat)			

=== Trimleys With Kirton ===
Trimleys With Kirton (3 seats)
Party	Candidate	Votes	%
Conservative	Sherrie Green	742	42.0
Labour	Mary Dixon*	735	41.6
Conservative	James Bidwell	688	38.9
Conservative	Terence Eastman	648	36.7
Labour	Michael Pulford	550	31.1
Labour	Catherine Knight	458	25.9
Liberal Democrats	Gary Paddick	420	23.8
Liberal Democrats	Imogen Dangerfield	413	23.4
Turnout		~1,768	32.0
Registered electors		5,526	
Conservative win (new seat)			
Labour win (new seat)			
Conservative win (new seat)			

=== Walberswick & Wenhaston ===
Walberswick & Wenhaston
Party	Candidate	Votes	%
Conservative	Raeburn Leighton*	463	62.3
Liberal Democrats	Andrew Block	277	37.3
Majority		186	25.0
Turnout		743	43.2
Registered electors		1,721	
Conservative win (new seat)			

=== Wickham Market ===
Wickham Market
Party	Candidate	Votes	%	±%
Liberal Democrats	Bruan Hall*	343	60.4	
Conservative	Dorothy East	166	29.2	
Labour	Valerie Pizzey	52	9.2	
Majority		177	31.2	
Turnout		568	32.6	
Registered electors		1,741		
Liberal Democrats hold		Swing		

=== Witnesham ===
Witnesham
Party	Candidate	Votes	%
Conservative	John Leggett*	Unopposed	
Registered electors		1,606	
Conservative win (new seat)			

=== Yoxford ===
Yoxford
Party	Candidate	Votes	%	±%
Conservative	Peter Wragg*	412	61.3	
Green	John Barrett	258	38.4	
Majority		154	22.9	
Turnout		672	38.9	
Registered electors		1,728		
Conservative hold		Swing		

== By-elections ==
Yoxford By-Election 5 February 2004
Party	Candidate	Votes	%	±%
Liberal Democrats	Barry Slater	455	45.2	+45.2
Conservative		319	31.7	−29.8
BNP	Paul Goodchild	153	15.2	+15.2
Labour		80	7.9	+7.9
Majority		136	13.5	
Turnout		1,007	58.0	
Liberal Democrats gain from Conservative		Swing		

Felixstowe South By-Election 22 April 2004
Party	Candidate	Votes	%	±%
Conservative	Joan Sennington	488	39.5	−5.2
Liberal Democrats	Cherrie MacGregor	456	36.6	−3.5
Independent	Thomas Savage	168	13.4	+13.4
Labour	Margaret Morris	134	10.8	−4.7
Majority		32	2.9	
Turnout		1,246	36.2	
Conservative hold		Swing		

Woodbridge Farlingaye By-Election 10 March 2005
Party	Candidate	Votes	%	±%
Liberal Democrats		308	58.0	+8.5
Conservative		185	34.8	+1.8
Labour		38	7.2	−10.3
Majority		123	23.2	
Turnout		531	34.8	
Liberal Democrats hold		Swing		
