= 1999 Suffolk Coastal District Council election =

Local election in England

- 6 May 1999

All 55 seats to Suffolk Coastal District Council 28 seats needed for a majority

	First party	Second party
Party	Conservative	Liberal Democrats
Seats won	36	10
Seat change	▲18	▼5
Popular vote	21,846	9,797
Percentage	46.6%	20.9%
Swing	▲12.3%	▼3.2%
	Third party	Fourth party
Party	Labour	Independent
Seats won	8	1
Seat change	▼9	▼4
Popular vote	13,426	1,849
Percentage	28.6%	3.9%
Swing	▼8.3%	▼0.4%
- Winner of each seat at the 1999 Suffolk Coastal District Council election.
Control before election
No overall control
Control after election
Conservative

The 1999 Suffolk Coastal District Council election took place on 6 May 1999 to elect members of Suffolk Coastal District Council in Suffolk, England. This was on the same day as other local elections.

== Summary ==
=== Election result ===
1999 Suffolk Coastal District Council election
Party	Candidates	Seats	Gains	Losses	Net gain/loss	Seats %	Votes %	Votes	+/−
Conservative	52	36	18	0	▲18	65.5	46.6	21,846	+12.3
Liberal Democrats	30	10	3	8	▼5	18.2	20.9	9,797	–3.2
Labour	39	8	0	9	▼9	14.5	28.6	13,426	–8.3
Independent	6	1	1	5	▼4	1.8	3.9	1,849	–0.4

== Ward results ==
Incumbent councillors standing for re-election are marked with an asterisk (*). Changes in seats do not take into account by-elections or defections.

=== Aldeburgh ===
Aldeburgh (2 seats)
Party	Candidate	Votes	%	±%
Conservative	M. Steen*	748	52.8	
Conservative	J. Richardson	599	42.3	
Liberal Democrats	D. Hinves	596	42.1	
Liberal Democrats	P. Pask	591	41.7	
Turnout		~1,416	55.5	
Registered electors		2,551		
Conservative hold				
Conservative hold				

=== Alderton & Sutton ===
Alderton & Sutton
Party	Candidate	Votes	%	±%
Liberal Democrats	C. Block*	253	51.4	
Conservative	W. Fraser	170	34.6	
Labour	R. Dore	69	14.0	
Majority		83	16.9	
Turnout		492	36.9	
Registered electors		1,335		
Liberal Democrats hold		Swing		

=== Bealings ===
Bealings
Party	Candidate	Votes	%	±%
Conservative	I. Jowers*	Unopposed		
Registered electors		1,503		
Conservative hold				

=== Bramfield & Cratfield ===
Bramfield & Cratfield
Party	Candidate	Votes	%	±%
Conservative	R. Church*	449	66.9	
Labour	S. Cutler	222	33.1	
Majority		227	33.8	
Turnout		671	44.7	
Registered electors		1,502		
Conservative gain from Labour		Swing		

=== Buxlow ===
Buxlow
Party	Candidate	Votes	%	±%
Liberal Democrats	K. Dickerson	399	52.6	
Conservative	T. Hawkins	359	47.4	
Majority		40	5.2	
Turnout		758	43.9	
Registered electors		1,725		
Liberal Democrats hold		Swing		

=== Dennington ===
Dennington
Party	Candidate	Votes	%	±%
Conservative	W. Rose	297	51.2	
Liberal Democrats	A. Houseley	283	48.8	
Majority		14	2.4	
Turnout		580	38.5	
Registered electors		1,506		
Conservative gain from Liberal Democrats		Swing		

=== Earl Soham ===
Earl Soham
Party	Candidate	Votes	%	±%
Conservative	B. Kerr*	351	60.5	
Liberal Democrats	J. Eddy	229	39.5	
Majority		122	21.0	
Turnout		580	42.7	
Registered electors		1,359		
Conservative hold		Swing		

=== Felixstowe Central ===
Felixstowe Central (2 seats)
Party	Candidate	Votes	%	±%
Conservative	D. Smith	618	53.6	
Conservative	M. Stokell	588	51.0	
Labour	C. Bignell*	535	46.4	
Labour	D. Rowe*	534	46.3	
Turnout		~1,197	42.7	
Registered electors		2,803		
Conservative gain from Labour				
Conservative gain from Labour				

=== Felixstowe East ===
Felixstowe East (2 seats)
Party	Candidate	Votes	%	±%
Conservative	C. Slemmings*	668	54.2	
Conservative	C. Bentley	659	53.5	
Liberal Democrats	B. Price	300	24.3	
Labour	H. Mullen	265	21.5	
Liberal Democrats	R. Sherratt	247	20.1	
Labour	R. Pettit	238	19.3	
Turnout		~1,227	39.2	
Registered electors		3,130		
Conservative hold				
Conservative hold				

=== Felixstowe North ===
Felixstowe North (2 seats)
Party	Candidate	Votes	%	±%
Labour	M. Deacon*	720	68.4	
Labour	D. Carpenter*	569	54.1	
Conservative	M. Rawnsley	333	31.6	
Turnout		~1,032	35.6	
Registered electors		2,900		
Labour hold				
Labour hold				

=== Felixstowe South ===
Felixstowe South (2 seats)
Party	Candidate	Votes	%	±%
Conservative	D. Savage*	459	44.4	
Conservative	J. Craner	393	38.0	
Liberal Democrats	S. Dangerfield	335	32.4	
Liberal Democrats	M. Ninnmey	247	23.9	
Labour	S. Dangerfield	239	23.1	
Labour	T. Lockwood	224	21.7	
Turnout		~1,009	35.5	
Registered electors		2,844		
Conservative hold				
Conservative hold				

=== Felixstowe South East ===
Felixstowe South East (2 seats)
Party	Candidate	Votes	%	±%
Conservative	M. Minns*	801	62.3	
Conservative	A. Smith*	782	60.8	
Labour	R. Campbell	485	37.7	
Labour	M. Morris	445	34.6	
Turnout		~1,343	45.7	
Registered electors		2,937		
Conservative hold				
Conservative hold				

=== Felixstowe West ===
Felixstowe West (2 seats)
Party	Candidate	Votes	%	±%
Liberal Democrats	H. Dangerfield*	546	43.5	
Liberal Democrats	D. Paddick	463	36.9	
Labour	J. Mullen*	460	36.7	
Labour	M. Pettit	424	33.8	
Conservative	E. Bishop	248	19.8	
Turnout		~1,201	28.2	
Registered electors		4,259		
Liberal Democrats hold				
Liberal Democrats gain from Labour				

=== Framlingham ===
Framlingham
Party	Candidate	Votes	%	±%
Labour	J. Campbell*	507	53.3	
Conservative	R. Gorst Ellis	445	46.7	
Majority		62	6.6	
Turnout		952	42.6	
Registered electors		2,237		
Labour hold		Swing		

=== Glemham ===
Glemham
Party	Candidate	Votes	%	±%
Liberal Democrats	P. Howard*	209	51.2	
Conservative	P. Taverner	199	48.8	
Majority		10	2.4	
Turnout		408	40.6	
Registered electors		1,006		
Liberal Democrats hold		Swing		

=== Grundisburgh & Witnesham ===
Grundisburgh & Witnesham
Party	Candidate	Votes	%	±%
Conservative	J. Legett	348	47.2	
Liberal Democrats	G. Bull*	261	35.4	
Labour	S. Neesam	128	17.4	
Majority		87	11.8	
Turnout		737	37.1	
Registered electors		1,896		
Conservative gain from Liberal Democrats		Swing		

=== Hasketon ===
Hasketon
Party	Candidate	Votes	%	±%
Liberal Democrats	R. Else*	318	53.6	
Conservative	R. D'Arcy	275	46.4	
Majority		43	7.2	
Turnout		593	46.2	
Registered electors		1,284		
Liberal Democrats hold		Swing		

=== Hollesley ===
Hollesley
Party	Candidate	Votes	%	±%
Conservative	R. Sturrock	269	44.7	
Liberal Democrats	V. Mason*	241	40.0	
Labour	A. Murray	92	15.3	
Majority		28	4.7	
Turnout		602	47.7	
Registered electors		1,262		
Conservative gain from Liberal Democrats		Swing		

=== Kelsale ===
Kelsale
Party	Candidate	Votes	%	±%
Liberal Democrats	J. Bridson*	166	37.6	
Labour	S. Evans	143	32.4	
Conservative	A. Herring	133	30.1	
Majority		23	5.2	
Turnout		442	40.4	
Registered electors		1,094		
Liberal Democrats gain from Labour		Swing		

=== Kesgrave ===
Kesgrave (3 seats)
Party	Candidate	Votes	%	±%
Conservative	J. Hammond	780	44.6	
Conservative	P. Cooper	766	43.8	
Independent	V. Read	724	41.4	
Labour	L. Compton	721	41.2	
Labour	P. Whitby	578	33.0	
Labour	P. Widdowson	464	26.5	
Independent	R. Grimwood	371	21.2	
Turnout		~1,750	26.3	
Registered electors		6,658		
Conservative hold				
Conservative gain from Labour				
Independent gain from Labour				

=== Kirton ===
Kirton
Party	Candidate	Votes	%	±%
Conservative	P. O'Brien	333	51.4	
Liberal Democrats	N. Condick	315	48.6	
Majority		18	2.8	
Turnout		648	38.6	
Registered electors		1,679		
Conservative gain from Independent		Swing		

=== Leiston ===
Leiston (3 seats)
Party	Candidate	Votes	%	±%
Conservative	J. Geater	692	53.1	
Conservative	G. Harris	660	50.6	
Labour	M. Taylor*	611	46.9	
Labour	J. Girling*	593	45.5	
Conservative	G. Hawkins	556	42.7	
Labour	T. Hodgson*	500	38.4	
Turnout		~1,454	35.7	
Registered electors		4,073		
Conservative gain from Labour				
Conservative gain from Labour				
Labour hold				

=== Martlesham ===
Martlesham
Party	Candidate	Votes	%	±%
Liberal Democrats	J. Kelso*	787	52.6	
Conservative	J. Webber	536	35.8	
Labour	S. Huntington	173	11.6	
Majority		251	16.8	
Turnout		1,496	36.7	
Registered electors		4,074		
Liberal Democrats hold		Swing		

=== Melton ===
Melton
Party	Candidate	Votes	%	±%
Conservative	P. Warbrugh	573	59.3	
Labour	C. Place	394	40.7	
Majority		179	18.6	
Turnout		967	35.3	
Registered electors		2,743		
Conservative gain from Independent		Swing		

=== Nacton ===
Nacton
Party	Candidate	Votes	%	±%
Conservative	C. Snow	498	50.7	
Independent	T. Voelcker	484	49.3	
Majority		14	1.4	
Turnout		982	37.3	
Registered electors		2,635		
Conservative gain from Liberal Democrats		Swing		

=== Orford ===
Orford
Party	Candidate	Votes	%	±%
Conservative	J. Skepper	214	40.9	
Liberal Democrats	P. Perren	176	33.7	
Independent	D. Worne	133	25.4	
Majority		38	7.2	
Turnout		523	50.0	
Registered electors		1,046		
Conservative gain from Liberal Democrats		Swing		

=== Otley ===
Otley
Party	Candidate	Votes	%	±%
Conservative	P. Bellfield	272	54.0	
Liberal Democrats	A. Barrett*	166	32.9	
Labour	E. Middleton	66	13.1	
Majority		106	21.1	
Turnout		504	44.7	
Registered electors		1,127		
Conservative gain from Liberal Democrats		Swing		

=== Rushmere St. Andrew ===
Rushmere St. Andrew (2 seats)
Party	Candidate	Votes	%	±%
Conservative	G. Laing*	847	58.5	
Conservative	R. Whiting	791	54.7	
Liberal Democrats	D. Cooper*	643	44.4	
Liberal Democrats	C. Kelso	500	34.5	
Turnout		~1,447	32.4	
Registered electors		4,463		
Conservative hold				
Conservative gain from Liberal Democrats				

=== Saxmundham ===
Saxmundham
Party	Candidate	Votes	%	±%
Labour	K. Welton*	317	39.7	
Liberal Democrats	M. Andrews	250	31.3	
Conservative	R. Warren	230	28.8	
Majority		67	8.4	
Turnout		798	39.9	
Registered electors		1,999		
Labour hold		Swing		

=== Snape ===
Snape
Party	Candidate	Votes	%	±%
Conservative	C. Fidler	310	56.0	
Labour	G. Cable	244	44.0	
Majority		66	12.0	
Turnout		554	42.2	
Registered electors		1,314		
Conservative hold		Swing		

=== Trimleys ===
Trimleys (2 seats)
Party	Candidate	Votes	%	±%
Labour	M. Dixon*	742	54.4	
Labour	H. Blackshaw*	641	47.0	
Conservative	F. Stennet	561	41.1	
Conservative	J. Barker	546	40.1	
Turnout		~1,363	31.2	
Registered electors		4,367		
Labour hold				
Labour hold				

=== Tunstall ===
Tunstall
Party	Candidate	Votes	%	±%
Conservative	R. Herring*	508	70.7	
Liberal Democrats	K. Johnston	210	29.2	
Majority		298	41.5	
Turnout		719	36.9	
Registered electors		1,948		
Conservative hold		Swing		

=== Ufford ===
Ufford
Party	Candidate	Votes	%	±%
Conservative	D. Franks*	466	78.1	
Labour	F. Bright	131	21.9	
Majority		335	56.2	
Turnout		597	45.9	
Registered electors		1,300		
Conservative hold		Swing		

=== Walberswick ===
Walberswick
Party	Candidate	Votes	%	±%
Conservative	R. Leighton*	Unopposed		
Registered electors		1,322		
Conservative hold				

=== Westleton ===
Westleton
Party	Candidate	Votes	%	±%
Conservative	H. McCulloch	Unopposed		
Registered electors		1,177		
Conservative gain from Independent				

=== Wickham Market ===
Wickham Market
Party	Candidate	Votes	%	±%
Liberal Democrats	B. Hall	227	39.5	
Labour	V. Pizzey	106	18.5	
Conservative	S. Caulfield	104	18.1	
Independent	D. East	79	13.8	
Independent	M. Manning	58	10.1	
Majority		21	3.7	
Turnout		574	31.8	
Registered electors		1,804		
Liberal Democrats gain from Independent		Swing		

=== Woodbridge Central ===
Woodbridge Central
Party	Candidate	Votes	%	±%
Conservative	N. Barratt	309	44.2	
Liberal Democrats	R. Montgomery	232	33.2	
Labour	M. Caddick	158	22.6	
Majority		77	11.0	
Turnout		699	49.3	
Registered electors		1,419		
Conservative gain from Liberal Democrats		Swing		

=== Woodbridge Farlingaye ===
Woodbridge Farlingaye
Party	Candidate	Votes	%	±%
Liberal Democrats	A. Healey*	216	45.9	
Conservative	C. Nunn	148	31.4	
Labour	K. Bryant	107	22.7	
Majority		68	14.5	
Turnout		471	31.6	
Registered electors		1,489		
Liberal Democrats hold		Swing		

=== Woodbridge Kyson ===
Woodbridge Kyson
Party	Candidate	Votes	%	±%
Labour	R. Burgon*	218	61.1	
Conservative	E. Binns	139	38.9	
Majority		79	22.2	
Turnout		357	37.5	
Registered electors		953		
Labour hold		Swing		

=== Woodbridge Riverside ===
Woodbridge Riverside
Party	Candidate	Votes	%	±%
Conservative	S. Hewitt*	288	50.8	
Liberal Democrats	S. Bull	213	37.6	
Labour	M. Arundel	66	11.6	
Majority		75	13.2	
Turnout		567	49.3	
Registered electors		1,151		
Conservative hold		Swing		

=== Woodbridge Seckford ===
Woodbridge Seckford
Party	Candidate	Votes	%	±%
Conservative	R. Geen*	253	50.7	
Liberal Democrats	D. Ball	178	35.7	
Labour	R. Davis	68	13.6	
Majority		75	15.0	
Turnout		499	43.7	
Registered electors		1,143		
Conservative hold		Swing		

=== Yoxford ===
Yoxford
Party	Candidate	Votes	%	±%
Conservative	P. Wragg	275	54.6	
Labour	J. Stringer	229	45.4	
Majority		46	9.2	
Turnout		504	42.8	
Registered electors		1,177		
Conservative gain from Independent		Swing		

== By-elections ==
=== Bramfield & Cratfield ===
Bramfield & Cratfield by-election: 4 May 2000
Party	Candidate	Votes	%	±%
Conservative		354	55.4	
Liberal Democrats		179	28.0	
Labour		106	16.6	
Majority		175	27.4	
Turnout		639	40.0	
Registered electors		1,598		
Conservative hold		Swing		

=== Felixstowe South ===
Felixstowe South by-election: 26 October 2000
Party	Candidate	Votes	%	±%
Conservative		384	48.0	
Liberal Democrats		320	40.0	
Labour		96	12.0	
Majority		64	8.0	
Turnout		800	28.3	
Registered electors		2,827		
Conservative hold		Swing		

=== Framlingham ===
Framlingham by-election: 7 June 2001
Party	Candidate	Votes	%	±%
Conservative		805	51.7	
Labour		751	48.3	
Majority		54	3.4	
Turnout		1,556	66.6	
Registered electors		2,336		
Conservative gain from Labour		Swing		

=== Nacton ===
Nacton by-election: 20 September 2001
Party	Candidate	Votes	%	±%
Conservative		Unopposed		
Registered electors		N/A		
Conservative hold				

=== Kesgrave ===
Kesgrave by-election: 20 September 2001
Party	Candidate	Votes	%	±%
Conservative		565	75.6	
Independent		182	24.4	
Majority		383	51.2	
Turnout		747	13.5	
Registered electors		5,533		
Conservative hold		Swing		
