= 1987 Suffolk Coastal District Council election =

Local election in England

- 7 May 1987

All 55 seats to Suffolk Coastal District Council 28 seats needed for a majority

	First party	Second party
Party	Conservative	Independent
Seats won	39	9
Seat change	▼5	Steady
Popular vote	24,465	4,716
Percentage	50.1%	9.7%
Swing	▼3.4%	▼3.7%
	Third party	Fourth party
Party	Alliance	Labour
Seats won	6	1
Seat change	▲6	▼1
Popular vote	12,393	5,862
Percentage	25.4%	12.0%
Swing	▲14.8%	▼9.1%
- Winner of each seat at the 1987 Suffolk Coastal District Council election.
Control before election
Conservative
Control after election
Conservative

The 1987 Suffolk Coastal District Council election took place on 7 May 1987 to elect members of Suffolk Coastal District Council in Suffolk, England. This was on the same day as other local elections.

== Summary ==
=== Election result ===
1987 Suffolk Coastal District Council election
Party	Candidates	Seats	Gains	Losses	Net gain/loss	Seats %	Votes %	Votes	+/−
Conservative	46	39	1	6	▼5	70.9	50.1	24,465	–3.4
Independent	17	9	1	1	Steady	16.4	9.7	4,716	–3.7
Alliance	32	6	6	0	▲6	10.9	25.4	12,393	+14.8
Labour	26	1	0	1	▼1	1.8	12.0	5,862	–9.1
Green	4	0	0	0	Steady	0.0	1.6	777	N/A
Communist	1	0	0	0	Steady	0.0	1.3	622	–0.6

== Ward results ==
Incumbent councillors standing for re-election are marked with an asterisk (*). Changes in seats do not take into account by-elections or defections.

=== Aldeburgh ===
Aldeburgh (2 seats)
Party	Candidate	Votes	%	±%
Conservative	H. Codney	752	54.9	
Conservative	C. Wood	680	49.7	
Alliance	E. Cooke-Yarborough	559	40.8	
Alliance	J. Jacob	525	38.3	
Turnout		~1,369	54.3	
Registered electors		2,522		
Conservative hold				
Conservative hold				

=== Alderton & Sutton ===
Alderton & Sutton
Party	Candidate	Votes	%	±%
Conservative	R. Peacock	273	59.0	
Alliance	P. Monk	158	34.1	
Independent	F. Brown	32	6.9	
Majority		115	24.9	
Turnout		463	49.4	
Registered electors		940		
Conservative hold		Swing		

=== Bealings ===
Bealings
Party	Candidate	Votes	%	±%
Conservative	F. Sledmere	Unopposed		
Registered electors		1,480		
Conservative hold				

=== Bramfield & Cratfield ===
Bramfield & Cratfield
Party	Candidate	Votes	%	±%
Conservative	S. Burroughes	475	69.0	
Labour	J. Poppleton	213	31.0	
Majority		262	38.0	
Turnout		688	46.1	
Registered electors		1,511		
Conservative hold		Swing		

=== Buxlow ===
Buxlow
Party	Candidate	Votes	%	±%
Independent	M. Wright	Unopposed		
Registered electors		1,684		
Independent hold				

=== Dennington ===
Dennington
Party	Candidate	Votes	%	±%
Independent	R. Wardley	421	53.0	
Conservative	R. Tedder	181	22.8	
Independent	C. Green	157	19.8	
Labour	N. Croft	35	4.4	
Majority		240	30.2	
Turnout		794	63.1	
Registered electors		1,259		
Independent gain from Conservative		Swing		

=== Earl Soham ===
Earl Soham
Party	Candidate	Votes	%	±%
Independent	N. Woodcock	Unopposed		
Registered electors		1,219		
Independent hold				

=== Felixstowe Central ===
Felixstowe Central (2 seats)
Party	Candidate	Votes	%	±%
Conservative	R. Holland	661	45.4	
Conservative	C. Webb	656	45.0	
Alliance	M. Durrant	515	35.4	
Alliance	C. Morgan	498	34.2	
Labour	P. Colebourn	213	14.6	
Labour	M. Eyton	176	12.1	
Turnout		~1,456	58.0	
Registered electors		2,511		
Conservative hold				
Conservative hold				

=== Felixstowe East ===
Felixstowe East (2 seats)
Party	Candidate	Votes	%	±%
Conservative	B. Clarke	965	51.7	
Conservative	E. Race	854	45.8	
Alliance	P. Warren	717	38.4	
Alliance	M. Sheppard	657	35.2	
Independent	S. Lancastle	298	16.0	
Turnout		~1,864	63.5	
Registered electors		2,936		
Conservative hold				
Conservative hold				

=== Felixstowe North ===
Felixstowe North (2 seats)
Party	Candidate	Votes	%	±%
Conservative	C. Grayston	660	40.1	
Conservative	M. Stokell	638	38.8	
Labour	M. Deacon	602	36.6	
Labour	D. Warner	409	24.9	
Alliance	A. Cousins	348	21.2	
Alliance	L. Bowles	300	18.2	
Turnout		~1,642	56.4	
Registered electors		2,912		
Conservative hold				
Conservative gain from Labour				

=== Felixstowe South ===
Felixstowe South (2 seats)
Party	Candidate	Votes	%	±%
Conservative	D. Savage	612	51.8	
Independent	A. Loveday	611	51.7	
Conservative	E. Swift	433	36.7	
Alliance	G. Ward	360	30.5	
Turnout		~1,180	43.5	
Registered electors		2,712		
Conservative hold				
Independent hold				

=== Felixstowe South East ===
Felixstowe South East (2 seats)
Party	Candidate	Votes	%	±%
Conservative	N. Mumford	1,030	57.6	
Conservative	R. Tozer	983	54.9	
Alliance	D. Stones	509	28.5	
Alliance	J. Garwell	476	26.6	
Labour	D. Carpenter	152	8.5	
Labour	S. Manley	138	7.7	
Turnout		~1,710	60.2	
Registered electors		2,840		
Conservative hold				
Conservative hold				

=== Felixstowe West ===
Felixstowe West (2 seats)
Party	Candidate	Votes	%	±%
Alliance	D. Paddick	715	49.3	
Alliance	S. Page	586	40.4	
Conservative	T. Savage	521	35.9	
Conservative	P. Benns	466	32.1	
Labour	S. Evans	222	15.3	
Labour	D. Fallows	200	13.8	
Turnout		~1,451	48.2	
Registered electors		3,008		
Alliance gain from Conservative				
Alliance gain from Conservative				

=== Framlingham ===
Framlingham
Party	Candidate	Votes	%	±%
Conservative	J. Thirkell	482	45.8	
Labour	J. Campbell	362	34.4	
Alliance	P. Booth	134	12.7	
Green	R. Gibbons	74	7.0	
Majority		120	11.4	
Turnout		1,052	55.9	
Registered electors		1,897		
Conservative hold		Swing		

=== Glemham ===
Glemham
Party	Candidate	Votes	%	±%
Conservative	H. Brookes	266	57.6	
Alliance	C. Rooke	196	42.4	
Majority		70	15.2	
Turnout		465	54.1	
Registered electors		859		
Conservative hold		Swing		

=== Grundisburgh & Witnesham ===
Grundisburgh & Witnesham
Party	Candidate	Votes	%	±%
Conservative	M. Morton	473	62.3	
Alliance	M. Barker	286	37.7	
Majority		187	24.6	
Turnout		763	44.9	
Registered electors		1,698		
Conservative hold		Swing		

=== Hasketon ===
Hasketon
Party	Candidate	Votes	%	±%
Conservative	J. Ilett	376	59.2	
Alliance	D. Ball	259	40.8	
Majority		117	18.4	
Turnout		635	50.1	
Registered electors		1,284		
Conservative hold		Swing		

=== Hollesley ===
Hollesley
Party	Candidate	Votes	%	±%
Conservative	M. Shannon	Unopposed		
Registered electors		1,063		
Conservative hold				

=== Kelsale ===
Kelsale
Party	Candidate	Votes	%	±%
Alliance	N. Ratcliff	276	47.7	
Conservative	J. Keeble	236	40.8	
Labour	D. Todd	67	11.6	
Majority		40	6.9	
Turnout		579	57.3	
Registered electors		1,065		
Alliance gain from Conservative		Swing		

=== Kesgrave ===
Kesgrave (3 seats)
Party	Candidate	Votes	%	±%
Conservative	C. Dowsing	757	44.6	
Conservative	A. Bull	734	43.2	
Conservative	P. Cooper	710	41.8	
Alliance	R. Guest	570	33.6	
Labour	C. Northover	369	21.8	
Turnout		~1,494	53.8	
Registered electors		2,777		
Conservative hold				
Conservative hold				
Conservative hold				

=== Kirton ===
Kirton
Party	Candidate	Votes	%	±%
Independent	J. Metcalfe	Unopposed		
Registered electors		1,571		
Independent hold				

=== Leiston ===
Leiston (3 seats)
Party	Candidate	Votes	%	±%
Conservative	J. Geater	1,091	52.9	
Conservative	T. Hawkins	928	45.0	
Labour	T. Hodgson	852	41.3	
Conservative	J. Shreeve	790	38.3	
Communist	W. Howard	622	30.2	
Green	M. Burnside	489	23.7	
Independent	D. Stanley	329	16.0	
Turnout		~2,061	54.5	
Registered electors		3,782		
Conservative hold				
Conservative hold				
Labour hold				

=== Martlesham ===
Martlesham
Party	Candidate	Votes	%	±%
Alliance	J. Kelso	715	56.2	
Independent	R. Bryant	557	43.8	
Majority		158	12.4	
Turnout		1,272	42.9	
Registered electors		3,004		
Alliance gain from Conservative		Swing		

=== Melton ===
Melton
Party	Candidate	Votes	%	±%
Independent	M. Hutchison	651	77.7	
Labour	P. Buck	187	22.3	
Majority		464	55.4	
Turnout		838	41.2	
Registered electors		2,047		
Independent hold		Swing		

=== Nacton ===
Nacton
Party	Candidate	Votes	%	±%
Conservative	J. Law	493	63.9	
Alliance	D. Krailing	279	36.1	
Majority		214	27.8	
Turnout		772	51.7	
Registered electors		1,498		
Conservative hold		Swing		

=== Orford ===
Orford
Party	Candidate	Votes	%	±%
Alliance	M. Fairweather	311	52.7	
Conservative	E. Greenwell	255	43.2	
Green	C. Beardall	24	4.1	
Majority		56	9.5	
Turnout		590	63.6	
Registered electors		929		
Alliance gain from Conservative		Swing		

=== Otley ===
Otley
Party	Candidate	Votes	%	±%
Conservative	V. Sutton	281	56.1	
Independent	D. Yule	151	30.1	
Labour	E. Stott	69	13.8	
Majority		130	26.0	
Turnout		501	51.6	
Registered electors		977		
Conservative hold		Swing		

=== Rushmere St. Andrew ===
Rushmere St. Andrew (2 seats)
Party	Candidate	Votes	%	±%
Conservative	D. Gooch	922	54.1	
Conservative	G. Laing	867	50.9	
Labour	A. Mamujee	269	15.8	
Turnout		~1,705	57.3	
Registered electors		2,975		
Conservative hold				
Conservative hold				

=== Saxmundham ===
Saxmundham
Party	Candidate	Votes	%	±%
Independent	B. Fisher	371	58.6	
Labour	K. Welton	262	41.4	
Majority		109	17.2	
Turnout		633	45.4	
Registered electors		1,397		
Independent hold		Swing		

=== Snape ===
Snape
Party	Candidate	Votes	%	±%
Conservative	K. Burnett	364	60.3	
Alliance	W. Moss	186	30.8	
Independent	W. Shiells	54	8.9	
Majority		178	29.5	
Turnout		604	52.3	
Registered electors		1,166		
Conservative hold		Swing		

=== Trimleys ===
Trimleys (2 seats)
Party	Candidate	Votes	%	±%
Conservative	B. Carrick-Spreat	908	43.5	
Conservative	D. Donnelly	848	40.6	
Alliance	A. Marfleet	663	31.8	
Alliance	N. Cawthorn	562	26.9	
Labour	M. Dixon	481	23.0	
Turnout		~1,987	47.2	
Registered electors		4,211		
Conservative hold				
Conservative hold				

=== Tunstall ===
Tunstall
Party	Candidate	Votes	%	±%
Conservative	R. Herring	Unopposed		
Registered electors		923		
Conservative hold				

=== Ufford ===
Ufford
Party	Candidate	Votes	%	±%
Conservative	H. Fooks	Unopposed		
Registered electors		1,222		
Conservative hold				

=== Walberswick ===
Walberswick
Party	Candidate	Votes	%	±%
Conservative	G. James	Unopposed		
Registered electors		1,390		
Conservative hold				

=== Westleton ===
Westleton
Party	Candidate	Votes	%	±%
Independent	B. Caines	491	72.1	
Green	A. Paige	190	27.9	
Majority		301	44.2	
Turnout		681	61.1	
Registered electors		1,119		
Independent hold		Swing		

=== Wickham Market ===
Wickham Market
Party	Candidate	Votes	%	±%
Independent	P. Mason	420	70.5	
Alliance	J. Aldam	89	14.9	
Labour	V. Pizzey	87	14.6	
Majority		331	55.6	
Turnout		596	37.9	
Registered electors		1,572		
Independent hold		Swing		

=== Woodbridge Central ===
Woodbridge Central
Party	Candidate	Votes	%	±%
Conservative	G. Thornhill	405	63.9	
Alliance	G. Cavalier-Smith	164	25.9	
Labour	L. Hall	65	10.3	
Majority		241	38.0	
Turnout		634	49.5	
Registered electors		1,280		
Conservative hold		Swing		

=== Woodbridge Farlingaye ===
Woodbridge Farlingaye
Party	Candidate	Votes	%	±%
Conservative	S. Hewitt	293	50.3	
Alliance	P. Hazell	201	34.5	
Labour	B. Staines	88	15.1	
Majority		92	15.8	
Turnout		582	37.7	
Registered electors		1,543		
Conservative hold		Swing		

=== Woodbridge Kyson ===
Woodbridge Kyson
Party	Candidate	Votes	%	±%
Alliance	N. Twigge	174	39.6	
Independent	L. Spencer	173	39.4	
Labour	K. Redmond	92	21.0	
Majority		1	0.2	
Turnout		439	49.5	
Registered electors		886		
Alliance gain from Independent		Swing		

=== Woodbridge Riverside ===
Woodbridge Riverside
Party	Candidate	Votes	%	±%
Conservative	M. Rowland	408	64.7	
Alliance	E. Thompson	197	31.2	
Labour	C. Budd	26	4.1	
Majority		211	33.5	
Turnout		631	57.2	
Registered electors		1,104		
Conservative hold		Swing		

=== Woodbridge Seckford ===
Woodbridge Seckford
Party	Candidate	Votes	%	±%
Conservative	R. Geen	327	56.3	
Alliance	A. Healey	208	35.8	
Labour	H. Buck	46	7.9	
Majority		119	20.5	
Turnout		581	50.0	
Registered electors		1,161		
Conservative hold		Swing		

=== Yoxford ===
Yoxford
Party	Candidate	Votes	%	±%
Conservative	A. Hazelwood	411	69.5	
Labour	P. Merriott	180	30.5	
Majority		231	39.0	
Turnout		591	55.0	
Registered electors		1,075		
Conservative hold		Swing		

== By-elections ==
=== Felixstowe South ===
Felixstowe South by-election: 5 November 1987
Party	Candidate	Votes	%	±%
Conservative		294	33.7	
Independent		280	32.1	
Independent		173	19.8	
Labour		71	8.1	
Independent		55	6.3	
Majority		14	1.6	
Turnout		873	30	
Registered electors		2,910		
Conservative gain from Independent		Swing		

=== Felixstowe North ===
Felixstowe North by-election: 8 September 1988
Party	Candidate	Votes	%	±%
Labour		673	48.3	
Conservative		460	33.0	
Alliance		259	18.6	
Majority		213	15.3	
Turnout		1,392	43	
Registered electors		3,237		
Labour gain from Conservative		Swing		
