= 1983 Suffolk Coastal District Council election =

Local election in England

- 5 May 1983

All 55 seats to Suffolk Coastal District Council 28 seats needed for a majority

	First party	Second party	Third party
Party	Conservative	Independent	Labour
Seats won	44	9	2
Seat change	▲6	▼4	▼2
Popular vote	15,216	3,653	6,009
Percentage	53.5%	12.8%	21.1%
- Winner of each seat at the 1983 Suffolk Coastal District Council election.
Control before election
Conservative
Control after election
Conservative

The 1983 Suffolk Coastal District Council election took place on 5 May 1983 to elect members of Suffolk Coastal District Council in Suffolk, England. This was on the same day as other local elections.

The whole council was up for election on new ward boundaries, but the number of seats remained the same.

== Summary ==
=== Election result ===
1983 Suffolk Coastal District Council election
Party	Candidates	Seats	Gains	Losses	Net gain/loss	Seats %	Votes %	Votes	+/−
Conservative	47	44	N/A	N/A	▲6	80.0	53.5	15,216	
Independent	14	9	N/A	N/A	▼4	16.4	12.8	3,653	
Labour	17	2	N/A	N/A	▼2	3.6	21.1	6,009	
Alliance	11	0	N/A	N/A	Steady	0.0	10.6	3,026	
Communist	1	0	N/A	N/A	Steady	0.0	1.9	531	

23 Conservatives and 4 Independents were elected unopposed.

== Ward results ==
Changes in seats do not take into account by-elections or defections.

=== Aldeburgh ===
Aldeburgh (2 seats)
Party	Candidate	Votes	%
Conservative	G. Agate	783	73.6
Conservative	H. Cooney	717	67.4
Alliance	I. Scott	403	37.9
Turnout		~1,064	42.5
Registered electors		2,503	
Conservative win (new seat)			
Conservative win (new seat)			

=== Alderton & Sutton ===
Alderton & Sutton
Party	Candidate	Votes	%
Conservative	R. Peacock	Unopposed	
Registered electors		915	
Conservative win (new seat)			

=== Bealings ===
Bealings
Party	Candidate	Votes	%
Conservative	W. Sledmore	Unopposed	
Registered electors		1,216	
Conservative win (new seat)			

=== Bramfield & Cratfield ===
Bramfield & Cratfield
Party	Candidate	Votes	%
Conservative	S. Burroughes	Unopposed	
Registered electors		1,492	
Conservative win (new seat)			

=== Buxlow ===
Buxlow
Party	Candidate	Votes	%
Independent	M. Wright	Unopposed	
Registered electors		1,507	
Independent win (new seat)			

=== Dennington ===
Dennington
Party	Candidate	Votes	%
Conservative	J. Paice	Unopposed	
Registered electors		1,210	
Conservative win (new seat)			

=== Earl Soham ===
Earl Soham
Party	Candidate	Votes	%
Independent	N. Woodcock	Unopposed	
Registered electors		1,220	
Independent win (new seat)			

=== Felixstowe Central ===
Felixstowe Central (2 seats)
Party	Candidate	Votes	%
Conservative	T. Savage	851	72.0
Conservative	C. Webb	848	71.7
Labour	H. Sweetman	276	23.3
Labour	B. Else	250	21.1
Turnout		~1,184	46.0
Registered electors		2,573	
Conservative win (new seat)			
Conservative win (new seat)			

=== Felixstowe East ===
Felixstowe East (2 seats)
Party	Candidate	Votes	%
Conservative	R. Bojdys	Unopposed	
Conservative	B. Clarke	Unopposed	
Registered electors		2,886	
Conservative win (new seat)			
Conservative win (new seat)			

=== Felixstowe North ===
Felixstowe North (2 seats)
Party	Candidate	Votes	%
Conservative	C. Grayston	749	56.0
Labour	M. Deacon	670	50.1
Conservative	R. Palmer	667	49.8
Labour	M. Dyer	595	44.5
Turnout		~1,338	51.0
Registered electors		2,907	
Conservative win (new seat)			
Labour win (new seat)			

=== Felixstowe South ===
Felixstowe South (2 seats)
Party	Candidate	Votes	%
Conservative	V. Sutton	503	42.4
Independent	A. Loveday	502	42.4
Conservative	A. George	381	32.1
Independent	J. Ryles	366	30.9
Independent	D. Paddick	292	24.6
Turnout		~1,185	46.8
Registered electors		2,533	
Conservative win (new seat)			
Independent win (new seat)			

=== Felixstowe South East ===
Felixstowe South East (2 seats)
Party	Candidate	Votes	%
Conservative	N. Mumford	Unopposed	
Conservative	R. Tozer	Unopposed	
Registered electors		2,818	
Conservative win (new seat)			
Conservative win (new seat)			

=== Felixstowe West ===
Felixstowe West (2 seats)
Party	Candidate	Votes	%
Conservative	L. Careless	507	42.1
Conservative	M. Stokell	483	40.1
Independent	B. Gibson	410	34.1
Labour	M. Sharman	398	33.1
Labour	D. Ballentyne	389	32.3
Turnout		~1,204	46.4
Registered electors		2,592	
Conservative win (new seat)			
Conservative win (new seat)			

=== Framlingham ===
Framlingham
Party	Candidate	Votes	%
Conservative	T. Coe	489	54.0
Labour	J. Campbell	311	34.3
Alliance	K. Rooke	103	11.4
Majority		178	19.7
Turnout		906	51.4
Registered electors		1,762	
Conservative win (new seat)			

=== Glemham ===
Glemham
Party	Candidate	Votes	%
Conservative	H. Brookes	Unopposed	
Registered electors		891	
Conservative win (new seat)			

=== Grundisburgh & Witnesham ===
Grundisburgh & Witnesham
Party	Candidate	Votes	%
Conservative	J. Fabb	Unopposed	
Registered electors		1,627	
Conservative win (new seat)			

=== Hasketon ===
Hasketon
Party	Candidate	Votes	%
Conservative	P. Preese	Unopposed	
Registered electors		904	
Conservative win (new seat)			

=== Hollesley ===
Hollesley
Party	Candidate	Votes	%
Conservative	M. Shannon	Unopposed	
Registered electors		1,005	
Conservative win (new seat)			

=== Kelsale ===
Kelsale
Party	Candidate	Votes	%
Conservative	J. Keeble	Unopposed	
Registered electors		1,096	
Conservative win (new seat)			

=== Kesgrave ===
Kesgrave (3 seats)
Party	Candidate	Votes	%
Conservative	M. Elmer	914	67.8
Conservative	P. Cooper	878	65.1
Conservative	T. Casey	825	61.2
Labour	S. Robinson	357	26.5
Labour	B. Margerum	347	25.7
Turnout		~1,349	36.6
Registered electors		3,687	
Conservative win (new seat)			
Conservative win (new seat)			
Conservative win (new seat)			

=== Kirton ===
Kirton
Party	Candidate	Votes	%
Independent	J. Metcalfe	649	74.9
Labour	S. Voelcker	87	10.0
Majority		562	64.9
Turnout		742	50.9
Registered electors		1,458	
Independent win (new seat)			

=== Leiston ===
Leiston (3 seats)
Party	Candidate	Votes	%
Conservative	J. Geater	1,128	52.2
Labour	T. Hodgson	939	43.4
Conservative	T. Hawkins	902	41.7
Alliance	F. Huxley	844	39.0
Conservative	G. Hill	627	29.0
Communist	W. Howard	531	24.6
Alliance	D. Stanley	298	13.8
Turnout		~2,165	56.2
Registered electors		3,853	
Conservative win (new seat)			
Labour win (new seat)			
Conservative win (new seat)			

=== Martlesham ===
Martlesham
Party	Candidate	Votes	%
Conservative	C. Woods	Unopposed	
Registered electors		2,240	
Conservative win (new seat)			

=== Melton ===
Melton
Party	Candidate	Votes	%
Independent	M. Hutchison	545	73.6
Alliance	D. Fitch	194	26.2
Majority		351	47.4
Turnout		845	37.7
Registered electors		1,921	
Independent win (new seat)			

=== Nacton ===
Nacton
Party	Candidate	Votes	%
Conservative	J. Law	Unopposed	
Registered electors		1,640	
Conservative win (new seat)			

=== Orford ===
Orford
Party	Candidate	Votes	%
Conservative	E. Greenwell	Unopposed	
Registered electors		842	
Conservative win (new seat)			

=== Otley ===
Otley
Party	Candidate	Votes	%
Conservative	R. Kitson	302	65.2
Independent	D. Yule	161	34.8
Majority		141	30.5
Turnout		463	47.6
Registered electors		979	
Conservative win (new seat)			

=== Rushmere St. Andrew ===
Rushmere St. Andrew (2 seats)
Party	Candidate	Votes	%
Conservative	D. Gooch	Unopposed	
Conservative	G. Laing	Unopposed	
Registered electors		2,826	
Conservative win (new seat)			
Conservative win (new seat)			

=== Saxmundham ===
Saxmundham
Party	Candidate	Votes	%
Independent	B. Fisher	Unopposed	
Registered electors		1,320	
Independent win (new seat)			

=== Snape ===
Snape
Party	Candidate	Votes	%
Conservative	J. Lapsley	Unopposed	
Registered electors		1,044	
Conservative win (new seat)			

=== Trimleys ===
Trimleys (2 seats)
Party	Candidate	Votes	%
Conservative	B. Carrick-Spreat	771	45.6
Conservative	D. Donnelly	707	41.8
Labour	R. Howlett	530	31.3
Labour	M. Dixon	388	23.0
Alliance	D. Squirrell	351	20.8
Alliance	P. England	307	18.2
Turnout		~1,696	49.8
Registered electors		3,405	
Conservative win (new seat)			
Conservative win (new seat)			

=== Tunstall ===
Tunstall
Party	Candidate	Votes	%
Conservative	A. Paice	265	60.4
Alliance	M. Stanley	174	39.6
Majority		91	20.7
Turnout		439	47.6
Registered electors		939	
Conservative win (new seat)			

=== Ufford ===
Ufford
Party	Candidate	Votes	%
Conservative	H. Fooks	Unopposed	
Registered electors		1,198	
Conservative win (new seat)			

=== Walberswick ===
Walberswick
Party	Candidate	Votes	%
Conservative	G. James	Unopposed	
Registered electors		1,345	
Conservative win (new seat)			

=== Westleton ===
Westleton
Party	Candidate	Votes	%
Independent	B. Caines	Unopposed	
Registered electors		1,142	
Independent win (new seat)			

=== Wickham Market ===
Wickham Market
Party	Candidate	Votes	%
Independent	P. Mason	354	65.6
Alliance	C. Rooke	104	19.3
Labour	P. Thurlow	76	14.1
Majority		250	46.3
Turnout		540	36.5
Registered electors		1,480	
Independent win (new seat)			

=== Woodbridge Central ===
Woodbridge Central
Party	Candidate	Votes	%
Conservative	G. Thornhill	288	51.0
Independent	P. Dawnay	215	38.1
Labour	D. Wilkinson	55	9.7
Majority		73	12.9
Turnout		565	44.0
Registered electors		1,285	
Conservative win (new seat)			

=== Woodbridge Farlingaye ===
Woodbridge Farlingaye
Party	Candidate	Votes	%
Conservative	S. Hewitt	245	59.9
Alliance	T. Horton	163	39.9
Majority		82	20.0
Turnout		409	34.3
Registered electors		1,192	
Conservative win (new seat)			

=== Woodbridge Kyson ===
Woodbridge Kyson
Party	Candidate	Votes	%
Independent	D. Dunnett	159	41.0
Labour	K. Redmond	134	34.5
Alliance	J. Aldam	85	21.9
Majority		25	6.5
Turnout		388	42.7
Registered electors		908	
Independent win (new seat)			

=== Woodbridge Riverside ===
Woodbridge Riverside
Party	Candidate	Votes	%
Conservative	M. Rowland	Unopposed	
Registered electors		1,068	
Conservative win (new seat)			

=== Woodbridge Seckford ===
Woodbridge Seckford
Party	Candidate	Votes	%
Conservative	R. Geen	Unopposed	
Registered electors		3,141	
Conservative win (new seat)			

=== Yoxford ===
Yoxford
Party	Candidate	Votes	%
Conservative	A. Hazelwood	386	65.0
Labour	J. Poppleton	207	34.8
Majority		179	30.2
Turnout		594	57.3
Registered electors		1,037	
Conservative win (new seat)			

== By-elections ==
=== Felixstowe East ===
Felixstowe East by-election: 7 November 1985
Party	Candidate	Votes	%	±%
Conservative		733	49.7	
Alliance		635	43.1	
Labour		106	7.2	
Majority		98	6.6	
Turnout		1,474	49.5	
Registered electors		2,978		
Conservative hold		Swing		

=== Hasketon ===
Hasketon by-election: 7 November 1985
Party	Candidate	Votes	%	±%
Conservative		199	53.1	
Alliance		154	41.1	
Labour		22	5.9	
Majority		45	12.0	
Turnout		375	29.5	
Registered electors		1,271		
Conservative hold		Swing		

=== Kesgrave ===
Kesgrave by-election: 21 November 1985
Party	Candidate	Votes	%	±%
Conservative		447	54.4	
Alliance		216	26.3	
Labour		159	19.3	
Majority		231	28.1	
Turnout		822	23	
Registered electors		3,574		
Conservative hold		Swing		
