= Firefighters Against Cuts =

UK political party

Firefighters Against Cuts (Welsh: Diffoddwyr Tàn yn Erbyn Toriadau) was a political party formed in 2003 which fought a small number of seats in the 2003 United Kingdom local elections. It was registered on 20 March 2003.

Paul Woolstenholmes was the party leader and he stood with Steven Brinkley, campaigns officer, the for Felixstowe North Ward in Suffolk Coastal.

Gerard MacMillan stood for Busby Ward, East Renfrewshire.

Fergus Richardson, a union leader of the Fire Brigades Union during the UK firefighter dispute 2002–03 stood for South Ayrshire Council. John Maitland also stood for Annbank Mossblown St Quivox Ward for the same council.
