= 1995 Suffolk Coastal District Council election =

Local election in England

- 4 May 1995

All 55 seats to Suffolk Coastal District Council 28 seats needed for a majority

	First party	Second party
Party	Conservative	Labour
Seats won	18	17
Seat change	▼18	▲10
Popular vote	18,967	20,395
Percentage	34.3%	36.9%
Swing	▼13.9%	▲12.1%
	Third party	Fourth party
Party	Liberal Democrats	Independent
Seats won	15	5
Seat change	▲12	▼4
Popular vote	13,309	2,370
Percentage	24.1%	4.3%
Swing	▲7.6%	▼2.7%
- Winner of each seat at the 1995 Suffolk Coastal District Council election.
Control before election
Conservative
Control after election
No overall control

The 1995 Suffolk Coastal District Council election took place on 4 May 1995 to elect members of Suffolk Coastal District Council in Suffolk, England. This was on the same day as other local elections.

== Summary ==
=== Election result ===
1995 Suffolk Coastal District Council election
Party	Candidates	Seats	Gains	Losses	Net gain/loss	Seats %	Votes %	Votes	+/−
Conservative	47	18	1	20	▼18	32.7	34.3	18,967	–13.9
Labour	47	17	10	0	▲10	30.9	36.9	20,395	+12.1
Liberal Democrats	41	15	12	0	▲12	27.3	24.1	13,309	+7.6
Independent	10	5	1	4	▼4	9.1	4.3	2,370	–2.7
Green	3	0	0	0	Steady	0.0	0.4	202	–1.9

== Ward results ==
Incumbent councillors standing for re-election are marked with an asterisk (*). Changes in seats do not take into account by-elections or defections.

=== Aldeburgh ===
Aldeburgh (2 seats)
Party	Candidate	Votes	%	±%
Conservative	J. Richardson*	550	42.4	
Conservative	M. Steen	538	41.4	
Liberal Democrats	S. Matthews	494	38.1	
Liberal Democrats	P. Little	485	37.4	
Labour	K. Doran	187	14.4	
Labour	N. Finlayson	157	12.1	
Turnout		~1,298	53.6	
Registered electors		2,422		
Conservative hold				
Conservative hold				

=== Alderton & Sutton ===
Alderton & Sutton
Party	Candidate	Votes	%	±%
Liberal Democrats	C. Block	273	50.6	
Conservative	R. Peacock*	162	30.1	
Labour	P. Buck	104	19.3	
Majority		111	20.5	
Turnout		539	48.0	
Registered electors		1,123		
Liberal Democrats gain from Conservative		Swing		

=== Bealings ===
Bealings
Party	Candidate	Votes	%	±%
Conservative	I. Jowers*	376	52.6	
Independent	G. Rufford	339	47.4	
Majority		37	5.2	
Turnout		715	48.9	
Registered electors		1,471		
Conservative hold		Swing		

=== Bramfield & Cratfield ===
Bramfield & Cratfield
Party	Candidate	Votes	%	±%
Labour	G. Mair	364	50.8	
Conservative	R. Church*	297	41.5	
Independent	R. Thomas	55	7.7	
Majority		67	9.3	
Turnout		716	49.0	
Registered electors		1,465		
Labour gain from Conservative		Swing		

=== Buxlow ===
Buxlow
Party	Candidate	Votes	%	±%
Liberal Democrats	W. Moss*	304	37.9	
Conservative	P. Truman	275	34.3	
Labour	J. Troughton	223	27.8	
Majority		29	3.6	
Turnout		802	46.7	
Registered electors		1,721		
Liberal Democrats hold		Swing		

=== Dennington ===
Dennington
Party	Candidate	Votes	%	±%
Liberal Democrats	A. Moore-Moffatt	330	52.3	
Independent	R. Rous*	301	47.7	
Majority		29	4.6	
Turnout		631	46.1	
Registered electors		1,374		
Liberal Democrats gain from Independent		Swing		

=== Earl Soham ===
Earl Soham
Party	Candidate	Votes	%	±%
Conservative	B. Kerr	298	50.8	
Liberal Democrats	S. Stocker	289	49.2	
Majority		9	1.6	
Turnout		587	47.7	
Registered electors		1,238		
Conservative gain from Independent		Swing		

=== Felixstowe Central ===
Felixstowe Central (2 seats)
Party	Candidate	Votes	%	±%
Labour	C. Bignell	533	38.1	
Labour	D. Rowe	516	36.9	
Conservative	R. Holland*	480	34.3	
Conservative	C. Webb*	470	33.6	
Liberal Democrats	P. Dangerfield	350	25.0	
Liberal Democrats	G. Moody	284	20.3	
Turnout		~1,393	52.0	
Registered electors		2,677		
Labour gain from Conservative				
Labour gain from Conservative				

=== Felixstowe East ===
Felixstowe East (2 seats)
Party	Candidate	Votes	%	±%
Conservative	B. Clarke*	679	47.3	
Conservative	C. Slemmings	607	42.3	
Labour	S. Sweetman	398	27.7	
Labour	S. McDonald	381	26.5	
Liberal Democrats	M. Sheppard	358	24.9	
Liberal Democrats	P. Warren	352	24.5	
Turnout		~1,448	47.4	
Registered electors		3,054		
Conservative hold				
Conservative hold				

=== Felixstowe North ===
Felixstowe North (2 seats)
Party	Candidate	Votes	%	±%
Labour	M. Deacon*	922	55.0	
Labour	D. Carpenter	775	46.2	
Conservative	A. Malster	266	15.9	
Conservative	R. Stops	225	13.4	
Liberal Democrats	A. Cousins	197	11.8	
Liberal Democrats	R. Knights	134	8.0	
Turnout		~1,409	48.4	
Registered electors		2,909		
Labour hold				
Labour hold				

=== Felixstowe South ===
Felixstowe South (2 seats)
Party	Candidate	Votes	%	±%
Conservative	D. Savage*	486	37.6	
Conservative	J. Bailey	393	30.4	
Liberal Democrats	C. Macgregor	370	28.6	
Liberal Democrats	D. Rayner	351	27.1	
Labour	D. Gibson	294	22.7	
Labour	M. Sanderson	285	22.0	
Turnout		~1,146	43.9	
Registered electors		2,610		
Conservative hold				
Conservative hold				

=== Felixstowe South East ===
Felixstowe South East (2 seats)
Party	Candidate	Votes	%	±%
Conservative	M. Minns	704	46.8	
Conservative	A. Smith*	699	46.5	
Labour	R. Campbell	489	32.5	
Labour	R. Pettit	435	28.9	
Liberal Democrats	V. Moffat	311	20.7	
Liberal Democrats	A. Yates	221	14.7	
Turnout		~1,505	51.6	
Registered electors		2,916		
Conservative hold				
Conservative hold				

=== Felixstowe West ===
Felixstowe West (2 seats)
Party	Candidate	Votes	%	±%
Liberal Democrats	H. Dangerfield*	684	43.2	
Labour	J. Mullen	637	40.3	
Labour	M. Pettit	628	39.8	
Liberal Democrats	L. Reeves	526	33.2	
Conservative	E. Bishop	261	16.5	
Turnout		~1,577	37.7	
Registered electors		4,184		
Liberal Democrats hold				
Labour hold				

=== Framlingham ===
Framlingham
Party	Candidate	Votes	%	±%
Labour	J. Campbell*	620	66.7	
Conservative	A. Kirby	309	33.3	
Majority		311	33.4	
Turnout		929	43.2	
Registered electors		2,163		
Labour hold		Swing		

=== Glemham ===
Glemham
Party	Candidate	Votes	%	±%
Liberal Democrats	P. Howard	242	58.2	
Conservative	H. Brookes*	174	41.8	
Majority		68	16.4	
Turnout		416	43.4	
Registered electors		963		
Liberal Democrats gain from Conservative		Swing		

=== Grundisburgh & Witnesham ===
Grundisburgh & Witnesham
Party	Candidate	Votes	%	±%
Liberal Democrats	G. Bull	381	50.9	
Conservative	M. Morton*	367	49.1	
Majority		14	1.8	
Turnout		748	39.6	
Registered electors		1,886		
Liberal Democrats gain from Conservative		Swing		

=== Hasketon ===
Hasketon
Party	Candidate	Votes	%	±%
Liberal Democrats	R. Else	338	52.6	
Conservative	P. Preese*	305	47.4	
Majority		33	5.2	
Turnout		643	51.1	
Registered electors		1,271		
Liberal Democrats gain from Conservative		Swing		

=== Hollesley ===
Hollesley
Party	Candidate	Votes	%	±%
Liberal Democrats	V. Mason	197	37.5	
Conservative	R. Dawson	172	32.7	
Labour	C. Hemming	157	29.8	
Majority		25	4.8	
Turnout		526	44.5	
Registered electors		1,186		
Liberal Democrats gain from Conservative		Swing		

=== Kelsale ===
Kelsale
Party	Candidate	Votes	%	±%
Labour	N. Hetherington	251	60.3	
Conservative	B. Volstaker	165	39.7	
Majority		86	20.6	
Turnout		416	39.1	
Registered electors		1,083		
Labour gain from Independent		Swing		

=== Kesgrave ===
Kesgrave (3 seats)
Party	Candidate	Votes	%	±%
Labour	G. Proctor	868	38.5	
Labour	A. Pitcher	781	34.6	
Conservative	H. Ferguson*	767	34.0	
Labour	N. Fox	742	32.9	
Conservative	C. Dowsing*	668	29.6	
Conservative	P. Cooper*	634	28.1	
Liberal Democrats	R. Young	412	18.3	
Liberal Democrats	L. Devlin	330	14.6	
Liberal Democrats	M. Breeze	254	11.3	
Turnout		~1,982	34.3	
Registered electors		5,778		
Labour gain from Conservative				
Labour gain from Conservative				
Conservative hold				

=== Kirton ===
Kirton
Party	Candidate	Votes	%	±%
Independent	J. Metcalfe	Unopposed		
Registered electors		1,660		
Independent hold				

=== Leiston ===
Leiston (3 seats)
Party	Candidate	Votes	%	±%
Labour	J. Girling*	1,199	36.4	
Labour	T. Hodgson*	1,134	34.4	
Labour	M. Taylor	1,040	31.6	
Conservative	J. Geater*	734	22.3	
Conservative	T. Hawkins	676	20.5	
Conservative	C. Spink	466	14.1	
Turnout		~1,977	49.3	
Registered electors		4,011		
Labour hold				
Labour hold				
Labour gain from Conservative				

=== Martlesham ===
Martlesham
Party	Candidate	Votes	%	±%
Liberal Democrats	J. Kelso	797	46.1	
Conservative	D. Embery	499	28.9	
Labour	M. Irwin	360	20.8	
Green	J. Forbes	73	4.2	
Majority		298	17.2	
Turnout		1,729	46.5	
Registered electors		3,769		
Liberal Democrats gain from Conservative		Swing		

=== Melton ===
Melton
Party	Candidate	Votes	%	±%
Independent	M. Hutchison*	533	53.4	
Labour	C. Place	465	46.6	
Majority		68	6.8	
Turnout		998	39.5	
Registered electors		2,546		
Independent hold		Swing		

=== Nacton ===
Nacton
Party	Candidate	Votes	%	±%
Liberal Democrats	N. Cawthorn	482	54.3	
Conservative	J. Law*	405	45.7	
Majority		77	8.6	
Turnout		887	36.7	
Registered electors		2,442		
Liberal Democrats gain from Conservative		Swing		

=== Orford ===
Orford
Party	Candidate	Votes	%	±%
Liberal Democrats	T. Archbold*	254	45.8	
Conservative	S. Bacon	201	36.3	
Labour	S. Evans	99	17.9	
Majority		53	9.5	
Turnout		554	53.6	
Registered electors		1,035		
Liberal Democrats gain from Independent		Swing		

=== Otley ===
Otley
Party	Candidate	Votes	%	±%
Liberal Democrats	A. Barrett*	294	73.7	
Labour	T. Dockerill	105	26.3	
Majority		189	47.4	
Turnout		399	37.5	
Registered electors		1,081		
Liberal Democrats gain from Conservative		Swing		

=== Rushmere St. Andrew ===
Rushmere St. Andrew (2 seats)
Party	Candidate	Votes	%	±%
Conservative	G. Laing*	558	39.9	
Liberal Democrats	D. Cooper	553	39.6	
Conservative	D. Gooch*	548	39.2	
Liberal Democrats	G. Elliott	447	31.9	
Labour	M. Hyde	286	20.5	
Labour	V. Atkinson-Padmore	280	20.1	
Turnout		~1,421	42.1	
Registered electors		3,374		
Conservative hold				
Liberal Democrats gain from Conservative				

=== Saxmundham ===
Saxmundham
Party	Candidate	Votes	%	±%
Labour	K. Welton	477	52.6	
Conservative	R. Warren*	208	22.9	
Independent	P. Bush	153	16.9	
Independent	J. Fisher	69	7.6	
Majority		269	29.7	
Turnout		907	48.3	
Registered electors		1,884		
Labour gain from Conservative		Swing		

=== Snape ===
Snape
Party	Candidate	Votes	%	±%
Conservative	K. Burnett*	258	46.5	
Labour	P. Hetherington	180	32.4	
Liberal Democrats	C. Fry	117	21.1	
Majority		78	14.1	
Turnout		555	46.0	
Registered electors		1,207		
Conservative hold		Swing		

=== Trimleys ===
Trimleys (2 seats)
Party	Candidate	Votes	%	±%
Labour	M. Dixon	908	54.2	
Labour	H. Blackshaw	865	51.6	
Conservative	D. Donnelly*	500	29.9	
Conservative	B. Carrick-Spreat*	492	29.4	
Liberal Democrats	S. Thomson	267	15.9	
Liberal Democrats	T. Gilbert	192	11.5	
Turnout		~1,790	40.9	
Registered electors		4,377		
Labour gain from Conservative				
Labour gain from Conservative				

=== Tunstall ===
Tunstall
Party	Candidate	Votes	%	±%
Conservative	R. Herring*	383	50.9	
Labour	P. Wolfers	217	28.8	
Liberal Democrats	A. Llewellyn	121	16.1	
Green	P. Martin	32	4.2	
Majority		166	22.1	
Turnout		753	46.6	
Registered electors		1,626		
Conservative hold		Swing		

=== Ufford ===
Ufford
Party	Candidate	Votes	%	±%
Conservative	E. Cavendish	305	47.4	
Liberal Democrats	J. Monk	177	27.5	
Labour	H. Osborne	161	25.0	
Majority		128	19.9	
Turnout		643	49.9	
Registered electors		1,291		
Conservative hold		Swing		

=== Walberswick ===
Walberswick
Party	Candidate	Votes	%	±%
Conservative	R. Leighton*	389	53.7	
Labour	R. Winyard	336	46.3	
Majority		53	7.4	
Turnout		725	56.6	
Registered electors		1,315		
Conservative hold		Swing		

=== Westleton ===
Westleton
Party	Candidate	Votes	%	±%
Independent	B. Caines*	325	55.9	
Labour	E. Stringer	159	27.4	
Green	C. Barnett	97	16.7	
Majority		166	28.5	
Turnout		581	51.5	
Registered electors		1,136		
Independent hold		Swing		

=== Wickham Market ===
Wickham Market
Party	Candidate	Votes	%	±%
Independent	P. Mason*	346	49.9	
Labour	B. Dockerill	190	27.4	
Liberal Democrats	B. Hall	158	22.8	
Majority		156	22.5	
Turnout		694	39.1	
Registered electors		1,805		
Independent hold		Swing		

=== Woodbridge Central ===
Woodbridge Central
Party	Candidate	Votes	%	±%
Liberal Democrats	M. Wenyon	300	43.2	
Conservative	A. Hinton	236	34.0	
Labour	M. Caddick	159	22.9	
Majority		64	9.2	
Turnout		695	50.8	
Registered electors		1,394		
Liberal Democrats gain from Conservative		Swing		

=== Woodbridge Farlingaye ===
Woodbridge Farlingaye
Party	Candidate	Votes	%	±%
Liberal Democrats	A. Healey*	307	50.6	
Labour	A. Murray	207	34.1	
Conservative	J. Bidwell	93	15.3	
Majority		100	16.5	
Turnout		607	41.2	
Registered electors		1,490		
Liberal Democrats hold		Swing		

=== Woodbridge Kyson ===
Woodbridge Kyson
Party	Candidate	Votes	%	±%
Labour	R. Burgon*	306	77.3	
Conservative	J. Norris	90	22.7	
Majority		216	54.6	
Turnout		396	42.4	
Registered electors		939		
Labour hold		Swing		

=== Woodbridge Riverside ===
Woodbridge Riverside
Party	Candidate	Votes	%	±%
Conservative	S. Hewitt	363	63.1	
Labour	M. Arundel	212	36.9	
Majority		151	26.2	
Turnout		575	49.7	
Registered electors		1,170		
Conservative hold		Swing		

=== Woodbridge Seckford ===
Woodbridge Seckford
Party	Candidate	Votes	%	±%
Conservative	R. Geen*	236	39.8	
Liberal Democrats	D. Ball	226	38.1	
Labour	R. Davis	131	22.1	
Majority		10	1.7	
Turnout		593	51.1	
Registered electors		1,165		
Conservative hold		Swing		

=== Yoxford ===
Yoxford
Party	Candidate	Votes	%	±%
Independent	D. Gray*	249	43.6	
Labour	J. Stringer	172	30.1	
Liberal Democrats	P. Crosby	150	26.3	
Majority		77	13.5	
Turnout		571	49.3	
Registered electors		1,159		
Independent gain from Conservative		Swing		

== By-elections ==
=== Kelsale ===
Kelsale by-election: 19 October 1995
Party	Candidate	Votes	%	±%
Liberal Democrats		161	40.5	
Labour		124	31.2	
Conservative		113	28.4	
Majority		37	9.3	
Turnout		398	36.7	
Registered electors		1,084		
Liberal Democrats gain from Labour		Swing		

=== Bramfield & Cratfield ===
Bramfield & Cratfield by-election: 20 June 1996
Party	Candidate	Votes	%	±%
Conservative		330	49.9	
Labour		170	25.7	
Liberal Democrats		161	24.4	
Majority		160	24.2	
Turnout		661	45.1	
Registered electors		1,466		
Conservative gain from Labour		Swing		

=== Dennington ===
Dennington by-election: 21 November 1996
Party	Candidate	Votes	%	±%
Conservative		278	55.0	
Liberal Democrats		179	35.4	
Labour		48	9.5	
Majority		99	19.6	
Turnout		505	36.8	
Registered electors		1,372		
Conservative gain from Liberal Democrats		Swing		

=== Ufford ===
Ufford by-election: 19 April 1998
Party	Candidate	Votes	%	±%
Conservative		356	68.7	
Liberal Democrats		122	23.6	
Labour		40	7.7	
Majority		234	45.1	
Turnout		518	40.1	
Registered electors		1,292		
Conservative hold		Swing		
