= 2011 Suffolk Coastal District Council election =

2011 UK local government election

- 5 May 2011

All 55 seats to Suffolk Coastal District Council 28 seats needed for a majority

| | First party | Second party |
|---|---|---|
| Party | Conservative | Liberal Democrats |
| Seats won | 44 | 5 |
| Seat change | ▼1 | ▼4 |
| Popular vote | 42,104 | 10,786 |
| Percentage | 54.7% | 14.0% |
| Swing | ▼2.9% | ▼11.8% |
| | Third party | Fourth party |
| Party | Labour | Independent |
| Seats won | 4 | 2 |
| Seat change | ▲3 | ▲2 |
| Popular vote | 17,476 | 4,107 |
| Percentage | 22.7% | 5.3% |
| Swing | ▲11.5% | ▲3.5% |
- Winner of each seat at the 2011 Suffolk Coastal District Council election.
Control before election
Conservative
Control after election
Conservative

The 2011 Suffolk Coastal District Council election took place on 5 May 2011 to elect members of Suffolk Coastal District Council in Suffolk, England. This was on the same day as other local elections.

== Summary ==
=== Election result ===
2011 Suffolk Coastal District Council election
| Party | Candidates | Seats | Gains | Losses | Net gain/loss | Seats % | Votes % | Votes | +/− |
|---|---|---|---|---|---|---|---|---|---|
| Conservative | 55 | 44 | 1 | 2 | ▼1 | 80.0 | 54.7 | 42,104 | –2.9 |
| Liberal Democrats | 25 | 5 | 0 | 4 | ▼4 | 9.1 | 14.0 | 10,786 | –11.8 |
| Labour | 44 | 4 | 3 | 0 | ▲3 | 7.3 | 22.7 | 17,476 | +11.5 |
| Independent | 7 | 2 | 2 | 0 | ▲2 | 3.6 | 5.3 | 4,107 | +3.5 |
| Green | 8 | 0 | 0 | 0 | Steady | 0.0 | 3.3 | 2,524 | –0.2 |

== Ward results ==
Incumbent councillors standing for re-election are marked with an asterisk (*). Changes in seats do not take into account by-elections or defections.

=== Aldeburgh ===
Aldeburgh (2 seats)
| Party | Candidate | Votes | % | ±% |
|---|---|---|---|---|
| Conservative | Marianne Fellowes* | 833 | 53.1 | |
| Conservative | Terry-Jill Haworth | 766 | 48.8 | |
| Independent | Sarah Duerr | 575 | 36.6 | |
| Liberal Democrats | Stephen Day | 455 | 29.0 | |
| Turnout | | ~1,569 | 58.3 | |
| Registered electors | | 2,692 | | |
| Conservative hold | | | | |
| Conservative hold | | | | |

=== Earl Soham ===
Earl Soham
| Party | Candidate | Votes | % | ±% |
|---|---|---|---|---|
| Conservative | Robert Snell* | 738 | 75.2 | |
| Labour | Tony Dockerill | 243 | 24.8 | |
| Majority | | 495 | 50.4 | |
| Turnout | | 981 | 60.6 | |
| Registered electors | | 1,661 | | |
| Conservative hold | | Swing | | |

=== Farlingaye ===
Farlingaye
| Party | Candidate | Votes | % | ±% |
|---|---|---|---|---|
| Liberal Democrats | Diana Ball* | 316 | 40.9 | |
| Conservative | Patricia Mulcahy | 254 | 32.9 | |
| Labour | William White | 202 | 26.2 | |
| Majority | | 62 | 8.0 | |
| Turnout | | 772 | 49.5 | |
| Registered electors | | 1,561 | | |
| Liberal Democrats hold | | Swing | | |

=== Felixstowe East ===
Felixstowe East (2 seats)
| Party | Candidate | Votes | % | ±% |
|---|---|---|---|---|
| Conservative | Doreen Savage* | 1,151 | 57.5 | |
| Conservative | Christopher Slemmings* | 1,013 | 50.6 | |
| Independent | Gillian Mason | 570 | 28.5 | |
| Labour | Harriet Bennett | 373 | 18.6 | |
| Liberal Democrats | Bernard Price | 310 | 15.5 | |
| Labour | Heather Mullen | 260 | 13.0 | |
| Turnout | | ~2,001 | 60.3 | |
| Registered electors | | 3,319 | | |
| Conservative hold | | | | |
| Conservative hold | | | | |

=== Felixstowe North ===
Felixstowe North (2 seats)
| Party | Candidate | Votes | % | ±% |
|---|---|---|---|---|
| Labour | Michael Deacon* | 887 | 59.6 | |
| Labour | Kimberley Williams | 687 | 46.2 | |
| Conservative | Wayne Dye | 572 | 38.4 | |
| Conservative | Michael Titchener | 563 | 37.8 | |
| Turnout | | ~1,488 | 45.8 | |
| Registered electors | | 3,249 | | |
| Labour hold | | | | |
| Labour gain from Conservative | | | | |

=== Felixstowe South ===
Felixstowe South (2 seats)
| Party | Candidate | Votes | % | ±% |
|---|---|---|---|---|
| Conservative | Peter Coleman* | 694 | 47.8 | |
| Conservative | Joan Sennington* | 693 | 47.7 | |
| Labour | Richard Reaville | 375 | 25.8 | |
| Labour | Andrew Tink | 352 | 24.2 | |
| Liberal Democrats | Gerard Hughes | 316 | 21.8 | |
| Liberal Democrats | David Miller | 301 | 20.7 | |
| Turnout | | ~1,452 | 43.1 | |
| Registered electors | | 3,370 | | |
| Conservative hold | | | | |
| Conservative hold | | | | |

=== Felixstowe South East ===
Felixstowe South East (2 seats)
| Party | Candidate | Votes | % | ±% |
|---|---|---|---|---|
| Conservative | Janet Garfield* | 892 | 45.7 | |
| Conservative | Andrew Smith* | 849 | 43.5 | |
| Liberal Democrats | James Bennett | 639 | 32.8 | |
| Liberal Democrats | Cherrie MacGregor | 513 | 26.3 | |
| Labour | Ruth McGrath | 377 | 19.3 | |
| Labour | Peter Haymes | 343 | 17.6 | |
| Turnout | | ~1,950 | 54.9 | |
| Registered electors | | 3,552 | | |
| Conservative hold | | | | |
| Conservative hold | | | | |

=== Felixstowe West ===
Felixstowe West (3 seats)
| Party | Candidate | Votes | % | ±% |
|---|---|---|---|---|
| Conservative | Stuart Bird | 590 | 32.7 | |
| Labour | Michael Sharman | 590 | 32.7 | |
| Labour | Margaret Morris | 574 | 31.8 | |
| Liberal Democrats | Henry Dangerfield* | 547 | 30.3 | |
| Conservative | Stephen Beedle | 546 | 30.2 | |
| Labour | John Mullen | 535 | 29.6 | |
| Conservative | Jeremy Moore | 503 | 27.9 | |
| Liberal Democrats | Michael Ninnmey* | 479 | 26.5 | |
| Liberal Democrats | Peter Woods | 454 | 25.2 | |
| Turnout | | ~1,805 | 37.3 | |
| Registered electors | | 4,840 | | |
| Conservative gain from Liberal Democrats | | | | |
| Labour gain from Liberal Democrats | | | | |
| Labour gain from Liberal Democrats | | | | |

=== Framlingham ===
Framlingham (2 seats)
| Party | Candidate | Votes | % | ±% |
|---|---|---|---|---|
| Conservative | Christopher Hudson | 1,040 | 56.7 | |
| Conservative | Colin Walker* | 900 | 49.1 | |
| Labour | John Clough | 447 | 24.4 | |
| Green | Edward Thompson | 436 | 23.8 | |
| Labour | Edna Salmon | 355 | 19.4 | |
| Turnout | | ~1,833 | 51.8 | |
| Registered electors | | 3,538 | | |
| Conservative hold | | | | |
| Conservative hold | | | | |

=== Grundisburgh ===
Grundisburgh
| Party | Candidate | Votes | % | ±% |
|---|---|---|---|---|
| Conservative | Anthony Fryatt | 665 | 69.7 | |
| Labour | Eric Middleton | 289 | 30.3 | |
| Majority | | 376 | 39.4 | |
| Turnout | | 954 | 52.5 | |
| Registered electors | | 1,817 | | |
| Conservative hold | | Swing | | |

=== Hacheston ===
Hacheston
| Party | Candidate | Votes | % | ±% |
|---|---|---|---|---|
| Conservative | Graham Peck | 483 | 50.5 | |
| Labour | Lesley Bensley | 191 | 20.0 | |
| Liberal Democrats | Andrew Houseley | 166 | 17.3 | |
| Green | Rachel Fulcher | 117 | 12.2 | |
| Majority | | 292 | 30.5 | |
| Turnout | | 957 | 60.8 | |
| Registered electors | | 1,590 | | |
| Conservative hold | | Swing | | |

=== Hollesley With Eyke ===
Hollesley With Eyke
| Party | Candidate | Votes | % | ±% |
|---|---|---|---|---|
| Conservative | Jane Marson | 579 | 64.5 | |
| Labour | Janet Snell | 318 | 35.5 | |
| Majority | | 261 | 29.0 | |
| Turnout | | 897 | 55.0 | |
| Registered electors | | 1,664 | | |
| Conservative hold | | Swing | | |

=== Kesgrave East ===
Kesgrave East (3 seats)
| Party | Candidate | Votes | % | ±% |
|---|---|---|---|---|
| Conservative | Sally Ogden* | 1,405 | 51.8 | |
| Conservative | Mary Neale* | 1,390 | 51.3 | |
| Conservative | John Klaschka* | 1,343 | 49.6 | |
| Labour | David Isaacs | 704 | 26.0 | |
| Labour | Barbara Dockerill | 606 | 22.4 | |
| Liberal Democrats | Derrick Fairbrother | 561 | 20.7 | |
| Green | James Howard | 542 | 20.0 | |
| Liberal Democrats | Manooch Azmoodeh | 443 | 16.3 | |
| Turnout | | ~2,710 | 36.9 | |
| Registered electors | | 7,345 | | |
| Conservative hold | | | | |
| Conservative hold | | | | |
| Conservative hold | | | | |

=== Kesgrave West ===
Kesgrave West (2 seats)
| Party | Candidate | Votes | % | ±% |
|---|---|---|---|---|
| Conservative | Deborah McCallum* | 877 | 63.0 | |
| Conservative | Robert Grimwood* | 692 | 49.7 | |
| Labour | Anna Hubert-Chibnall | 427 | 30.7 | |
| Turnout | | ~1,391 | 45.4 | |
| Registered electors | | 3,063 | | |
| Conservative hold | | | | |
| Conservative hold | | | | |

=== Kyson ===
Kyson
| Party | Candidate | Votes | % | ±% |
|---|---|---|---|---|
| Conservative | Edward Binns* | 317 | 41.8 | |
| Liberal Democrats | Vanessa Gregory | 274 | 36.1 | |
| Labour | Roy Burgon | 168 | 22.1 | |
| Majority | | 43 | 5.7 | |
| Turnout | | 759 | 48.2 | |
| Registered electors | | 1,588 | | |
| Conservative hold | | Swing | | |

=== Leiston ===
Leiston (3 seats)
| Party | Candidate | Votes | % | ±% |
|---|---|---|---|---|
| Independent | Anthony Cooper | 841 | 41.4 | |
| Conservative | Andrew Nunn* | 805 | 39.7 | |
| Conservative | Trevor Hawkins* | 745 | 36.7 | |
| Labour | Terence Hodgson | 641 | 31.6 | |
| Conservative | Nigel Parker | 581 | 28.6 | |
| Labour | Brian Cox | 529 | 26.1 | |
| Labour | Steve Smedley | 422 | 20.8 | |
| Green | Anne Clark | 351 | 17.3 | |
| Liberal Democrats | Jacqueline Morrissey | 287 | 14.1 | |
| Turnout | | ~2,029 | 42.8 | |
| Registered electors | | 4,741 | | |
| Independent gain from Conservative | | | | |
| Conservative hold | | | | |
| Conservative hold | | | | |

=== Martlesham ===
Martlesham (2 seats)
| Party | Candidate | Votes | % | ±% |
|---|---|---|---|---|
| Liberal Democrats | John Kelso* | 1,110 | 51.2 | |
| Conservative | Christopher Blundell* | 960 | 44.3 | |
| Conservative | Paul Callaghan | 484 | 22.3 | |
| Independent | Leo Brome | 340 | 15.7 | |
| Labour | Adam Leeder | 264 | 12.2 | |
| Labour | Howard Needham | 225 | 10.4 | |
| Green | David Keeble | 193 | 8.9 | |
| Green | John Forbes | 181 | 8.3 | |
| Turnout | | ~2,168 | 54.1 | |
| Registered electors | | 4,008 | | |
| Liberal Democrats hold | | | | |
| Conservative hold | | | | |

=== Melton & Ufford ===
Melton & Ufford (2 seats)
| Party | Candidate | Votes | % | ±% |
|---|---|---|---|---|
| Conservative | Michael Bond* | 1,110 | 54.7 | |
| Conservative | James Bidwell* | 1,101 | 54.3 | |
| Labour | Jeremy Bale | 470 | 23.2 | |
| Labour | Cerys Shepherd | 452 | 22.3 | |
| Liberal Democrats | John Ball | 405 | 20.0 | |
| Turnout | | ~2,028 | 52.2 | |
| Registered electors | | 3,886 | | |
| Conservative hold | | | | |
| Conservative hold | | | | |

=== Nacton ===
Nacton (2 seats)
| Party | Candidate | Votes | % | ±% |
|---|---|---|---|---|
| Conservative | Veronica Falconer* | 1,113 | 59.1 | |
| Conservative | Patricia O'Brien* | 1,102 | 58.5 | |
| Labour | Andrew Leeder | 377 | 20.0 | |
| Green | Betsy Reid | 357 | 18.9 | |
| Labour | Peter Waller | 322 | 17.1 | |
| Turnout | | ~1,884 | 51.4 | |
| Registered electors | | 3,666 | | |
| Conservative hold | | | | |
| Conservative hold | | | | |

=== Orford & Tunstall ===
Orford & Tunstall
| Party | Candidate | Votes | % | ±% |
|---|---|---|---|---|
| Conservative | Raymond Herring* | Unopposed | | |
| Registered electors | | 1,437 | | |
| Conservative hold | | | | |

=== Otley ===
Otley
| Party | Candidate | Votes | % | ±% |
|---|---|---|---|---|
| Conservative | Peter Bellfield* | 777 | 76.3 | |
| Labour | Peter Stone | 241 | 23.7 | |
| Majority | | 536 | 52.6 | |
| Turnout | | 1,018 | 58.7 | |
| Registered electors | | 1,773 | | |
| Conservative hold | | Swing | | |

=== Peasenhall ===
Peasenhall
| Party | Candidate | Votes | % | ±% |
|---|---|---|---|---|
| Conservative | Stephen Burroughes* | 604 | 64.6 | |
| Labour | Roger Benstead | 331 | 35.4 | |
| Majority | | 273 | 29.2 | |
| Turnout | | 935 | 56.0 | |
| Registered electors | | 1,704 | | |
| Conservative hold | | Swing | | |

=== Rendlesham ===
Rendlesham
| Party | Candidate | Votes | % | ±% |
|---|---|---|---|---|
| Conservative | Terence Eastman | 659 | 67.2 | |
| Labour | Hugo Martineau-Needham | 321 | 32.8 | |
| Majority | | 338 | 34.4 | |
| Turnout | | 980 | 41.7 | |
| Registered electors | | 2,391 | | |
| Conservative hold | | Swing | | |

=== Riverside ===
Riverside
| Party | Candidate | Votes | % | ±% |
|---|---|---|---|---|
| Conservative | Geoffrey Holdcroft* | 538 | 54.0 | |
| Liberal Democrats | Kathleen Yule | 306 | 30.7 | |
| Labour | Andrew Corston | 152 | 15.3 | |
| Majority | | 232 | 23.3 | |
| Turnout | | 996 | 61.0 | |
| Registered electors | | 1,643 | | |
| Conservative hold | | Swing | | |

=== Rushmere St. Andrew ===
Rushmere St. Andrew (3 seats)
| Party | Candidate | Votes | % | ±% |
|---|---|---|---|---|
| Conservative | Robert Whiting* | 1,422 | 63.7 | |
| Conservative | John Withey | 1,405 | 62.9 | |
| Conservative | Mark Newton | 1,393 | 62.4 | |
| Labour | Stanley Robinson | 728 | 32.6 | |
| Turnout | | ~2,233 | 45.3 | |
| Registered electors | | 4,929 | | |
| Conservative hold | | | | |
| Conservative hold | | | | |
| Conservative hold | | | | |

=== Saxmundham ===
Saxmundham (2 seats)
| Party | Candidate | Votes | % | ±% |
|---|---|---|---|---|
| Conservative | Peter Batho* | 843 | 48.3 | |
| Liberal Democrats | Marian Andrews* | 596 | 34.1 | |
| Conservative | Richard Smith | 505 | 28.9 | |
| Independent | Donald Tricker | 425 | 24.3 | |
| Green | Joseph Cassels | 347 | 19.9 | |
| Liberal Democrats | Keith Dickerson | 335 | 19.2 | |
| Turnout | | ~1,746 | 45.8 | |
| Registered electors | | 3,813 | | |
| Conservative hold | | | | |
| Liberal Democrats hold | | | | |

=== Seckford ===
Seckford
| Party | Candidate | Votes | % | ±% |
|---|---|---|---|---|
| Conservative | Jason Sayles | 477 | 50.9 | |
| Liberal Democrats | Victor Harrup | 298 | 31.8 | |
| Labour | Susan Bale | 162 | 17.3 | |
| Majority | | 179 | 19.1 | |
| Turnout | | 937 | 60.4 | |
| Registered electors | | 1,567 | | |
| Conservative hold | | Swing | | |

=== Snape ===
Snape
| Party | Candidate | Votes | % | ±% |
|---|---|---|---|---|
| Conservative | Phillip Dunnett* | Unopposed | | |
| Registered electors | | 1,530 | | |
| Conservative hold | | | | |

=== Sutton ===
Sutton
| Party | Candidate | Votes | % | ±% |
|---|---|---|---|---|
| Liberal Democrats | Christine Block* | 502 | 53.1 | |
| Conservative | James Adeane | 319 | 33.7 | |
| Labour | Thomas Bolger | 125 | 13.2 | |
| Majority | | 183 | 19.3 | |
| Turnout | | 946 | 51.1 | |
| Registered electors | | 1,861 | | |
| Liberal Democrats hold | | Swing | | |

=== Trimleys with Kirton ===
Trimleys with Kirton (3 seats)
| Party | Candidate | Votes | % | ±% |
|---|---|---|---|---|
| Conservative | Susan Harvey | 1,053 | 42.1 | |
| Conservative | Graham Harding* | 981 | 39.3 | |
| Conservative | Richard Kerry* | 948 | 37.9 | |
| Independent | Sherrie Green* | 762 | 30.5 | |
| Labour | Steven Brinkley | 631 | 25.3 | |
| Labour | Justine Good | 568 | 22.7 | |
| Labour | Neville Mayes | 560 | 22.4 | |
| Liberal Democrats | Andrew Marfleet | 379 | 15.2 | |
| Liberal Democrats | Ian Burnett | 308 | 12.3 | |
| Turnout | | ~2,499 | 46.0 | |
| Registered electors | | 5,432 | | |
| Conservative hold | | | | |
| Conservative hold | | | | |
| Conservative hold | | | | |

=== Walberswick & Wenhaston ===
Walberswick & Wenhaston
| Party | Candidate | Votes | % | ±% |
|---|---|---|---|---|
| Conservative | Michael Gower | 595 | 65.1 | |
| Labour | Anne Thomas | 319 | 34.9 | |
| Majority | | 276 | 30.2 | |
| Turnout | | 914 | 60.3 | |
| Registered electors | | 1,538 | | |
| Conservative hold | | Swing | | |

=== Wickham Market ===
Wickham Market
| Party | Candidate | Votes | % | ±% |
|---|---|---|---|---|
| Liberal Democrats | Bryan Hall* | 486 | 60.5 | |
| Conservative | Diane Smith | 191 | 23.8 | |
| Labour | Valerie Pizzey | 126 | 15.7 | |
| Majority | | 295 | 36.7 | |
| Turnout | | 803 | 48.0 | |
| Registered electors | | 1,685 | | |
| Liberal Democrats hold | | Swing | | |

=== Witnesham ===
Witnesham
| Party | Candidate | Votes | % | ±% |
|---|---|---|---|---|
| Conservative | Steven Hudson | 659 | 76.1 | |
| Labour | Anthony Scott | 207 | 23.9 | |
| Majority | | 452 | 52.2 | |
| Turnout | | 866 | 54.4 | |
| Registered electors | | 1,602 | | |
| Conservative hold | | Swing | | |

=== Yoxford ===
Yoxford
| Party | Candidate | Votes | % | ±% |
|---|---|---|---|---|
| Independent | John Slater* | 594 | 60.6 | |
| Conservative | Helen Williams | 386 | 39.4 | |
| Majority | | 208 | 21.2 | |
| Turnout | | 980 | 61.9 | |
| Registered electors | | 1,597 | | |
| Independent gain from Liberal Democrats | | Swing | | |

== By-elections ==
Kesgrave East By-Election 9 February 2012
| Party | Candidate | Votes | % | ±% |
|---|---|---|---|---|
| Conservative | Geoff Lynch | 531 | 55.0 | +11.3 |
| Labour | David Isaacs | 241 | 24.9 | +3.0 |
| Liberal Democrats | Derrick Fairbrother | 194 | 20.1 | +2.6 |
| Majority | | 290 | 30.0 | |
| Turnout | | 966 | | |
| Conservative hold | | Swing | | |
