= 2007 Suffolk Coastal District Council election =

2007 UK local government election

- 3 May 2007

All 55 seats to Suffolk Coastal District Council 28 seats needed for a majority

	First party	Second party	Third party
Party	Conservative	Liberal Democrats	Labour
Seats won	45	9	1
Seat change	▲2	▼1	▼1
Popular vote	37,928	16,969	7,397
Percentage	57.6%	25.8%	11.2%
Swing	▲7.8%	▼6.2%	▼2.6%
- Winner of each seat at the 2007 Suffolk Coastal District Council election.
Control before election
Conservative
Control after election
Conservative

The 2007 Suffolk Coastal District Council election took place on 3 May 2007 to elect members of Suffolk Coastal District Council in Suffolk, England. This was on the same day as other local elections.

== Summary ==
=== Election result ===
2007 Suffolk Coastal District Council election
Party	Candidates	Seats	Gains	Losses	Net gain/loss	Seats %	Votes %	Votes	+/−
Conservative	55	45	3	1	▲2	81.8	57.6	37,928	+7.8
Liberal Democrats	39	9	1	2	▼1	16.4	25.8	16,969	–6.2
Labour	28	1	0	1	▼1	1.8	11.2	7,397	–2.6
Green	10	0	0	0	Steady	0.0	3.5	2,275	+0.4
Independent	3	0	0	0	Steady	0.0	1.8	1,153	+1.2
UKIP	1	0	0	0	Steady	0.0	0.1	70	N/A
BNP	1	0	0	0	Steady	0.0	0.1	55	N/A

== Ward results ==
Incumbent councillors standing for re-election are marked with an asterisk (*). Changes in seats do not take into account by-elections or defections.

=== Aldeburgh ===
Aldeburgh (2 seats)
Party	Candidate	Votes	%	±%
Conservative	Marianne Fellowes	960	64.2	
Conservative	Roger Warren*	783	52.4	
Liberal Democrats	Jill Hubbard	513	34.3	
Liberal Democrats	Nicola Pilkington	402	26.9	
Turnout		~1,495	52.4	
Registered electors		2,853		
Conservative hold				
Conservative hold				

=== Earl Soham ===
Earl Soham
Party	Candidate	Votes	%	±%
Conservative	Bob Snell	499	62.1	
Liberal Democrats	Ron Else	305	37.9	
Majority		194	24.1	
Turnout		804	49.4	
Registered electors		1,661		
Conservative hold		Swing		

=== Farlingaye ===
Farlingaye
Party	Candidate	Votes	%	±%
Liberal Democrats	Diana Ball*	331	53.5	
Conservative	Paul Callaghan*	234	37.8	
Labour	John White	54	8.7	
Majority		97	15.7	
Turnout		619	40.7	
Registered electors		1,532		
Liberal Democrats hold		Swing		

=== Felixstowe East ===
Felixstowe East (2 seats)
Party	Candidate	Votes	%	±%
Conservative	Doreen Savage*	1,170	71.5	
Conservative	Christopher Slemmings*	1,107	67.7	
Liberal Democrats	Bernard Price	323	19.7	
Labour	Hattie Bennett	255	15.6	
Labour	Margaret Ridout	183	11.2	
Turnout		~1,636	49.2	
Registered electors		3,325		
Conservative hold				
Conservative hold				

=== Felixstowe North ===
Felixstowe North (2 seats)
Party	Candidate	Votes	%	±%
Labour	Mike Deacon*	596	44.8	
Conservative	Angel Goodwin	591	44.4	
Conservative	Jan Garfield	558	41.9	
Labour	David Rowe	467	35.1	
Green	Jonathan Mulberg	202	15.2	
Turnout		~1,331	41.6	
Registered electors		3,200		
Labour hold				
Conservative hold				

=== Felixstowe South ===
Felixstowe South (2 seats)
Party	Candidate	Votes	%	±%
Conservative	Joan Sennington*	654	49.2	
Conservative	Peter Coleman	628	47.3	
Liberal Democrats	Pam Dangerfield	544	41.0	
Liberal Democrats	David Miller	497	37.4	
Labour	Jane Bignell	124	9.3	
Labour	Alan Dunn	115	8.7	
Turnout		~1,328	41.5	
Registered electors		3,200		
Conservative hold				
Conservative hold				

=== Felixstowe South East ===
Felixstowe South East (2 seats)
Party	Candidate	Votes	%	±%
Conservative	Andrew Smith*	971	62.3	
Conservative	Henryk Gorski	959	61.5	
Liberal Democrats	Andrew Yates	355	22.8	
Labour	Heather Mullen	296	19.0	
Labour	John Mullen	271	17.4	
Turnout		~1,559	43.7	
Registered electors		3,567		
Conservative hold				
Conservative hold				

=== Felixstowe West ===
Felixstowe West (3 seats)
Party	Candidate	Votes	%	±%
Liberal Democrats	Harry Dangerfield*	783	49.9	
Liberal Democrats	Sandra Bryant	761	48.5	
Liberal Democrats	Michael Ninnmey*	737	47.0	
Conservative	Stuart Bird	406	25.9	
Conservative	David Bentinck*	386	24.6	
Conservative	Vanessa Wedge	363	23.2	
Labour	Catherine Knight	346	22.1	
Labour	Dennis Carpenter	333	21.2	
Labour	Brendan Lambe	322	20.5	
Turnout		~1,568	32.5	
Registered electors		4,824		
Liberal Democrats hold				
Liberal Democrats hold				
Liberal Democrats hold				

=== Framlingham ===
Framlingham (2 seats)
Party	Candidate	Votes	%	±%
Conservative	Winter Rose*	891	64.1	
Conservative	Colin Walker	741	53.3	
Green	Eddie Thompson	395	28.4	
Labour	John Clough	295	21.2	
Labour	Edna Salmon	162	11.6	
Turnout		~1,391	39.9	
Registered electors		3,486		
Conservative hold				
Conservative hold				

=== Grundisburgh ===
Grundisburgh
Party	Candidate	Votes	%	±%
Conservative	Ivan Jowers*	518	64.6	
Liberal Democrats	Gez Hughes	204	25.4	
Labour	Peter Stone	80	10.0	
Majority		314	39.2	
Turnout		802	43.8	
Registered electors		1,839		
Conservative hold		Swing		

=== Hacheston ===
Hacheston
Party	Candidate	Votes	%	±%
Conservative	Colin Hart*	472	55.4	
Liberal Democrats	Andrew Houseley	266	31.2	
Green	Rachel Fulcher	114	13.4	
Majority		206	24.2	
Turnout		852	52.7	
Registered electors		1,636		
Conservative hold		Swing		

=== Hollesley With Eyke ===
Hollesley With Eyke
Party	Candidate	Votes	%	±%
Conservative	Rhona Sturrock*	443	69.1	
Independent	Tony Wooderson	198	30.9	
Majority		245	38.2	
Turnout		641	40.6	
Registered electors		1,626		
Conservative hold		Swing		

=== Kesgrave East ===
Kesgrave East (3 seats)
Party	Candidate	Votes	%	±%
Conservative	John Klaschka*	995	53.8	
Conservative	Sally Ogden	738	39.9	
Conservative	Mary Neale	629	34.0	
Liberal Democrats	John Briggs	461	24.9	
Labour	Nikki Goodchild	432	23.4	
Independent	Luke Payne	374	20.2	
Labour	Stephen Connelly	294	15.9	
Labour	Stan Robinson	201	10.9	
Turnout		~1,850	29.3	
Registered electors		6,314		
Conservative hold				
Conservative hold				
Conservative hold				

=== Kesgrave West ===
Kesgrave West (2 seats)
Party	Candidate	Votes	%	±%
Conservative	Debbie McCallum	626	60.0	
Conservative	Martin Grimwood*	567	54.3	
Liberal Democrats	Veronica Read*	423	40.5	
Liberal Democrats	Esther Smith	313	30.0	
Turnout		~1,044	34.8	
Registered electors		3,001		
Conservative gain from Liberal Democrats				
Conservative hold				

=== Kyson ===
Kyson
Party	Candidate	Votes	%	±%
Conservative	Les Binns*	Unopposed		
Registered electors		1,580		
Conservative hold				

=== Leiston ===
Leiston (3 seats)
Party	Candidate	Votes	%	±%
Conservative	John Geater*	768	43.3	
Conservative	Trevor Hawkins*	676	38.1	
Conservative	Andrew Nunn*	657	37.0	
Independent	Tony Cooper	581	32.7	
Liberal Democrats	Jacqui Morrissey	520	29.3	
Labour	Terry Hodgson	512	28.8	
Liberal Democrats	Raymond Andrews	409	23.0	
Green	David Riebold	331	18.6	
Turnout		~1,775	37.7	
Registered electors		4,707		
Conservative hold				
Conservative hold				
Conservative hold				

=== Martlesham ===
Martlesham (2 seats)
Party	Candidate	Votes	%	±%
Liberal Democrats	John Kelso*	867	48.4	
Conservative	Chris Blundell	828	46.2	
Liberal Democrats	Jan Dooley	579	32.3	
Conservative	Terence Eastman	558	31.1	
Green	John Forbes	274	15.3	
Green	David Keeble	224	12.5	
Turnout		~1,792	46.3	
Registered electors		3,870		
Liberal Democrats hold				
Conservative gain from Liberal Democrats				

=== Melton & Ufford ===
Melton & Ufford (2 seats)
Party	Candidate	Votes	%	±%
Conservative	Michael Bond	990	62.2	
Conservative	Jim Bidwell*	985	61.9	
Liberal Democrats	Deborah Dann	486	30.5	
Liberal Democrats	Victor Harrup	317	19.9	
Labour	Roy Burgon	231	14.5	
Turnout		~1,592	42.3	
Registered electors		3,763		
Conservative hold				
Conservative hold				

=== Nacton ===
Nacton (2 seats)
Party	Candidate	Votes	%	±%
Conservative	Veronica Falconer*	1,001	68.6	
Conservative	Patricia O'Brien*	966	66.2	
Liberal Democrats	John Ball	422	28.9	
Turnout		~1,459	39.8	
Registered electors		3,666		
Conservative hold				
Conservative hold				

=== Orford & Tunstall ===
Orford & Tunstall
Party	Candidate	Votes	%	±%
Conservative	Raymond Herring*	484	59.8	
Green	Richard Roberts	182	22.5	
Liberal Democrats	Hugh Pilkington	143	17.7	
Majority		302	37.3	
Turnout		809	56.0	
Registered electors		1,453		
Conservative hold		Swing		

=== Otley ===
Otley
Party	Candidate	Votes	%	±%
Conservative	Peter Bellfield*	561	68.0	
Green	Peter Ward	138	16.7	
Liberal Democrats	Muffy Booth	126	15.3	
Majority		423	51.3	
Turnout		825	46.9	
Registered electors		1,768		
Conservative hold		Swing		

=== Peasenhall ===
Peasenhall
Party	Candidate	Votes	%	±%
Conservative	Stephen Burroughes*	509	61.9	
Green	Marion Gaze	313	38.1	
Majority		196	23.8	
Turnout		822	48.9	
Registered electors		1,693		
Conservative hold		Swing		

=== Rendlesham ===
Rendlesham
Party	Candidate	Votes	%	±%
Conservative	Phillip Dunnett*	437	65.5	
Liberal Democrats	Barry Halliday	230	34.5	
Majority		207	31.0	
Turnout		667	34.4	
Registered electors		1,952		
Conservative hold		Swing		

=== Riverside ===
Riverside
Party	Candidate	Votes	%	±%
Conservative	Benjamin Redsell	467	54.5	
Liberal Democrats	Andrew Craig-Bennett	208	24.3	
Green	Anthony Taylor	102	11.9	
Labour	Howard Needham	80	9.3	
Majority		259	30.2	
Turnout		857	55.0	
Registered electors		1,569		
Conservative hold		Swing		

=== Rushmere St. Andrew ===
Rushmere St. Andrew (3 seats)
Party	Candidate	Votes	%	±%
Conservative	Dennis Gooch*	1,264	65.7	
Conservative	Gordon Laing*	1,237	64.3	
Conservative	Robert Whiting*	1,217	63.3	
Liberal Democrats	Phil Archer	533	27.7	
Liberal Democrats	Trevor Jolly	483	25.1	
Liberal Democrats	David Houseley	292	15.2	
Labour	Christopher Towndrow	260	13.5	
Turnout		~1,924	40.4	
Registered electors		4,762		
Conservative hold				
Conservative hold				
Conservative hold				

=== Saxmundham ===
Saxmundham (2 seats)
Party	Candidate	Votes	%	±%
Conservative	Peter Batho*	805	55.6	
Liberal Democrats	Marian Andrews*	692	47.8	
Conservative	Richard Smith	590	40.7	
Liberal Democrats	Keith Dickerson	523	36.1	
Turnout		~1,448	39.1	
Registered electors		3,704		
Conservative hold				
Liberal Democrats hold				

=== Seckford ===
Seckford
Party	Candidate	Votes	%	±%
Conservative	Cliff Cocker*	405	54.7	
Liberal Democrats	Martin Whitaker	336	45.3	
Majority		69	9.3	
Turnout		741	52.0	
Registered electors		1,437		
Conservative hold		Swing		

=== Snape ===
Snape
Party	Candidate	Votes	%	±%
Conservative	Cyril Fidler*	415	60.0	
Liberal Democrats	Winifred Moss	277	40.0	
Majority		138	19.9	
Turnout		692	44.4	
Registered electors		1,575		
Conservative hold		Swing		

=== Sutton ===
Sutton
Party	Candidate	Votes	%	±%
Liberal Democrats	Christine Block*	484	61.9	
Conservative	John Pratt	298	38.1	
Majority		186	23.8	
Turnout		782	48.5	
Registered electors		1,616		
Liberal Democrats hold		Swing		

=== Trimleys With Kirton ===
Trimleys With Kirton (3 seats)
Party	Candidate	Votes	%	±%
Conservative	Richard Kerry	1,116	55.5	
Conservative	Graham Harding	1,108	55.1	
Conservative	Sherrie Green*	1,082	53.8	
Liberal Democrats	Doreen Rayner	454	22.6	
Liberal Democrats	Timothy Macy	408	20.3	
Labour	Neville Mayes	395	19.7	
Labour	Peter Waller	372	18.5	
Labour	Margaret Morris	328	16.3	
Turnout		~2,010	37.3	
Registered electors		5,389		
Conservative hold				
Conservative gain from Labour				
Conservative hold				

=== Walberswick & Wenhaston ===
Walberswick & Wenhaston
Party	Candidate	Votes	%	±%
Conservative	Kevin Keable	574	72.1	
Labour	David Tytler	222	27.9	
Majority		352	44.2	
Turnout		796	51.7	
Registered electors		1,573		
Conservative hold		Swing		

=== Wickham Market ===
Wickham Market
Party	Candidate	Votes	%	±%
Liberal Democrats	Bryan Hall*	411	60.2	
Conservative	Diane Smith	150	22.0	
UKIP	John West	70	10.2	
Labour	Val Pizzey	52	7.6	
Majority		261	38.2	
Turnout		683	40.8	
Registered electors		1,683		
Liberal Democrats hold		Swing		

=== Witnesham ===
Witnesham
Party	Candidate	Votes	%	±%
Conservative	Kate Waddell	562	82.5	
Labour	Anthony Scott	119	17.5	
Majority		443	65.1	
Turnout		681	42.5	
Registered electors		1,620		
Conservative hold		Swing		

=== Yoxford ===
Yoxford
Party	Candidate	Votes	%	±%
Liberal Democrats	Barry Slater*	551	58.9	
Conservative	Rae Leighton*	329	35.2	
BNP	Paul Goodchild	55	5.9	
Majority		222	23.7	
Turnout		935	57.8	
Registered electors		1,624		
Liberal Democrats gain from Conservative		Swing		

== By-elections ==
Witnesham By-Election 31 July 2008
Party	Candidate	Votes	%	±%
Conservative	Stephen Hudson	316	53.7	−28.8
Liberal Democrats	Andrew Houseley	272	46.3	+46.3
Majority		44	7.4	
Turnout		588	36.2	
Conservative hold		Swing		

Woodbridge Riverside By-Election 18 September 2008
Party	Candidate	Votes	%	±%
Conservative	Geoffrey Holdcroft	313	46.0	−8.5
Liberal Democrats	Guy Jewers	254	37.4	+13.1
Green	Anthony Taylor	57	8.4	−3.5
Labour	Roy Burgon	56	8.2	−1.1
Majority		59	8.6	
Turnout		680	42.9	
Conservative hold		Swing		

Felixstowe South East By-Election 4 June 2009
Party	Candidate	Votes	%	±%
Conservative	Jan Garfield	856	49.2	−10.6
Liberal Democrats	Bernard Price	693	39.9	+18.0
Labour	Margaret Morris	190	10.9	−7.3
Majority		163	9.3	
Turnout		1,739		
Conservative hold		Swing		

Walberswick and Wenhaston By-Election 9 July 2009
Party	Candidate	Votes	%	±%
Conservative	Peter Austin	316	66.0	−6.1
Green	John Barrett	163	34.0	+34.0
Majority		153	32.0	
Turnout		479	30.5	
Conservative hold		Swing		
