= Waldringfield Pit =

Protected area in Suffolk, England

Coordinates: 52.055°N 1.295°E

- Site of Special Scientific Interest
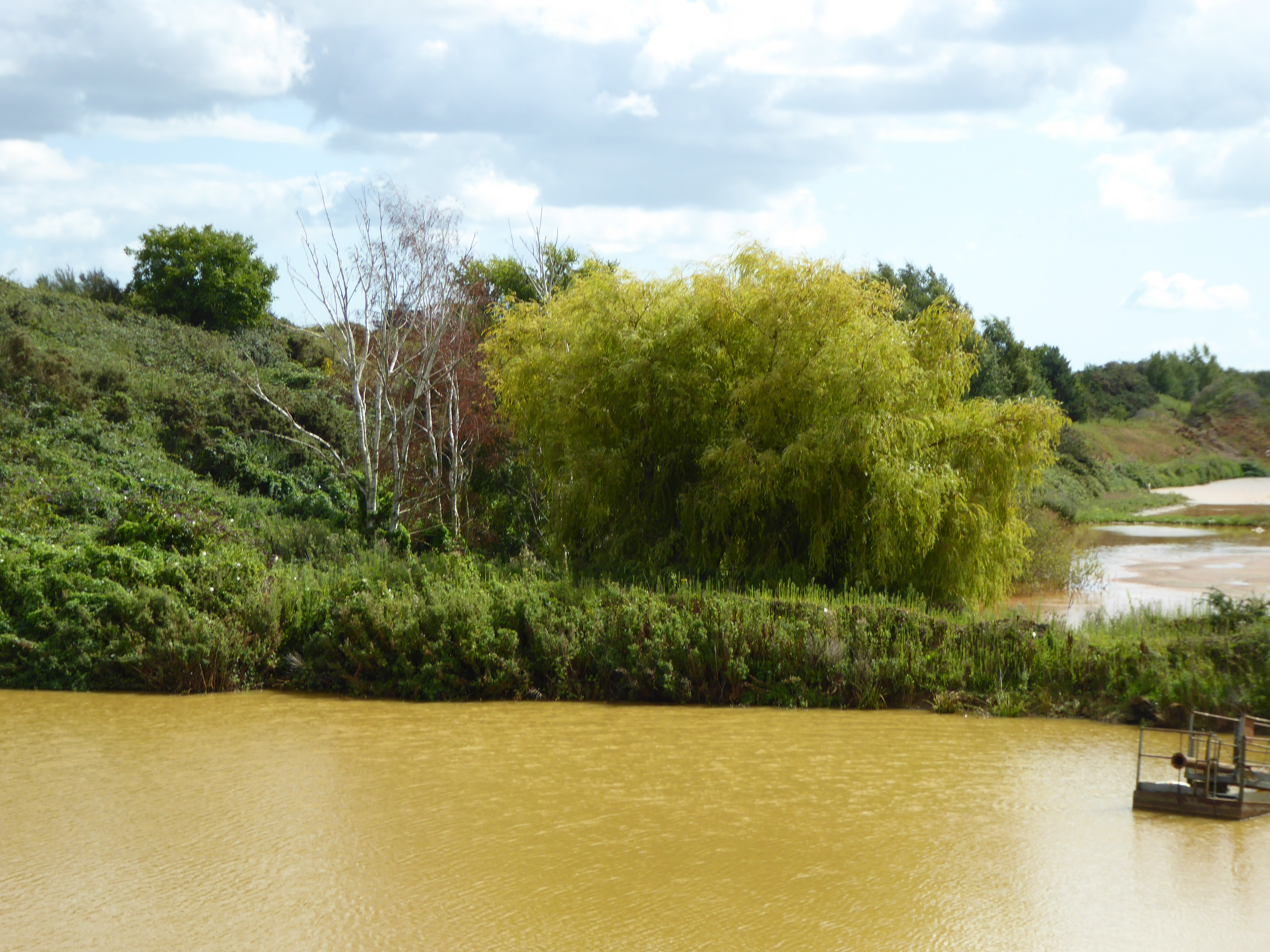
- View towards Waldringfield Pit
- Location of Waldringfield Pit.
- Area of search: Suffolk
- Grid reference: TM 260 448
- Interest: Geological
- Area: 0.8 hectares
- Notification date: 1991
- Location map: Magic Map

Waldringfield Pit is a 0.8-hectare (2.0-acre) geological Site of Special Scientific Interest between Martlesham Heath and Waldringfield in Suffolk. It is a Geological Conservation Review site.

This site exposes a sequence of Pleistocene deposits, with the early Red Crag overlain by Waldringfield Gravels, the lowest unit of the Kesgrave Sands and Gravels, which were deposits on the bed of the River Thames before it was diverted south by the Anglian Glaciation around 450,000 years ago. Waldringfield Pit is the type site for the Waldringfield Gravels.

The site is private land with no public access.
