= Suffolk Coastal =

Former non-metropolitan district in England

Coordinates: 52.0961°N 1.3227°E

Suffolk Coastal District
- Non-metropolitan district
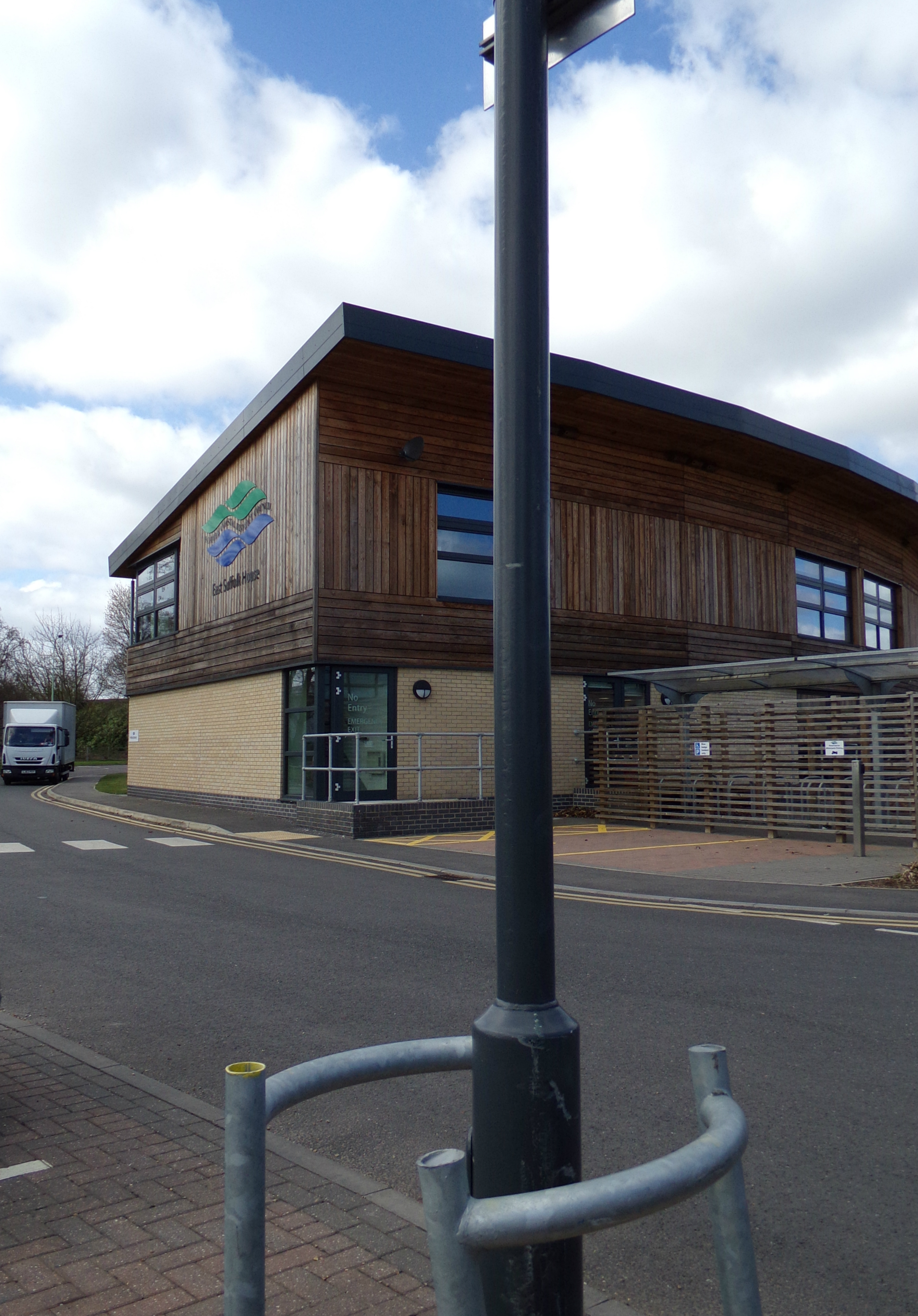
- Suffolk Coastal District Council Offices in Melton

- Suffolk Coastal shown within Suffolk and England
- Sovereign state: United Kingdom
- Constituent country: England
- Region: East of England
- Non-metropolitan county: Suffolk
- Status: Non-metropolitan district
- Admin HQ: Melton
- Incorporated: 1 April 1974

Government
  - Type: Non-metropolitan district council
  - Body: Suffolk Coastal District Council
  - Leadership: Leader & Cabinet ( )

Area
  - Total: 344.2 sq mi (891.5 km^{2})

Population (2017)
  - Total: 129,000
  - Density: 375/sq mi (145/km^{2})
  - Ethnicity: 98.1% White
- Time zone: UTC0 (GMT)
  - Summer (DST): UTC+1 (BST)
- ONS code: 42UG (ONS); E07000205 (GSS)
- OS grid reference: TM2756349450
- Website: www.suffolkcoastal.gov.uk

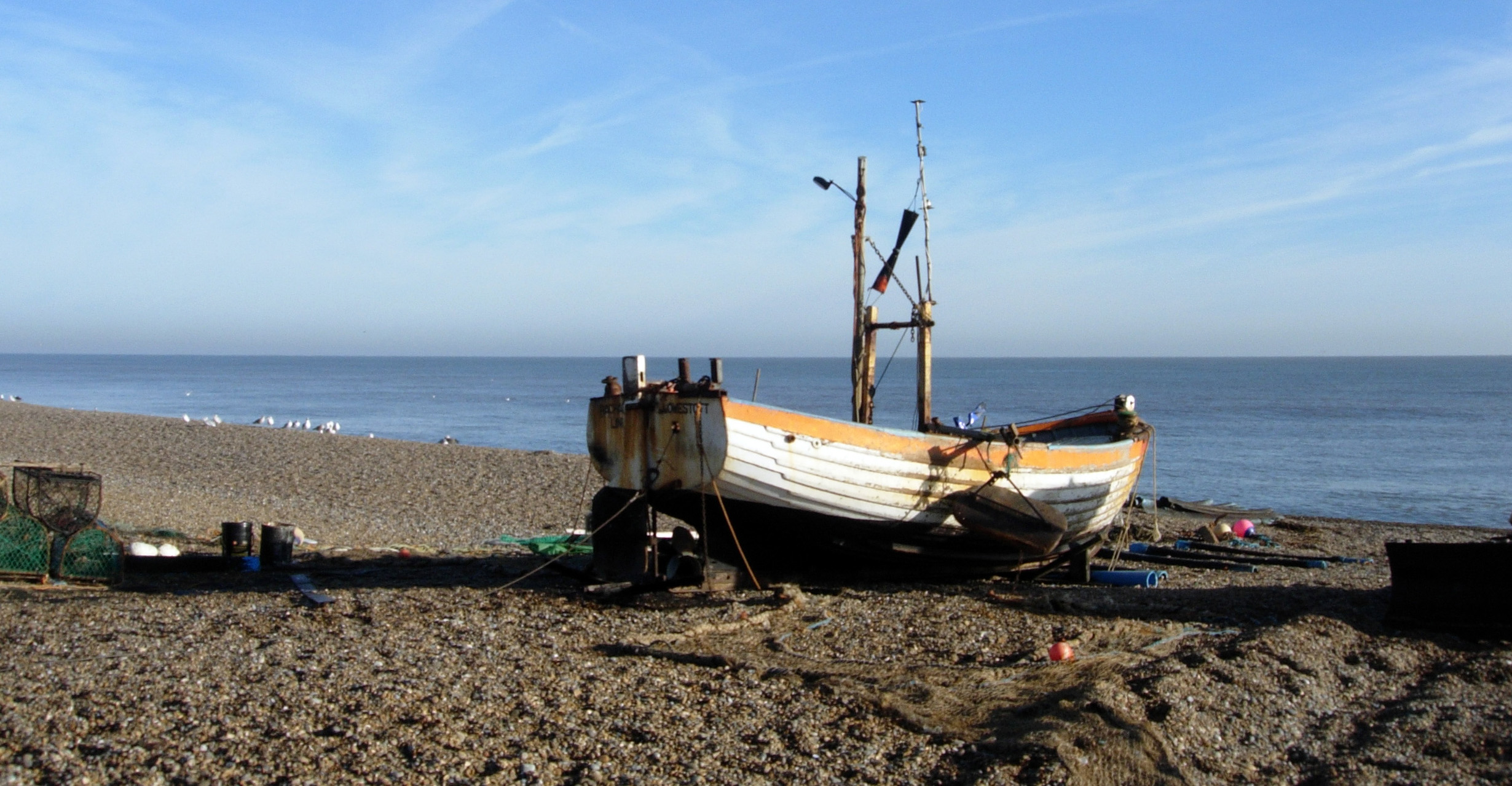
Coastline at Aldeburgh.

Suffolk Coastal was a local government district in Suffolk, England. Its council was based in Melton, having moved from neighbouring Woodbridge in 2017. Other towns include Felixstowe, Framlingham, Leiston, Aldeburgh, and Saxmundham.

The district was formed on 1 April 1974, under the Local Government Act 1972, as a merger of the municipal borough of Aldeburgh, along with Felixstowe, Leiston-cum-Sizewell, Saxmundham and Woodbridge urban districts, and Blyth Rural District and Deben Rural District. The population of the district was 124,298 at the 2011 Census.

Suffolk Coastal district was merged with Waveney district on 1 April 2019 to form the new East Suffolk district.

== Election results ==
There were new ward boundaries in 2003 and 2015.

| | Party | 2003 | 2007 | 2011 | 2015 |
|---|---|---|---|---|---|
| Con | Conservative | 43 | 45 | 44 | 37 |
| LD | Liberal Democrats | 10 | 9 | 5 | 2 |
| Lab | Labour Party | 2 | 1 | 4 | 1 |
| Ind | Independent | 0 | 0 | 2 | 2 |
| Greens | Green Party | 0 | 0 | 0 | 0 |
| UKIP | UK Independence Party | 0 | 0 | 0 | 0 |
| FAC | Firefighters Against Cuts | 0 | n/a | n/a | n/a |
| Result | Largest party | Con | Con | Con | Con |
| | Majority | 31 | 35 | 33 | 32 |
| | Total no. of seats | 55 | 55 | 55 | 42 |

== Wards represented ==
Below is a list of wards with the number of councillors they returned in the relevant periods. There were 118 civil parishes and towns distributed amongst these wards.

| Ward | No. of Cllrs. 2003-2015 | Communities 2003-2015 | No. of Cllrs. 2015-2019 | Communities 2015–2019 |
|---|---|---|---|---|
| Aldeburgh | 2 | Aldeburgh Ward: Aldeburgh Town; Buxlow Ward: Aldringham cum Thorpe, | 2 | |
| Deben | 0 | n/a | 1 | |
| Earl Soham | 1 | Earl Soham Ward: Brandeston; Earl Soham; Easton; Kettleburgh; Letheringham; Hasketon Ward:, Charsfield; Otley Ward: Cretingham, Hoo, Monewden | 0 | n/a |
| Farlingaye | 1 | Farlingaye ward: Farlingaye ward of Woodbridge Town; Woodbridge Central ward: Central ward of Woodbridge Town (part); Woodbridge Seckford Ward: Seckford ward of Woodbridge Town (part) | 0 | n/a |
| Felixstowe East | 2 | Felixstowe East Ward: East ward of Felixstowe Town (part); Felixstowe North Ward: North ward of Felixstowe Town (part); Felixstowe South East Ward: South East ward of Felixstowe Town (part) | 2 | |
| Felixstowe North | 2 | Felixstowe Central Ward: Central ward of Felixstowe Town (part); Felixstowe North Ward: North ward of Felixstowe Town (part); Felixstowe South East Ward: South East ward of Felixstowe Town (part) | 2 | |
| Felixstowe South | 2 | Felixstowe Central Ward: Central ward of Felixstowe Town (part); Felixstowe South Ward: South ward of Felixstowe Town (part); Felixstowe West ward:West ward of Felixstowe Town (part) | 2 | |
| Felixstowe South East | 2 | Felixstowe Central Ward: Central ward of Felixstowe Town (part); East ward of Felixstowe Town (part); Felixstowe South Ward:South ward of Felixstowe Town (part); Felixstowe South East Ward: South East ward of Felixstowe Town (part) | 0 | n/a |
| Felixstowe West | 3 | Felixstowe Central Ward: Central ward of Felixstowe Town (part); Felixstowe West Ward: West ward of Felixstowe Town (part) | 2 | |
| Framlingham | 2 | Framlingham Ward Framlingham Town; Dennington Ward: Dennington (part); Badingham; Earl Soham ward: Saxtead (part) | 2 | Framlingham |
| Fynn Valley | 0 | n/a | 1 | |
| Grundisburgh | 1 | Bealings Ward: Great Bealings (part); Little Bealings; Grundisburgh & Witnesham Ward: Culpho (part); Grundisburgh; | 1 | |
| Hacheston | 1 | Dennington Ward: Bruisyard; Cransford; Rendham; Swefling; Glemham Ward: Great Glemham; Hacheston; Little Glemham; Marlesford; Parham | 1 | |
| Hollesley with Eyke | 1 | Hollesley Ward: Boyton; Butley; Capel St Andrew; Hollesley; Wantisden; Tunstall Ward: Chillesford; Ufford Ward: Eyke | 0 | n/a |
| Kesgrave East | 3 | Kesgrave Ward: Kesgrave East; Martlesham Ward: Martlesham West | 2 | |
| Kesgrave West | 2 | Kesgrave Ward: Kesgrave West; | 2 | |
| Kirton | 0 | n/a | 1 | |
| Kyson | 1 | Woodbridge Kyson Ward: Woodbridge Seckford Ward | 0 | n/a |
| Leiston | 3 | Buxlow Ward: Knodishall; Leiston Ward: Leiston Town | 2 | |
| Martlesham | 2 | Martlesham Ward: Martlesham | 2 | |
| Melton | 0 | n/a | 2 | |
| Melton and Ufford | 2 | Melton Ward: Melton; Ufford Ward: Ufford; Pettistree | 0 | n/a |
| Nacton | 2 | Kirton Ward: Hemley; Newbourne; Waldringfield; Nacton Ward: Brightwell; Bucklesham; Foxhall; Levington; Nacton; Purdis Farm; Stratton Hall | 0 | n/a |
| Nacton and Purdis Farm | 0 | n/a | 1 | |
| Orford and Tunstall | 1 | Orford Ward: Gedgrave; Iken; Orford; and Sudbourne; Tunstall ward: Blaxhall; Tunstall | 0 | n/a |
| Orford and Eyke | 0 | n/a | 1 | |
| Otley | 1 | Hasketon Ward: Boulge; Bredfield; Burgh; Dallinghoo; Debach; Hasketon (part); Otley Ward: Clopton; Otley | 0 | n/a |
| Peasenhall | 1 | Bramfield an Cratfield Ward: Cookley (part); Cookley; Cratfield; Heveningham; Huntingfield; Linstead Magna; Linstead Parva; Walpole; Yoxford Ward: Peasenhall (part); Sibton | 0 | n/a |
| Peasenhall and Yoxford | 0 | n/a | 1 | |
| Rendlesham | 1 | Tunstall Ward: Campsey Ash; Rendlesham | 1 | |
| Riverside | 1 | Martlesham Ward: Martlesham North ward Woodbridge Central Ward: Central ward of Woodbridge Town; Woodbridge Riverside Ward: Riverside Ward of Woodbridge Town; Woodbridge Seckford Ward: Seckford ward of Woodbridge Town | 0 | n/a |
| Rushmere St Andrew | 3 | Rushmere Ward: Rushmere St Andrew | 0 | n/a |
| Saxmundham | 2 | Kelsale Ward: Kelsale cum Carlton; Theberton; Saxmundham Ward: Saxmundham Town | 2 | |
| Seckford | 1 | Woodbridge Seckford Ward: Seckford ward of Woodbridge Town (part); Woodbridge Central Ward: Central ward of Woodbridge Town (part); Woodbridge Riverside ward: Riverside ward of Woodbridge Town (part) | 0 | n/a |
| Snape | 1 | Buxlow Ward: Friston (part); Snape Ward: Benhall; Farnham; Snape; Sternfield; Stratford St Andrew | 0 | n/a |
| Sutton | 1 | Alderton & Sutton Ward : Alderton, Bawdsey, Ramsholt, Shottisham, Sutton; Sutton Heath (from 2012); Ufford Ward: Bromeswell | 0 | |
| Tower | 0 | n/a | 2 | |
| The Trimleys | 0 | n/a | 2 | |
| Trimleys with Kirton | 3 | Kirton Ward: Falkenham; Kirton; Trimleys Ward: Trimley St Martin; Trimley St Mary | 0 | n/a |
| Walberswick and Wenhaston | 1 | Bramfield & Cratfield Ward: Bramfield (part); Thorington; Walberswick Ward: Blythburgh; Walberswick; Wenhaston with Mells Hamlet | 0 | n/a |
| Wenhaston | 0 | n/a | 1 | |
| Wickham Market | 1 | Wickham Market | 1 | |
| Witnesham | 1 | Bealings Ward: Playford (part); Tuddenham St Martin; Westerfield; Grundisburgh & Witnesham Ward: Swilland (part); Witnesham | 0 | n/a |
| Woodbridge | 0 | n/a | 3 | |
| Yoxford | 1 | Westleton ward: Darsham; Dunwich; Middleton; Westleton; Yoxford Ward: Yoxford | 0 | n/a |
| Total | 55 | | 42 | |

== Arms ==
Coat of arms of Suffolk Coastal

Notes
Granted 10 December 1975.
Crest
On a wreath of the colours in front of a port between two square towers Proper issuant therefrom a rising sun of seven rays a mitre Or.
Escutcheon
Barry wavy of eight Azure and Argent a lymphad sail set Or flying flags and pennon of St. George on a chief Or three pellets that in the centre charged with a cross engrailed and the others each with an escallop of seven lobes Or.
Motto
New Views To Life.
Badge
A heptagon Azure fimriated Argent and charged with a lymphad as in the Arms.
