= Gedgrave =

Civil parish in Suffolk, England

Coordinates: 52.084°N 1.510°E

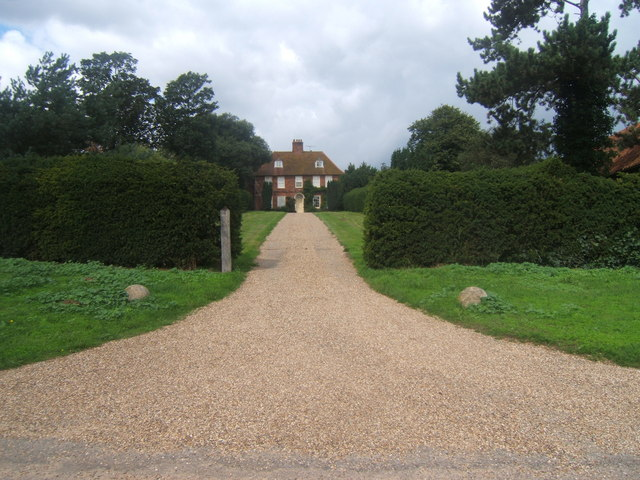
- Driveway leading to Gedgrave Hall

- Location within Suffolk
- Population: 30
- Civil parish: Gedgrave
- District: East Suffolk
- Shire county: Suffolk
- Region: East
- Country: England
- Sovereign state: United Kingdom
- Post town: Woodbridge
- Postcode district: IP12
- Police: Suffolk
- Fire: Suffolk
- Ambulance: East of England
- UK Parliament: Suffolk Coastal

Gedgrave is a civil parish in the East Suffolk district, in the English county of Suffolk in eastern England. In 2005, its population was 30. Gedgrave once had a church called St Andrews. The village is part of a joint parish council with Orford. From 1974 to 2019 it was in Suffolk Coastal district.

Gedgrave gives its name to the Gedgravian Stage of the Pliocene Epoch in British geological stratigraphy. The Sites of Special Scientific Interest Gedgrave Hall Pit and Richmond Farm Pit are situated close by.
