= Hemley =

Village and civil parish in Suffolk, United Kingdom

Coordinates: 52.0323°N 1.3300°E

- All Saints' Church

- Location within Suffolk
- Population: 66 (2001 census)
- Civil parish: Hemley
- District: East Suffolk
- Shire county: Suffolk
- Region: East
- Country: England
- Sovereign state: United Kingdom
- Post town: WOODBRIDGE
- Postcode district: IP12
- Dialling code: 01473
- Police: Suffolk
- Fire: Suffolk
- Ambulance: East of England

Hemley is a village and a civil parish in the East Suffolk district of Suffolk, England.

It is located near the River Deben. Nearby settlements include the large town of Ipswich and the villages of Waldringfield and Newbourne. In 2001 the population of the civil parish of Hemley was 66. At the 2011 Census the population of the village remained less than 100 and was included in the civil parish of Newbourne. From 1974 to 2019 it was in Suffolk Coastal district.

All Saints' parish church dates from the 14th century and is a Grade II* listed building.
