= Great Blakenham Pit =

Protected area in Suffolk, England

Coordinates: 52.107°N 1.087°E

- Site of Special Scientific Interest
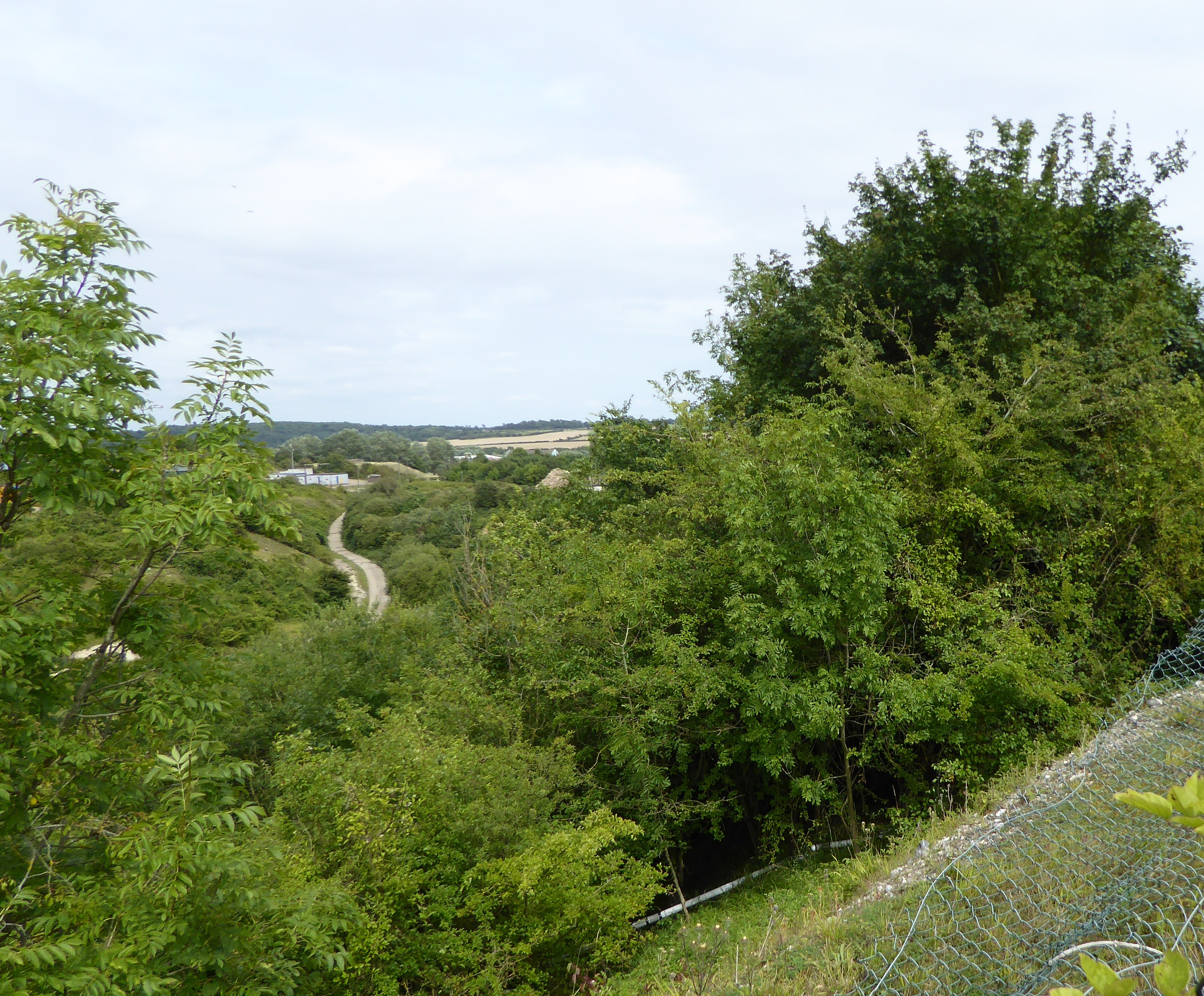
- Location of Great Blakenham Pit.
- Area of search: Suffolk
- Grid reference: TM 115 499
- Interest: Geological
- Area: 2.2 hectares
- Notification date: 1992
- Location map: Magic Map

Great Blakenham Pit is a 2.2-hectare (5.4-acre) geological Site of Special Scientific Interest south of Great Blakenham in Suffolk. It is a Geological Conservation Review site.

This is described by Natural England as a key site for Pleistocene studies. It has a sequence of early and middle Pleistocene deposits, including from the ancient course of the River Thames through East Anglia and from the severe Anglian ice age.

The site is private property with no public access.
