= Sandy Lane Pit, Barham =

Geological Site of Special Scientific Interest in Suffolk, UK

Coordinates: 52.121°N 1.117°E

- Site of Special Scientific Interest
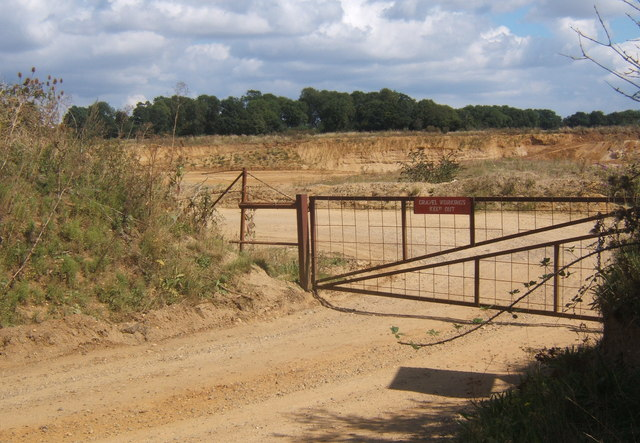
- Location of Sandy Lane Pit, Barham.
- Area of search: Suffolk
- Grid reference: TM 135 515
- Interest: Geological
- Area: 11.1 hectares
- Notification date: 1983
- Location map: Magic Map

Sandy Lane Pit, Barham is an 11.1-hectare (27-acre) geological Site of Special Scientific Interest west of Barham in Suffolk, England. It is a Geological Conservation Review site.

This site has deposits which span the period from the Beestonian Stage, which ended around 866,000 years ago, through the warm Cromerian Stage to the severe ice age of the Anglian Stage, which started around 478,000 years ago. It has Beestonian deposits thought to have been laid down by the proto-Thames, and a paleosol, a former land surface dating to the Anglian.

The site is private land with no public access.
