= Gedgrave Hall Pit =

Geological Site of Special Scientific Interest

Coordinates: 52.083°N 1.509°E

- Site of Special Scientific Interest
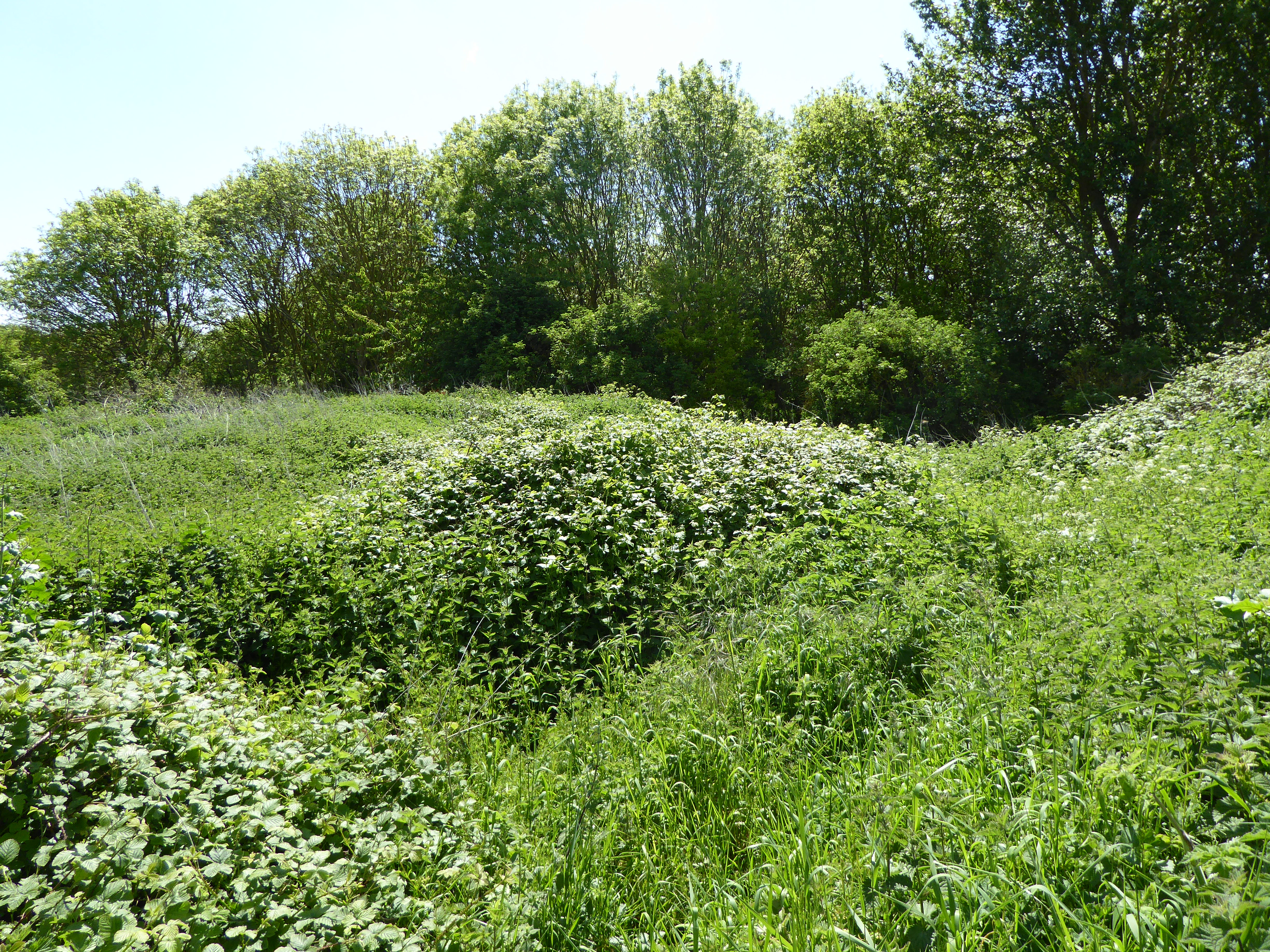
- Location of Gedgrave Hall Pit.
- Area of search: Suffolk
- Grid reference: TM 405 485
- Interest: Geological
- Area: 0.65 hectares
- Notification date: 1985
- Location map: Magic Map

Gedgrave Hall Pit is a 0.65-hectare (1.6-acre) geological Site of Special Scientific Interest in Gedgrave, south of Saxmundham in Suffolk. It is a Geological Conservation Review site, and it is in the Suffolk Coast and Heaths Area of Outstanding Natural Beauty.

The site consists to two pits dating to the early Pliocene Coralline Crag Formation. The smaller pit has many well-preserved mollusc fossils, whereas those in the larger pit are highly abraded and poorly preserved.

It is situated some 500 metres from the similar site: Richmond Farm Pit. The site is on private land with no public access.
