= Sutton, Suffolk =

Village in Suffolk, England

Coordinates: 52.067818°N 1.36299°E

Sutton
- All Saints Church

- Location within Suffolk
- Population: 1,804 (2011)
- OS grid reference: TM305455
- Civil parish: Sutton
- District: East Suffolk
- Shire county: Suffolk
- Region: East
- Country: England
- Sovereign state: United Kingdom
- Post town: Woodbridge
- Postcode district: IP12
- Dialling code: 01394
- Police: Suffolk
- Fire: Suffolk
- Ambulance: East of England
- UK Parliament: Suffolk Coastal

Sutton is a village and civil parish on the B1083 road, in the East Suffolk district, in the county of Suffolk, England. Sutton has a pub, a mobile post office and a place of worship. There is also the hamlet of Sutton Street and the Sutton Common estate nearby.

== History ==
Sutton in Old English means "Southern Farm"; sut meaning "south" and ton meaning "farmstead" or "settlement." John Marius Wilson described Sutton in the Imperial Gazetteer of England and Wales (1868) as

... a parish, with a village, in Woodbridge district, Suffolk; on the river Deben, 3 miles SE of Woodbridge r. station. It has a post-office under Wood-bridge. Acres, 6,410; of which 430 are water.

The Domesday Book is the oldest public record of the village; the book features information on Sutton as early as 1086. In that year there were 77 families living in Sutton and the Lord of Sutton was Robert Malet. From 1974 to 2019 it was in Suffolk Coastal district.

=== Employment ===
According to the 1831 Enumeration, there were 680 people living in Sutton. One hundred of the 126 families in Sutton at the time were said to be "... chiefly employed in Agriculture. All parishes within the hundred of Wilford, including Sutton, according to this information had families working primarily in agriculture. Arthur Young toured Suffolk in 1784 and wrote three accounts of farmers he was introduced to in Sutton of which: "Mr. William Waller, of Sutton, one of the greatest farmers in the neighbourhood, has 2700 acres, ploughs 1000, and has above 1000 sheep." Other statistics taken from the 1831 Census were Social status. These statistics state that over three-quarters of the people living in Sutton were labourers and servants. Meanwhile, only a very small fraction of the population made up the middling sorts, that is owners of small farms. These statistics are based upon the contemporary ideas of social status not as people would judge them today.

=== Churches ===
==== All Saints' Church ====
All Saints' Church was built in 1555 and was largely reconstructed by the Victorians. This medieval church has a font that dates back before the Reformation, which is strange, as the Church now belongs to the Church of England. The font is the only remnants of a pre-Reformation church, as it burnt down in the 17th century. Notable people buried in the churchyard include:

- Edith Pretty (1883–1942), the landowner on whose land the Sutton Hoo burials were discovered.
- Brian Forster Morton Franks DSO MC TD (1910–1982), a former lieutenant colonel in the Special Air Service and an agent of Secret Intelligence Service. He was educated at Eton College and fought in World War II. He was awarded the MC in 1943, before gaining the rank of lieutenant colonel in the service of the Middlesex Yeomanry and receiving the DSO in 1944. He was further decorated with the Legion of Honour and the Croix de Guerre. He gained the rank of honorary colonel in the service of the 21st SAS Regiment.

==== Baptist Chapel ====
There is also a small Baptist church, called the Chapel, located on Main Road, which was founded in 1813.

=== War memorial ===
In 1954 a Memorial Hall was built to commemorate all the soldiers from Sutton who fought in the Second World War. The hall was built by local people; both men and women participated in plastering the walls, donating electric heaters and buying curtains. The opening ceremony was held on 30 October 1958.

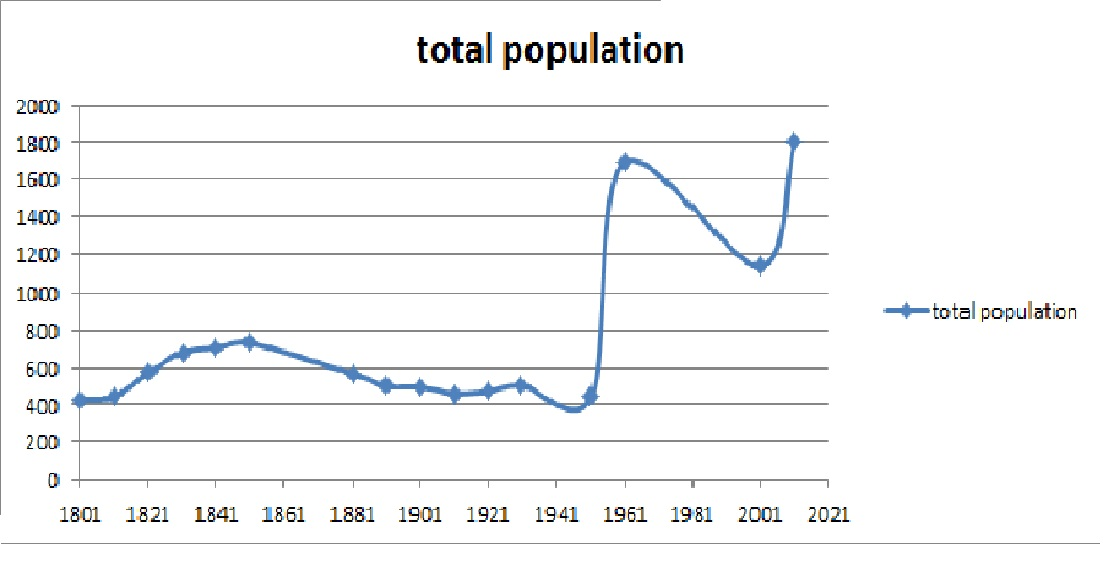
The total population in Sutton (Suffolk) from 1801 to 2011.

== Governance ==
An electoral ward in the same name exists. This ward includes Bromeswell and had a total population of 3,014 at the 2011 Census.

== Present day ==
Sutton is situated between the River Deben and Rendlesham Forest with the famous Sutton Hoo estate to the north of Sutton which is the site of an Anglo-Saxon ship burial. According to the 2011 census the parish has a population of 1,804. The most common occupations in Sutton, according to the 2011 census, are associate professionals and technical occupations especially in the protective services.

Within Sutton there is a town hall known as Memorial Hall, a pub called the Plough Inn, the All Saints Church and a smaller Baptist church known as the Chapel. Nearby there are tourist attractions such as the Sutton Hoo burial site, Rendlesham Forest and the River Deben.

=== Memorial Hall ===
The Memorial Hall is used to host community clubs. Clubs include a ladies' group that meet every second Thursday of each month and a computer group. The hall is also used for Pilates and dance classes. The recreation ground behind the hall is used by Sutton Heath Football club for their Under-14 and Under-12 teams as their original ground at Hollesley is too small to accommodate all the teams since the club has expanded. There is also a local bowls club that play on the green on the recreation ground. The bowls club have received a lottery grant to refurbish their hut for their closing tournament in September 2014.

=== Rendlesham Forest ===
The forest is owned by the Forestry Commission who have created many different walking and cycling trails, events and play areas throughout the forest. The forest is 1500 hectares large and in 1980 was the site of a UFO sighting (Rendlesham Forest incident).

In 2012 a new parish boundary was created. Residents sent a petition to the Suffolk Coast District council for a new parish in the north-east of Sutton. The new parish is called Sutton Heath and was created because it is more urban than its surrounding area in Sutton and therefore has different needs.

== Sutton Hoo ==
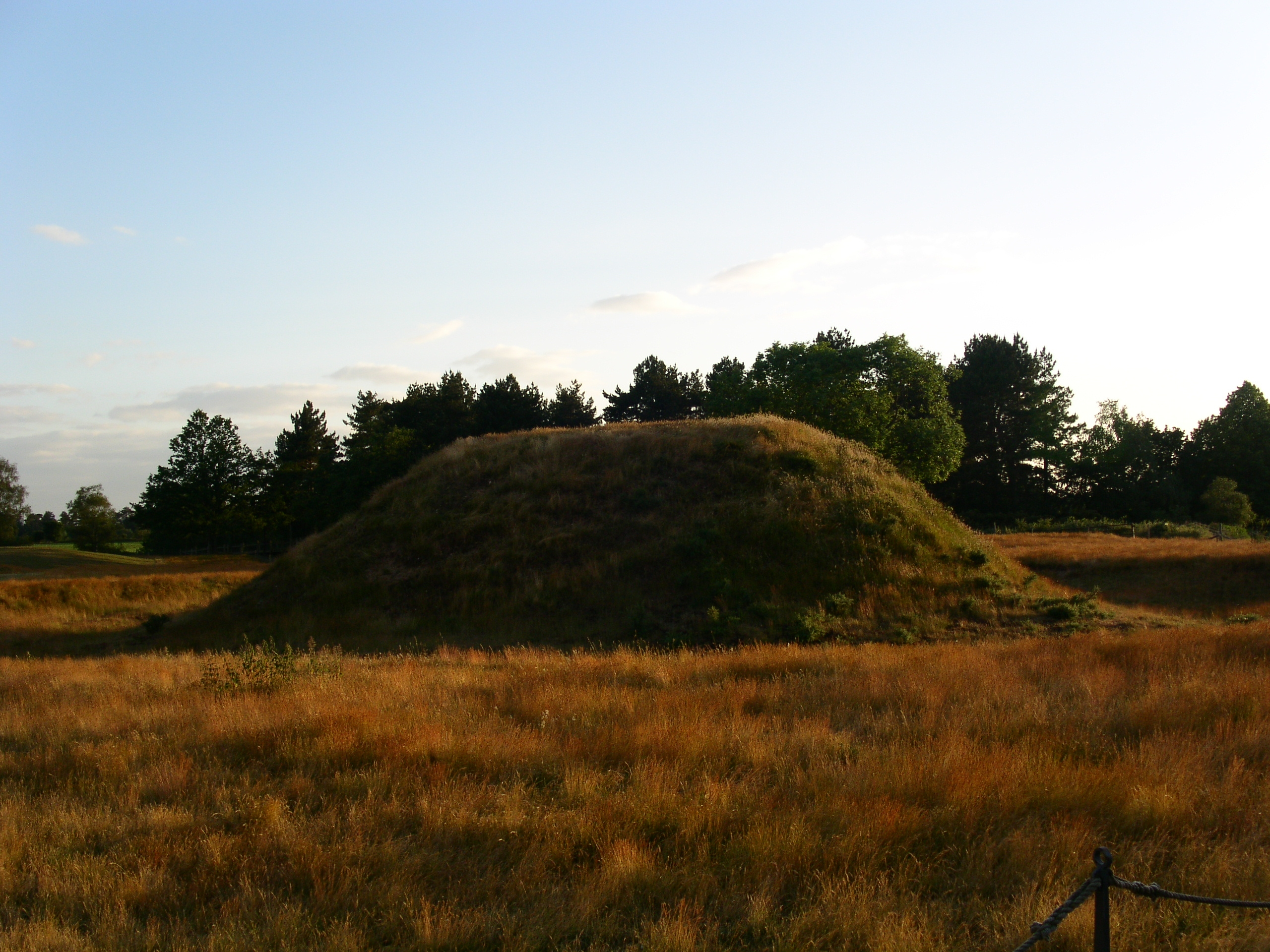
Sutton Hoo Burial Mound

The Sutton Hoo Estate is 225 acres and contains the burial site of an Anglo-Saxon ship. Archaeologist Basil Brown, working for the property owner discovered the Anglo-Saxon Burial at Sutton Hoo in 1940. The site is believed to be the final resting place of the king of East Anglia, Rædwald. Most of the artefacts excavated now reside in the British Museum. The burial site is now owned by the National Trust and is a major tourist attraction with facilities such as a café, parking and a gift shop.

== Sutton Hall ==
Sutton Hall is a Georgian country house with surrounding estates to the south of the village, formerly the home of Sir Guy Quilter. It was sold in 2018 for over £31.5 million.

== Bentwaters ==
RAF Bentwaters is an inactive military base located in Rendlesham Forest. The site is privately owned by a family business called Bentwaters Parks. Bentwaters Parks hires the site out to television and film making companies who wish to make use of the military style buildings located at RAF Bentwaters. The military base was the last to be built before the end of the Second World War. The area was chosen because of its flat terrain and because it was sparsely populated, and thus suitable for building the runways the base required. The base had a large impact on the population of Sutton: from its opening in 1941, men came to work on the base, and the population of Sutton increased drastically as shown in a population graph.
