= 2015 Suffolk Coastal District Council election =

2015 English local government election

- 7 May 2015

All 42 seats to Suffolk Coastal District Council 22 seats needed for a majority

	First party	Second party
Party	Conservative	Liberal Democrats
Seats won	37	2
Seat change	▼7	▼3
Popular vote	60,661	10,503
Percentage	55.2%	9.6%
Swing	▲0.5%	▼4.4%
	Third party	Fourth party
Party	Independent	Labour
Seats won	2	1
Seat change	Steady	▼3
Popular vote	3,672	24,174
Percentage	3.3%	22.0%
Swing	▼2.0%	▼0.7%
- Winner of each seat at the 2015 Suffolk Coastal District Council election.
Control before election
Conservative
Control after election
Conservative

The 2015 Suffolk Coastal District Council election took place on 7 May 2015 to elect members of Suffolk Coastal District Council in Suffolk, England. This was on the same day as the 2015 general election and other local elections.

The whole council was up for election on new ward boundaries, decreasing the number of seats by 13 to 42.

This was the final election to Suffolk Coastal District Council before it was abolished and merged with Waveney to form East Suffolk District Council. The inaugural election to the new authority was held on 2 May 2019.

== Summary ==
=== Election result ===
2015 Suffolk Coastal District Council election
Party	Candidates	Seats	Gains	Losses	Net gain/loss	Seats %	Votes %	Votes	+/−
Conservative	42	37	N/A	N/A	▼7	88.1	55.2	60,661	+0.5
Liberal Democrats	21	2	N/A	N/A	▼3	4.8	9.6	10,503	–4.4
Independent	4	2	N/A	N/A	Steady	4.8	3.3	3,672	–2.0
Labour	38	1	N/A	N/A	▼3	2.4	22.0	24,174	–0.7
Green	16	0	N/A	N/A	Steady	0.0	6.0	6,648	+2.7
UKIP	8	0	N/A	N/A	Steady	0.0	3.9	4,309	N/A

== Ward results ==
Incumbent councillors standing for re-election are marked with an asterisk (*). Changes in seats do not take into account by-elections or defections.

=== Aldeburgh ===
Aldeburgh (2 seats)
Party	Candidate	Votes	%	±%
Conservative	T-J Haworth-Culf	1,450	58.3	
Conservative	Maureen Jones	1,230	49.5	
Independent	Marianne Fellowes	1,035	41.6	
Labour	Ian Ilett	518	20.8	
Liberal Democrats	Jennifer Bridson	389	15.6	
Liberal Democrats	Benjamin Gulliford	352	14.2	
Turnout		~2,487		
Conservative hold				
Conservative hold				

=== Deben ===
Deben
Party	Candidate	Votes	%
Liberal Democrats	Christine Block	567	34.8
Conservative	Terry Eastman	512	31.4
UKIP	Angela Lawrence	286	17.6
Labour	Alison Springford	135	8.3
Green	Gary Lowe	129	7.9
Majority		55	3.4
Turnout		1,629	
Liberal Democrats win (new seat)			

=== Felixstowe East ===
Felixstowe East (2 seats)
Party	Candidate	Votes	%	±%
Conservative	Steve Gallant	1,795	63.2	
Conservative	Doreen Savage	1,716	60.4	
Labour	Hattie Bennett	856	30.1	
UKIP	Keith Phair	687	24.2	
Labour	Richard Reaville	632	22.2	
Turnout		~2,843		
Conservative hold				
Conservative hold				

=== Felixstowe North ===
Felixstowe North (2 seats)
Party	Candidate	Votes	%	±%
Conservative	Stephen Bloomfield	1,583	58.4	
Labour	Mike Deacon	1,325	48.9	
Conservative	Mike Titchener	1,059	39.1	
Labour	Kimberley Williams	947	35.0	
Liberal Democrats	Michael Ninnmey	502	18.5	
Turnout		~2,708		
Conservative gain from Labour				
Labour hold				

=== Felixstowe South ===
Felixstowe South (2 seats)
Party	Candidate	Votes	%	±%
Conservative	Peter Coleman	1,623	59.9	
Conservative	Andy Smith	1,310	48.4	
Labour	Corrine Franklin	785	29.0	
Labour	David Rowe	712	26.3	
Green	Cherrie MacGregor	536	19.8	
Liberal Democrats	Gez Hughes	452	16.7	
Turnout		~2,709		
Conservative hold				
Conservative hold				

=== Felixstowe West ===
Felixstowe West (2 seats)
Party	Candidate	Votes	%	±%
Conservative	Stuart Bird	1,256	52.3	
Conservative	Tracey Green	1,144	47.6	
Labour	Michael Sharman	995	41.4	
Labour	Margaret Morris	953	39.7	
Liberal Democrats	Jon Woods	458	19.1	
Turnout		~2,403		
Conservative hold				
Conservative gain from Labour				

=== Framlingham ===
Framlingham (2 seats)
Party	Candidate	Votes	%	±%
Conservative	Christopher Hudson	1,560	55.2	
Conservative	Paul Rous	1,555	55.0	
Green	Jackie Barrow	575	20.3	
Green	Rachel Fulcher	467	16.5	
UKIP	David Bosworth	451	16.0	
Labour	Edna Salmon	377	13.3	
UKIP	David Owen	356	12.6	
Labour	Shasha Toptani	312	11.0	
Turnout		~2,826		
Conservative hold				
Conservative hold				

=== Fynn Valley ===
Fynn Valley
Party	Candidate	Votes	%
Conservative	Robert Whiting	1,379	72.8
Labour	Valerie Pizzey	270	14.3
Green	Barbara Richardson-Todd	244	12.9
Majority		1,109	58.5
Turnout		1,893	
Conservative win (new seat)			

=== Grundisburgh ===
Grundisburgh
Party	Candidate	Votes	%	±%
Conservative	Tony Fryatt	1,299	64.3	
Labour	Graham Hedger	381	18.9	
Liberal Democrats	Vic Harrup	339	16.8	
Majority		918	45.4	
Turnout		2,019		
Conservative hold		Swing		

=== Hacheston ===
Hacheston
Party	Candidate	Votes	%	±%
Conservative	Carol Poulter	1,125	57.1	
Green	Rhodri Griffiths	361	18.3	
Labour	Lesley Bensley	309	15.7	
Liberal Democrats	Janet Tait	174	8.8	
Majority		764	38.8	
Turnout		1,969		
Conservative hold		Swing		

=== Kesgrave East ===
Kesgrave East (2 seats)
Party	Candidate	Votes	%	±%
Conservative	Sue Mower	2,038	67.1	
Conservative	Geoff Lynch	1,874	61.7	
Labour	David Isaacs	858	28.2	
Labour	Julie Cuninghame	715	23.5	
Liberal Democrats	Jon Neal	593	19.5	
Turnout		~3,039		
Conservative hold				
Conservative hold				

=== Kesgrave West ===
Kesgrave West (2 seats)
Party	Candidate	Votes	%	±%
Conservative	Debbie McCallum	2,265	68.4	
Conservative	Stuart Lawson	1,838	55.5	
Labour	Kevin Archer	1,027	31.0	
UKIP	David Hayes	819	24.7	
Labour	Anne Hubert-Chibnall	677	20.4	
Turnout		~3,313		
Conservative hold				
Conservative hold				

=== Kirton ===
Kirton
Party	Candidate	Votes	%
Conservative	Susan Harvey	1,252	67.0
Green	Betsy Reid	340	18.2
Labour	Keith Barnett	278	14.9
Majority		912	48.8
Turnout		1,870	
Conservative win (new seat)			

=== Leiston ===
Leiston (2 seats)
Party	Candidate	Votes	%	±%
Independent	Tony Cooper	918	33.3	
Conservative	Ian Pratt	887	32.1	
Conservative	Richard Smith	845	30.6	
Labour	Terry Hodgson	691	25.0	
Labour	Phil Harle	619	22.4	
Independent	Mike Taylor	505	18.3	
Green	Ron Bailey	320	11.6	
Green	Marie Clark	309	11.2	
Liberal Democrats	Paul Jackman-Graham	264	9.6	
Liberal Democrats	Courtney Mower	162	5.9	
Turnout		~2,760		
Independent hold				
Conservative hold				

=== Martlesham ===
Martlesham (2 seats)
Party	Candidate	Votes	%	±%
Conservative	Chris Blundell	1,763	67.0	
Liberal Democrats	John Kelso	1,380	52.4	
Conservative	Stephen Attwell	1,190	45.2	
Labour	Liz Thompson	528	20.1	
Labour	Julie Lummis	405	15.4	
Turnout		~2,633		
Conservative hold				
Liberal Democrats hold				

=== Melton ===
Melton (2 seats)
Party	Candidate	Votes	%
Conservative	Jim Bidwell	1,759	59.9
Conservative	Jane Day	1,225	41.8
Liberal Democrats	Nigel Brown	766	26.1
UKIP	Garry Debenham	642	21.9
Labour	Jeremy Bale	624	21.3
Green	Rachel Smith-Lyte	453	15.4
Green	Richard Bull	400	13.6
Turnout		~2,934	
Conservative win (new seat)			
Conservative win (new seat)			

=== Nacton & Purdis Farm ===
Nacton & Purdis Farm
Party	Candidate	Votes	%
Conservative	Nicky Yeo	1,333	75.7
Labour	Peter Waller	427	24.3
Majority		906	51.4
Turnout		1,760	
Conservative win (new seat)			

=== Orford & Eyke ===
Orford & Eyke
Party	Candidate	Votes	%
Conservative	Ray Herring	1,010	57.9
Liberal Democrats	Andrew McDonald	273	15.7
Labour	John White	244	14.0
Green	Stephen Smedley	218	12.5
Majority		737	42.2
Turnout		1,745	
Conservative win (new seat)			

=== Peasenhall & Yoxford ===
Peasenhall & Yoxford
Party	Candidate	Votes	%
Conservative	Stephen Burroughes	1,066	58.2
Green	Tom Haslam	378	20.6
Labour	Susan Rowberry	250	13.7
Liberal Democrats	Julia McLean	137	7.5
Majority		688	37.6
Turnout		1,831	
Conservative win (new seat)			

=== Rendlesham ===
Rendlesham
Party	Candidate	Votes	%	±%
Conservative	Michael Bond	1,030	68.3	
Labour	Sue Bale	478	31.7	
Majority		552	36.6	
Turnout		1,508		
Conservative hold		Swing		

=== Saxmundham ===
Saxmundham (2 seats)
Party	Candidate	Votes	%	±%
Independent	John Fisher	1,214	51.6	
Conservative	Phillip Dunnett	1,186	50.4	
Conservative	Julia Ewart	1,043	44.4	
Liberal Democrats	James Sandbach	677	28.8	
Liberal Democrats	Keith Dickerson	581	24.7	
Turnout		~2,351		
Independent hold				
Conservative hold				

=== Tower ===
Tower (2 seats)
Party	Candidate	Votes	%
Conservative	Mark Newton	1,997	71.9
Conservative	Deborah Dean	1,866	67.2
Labour	Amy Trenter	868	31.2
Labour	Stan Robinson	826	29.7
Turnout		~2,779	
Conservative win (new seat)			
Conservative win (new seat)			

=== The Trimleys ===
The Trimleys (2 seats)
Party	Candidate	Votes	%
Conservative	Graham Harding	1,564	66.0
Conservative	Richard Kerry	1,420	59.9
Labour	Johnny Goodhand	730	30.8
Labour	Neville Mayes	711	30.0
Liberal Democrats	Edward Thompson	313	13.2
Turnout		~2,369	
Conservative win (new seat)			
Conservative win (new seat)			

=== Wenhaston & Westleton ===
Wenhaston & Westleton
Party	Candidate	Votes	%
Conservative	Raymond Catchpole	907	53.3
Liberal Democrats	Andrew Turner	402	23.6
Labour	Robert MacGibbon	393	23.1
Majority		505	29.7
Turnout		1,702	
Conservative win (new seat)			

=== Wickham Market ===
Wickham Market
Party	Candidate	Votes	%	±%
Conservative	Mark Amoss	746	44.6	
UKIP	Michael Coney	313	18.7	
Liberal Democrats	Jon James	313	18.7	
Labour	John Ridd	302	18.0	
Majority		433	25.9	
Turnout		1,674		
Conservative hold		Swing		

=== Woodbridge ===
Woodbridge (3 seats)
Party	Candidate	Votes	%
Conservative	Geoff Holdcroft	2,499	53.3
Conservative	Patti Mulcahy	2,297	49.0
Conservative	Colin Hedgley	2,165	46.2
Liberal Democrats	Kay Yule	1,409	30.1
Labour	Roy Burgon	1,097	23.4
Labour	Phyllis Palmer	1,049	22.4
Labour	Craig Robinson	870	18.6
UKIP	Ray Tunstall	755	16.1
Green	Aidan Semmens	686	14.6
Green	Martin Wilks	643	13.7
Green	Regan Scott	589	12.6
Turnout		~4,688	
Conservative hold			
Conservative hold			
Conservative hold			

== By-elections ==
Leiston By-Election 17 May 2018
Party	Candidate	Votes	%	±%
Conservative	Susan Geater	612	42.1	+13.3
Labour	Freda Casagrande	336	23.1	+0.7
Independent	Sammy Betson	293	20.2	+20.2
Liberal Democrats	Jules Ewart	213	14.6	+6.0
Majority		276	19.0	
Turnout		1,454		
Conservative hold		Swing		

Wenhaston and Westleton By-Election 20 September 2018
Party	Candidate	Votes	%	±%
Conservative	Michael Gower	431	50.6	−2.7
Liberal Democrats	Andrew Turner	340	40.0	+16.4
Green	Carl Bennett	80	9.4	+9.4
Majority		91	10.7	
Turnout		851		
Conservative hold		Swing		
