= Sutton Heath =

Coordinates: 52.080796°N 1.387295°E

- Location within Suffolk
- OS grid reference: TM321479
- District: East Suffolk
- Shire county: Suffolk
- Region: East
- Country: England
- Sovereign state: United Kingdom
- Post town: Woodbridge
- Postcode district: IP12
- Dialling code: 01394
- Police: Suffolk
- Fire: Suffolk
- Ambulance: East of England
- UK Parliament: Suffolk Coastal

Sutton Heath is a civil parish on the former site of RAF Woodbridge, in the East Suffolk district, in the county of Suffolk, England. The parish was formed on 1 April 2012 from part of the parish of Sutton. The new parish was created following petitioning by residents to Suffolk Coastal District Council who believed it was more urban than its surrounding area in Sutton and therefore had different needs.

Sutton Heath has a shop and primary school. The parish incorporates the military installation of MoD Woodbridge.
