= Channel River =

Prehistoric river in Europe

The Channel River was a prehistoric river flowing between modern-day England and France during periods of low sea level during the ice ages. Its tributaries included the river Rhine in modern-day Netherlands, Germany, France, and Switzerland, the River Thames in modern-day England, the Scheldt in modern day Netherlands, Belgium, and France, and other rivers. Over the last 12,000 years rising seas have covered its course, through what is now the English Channel.

== Formation ==
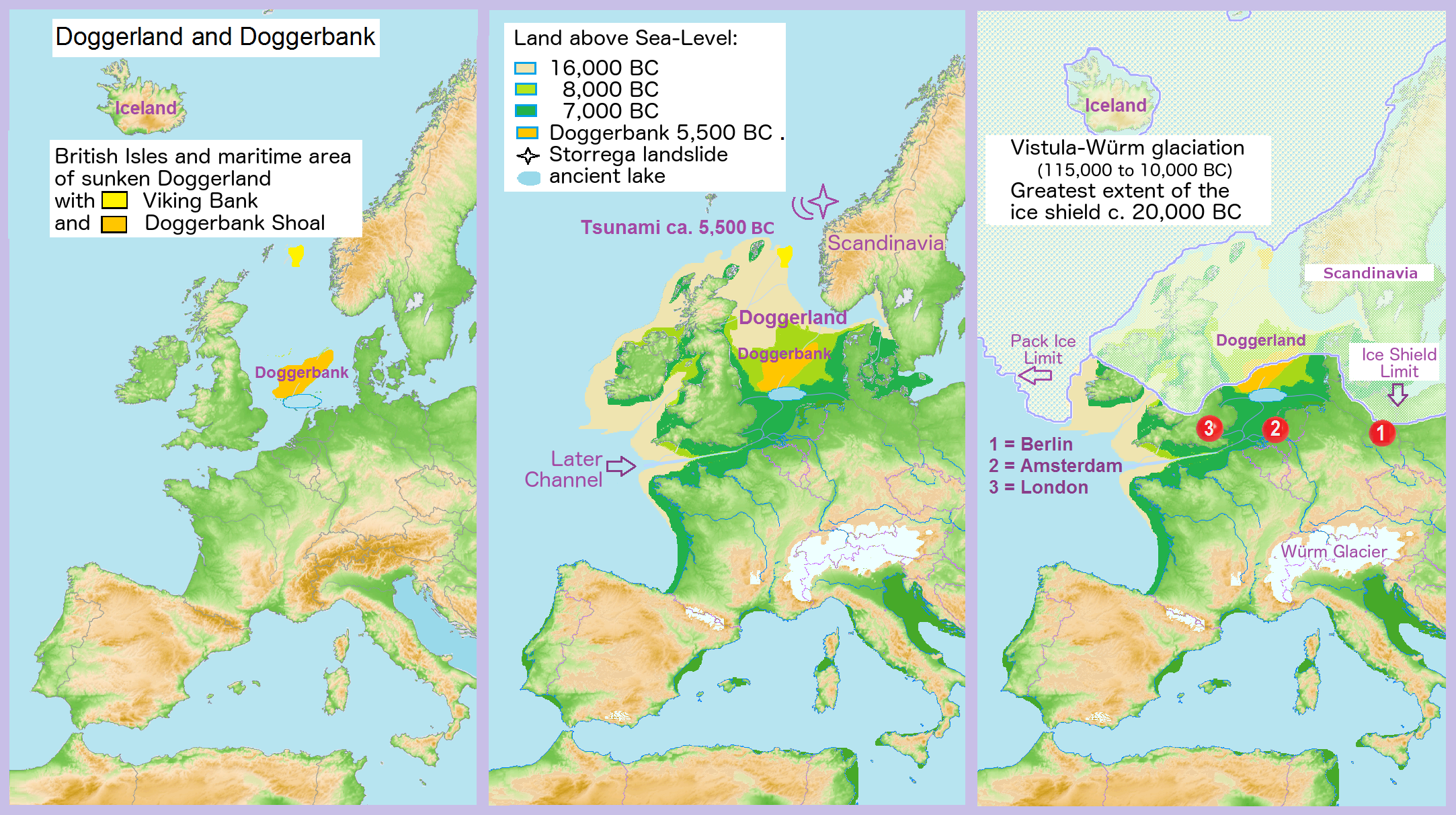
Map showing hypothetical extent of Doggerland from Weichselian glaciation until the current situation

Paleogeographers studying the Quaternary period have suggested that 600,000 years ago, although the Channel and the North Sea were flooded, the Weald-Artois ridge remained as a land bridge between Britain and Continental Europe, allowing people, plants and animals to cross. This barrier also separated the drainage basins of the rivers, with the Rhine and the Thames forced to flow into the North Sea.

A bathymetric study of the morphology of the current Channel floor in 2007 found evidence suggesting that the ridge was eroded by two 'megafloods' between 180,000 and 450,000 years ago. During periods of glaciation the British and the Fennoscandian ice sheets trapped water, preventing it from flowing north, and together with the land bridge to the south formed a glacial lake. The lake grew as the rivers continued to pour into it until it finally breached the southern ridge, creating what the paper called the 'Fleuve Manche', translating to Channel River, flowing through the vast shallow valley of the Channel Basin and into the Bay of Biscay.

This westward-flowing Channel River carried water not only from the rivers that currently enter the Channel (such as the Seine), but also from those that now drain into the southern North Sea, among them the Rhine, Meuse, Thames and Scheldt, making it larger than any river in modern-day Europe.

The erosion from two such breaches left a significant gap in the ridge, so when the ice melted and the seas rose, water covered the area, cutting Britain off. Since the last ice age, around 12,000 years ago, the current Channel formed, and the Strait of Dover is now a 32 km (20 mi) wide gap in the ridge, bordered by cliffs of between 15 and 45 m (49 and 148 ft) high on both the Kent and the Calais sides.

== Studies ==
Unfortunately erosion along the coastline made it difficult to analyse sedimentary deposits, and to get a clear picture of what happened so long ago. This is why a team of Anglo-French scientists studied sedimentary deposits in the Bay of Biscay, where they will have remained undisturbed at the bottom of the sea for thousands of years. Their findings were published in 2009, and added more detail to the process of separation, and concluded that Britain and France were separated by a "super-river" during three periods of glaciation.

== See also ==
- Geology of the southern North Sea
