= Richmond Farm Pit, Gedgrave =

Geological Site of Special Scientific Interest

Coordinates: 52.089°N 1.519°E

- Site of Special Scientific Interest
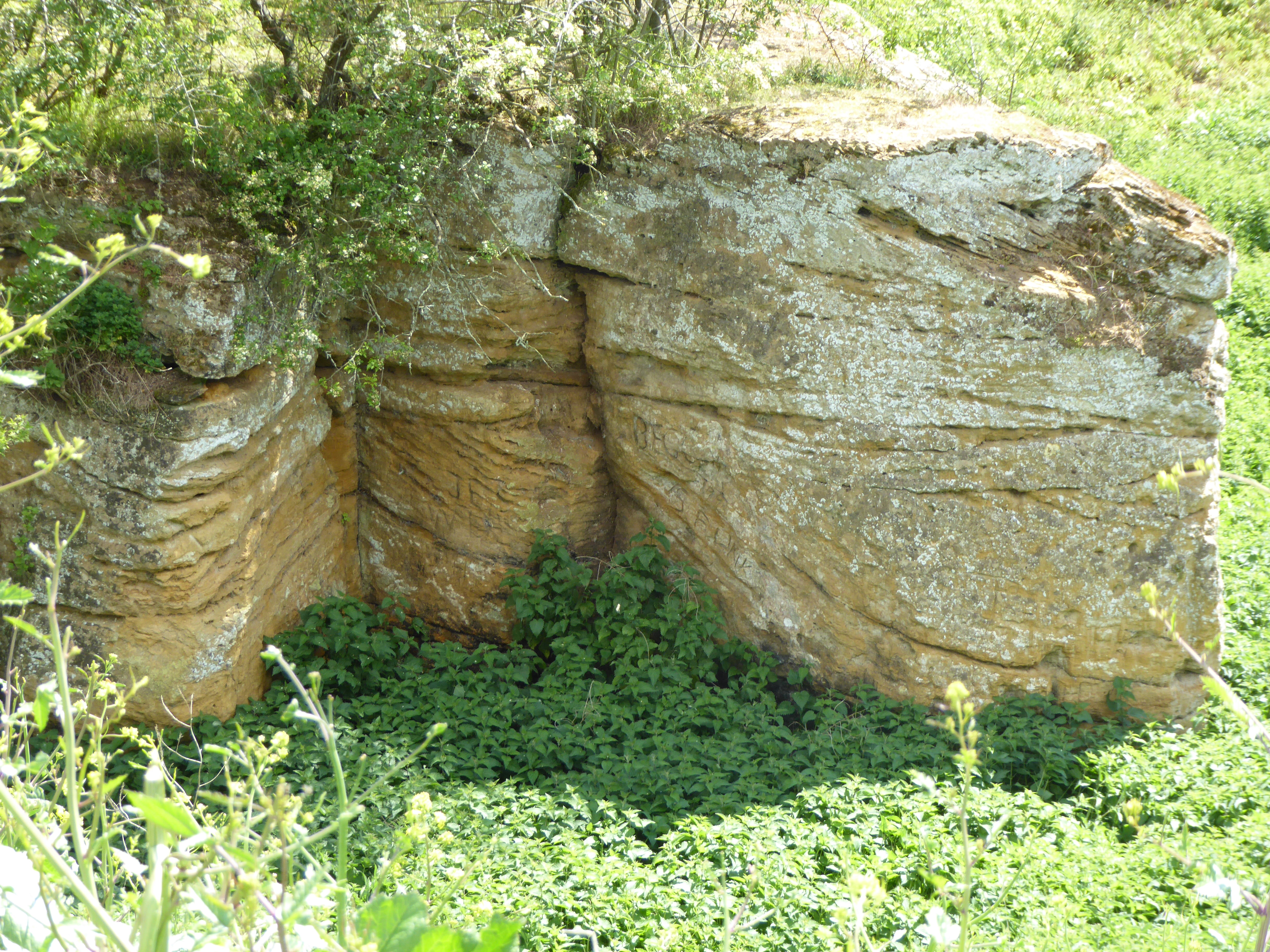
- Location of Richmond Farm Pit, Gedgrave.
- Area of search: Suffolk
- Grid reference: TM 412 492
- Interest: Geological
- Area: 0.57 hectares
- Notification date: 1985
- Location map: Magic Map

Richmond Farm Pit, Gedgrave is a 0.57-hectare (1.4-acre) geological Site of Special Scientific Interest south-west of Orford in Suffolk. It is a Geological Conservation Review site, and is in the Suffolk Coast and Heaths Area of Outstanding Natural Beauty.

This pit shows the Coralline Crag Formation of the Pliocene. It is described by Natural England as especially notable for its excellent exposure of the sandwave facies of the Coralline Crag, but it has very few fossils, which have been transported elsewhere.

It is situated some 500 metres from the similar site Gedgrave Hall Pit. The site is on private land with no public access.
