= Ancestral Thames =

Geologically ancient precursor to the present day River Thames

The Ancestral Thames is the geologically ancient precursor to the present day River Thames. The river has its origins in the emergence of Britain from a Cretaceous sea over 60 million years ago. Parts of the river's course were profoundly modified by the Anglian (or Elsterian) glaciation some 450,000 years ago. The extensive terrace deposits laid down by the Ancestral Thames over the past two million years or so have provided a rich source of material for studies in geology, geomorphology, palaeontology and archaeology.

== Cretaceous to Miocene periods ==
During the latter part of the Cretaceous period, around 80 million years ago, sea level is thought to have been over 150 metres higher than today. Much of the land which was later to form Britain was covered by sea. In this marine environment, thick deposits of Chalk were laid down.

From the early Paleocene (from around 65 million years ago), much of what is now Britain emerged above sea level. The maximum uplift occurred in the north-west, with a regional tilt towards the east and south-east. The North Sea basin and the western English Channel basin also developed.

The drainage of much of England was thus aligned to the south-east. As the land emerged from beneath the Cretaceous sea, precursors of some of today's major drainage systems of central, eastern and southern England developed. Thus, from the early Tertiary period a number of major consequent rivers flowed approximately NW-SE down the tilted emergent Chalk surface towards what later became southern England. One of those watercourses was a precursor of the River Thames.

South-eastern England was low-lying and, from the late Palaeocene onwards (from about 55 million years ago), it was inundated periodically by marine transgressions from the east. Substantial deposits of marine, lacustrine and deltaic origin were laid down across the region. In particular, over 150 metres of London Clay were laid down.

And, as the Palaeocene period progressed, subsidence in this region led to the formation of the London Basin, with its approximately west-east axis. The Ancestral Thames thus flowed from the north-west, into this basin.

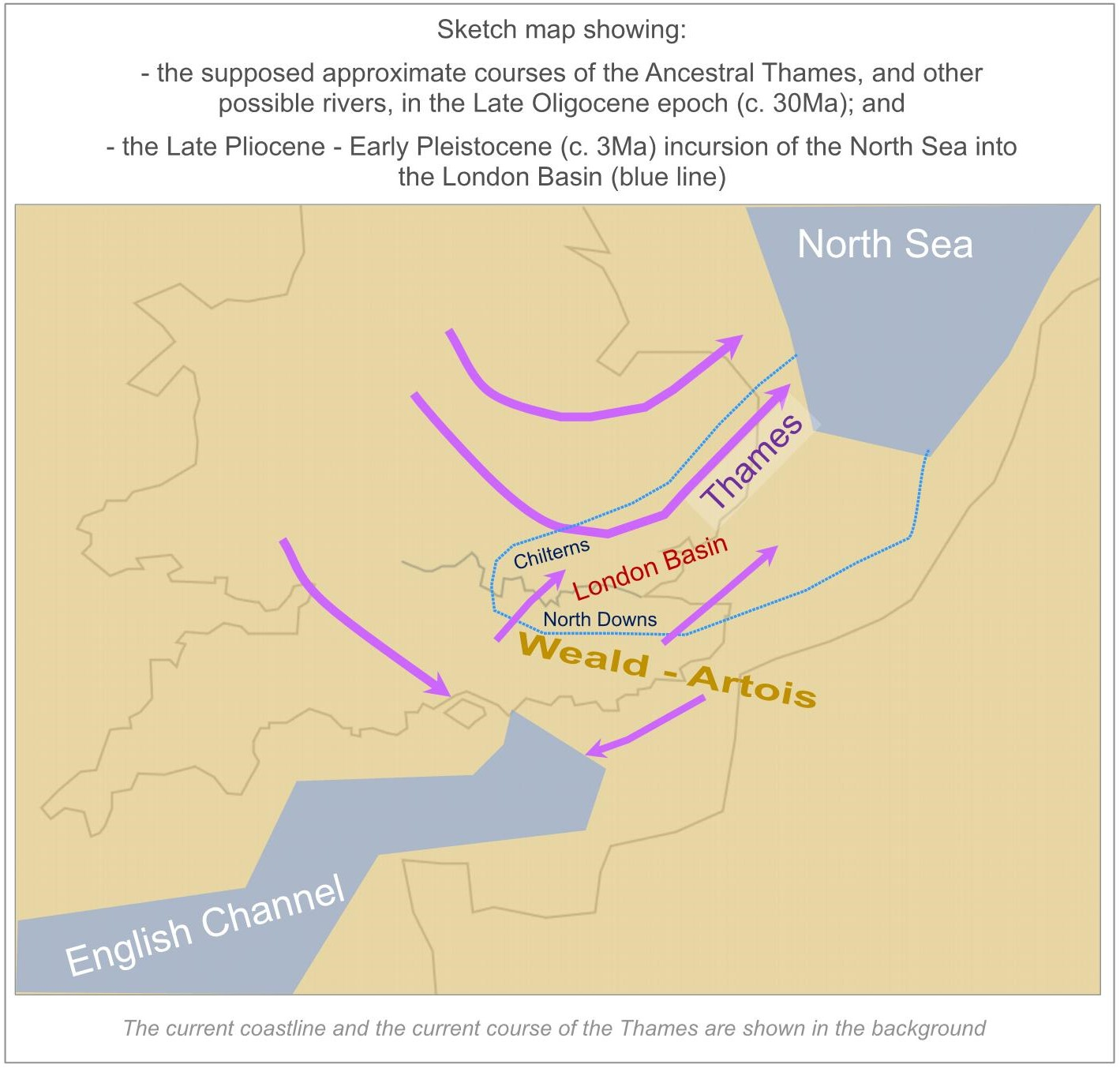
Sources: see text and references, notably "Gibbard & Lewin 2003"; and Gibbard, P., North West European Rivers (2. Late Pliocene - Early Pleistocene).

By the Oligocene period, around 30 million years ago, the coastline had retreated to the east of the London Basin. It is believed that, at that time, the Ancestral Thames was still flowing from the north-west, into the London Basin. From there, the river flowed broadly eastwards towards the North Sea basin of that period.

And, also by the Oligocene period, the Wealden (or Weald-Artois) Anticline, to the south of the London Basin, was uplifted as a result of the Alpine orogeny. Rivers which were draining from the northern flank of that anticline - precursors of watercourses like today's Mole, Wey and Darent rivers - would have begun feeding into the Thames from the south. Further east, a proto-Medway river also flowed northwards from the Weald. But that watercourse flowed parallel to the proto-Thames towards the North Sea basin, and it did not form a confluence with the Thames until later on, in the Pleistocene period.

There were periodic marine transgressions towards the London Basin during the Miocene period (around 10-20 million years ago), but it is thought that these did not significantly alter pre-existing drainage systems.

== Pliocene period to early Middle Pleistocene period ==
At times during the Pliocene period (around 5-3 million years ago), the North Sea coastline extended westwards, depositing various early Crag formations in an area now occupied by parts of East Anglia. But, again, this appears not to have had any significant effect on the Thames drainage system.

However, in the Late Pliocene and early Pleistocene periods (c.3-2 million years ago), the London Basin became submerged. Fossiliferous sands were deposited. Subsequent Pleistocene uplift caused a relative displacement of c.180 metres between the western London Basin and the Suffolk coast, and remnants of those fossiliferous sands are now found at up to that altitude in the North Downs and Chiltern Hills. As the sea retreated eastwards, the River Thames system occupied the basin vacated by the sea.

There is evidence that, for a time during the Early and possibly Middle Pleistocene period (c.2-0.5 million years ago), the headwaters of the River Thames extended north-westwards as far as north Wales. Pebbles from formations of that area have been found in deposits laid down by the Thames in East Anglia. It has also been established that, during that time, the Thames, after entering the London Basin somewhere around the Goring Gap, then followed a course north-eastwards and northwards into North Norfolk, on a course towards the North Sea Basin. At times, "the southern North Sea was occupied by the huge delta complex of the North German Rivers, the Rhine, Thames, Meuse and Scheldt".

The Early and Middle Pleistocene gravel which was deposited by the Thames in East Anglia also contains chert from Lower Greensand beds to the south of London, and this "can only have been transported northwards by south-bank tributaries of the Thames and then the Thames itself". Thus, ancestral versions of today's Mole, Wey and Darent rivers were feeding into the Thames from the Weald at that time. (The Mole and Wey joined to form one river in south London, and that Mole-Wey watercourse flowed north-eastwards across London and south Hertfordshire before joining the Thames.)

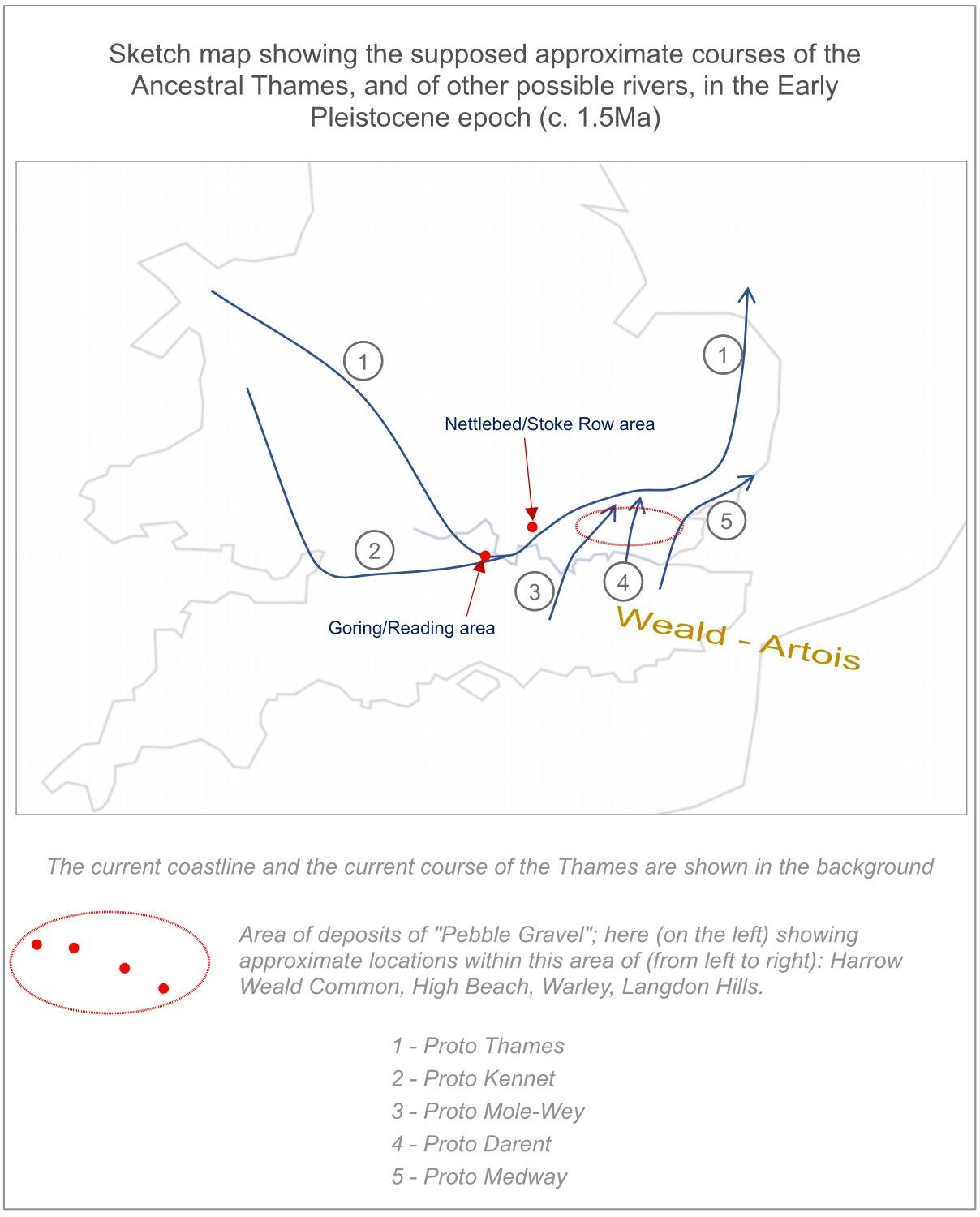
Sources: see text and references, notably "Bridgland 1994", Chapter 1; "Bridgland & Gibbard 1997"; and "Rose & others 1999".

The deposits laid down by the Thames in East Anglia are also said to contain material from "Carboniferous and Devonian sandstones from southern Wales". This suggests that the headwaters of the River Kennet (which today has its source in Wiltshire and meets the Thames at Reading), extended back into south Wales during the Early and Middle Pleistocene periods.

During the Early and Middle Pleistocene, prior to the Anglian glaciation, the Thames in the Chilterns and in East Anglia moved progressively south-eastwards. In the Chilterns, it moved south-eastwards to a line approximately along the Vale of St Albans. In East Anglia, it moved down to around Colchester. East of that, around Clacton, the Thames finally formed a confluence with the River Medway.

It seems likely that, at some time prior to the Anglian glaciation, the River Darent was captured by a left-bank tributary of the Medway. The Darent thus ceased to be a right-bank tributary of the Ancestral Thames, and instead turned east somewhere just north of Dartford, and flowed into the Medway. As noted below, it is thought that, when the Thames was diverted by the Anglian glaciation, it followed this lower section of the Darent into the Medway.

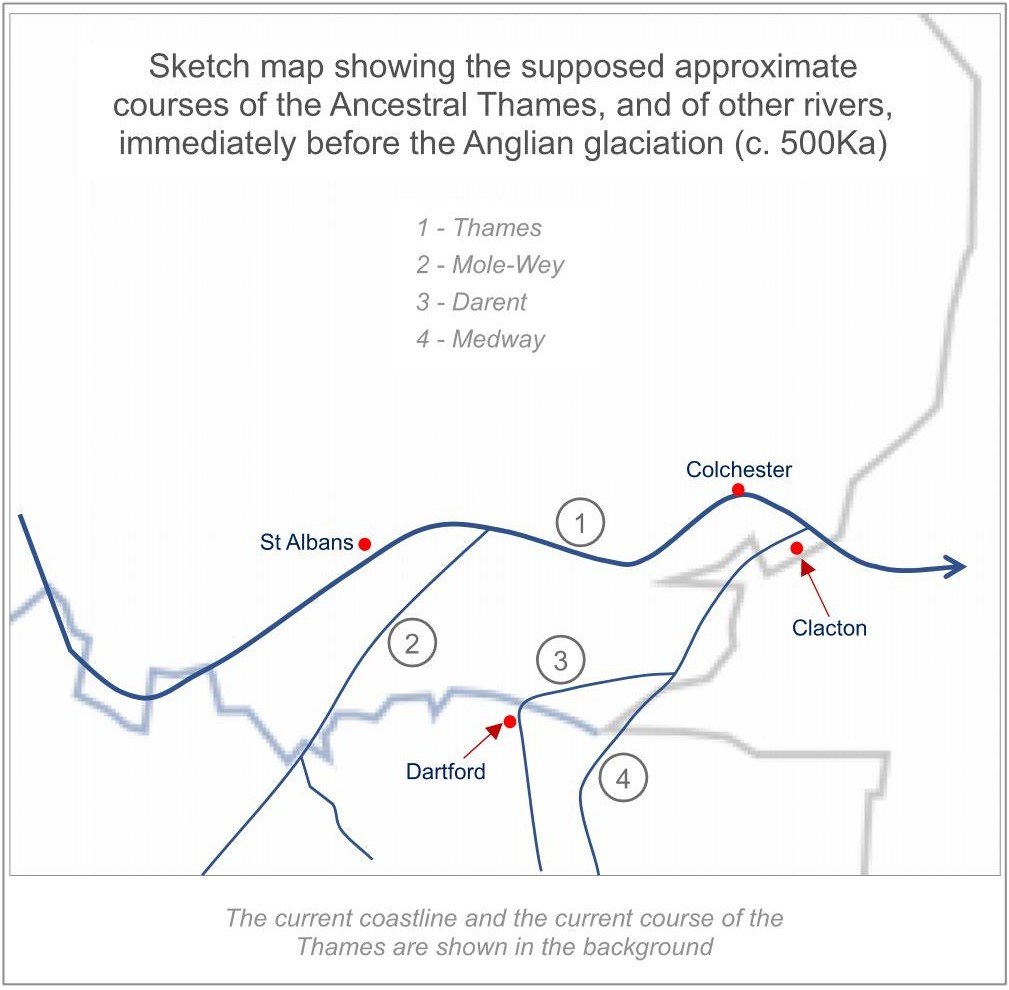
Sources: see text and references, notably "Bridgland 1994"; "Bridgland & Gibbard 1997"; and "Bridgland, 1999".

== Middle and Late Pleistocene periods ==
During the Anglian glaciation, some 450,000 years ago, ice sheets of a significantly greater amplitude than that of any ice sheets which had previously developed in the Pleistocene moved down from Scandinavia and the north of Britain. They coalesced and reached as far south as the southern part of the North Sea basin, East Anglia, London, the Cotswolds and South Wales.

One result of this was that the Thames lost those of its headwaters which had previously extended back into the Midlands and Wales.

The Anglian glaciation had the effect of causing a breach of the land bridge between Britain and north-west Europe, across the Weald-Artois anticline. This was because of the formation and overflow southwards of a large pro-glacial lake which was fed by the Thames, Rhine and other major north-west European rivers and which was blocked to the north by the coalesced ice sheets. The lake drained, with immense force, into the Channel River to the south-west, thus carving out what was later to become the Dover Strait.

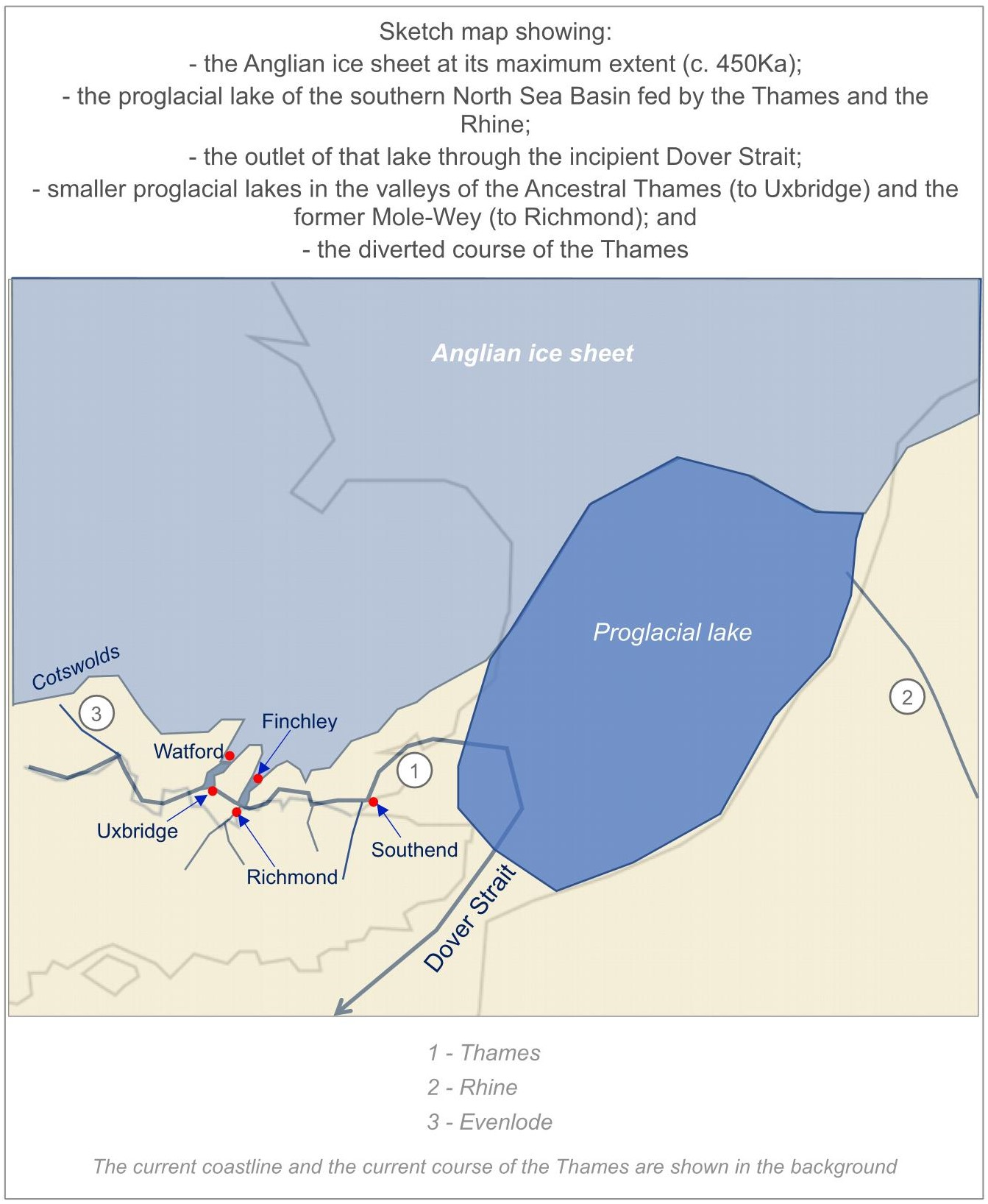
Sources: see text and references, notably Gibbard, P., North West European Rivers - 5. Elsterian/Anglian Stage; "García-Moreno and others 2019"; and Gibbard, P., 2019, The Quaternary Evolution of the North Sea.

The Anglian ice sheet in East Anglia, and its powerful outwash, completely overrode and engulfed the course of the Thames east of around Watford. The flow of the Thames was blocked and a proglacial lake was formed. The Thames was diverted away from its course along the Vale of St Albans, and it moved southwards to a line running from Uxbridge to Richmond, then north-east to Walthamstow, then eastwards, following in part the line of the pre-Anglian lower section of the River Darent, to about the current position of the Thames estuary. There, it joined the Medway coming from Kent. From there, the Thames flowed roughly northwards, along the course of the Medway, to re-join its former course at Clacton. Then the river flowed into the North Sea basin of that time.

The Mole-Wey river was also blocked by the advancing Anglian ice sheet, and a proglacial lake was formed in that river's valley, south of Finchley. The river subsequently joined the Thames at Richmond.

The Thames's north bank tributary, the Lea, extended its course southwards from Hertfordshire to join the diverted Thames somewhere south of Tottenham.

In addition, the Colne river was formed as a new north bank tributary of the Thames, flowing south from Hertfordshire, along part of the former valley of the Thames, to join the Thames at Uxbridge.

Between the end of the Anglian glaciation and the principal Wolstonian (or Saalian) glaciation about 150,000 years ago, sea level fell and rose as secondary glaciations came and went. But, during periods of low sea level in this time, it seems that the Thames turned to the south-west after leaving where Essex is today, then went through the proto-Dover Strait, and reached the sea in the English Channel. The Rhine, however, continued to flow northwards towards the North Sea basin. Even at times of relatively high sea level, there was usually a land barrier between the estuaries of the Thames and the Rhine.

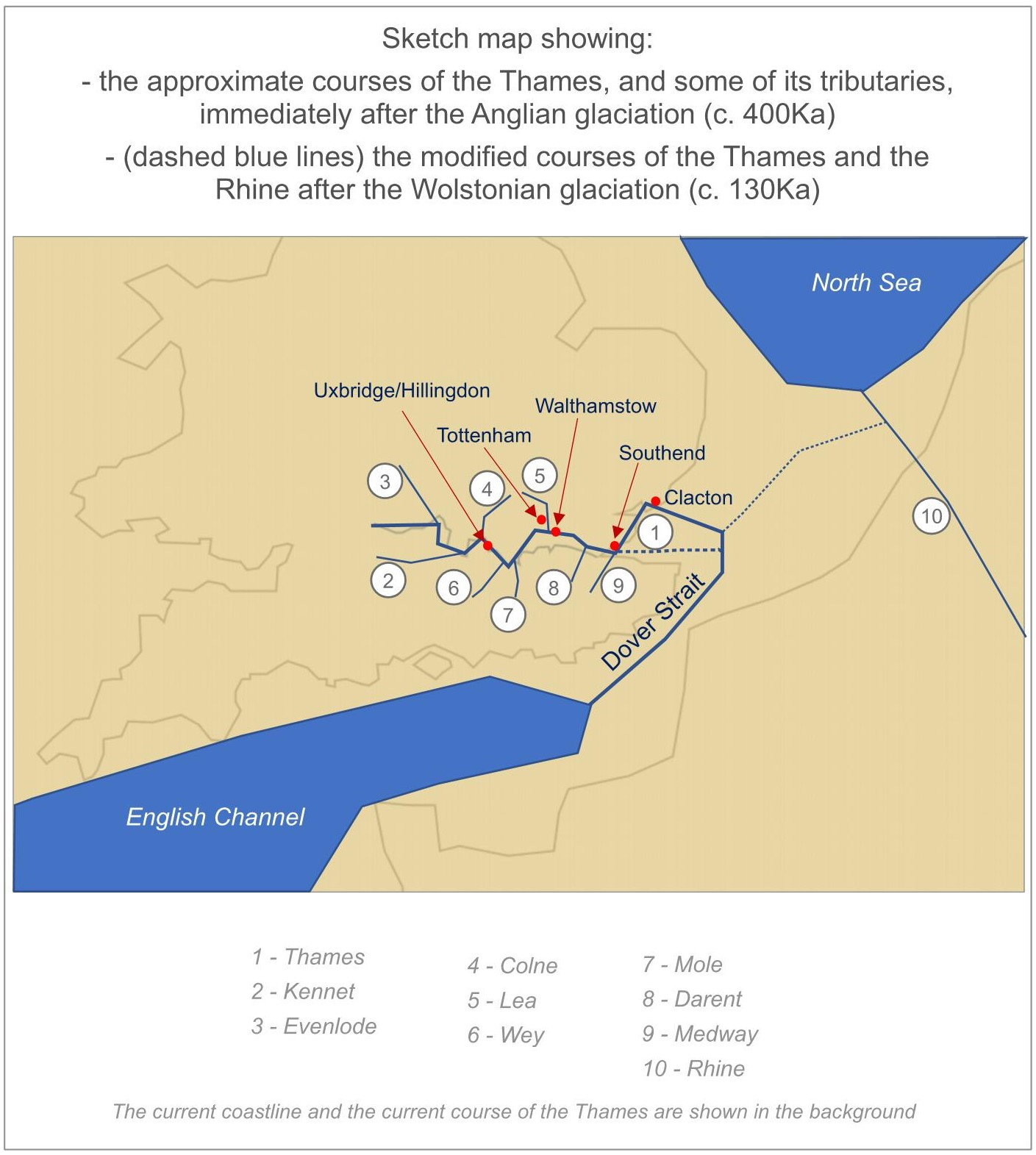
Sources: see text and references, notably "Bridgland 1994"; "Hijma and others 2012"; and "Gibbard and Cohen 2015".

Between the Anglian glaciation and the principal Wolstonian glaciation, the Thames in eastern Essex migrated southwards, from around Clacton to around Southend-on-Sea.

During the principal Wolstonian glaciation, ice sheets from the north coalesced once again. As during the earlier Anglian glaciation, a pro-glacial lake built up, fed by the Rhine in particular. That lake too overflowed south-westwards, reinforcing the proto-Dover Strait. This process may have played a significant role in the formation of the relatively deep and box-shaped Lobourg Channel in the bed of what is now the Dover Strait.

Once the Wolstonian lake was drained, the Rhine then flowed south-westwards, to turn towards the English Channel and join the Thames. The combined rivers presumably flowed through the Lobourg Channel.

Sea level rose again in the Ipswichian/Eemian interglacial period, around 120,000 years ago. The land bridge between Britain and the continent was cut off again. The River Thames then joined the sea a little inland compared to now.

Sea level fell again during the Devensian/Weichselian glaciation (115,000-12,000 years ago). This temporarily linked Britain and north-west Europe once more. However, the Thames and Rhine continued to flow south-westwards into the English Channel, not northwards towards the North Sea basin.

Sea level rose again towards the end of the Devensian glaciation. This led to the creation of the current coastline from around 8,000 years ago, with the Thames reaching the sea at its Essex-Kent estuary.

Inland of that estuary, and throughout post-Anglian times, the Thames shifted its course in various ways. (However, there were no further substantial changes to either the course of the river inland or to its catchment area.) For example, in west London, the Thames moved south from Hillingdon to Weybridge. And in east London the river moved southwards also, from Walthamstow to Greenwich.

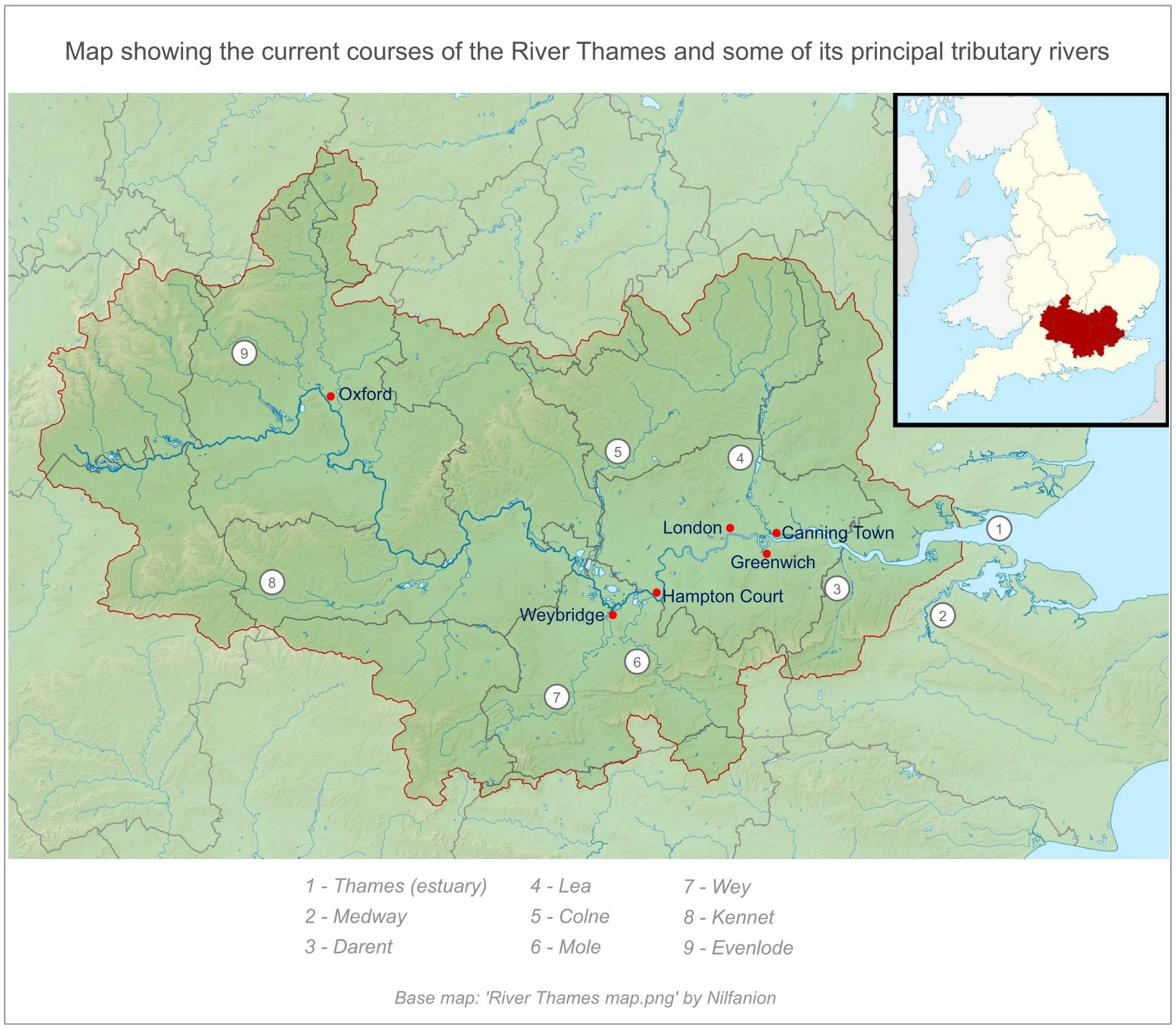

== Deposits of the Ancestral Thames and its tributaries ==
The onset of colder climatic conditions at the beginning of the Pleistocene period led to frequent downcutting by rivers in the Thames catchment area (and in north-west Europe in general). Periglacial processes also supplied abundant material for periodic aggradation, which mostly took place in braided river environments.

Thus, throughout the Pleistocene period, the Thames carved out a number of terraces as it flowed south through Oxfordshire, crossed the London Basin and then headed across East Anglia to the North Sea basin. The river also laid down on those terraces extensive deposits of (principally) silt, sand and gravel. Across Essex and Suffolk some of those deposits have been referred to as the Kesgrave Sands and Gravels. Overall, the Thames valley "includes the largest single spread of terrace deposits in the country".

The Thames terrace deposits are remarkably diverse in composition and origin. For example:
- Rocks of volcanic origin from Wales have been found in some of the older deposits.
- "Pudding stone" and sarsen stones from lower Eocene beds in the London Basin have also been found in places.
- Extensive spreads of wind-blown deposits, laid down in extremely cold, dry conditions during the most recent (Devensian) glaciation, are found in lower stretches of the Thames and Lea valleys. Such deposits are often shown as "brickearth" on geological maps.

Some of those Thames deposits - especially sands, gravels and brickearth - have proved to be of considerable commercial value and have been extensively worked in quarries and pits.

Some of them have also been dated, and, through often minute scientific investigation of the deposits, it has been possible to trace in detail the Pleistocene history of the Thames as it changed course and continually cut down into underlying geological formations. The oldest identified Thames deposits in the London Basin are those at Nettlebed (possibly) and Stoke Row in the Oxfordshire Chilterns, at altitudes today of 200 and 175 metres respectively. The Stoke Row deposits are thought to have been laid down nearly two million years ago.

Tributaries of the Thames, such as the Evenlode, Kennet, Lea, Mole, Wey and Darent, have also left behind spreads of fluvial deposits.

In particular, those tributaries which flowed northwards from the Weald left behind deposits which, in some cases, now lie north of today's River Thames. This is because, as noted above, the confluences of those tributaries with the Thames moved south when the Thames was diverted by the Anglian ice sheet.

The oldest of such tributary deposits appear to include spreads of "Pebble Gravel", now found on plateaus and hilltops in north London, Hertfordshire and Essex. It has been suggested that the Stanmore Pebble Gravel at Harrow Weald Common, for example, was laid down at about the same time as the Thames terrace at Stoke Row (see above) - that is, nearly two million years ago. This Stanmore Gravel is seen as representing a south-bank tributary (perhaps a precursor of the Mole-Wey drainage system) of the Early Pleistocene Thames. And the gravel which caps the Langdon Hills, near Basildon, is thought to have been laid down by a precursor of the River Darent. However, in the case of similar hilltop gravel deposits - such as those at High Beach in Epping Forest, and at Warley, near Brentwood - it is difficult to say at present which former south-bank tributaries of the proto-Thames were responsible for their deposition.

Further east, the former River Medway left pre-Anglian river terrace deposits (the "High-Level East Essex Gravel") across a strip of land which runs approximately northwards from Southend-on-Sea.

Quartz-rich gravels were deposited by the ancestral River Thames in southern Buckinghamshire and adjacent areas of Hertfordshire and Essex.
