= Waldringfield =

Village in Suffolk, England

Coordinates: 52.051648°N 1.322468°E

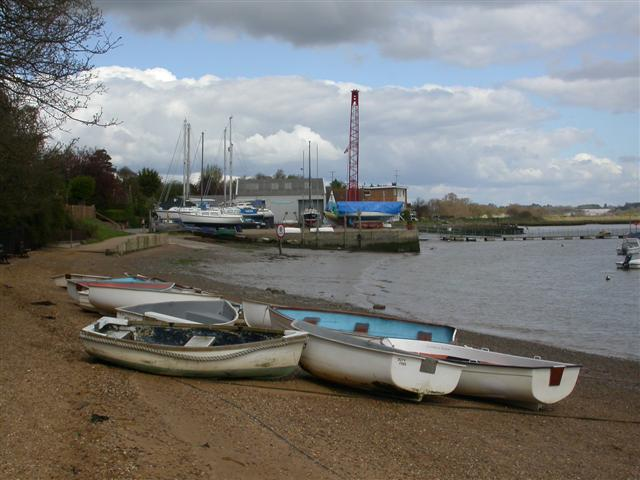
- Waldringfield Boat Yard on the River Deben

- Location within Suffolk
- Population: 464 (2011)
- OS grid reference: TM282446
- District: East Suffolk
- Shire county: Suffolk
- Region: East
- Country: England
- Sovereign state: United Kingdom
- Post town: Woodbridge
- Postcode district: IP12
- Police: Suffolk
- Fire: Suffolk
- Ambulance: East of England
- UK Parliament: Suffolk Coastal
- Website: Waldringfield Parish Council

Waldringfield is a village and civil parish in the East Suffolk local administration district, in the county of Suffolk, England. It is situated on the bank of the River Deben within the Suffolk Coast and Heaths designated Area of Outstanding Natural Beauty, 4 miles (6.4 km) south of the town of Woodbridge and 8 miles (12.9 km) east of the county town of Ipswich.

All Saints' Church dates from the 14th century. Restored in the 19th century, it is a grade II* listed building.

Waldringfield Heath, between the village and Martlesham on the edge of Ipswich, is the site of Waldringfield Golf Club. It also has a yacht club called Waldringfield Sailing Club.

A molar tooth from a macaque, probably of the Early Pliocene era was found at the Red Crag Formation in Waldringfield, representing one of the oldest and northernmost records of the genus in Europe reported to date.

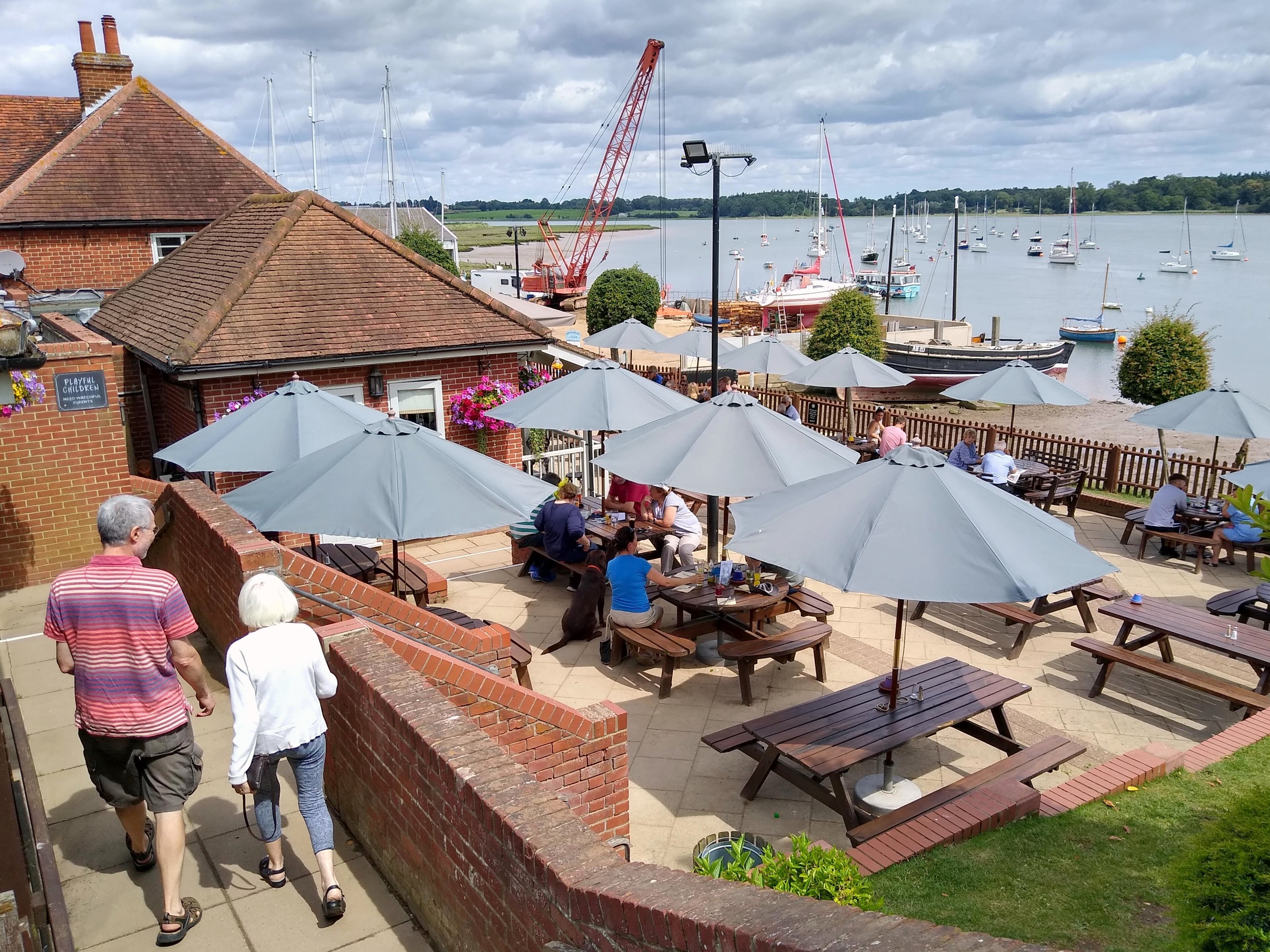
The Maybush Inn and the Deben in 2019

== History ==
The name Waldringfield is derived from the Old English words meaning 'open land of the family or followers of a man called Waldhere'. The length of human habitation at Waldringfield is unknown but Iron Age finds such as pottery shards from the 1st century BC have been found locally. Record of the settlement is found in the Domesday Book of 1086 under the name 'Waldingafelda' along with the name 'Minima Waldringafelda' (Lesser Waldringfield).

The village had an industrial heyday from about 1860 to 1907. First, until about 1895, coprolite was dug up locally, washed and sifted on the beach and shipped by barge to be processed in factories in Ipswich, as part of the early fertiliser industry. Then, at the end of the nineteenth century, a cement-making industry used mud from the river mixed with chalk brought in by barge from the Medway. Served by one hundred barges a month and employing twelve 'bottleneck' kilns, the industry survived until 1907. The kilns were demolished in 1912.
